= Ram Air Freight =

Cargo airline

IATA	ICAO	Call sign
-	REX	RAMEX
- Founded: 1982; 44 years ago
- Ceased operations: March 2, 2012; 14 years ago
- Operating bases: Raleigh-Durham International Airport; Concord Regional Airport
- Fleet size: 30
- Destinations: 37
- Headquarters: Morrisville, North Carolina United States
- Key people: -
- Website: http://www.ramairfreight.com/

Ram Air Freight was a cargo airline based in Morrisville, North Carolina, United States. It specialized in airfreight transportation, primarily the local and regional shipment of processed (printed) checks for banks. The company owned and operated a fleet of light, piston-engine aircraft and competed with other regional and national transportation and logistics firms. As banking systems transitioned to electronic check processing via the Check Clearing for the 21st Century Act, the market for this form of freight gradually disappeared. That digitization shift - combined with the retirement of the company's original partners, led to wind-down of Ram Air Freight's operations.

The airline had its main base at the Raleigh-Durham International Airport. It ceased operations on March 2, 2012. Following the closure, certain operational assets, including its FAA Part 135 air carrier and 145 repair station certificates, equipment, and personnel were transferred to another NC-based charter operator.

== History ==
Ram Air Freight was established in 1982 with a fleet of Grumman Cheetah. It ceased operations on March 2, 2012.

== Destinations ==
The airline had flights to 37 destinations across the Mid-Atlantic and South United States. Alabama

- Birmingham (Birmingham-Shuttlesworth International Airport)
- Mobile (Mobile Downtown Airport)

Florida

- Fort Lauderdale (Fort Lauderdale Executive Airport)
- Fort Myers (Fort Myers-Page Field Airport)
- Jacksonville (Jacksonville-Craig Airport)
- Orlando (Orlando-Executive Airport)
- Sarasota (Sarasota International Airport)
- Jacksonville (Tampa International Airport)

Georgia

- Atlanta (DeKalb-Peachtree Airport)
- Atlanta (Fulton County Airport)
- Gainesville (Lee Gilmer Memorial Airport)
- Macon (Middle Georgia Regional Airport)
- Savannah (Savannah/Hilton Head International Airport)

Kentucky

- Lexington (Blue Grass Airport)
- Louisville (Bowman Field)

Maryland

- Baltimore (Martin State Airport)

North Carolina

- Asheville (Asheville Regional Airport)
- Charlotte (Charlotte/Douglas International Airport)
- Concord (Concord Regional Airport)
- Elizabeth City (Elizabeth City Regional Airport)
- Fayetteville (Fayetteville Regional Airport)
- Greenville (Pitt-Greenville Airport)
- Hatteras (Billy Mitchell Airport)
- Jacksonville (Albert J. Ellis Airport)
- Kinston (Kinston Regional Jetport)
- Lumberton (Lumberton Municipal Airport)
- Manteo (Dare County Regional Airport)
- New Bern (Coastal Carolina Regional Airport)
- Raleigh (Raleigh-Durham International Airport) Main Base
- Rocky Mount (Rocky Mount-Wilson Regional Airport)
- Southern Pines (Moore County Airport)
- Wilmington (Wilmington International Airport)

South Carolina

- Beaufort (Beaufort County Airport)
- Columbia (Columbia Metropolitan Airport)
- Hilton Head (Hilton Head Airport)
- Myrtle Beach (Myrtle Beach International Airport)

Virginia

- Abingdon (Virginia Highlands Airport)
- Newport News (Newport News/Williamsburg International Airport)
- Norfolk (Norfolk International Airport)
- Richmond (Hanover County Municipal Airport)
- Richmond (Richmond International Airport)
- Roanoke (Roanoke Regional Airport)

West Virginia

- Charleston (Yeager Airport)

== Fleet ==
Ram Air Freight operated about 30 aircraft of four types:

- Piper PA-34 Seneca
- Piper PA-32R
- Cessna 402
- Beechcraft Baron

== See also ==
- List of defunct airlines of the United States
