= Oxford Airport (disambiguation) =

Oxford Airport is a privately owned airport in Oxford, England.

Oxford Airport may also refer to:

- Waterbury–Oxford Airport, an airport in Oxford, Connecticut
- University-Oxford Airport, an airport in Oxford, Mississippi
- Oxford House Airport, an airport in Oxford House, Manitoba
- Oxford Airport (Massachusetts), a defunct airport in Oxford, Massachusetts
- Henderson–Oxford Airport, an airport in Oxford, North Carolina
