= Ocracoke Island Airport =

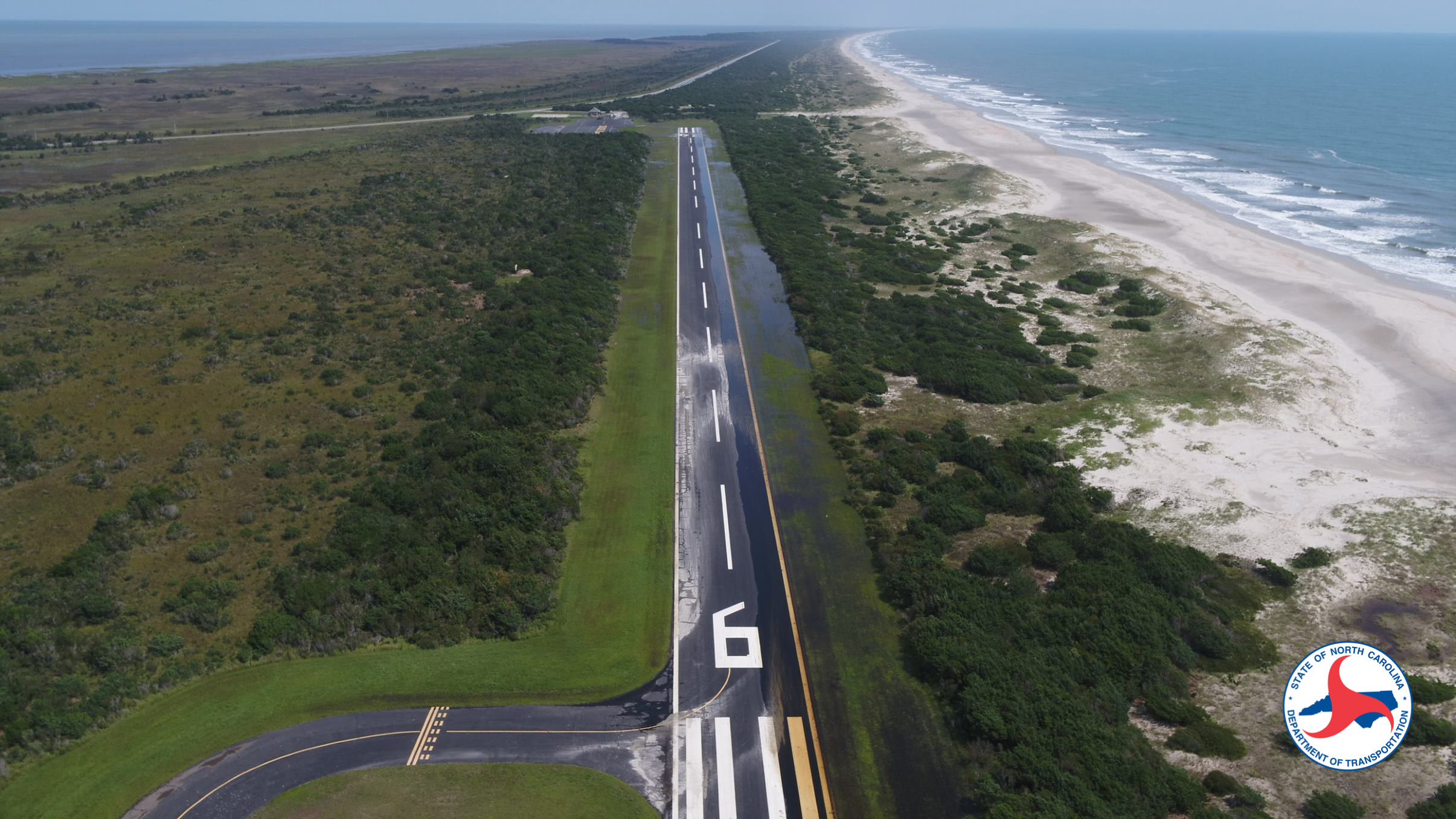
- IATA: none; ICAO: none; FAA LID: W95

Summary
- Airport type: Public
- Owner: U.S. National Park Service
- Operator: North Carolina Department of Transportation
- Serves: Ocracoke, North Carolina
- Location: Cape Hatteras National Seashore
- Elevation AMSL: 5 ft / 2 m
- Coordinates: 35°06′04″N 075°57′57″W

Map
- Location of airport in North Carolina

Runways
Direction	Length		Surface
Direction	ft	m	Surface
6/24	2,999	914	Asphalt

Helipads
Number	Length		Surface
Number	ft	m	Surface
H1	100	30	Concrete

Statistics (2009)
- Aircraft operations: 6,110
- Source: Federal Aviation Administration

Ocracoke Island Airport (FAA LID: W95) is a public use airport located one nautical mile (2 km) east of the central business district of Ocracoke, a town on Ocracoke Island in Hyde County, North Carolina, United States. It is located in the Cape Hatteras National Seashore, owned by U.S. National Park Service, and operated by the North Carolina Department of Transportation. This airport is included in the National Plan of Integrated Airport Systems for 2011–2015, which categorized it as a general aviation facility.

== Facilities and aircraft ==
Ocracoke Island Airport covers an area of 50 acres (20 ha) at an elevation of 5 feet (2 m) above mean sea level. It has one runway designated 6/24 with an asphalt surface measuring 2,999 by 60 feet (914 x 18 m). It also has one helipad designated H1 with a concrete surface measuring 100 by 100 feet (30 x 30 m).

For the 12-month period ending September 9, 2009, the airport had 6,110 aircraft operations, an average of 16 per day: 98% general aviation, 2% air taxi, and <1% military.

Airlines	Destinations
Outer Banks Airlines	Charter: Corolla, Frisco, Kill Devil Hills, Manteo

== See also ==
- List of airports in North Carolina
