= Marchman =

Marchman may refer to several people and places:

- Houston Marchman, alternative country musician
- Rutherford County Airport (Marchman Field), Rutherfordton, North Carolina
- F. K. Marchman Technical Center (high school), New Port Richey, Florida
