= W95 =

W95 may refer to:

- Ocracoke Island Airport, in Hyde County, North Carolina, United States
- Truncated great icosahedron
- Windows 95, an operating system
- W95, a classification in masters athletics
