= KHNZ =

KHNZ may refer to:

- Henderson–Oxford Airport (ICAO code KHNZ)
- KHNZ (FM), a radio station (101.3 FM) licensed to serve Lefors, Texas, United States
