= N22 =

N22 may refer to:

== Roads ==
- N22 road (Belgium)
- Route nationale 22, France
- N22 road (Ireland)
- Nebraska Highway 22, United States

== Bus routes ==
- London Buses route N22
- N22 (Long Island bus), New York

== Other uses ==
- Atlas V N22, an American expendable launch system
- GAF N22 Nomad, an Australian utility aircraft
- Nitrogen-22 an isotope of nitrogen
- Sky Manor Airport (North Carolina), United States, serving Jacksonville
- N22, a postcode district in the N postcode area of London
