= EXX =

EXX or exx can refer to:

- Davidson County Airport, an airport in Lexington, North Carolina, U.S.
- Exxaro, a South African mining company, by stock ticker
- International Air Corporation, an airline based in the United States, by ICAO airline code; see List of defunct airlines of the United Kingdom
- EXX, a microcontroller instruction for the Toshiba TLCS
- exx., a Latin abbreviation for multiple examples; see List of Latin abbreviations
