= IKB =

IKB may refer to:

== Science ==
- International Klein Blue, a deep blue hue
- IκB (I-kappa-B), a protein complex

== Other uses ==
- IKB Deutsche Industriebank, a German bank
- Ikebukuro Station (JR East station code), Japan
- Isambard Kingdom Brunel (1806–1859), British engineer
- Wilkes County Airport (IATA code), North Carolina, US
- Irving K. Barber Learning Centre, University of British Columbia, Canada
