= Twin Lakes Airport =

Twin Lakes Airport may refer to:

- Twin Lakes Airport (North Carolina) in Mocksville, North Carolina, United States (FAA: 8A7)
- Twin Lakes Airport (South Carolina) in Graniteville, South Carolina, United States (FAA: S17)
- closed Andros Central Airport near Andros Town, Andros Islands, the Bahamas
