= ACZ =

ACZ may refer to:

- Acheron language, a Niger–Congo language of Sudan.
- Henderson Field (North Carolina) (FAA LID airport code: ACZ), Wallace, US.
- Zabol Airport in Sistan and Baluchestan Province, Iran (IATA airport code ACZ).
- Ace Combat Zero: The Belkan War, a 2006 arcade flight simulation game.
