= Ocracoke (disambiguation) =

Ocracoke is a census-designated place at the southern end of Ocracoke Island, within Hyde County, North Carolina, United States.

Ocracoke may also refer to:

- Ocracoke Island Airport, an airport on the island
- Ocracoke Island Light, a lighthouse on Ocracoke island
- Ocracoke Inlet, the inlet at the southern end of Ocracoke Island
