= List of airports in North Carolina =

Commercial airports in North Carolina. Red dots represent large hub airports; Green dots represent medium hub airports; Blue dots represent small hub airports; Orange dots represent nonhub airports; Black dots represent reliever airports

This is a list of airports in North Carolina (a U.S. state), grouped by type and sorted by location. It contains all public-use and military airports in the state. Some private-use and former airports may be included where notable, such as airports that were previously public-use, those with commercial enplanements recorded by the FAA or airports assigned an IATA airport code. There are 498 airports in North Carolina, of which 391 are private use, and 107 are public use. 72 airports part of the NPIAS Airports are listed below.

== Airports ==
This list contains the following information:

- **City served** – The city generally associated with the airport, as per the airport's master record with the Federal Aviation Administration. This is not always the actual location since some airports are located in smaller towns outside of the city they serve. It is not meant to be a complete list of cities served, which can be found in or added to each airport's Wikipedia article.
- **FAA** – The location identifier assigned by the Federal Aviation Administration (FAA). These are linked to each airport's page at the North Carolina Department of Transportation.
- **IATA** – The airport code assigned by the International Air Transport Association (IATA). Those that do not match the FAA code are shown in bold.
- **ICAO** – The location indicator assigned by the International Civil Aviation Organization (ICAO).
- **Airport name** – The official airport name. Those shown in **bold** indicate the airport has scheduled passenger service on commercial airlines.
- **Role** – One of four FAA airport categories, as per the 2025–2029 National Plan of Integrated Airport Systems (NPIAS) report released September 2024:
  - P-s: Commercial service – primary are publicly owned airports that receive scheduled passenger service and have more than 10,000 passenger boardings (enplanements) each year. Each primary airport is sub-classified by the FAA as one of the following four "hub" types (s):
    - L: Large hub that accounts for at least 1% of total U.S. passenger enplanements.
    - M: Medium hub that accounts for between 0.25% and 1% of total U.S. passenger enplanements.
    - S: Small hub that accounts for between 0.05% and 0.25% of total U.S. passenger enplanements.
    - N: Nonhub that accounts for less than 0.05% of total U.S. passenger enplanements, but more than 10,000 annual enplanements.
  - CS: Commercial service – nonprimary are publicly owned airports that receive scheduled passenger service and have at least 2,500 passenger boardings each year.
  - R: Reliever airports are designated by the FAA to relieve congestion at a large commercial service airport and to provide more general aviation access to the overall community.
  - GA: General aviation airports are the largest single group of airports in the U.S. airport system. They are public-use airports that do not have scheduled service or have scheduled service with less than 2,500 passenger boardings each year.
- **Enplanements** – The number of enplanements (commercial passenger boardings) that occurred at the airport in calendar year 2024, as per FAA records released September 2025.

| City served | FAA | IATA | ICAO | Airport name | Role | Enplanements (2024) |
|---|---|---|---|---|---|---|
| | | | | **Commercial service – primary airports** | | |
| Asheville | AVL | AVL | KAVL | **Asheville Regional Airport** | P-S | 1,096,465 |
| Charlotte | CLT | CLT | KCLT | **Charlotte Douglas International Airport** | P-L | 28,523,822 |
| Concord | JQF | USA | KJQF | **Concord–Padgett Regional Airport** | P-N | 132,000 |
| Fayetteville | FAY | FAY | KFAY | **Fayetteville Regional Airport** (Grannis Field) | P-N | 168,117 |
| Greensboro | GSO | GSO | KGSO | **Piedmont Triad International Airport** | P-S | 985,563 |
| Greenville | PGV | PGV | KPGV | **Pitt–Greenville Airport** | P-N | 42,318 |
| Jacksonville | OAJ | OAJ | KOAJ | **Albert J. Ellis Airport** | P-N | 145,901 |
| New Bern | EWN | EWN | KEWN | **Coastal Carolina Regional Airport** (was Craven County Regional) | P-N | 86,653 |
| Raleigh | RDU | RDU | KRDU | **Raleigh–Durham International Airport** | P-M | 7,584,394 |
| Wilmington | ILM | ILM | KILM | **Wilmington International Airport** | P-S | 737,065 |
| | | | | **Reliever airports** | | |
| Monroe | EQY | | KEQY | Charlotte-Monroe Executive Airport (was Monroe Regional) | R | 62 |
| Sanford | TTA | | KTTA | Raleigh Executive Jetport at Sanford-Lee County (was Sanford-Lee Co. Regional) | R | 56 |
| | | | | **General aviation airports** | | |
| Ahoskie | ASJ | | KASJ | Tri-County Airport at Henry Joyner Field | GA | 0 |
| Albemarle | VUJ | | KVUJ | Stanly County Airport | GA | 0 |
| Andrews | RHP | | KRHP | Western Carolina Regional Airport (was Andrews-Murphy Airport) | GA | 10 |
| Asheboro | HBI | | KHBI | Asheboro Regional Airport (was Asheboro Municipal Airport) | GA | 7 |
| Beaufort | MRH | | KMRH | Michael J. Smith Field | GA | 49 |
| Burlington | BUY | | KBUY | Burlington-Alamance Regional Airport | GA | 15 |
| Clinton | CTZ | CTZ | KCTZ | Clinton-Sampson County Airport (was Sampson County Airport) | GA | 0 |
| Currituck | ONX | | KONX | Currituck County Regional Airport (was Currituck County Airport) | GA | 9 |
| Edenton | EDE | EDE | KEDE | Northeastern Regional Airport | GA | 11 |
| Elizabeth City | ECG | ECG | KECG | Elizabeth City Regional Airport / CGAS Elizabeth City | GA | 14 |
| Elizabethtown | EYF | | KEYF | Curtis L. Brown Jr. Field | GA | 0 |
| Elkin | ZEF | | KZEF | Elkin Municipal Airport | GA | 0 |
| Engelhard | 7W6 | | | Hyde County Airport | GA | 0 |
| Erwin | HRJ | | KHRJ | Harnett Regional Jetport (was Harnett County Airport) | GA | 2 |
| Franklin | 1A5 | | | Macon County Airport | GA | 45 |
| Gastonia | AKH | | KAKH | Gastonia Municipal Airport | GA | 5 |
| Goldsboro | GWW | | KGWW | Wayne Executive Jetport (was Goldsboro-Wayne Municipal Airport) | GA | 0 |
| Hatteras | HSE | HNC | KHSE | Billy Mitchell Airport | GA | 0 |
| Hickory | HKY | HKY | KHKY | Hickory Regional Airport | GA | 392 |
| Jefferson | GEV | | KGEV | Ashe County Airport | GA | 2 |
| Kenansville | DPL | | KDPL | Duplin County Airport | GA | 0 |
| Kill Devil Hills | FFA | FFA | KFFA | First Flight Airport | GA | 0 |
| Kinston | ISO | ISO | KISO | Kinston Regional Jetport at Stallings Field | GA | 9 |
| Lenoir | MRN | MRN | KMRN | Foothills Regional Airport (was Morganton-Lenoir Airport) | GA | 2 |
| Lexington | EXX | | KEXX | Davidson County Airport | GA | 1 |
| Lincolnton | IPJ | | KIPJ | Lincolnton-Lincoln County Regional Airport | GA | 2 |
| Louisburg | LHZ | LFN | KLHZ | Triangle North Executive Airport (was Franklin County Airport) | GA | 0 |
| Lumberton | LBT | LBT | KLBT | Lumberton Municipal Airport | GA | 0 |
| Manteo | MQI | MEO | KMQI | Dare County Regional Airport | GA | 15 |
| Maxton | MEB | MXE | KMEB | Laurinburg-Maxton Airport | GA | 0 |
| Mount Airy | MWK | | KMWK | Mount Airy/Surry County Airport | GA | 26 |
| Mount Olive | W40 | | | Mount Olive Municipal Airport | GA | 0 |
| North Wilkesboro | UKF | IKB | KUKF | Wilkes County Airport | GA | 8 |
| Ocean Isle Beach | 60J | | | Odell Williamson Municipal Airport (was Ocean Isle Airport) | GA | 10 |
| Ocracoke | W95 | | | Ocracoke Island Airport | GA | 7 |
| Oxford | HNZ | | KHNZ | Henderson-Oxford Airport (Oxford Henderson Airport) | GA | 0 |
| Plymouth | PMZ | | KPMZ | Plymouth Municipal Airport | GA | 0 |
| Reidsville | SIF | | KSIF | Rockingham County NC Shiloh Airport | GA | 0 |
| Roanoke Rapids | IXA | | KIXA | Halifax-Northampton Regional Airport | GA | 0 |
| Rockingham | RCZ | | KRCZ | Richmond County Airport (was Rockingham-Hamlet Airport) | GA | 4 |
| Rocky Mount | RWI | RWI | KRWI | Rocky Mount-Wilson Regional Airport | GA | 24 |
| Roxboro | TDF | TDF | KTDF | Raleigh Regional Airport at Person County | GA | 0 |
| Rutherfordton | FQD | | KFQD | Rutherford County Airport (Marchman Field) | GA | 5 |
| Salisbury | RUQ | SRW | KRUQ | Mid-Carolina Regional Airport (was Rowan County Airport) | GA | 0 |
| Shelby | EHO | | KEHO | Shelby-Cleveland County Regional Airport (was Shelby Municipal) | GA | 0 |
| Siler City | SCR | | KSCR | Siler City Municipal Airport | GA | 0 |
| Smithfield | JNX | | KJNX | Johnston Regional Airport | GA | 0 |
| Southern Pines | SOP | SOP | KSOP | Moore County Airport | GA | 129 |
| Southport | SUT | | KSUT | Cape Fear Regional Jetport (Howie Franklin Field) (was Brunswick County) | GA | 15 |
| Spruce Pine | 7A8 | | | Avery County Airport (Morrison Field) | GA | 0 |
| Star | 43A | | | Montgomery County Airport | GA | 0 |
| Statesville | SVH | SVH | KSVH | Statesville Regional Airport (was Statesville Municipal Airport) | GA | 15 |
| Sylva | 24A | | | Jackson County Airport | GA | 0 |
| Tarboro | ETC | | KETC | Tarboro-Edgecombe Airport (Tarboro-Edgecombe County) | GA | 0 |
| Wadesboro | AFP | | KAFP | Anson County Airport (Jeff Cloud Field) | GA | 0 |
| Wallace | ACZ | | KACZ | Henderson Field | GA | 0 |
| Washington | OCW | OCW | KOCW | Washington–Warren Airport (Warren Field) | GA | 4 |
| Whiteville | CPC | | KCPC | Columbus County Municipal Airport | GA | 0 |
| Williamston | MCZ | | KMCZ | Martin County Airport | GA | 0 |
| Winston-Salem | INT | INT | KINT | Smith Reynolds Airport | GA | 1,398 |
| | | | | **Other public-use airports** (not listed in NPIAS) | | |
| Bladenboro | 3W6 | | | Bladenboro Airport | | |
| Farmville | N08 | | | Flanagan Field | | |
| Fayetteville | 2GC | | | Grays Creek Airport | | |
| Greensboro | W88 | | | Air Harbor Airport | | |
| Greensboro | 3A4 | | | Southeast Greensboro Airport | | |
| Hendersonville | 0A7 | | | Hendersonville Airport | | |
| Hickory | E40 | | | Wilson's Airport | | |
| Holly Ridge | N21 | | | Holly Ridge/Topsail Island Airport | | |
| Hurdle Mills | 4W4 | | | Whitfield Farms Airport | | |
| Indian Trail | 28A | | | Goose Creek Airport | | |
| Jacksonville | N22 | | | Sky Manor Airport | | |
| Jonesville | 78A | | | Swan Creek Airport | | |
| Julian | N88 | | | Kecks Airport | | |
| Knightdale | W17 | | | Raleigh East Airport | | |
| Liberty | 2A5 | | | Causey Airport | | |
| Liberty | N61 | | | Hinshaw (Greenacres) Airport | | |
| Maiden | N92 | | | Laneys Airport | | |
| Marion | 9A9 | | | Shiflet Field | | |
| Mocksville | 8A7 | | | Twin Lakes Airport | | |
| Mooresville | 14A | | | Lake Norman Airpark | | |
| Oak Ridge | N83 | | | DS Butler Farm and Airfield | | |
| Plymouth | 7NC | | | Donald's Air Park | | |
| Raeford | 5W4 | | | P K Airpark | | |
| Raleigh | 5W5 | | | Triple W Airport | | |
| Reidsville | 6A5 | | | Warf Airport | | |
| Taylorsville | NC2 | | | Taylorsville Airport | | |
| Thomasville | N97 | | | Hiatt Airport | | |
| Walnut Cove | N63 | | | Meadow Brook Field | | |
| Waxhaw | N52 | | | JAARS-Townsend Airport | | |
| Wilson | W03 | | | Wilson Industrial Air Center | | |
| Winterville | 05N | | | South Oaks Aerodrome | | |
| Yadkinville | 80C | | | Lone Hickory Airport | | |
| Yanceyville | 6W4 | | | Yanceyville Municipal Airport | | |
| | | | | **Other military airports** | | |
| Atlantic | 12NC | | | MCOF Atlantic | | |
| Camp Mackall | HFF | HFF | KHFF | Mackall Army Airfield (at Camp Mackall) | | |
| Cherry Point | NKT | NKT | KNKT | MCAS Cherry Point (Cunningham Field) | | |
| Fort Bragg | POB | POB | KPOB | Pope Field | | 9,002 |
| Fort Bragg | FBG | FBG | KFBG | Simmons Army Airfield (at Fort Bragg) | | |
| Goldsboro | GSB | GSB | KGSB | Seymour Johnson AFB | | 898 |
| Holly Ridge | 14NC | | | MCOF Camp Davis (former Camp Davis AAF) | | |
| Jacksonville | NCA | | KNCA | MCAS New River (McCutcheon Field) | | |
| Pollocksville | 13NC | | | MCOF Oak Grove | | |
| Swansboro | NJM | | KNJM | MCALF Bogue (Bogue Field) | | |
| | | | | **Notable private-use airports** | | |
| Banner Elk | NC06 | | | Elk River Airport | | 4 |
| Brevard | 3NR3 | | | Transylvania County Airport (was public-use, FAA: 22W) | | |
| Clarkton | 2NR2 | | | Elkins Field (was public-use, FAA: 1E6) | | |
| Corolla | 7NC2 | DUF | | Pine Island Airport | | 10 |
| Huntersville | NC05 | | | Bradford Field | | |
| Mocksville | 5NC2 | | | Sugar Valley Airport (was public use, FAA: 31A) | | |
| Morganton | 92NC | | | Grace Hospital Heliport | | 17,122 |
| Pink Hill | NR10 | | | Pink Hill Airport | | |
| | | | | **Notable former airports** | | |
| Archdale | ~~72A~~ | | | Johnson Field (closed 2006?) | | |
| Chapel Hill | ~~IGX~~ | | ~~KIGX~~ | Horace Williams Airport (closed 2018) | | |
| Charlotte | ~~9A3~~ | | | Brockenbrough Airport (closed 1986) | | |
| Charlotte | ~~8A6~~ | ~~QWG~~ | | Wilgrove Air Park (closed 2020) | | |
| Mebane | ~~4W7~~ | | | Hurdle Field | | |
| Potters Hill | ~~6N9~~ | | | Eagles Nest Airport | | |
| Roanoke Rapids | ~~RZZ~~ | ~~RZZ~~ | ~~KRZZ~~ | Halifax County Airport (closed permanently) | ~~GA~~ | |

== See also ==
- North Carolina World War II Army Airfields
- Wikipedia:WikiProject Aviation/Airline destination lists: North America#North Carolina
