= Sky Manor Airport =

Sky Manor Airport may refer to:

- Sky Manor Airport (New Jersey) in Pittstown, New Jersey, United States (FAA: N40)
- Sky Manor Airport (North Carolina) in Jacksonville, North Carolina, United States (FAA: N22)
