= Wilson Airport (disambiguation) =

Wilson Airport is an airport in Nairobi, Kenya, Africa (IATA: WIL).

Wilson Airport may also refer to:

- Wilson Airport (Arkansas) in Stephens, Arkansas, United States (FAA: 4F8)

Similar names:

- Rocky Mount–Wilson Regional Airport in Rocky Mount/Wilson, North Carolina, United States (FAA/IATA: RWI)
- Wilson Industrial Air Center in Wilson, North Carolina, United States (FAA: W03)
- Wilson's Airport in Hickory, North Carolina, United States (FAA: E40)
- Wilson Ranch Airport, in Crooke County, Oregon, United States (FAA: OG12)
