= LFN =

LFN may refer to:

- La Familia Network, US Spanish TV network
- La Femme Nikita (TV series)
- Lingua Franca Nova, a constructed language
- Long fat network, a data network with large bandwidth-delay
- Long filename, longer than 8.3 bytes in Microsoft FAT
- Triangle North Executive Airport, FAA LID
