= Ashe County Airport =

- IATA: none; ICAO: KGEV; FAA LID: GEV

Summary
- Airport type: Public
- Owner: Ashe County
- Serves: Jefferson, North Carolina
- Elevation AMSL: 3,178 ft (969 m)
- Coordinates: 36°25′57″N 081°25′11″W
- Website: https://www.ashecountygov.com/departments/airport

Map
- Location of airport in North Carolina

Runways
Direction	Length		Surface
Direction	ft	m	Surface
10/28	4,296	1,309	Asphalt

Statistics (2011)
- Aircraft operations: 10,400
- Based aircraft: 32
- Source: Federal Aviation Administration

Ashe County Airport (ICAO: KGEV, FAA LID: GEV) is a county-owned, public-use airport in Ashe County, North Carolina, United States. It is located three nautical miles (6 km) east of the central business district of Jefferson, North Carolina. This airport is included in the National Plan of Integrated Airport Systems for 2011–2015, which categorized it as a general aviation facility. It was activated in August 1977, and runs 24/7, except on Christmas day and Thanksgiving.

Although most U.S. airports use the same three-letter location identifier for the FAA and IATA, Ashe County Airport is assigned GEV by the FAA but has no designation from the IATA (which assigned GEV to Gällivare Airport in Gällivare, Sweden). The airport's ICAO identifier is KGEV. The airport is under the Hartsfield-Jackson ARTCC, and its flight service station is in Raleigh-Durham Airport; NOTAMs are issued to Ashe County Airport there as well. The facilities receive a $150,000 entitlement from the FAA yearly.

== Facilities and aircraft ==
Ashe County Airport covers an area of 106 acres (43 ha) at an elevation of 3,178 feet (969 m) above mean sea level. It has one runway designated 10/28 with an asphalt surface measuring 5001 by 75 feet (1,524 x 23 m). Refueling services are provided by the county.

For the 12-month period ending August 19, 2011, the airport had 10,400 aircraft operations, an average of 28 per day: 95% general aviation and 5% military. At that time there were 32 aircraft based at this airport: 97% single-engine and 3% multi-engine.

The airport became a base of operations for relief efforts following Hurricane Helene. NC Air National Guard flew CH-47 Chinooks and UH-60 Black Hawks into the airport, and civilians flew their personal planes in from across the country.

== See also ==
- List of airports in North Carolina
