= Asheboro Regional Airport =

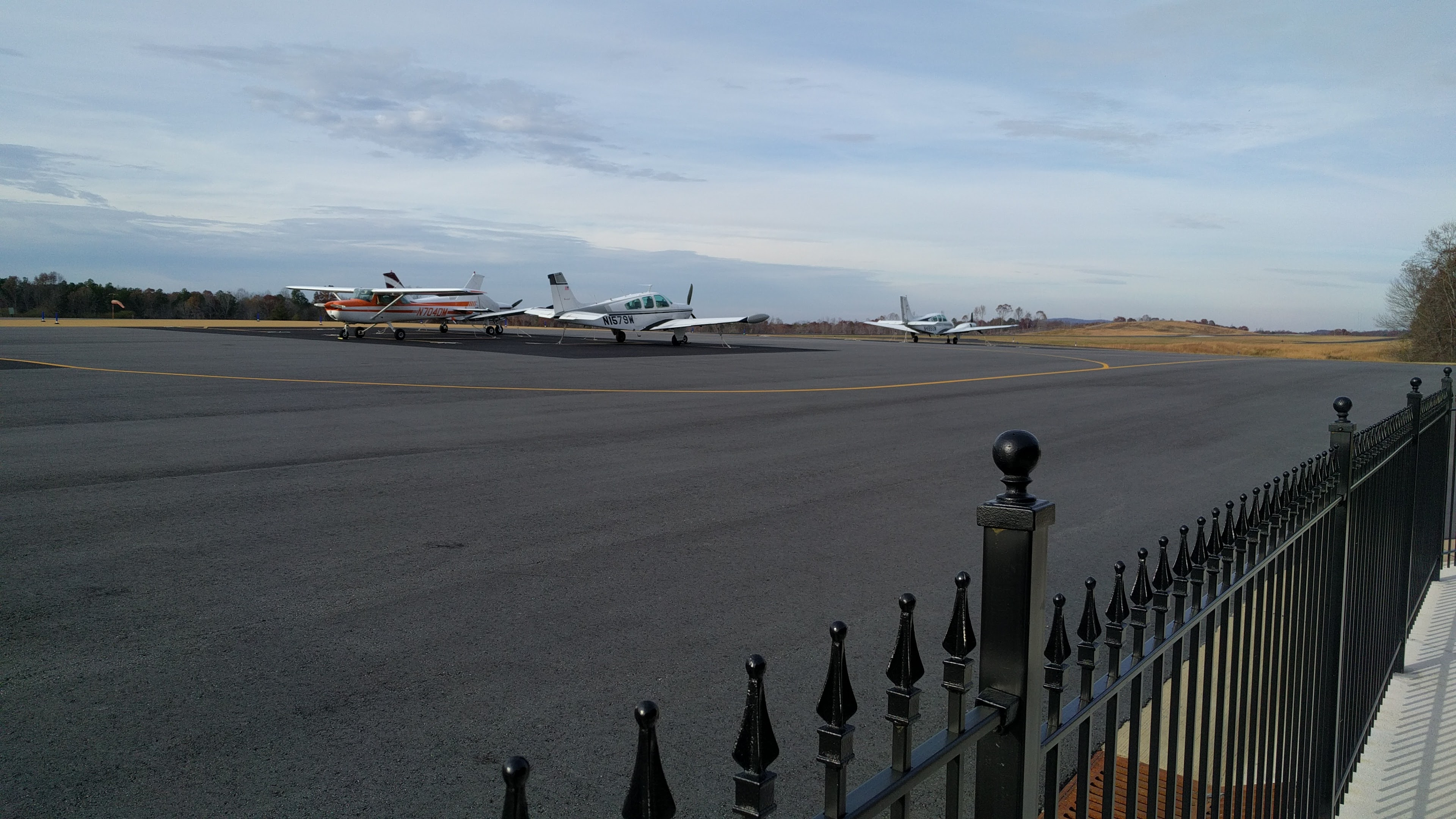
- IATA: none; ICAO: KHBI; FAA LID: HBI

Summary
- Airport type: Public
- Owner: City of Asheboro
- Serves: Asheboro, North Carolina
- Elevation AMSL: 671 ft (205 m)
- Coordinates: 35°39′16″N 079°53′41″W
- Interactive map of Asheboro Regional Airport

Runways
Direction	Length		Surface
Direction	ft	m	Surface
3/21	5,501	1,677	Asphalt

Statistics (2008)
- Aircraft operations: 15,500
- Based aircraft: 45
- Source: Federal Aviation Administration

Asheboro Regional Airport (ICAO: KHBI, FAA LID: HBI) is a city-owned public-use airport located six nautical miles (11 km) southwest of the central business district of Asheboro, a city in Randolph County, North Carolina, United States. It was formerly known as Asheboro Municipal Airport.

Although many U.S. airports use the same three-letter location identifier for the FAA and IATA, this facility is assigned HBI by the FAA but has no designation from the IATA (which assigned HBI to Harbour Island in the Bahamas).

== Facilities and aircraft ==
Asheboro Regional Airport covers an area of 454 acres (184 ha) at an elevation of 671 feet (205 m) above mean sea level. It has one runway designated 3/21 with an asphalt surface measuring 5,501 by 100 feet (1,677 x 30 m).

For the 12-month period ending July 7, 2008, the airport had 15,500 aircraft operations, an average of 42 per day: 97% general aviation and 3% military. At that time there were 45 aircraft based at this airport: 78% single-engine, 20% multi-engine and 2% jet.

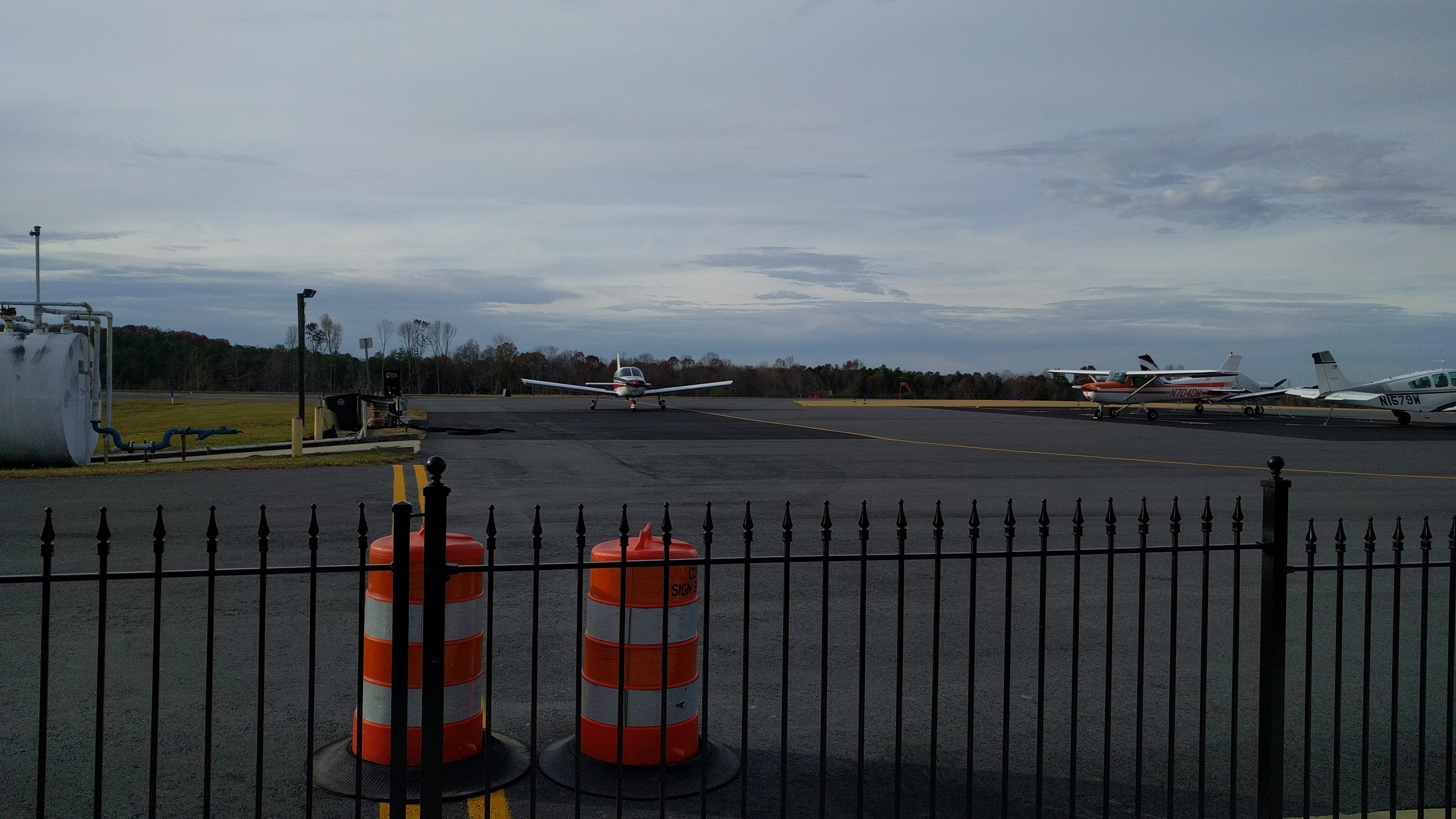
Plane pulling up to get fuel in Asheboro

== See also ==
- List of airports in North Carolina
