= Hyde County Airport =

- IATA: none; ICAO: none; FAA LID: 7W6

Summary
- Airport type: Public
- Owner: Hyde County
- Serves: Hyde County, North Carolina
- Location: Engelhard, North Carolina
- Elevation AMSL: 8 ft (2.4 m)
- Coordinates: 35°33′44″N 075°57′20″W

Map
- Location of airport in North Carolina

Runways
Direction	Length		Surface
Direction	ft	m	Surface
11/29	4,700	1,433	Asphalt

Statistics (2009)
- Aircraft operations: 4,050
- Source: Federal Aviation Administration

Hyde County Airport (FAA LID: 7W6) is a county-owned, public-use airport in Hyde County, North Carolina, United States. It is located seven nautical miles (8 mi, 13 km) north of the central business district of Engelhard, North Carolina. This airport is included in the National Plan of Integrated Airport Systems for 2011–2015, which categorized it as a general aviation facility.

== Facilities and aircraft ==
Hyde County Airport covers an area of 387 acres (157 ha) at an elevation of 8 feet (2 m) above mean sea level. It has one runway designated 11/29 with an asphalt surface measuring 4,700 by 100 feet (1,433 x 30 m). For the 12-month period ending September 19, 2009, the airport had 4,050 aircraft operations, an average of 11 per day: 86% general aviation, 12% military, and 1% air taxi.

== See also ==
- List of airports in North Carolina
