= Mid-Carolina Regional Airport =

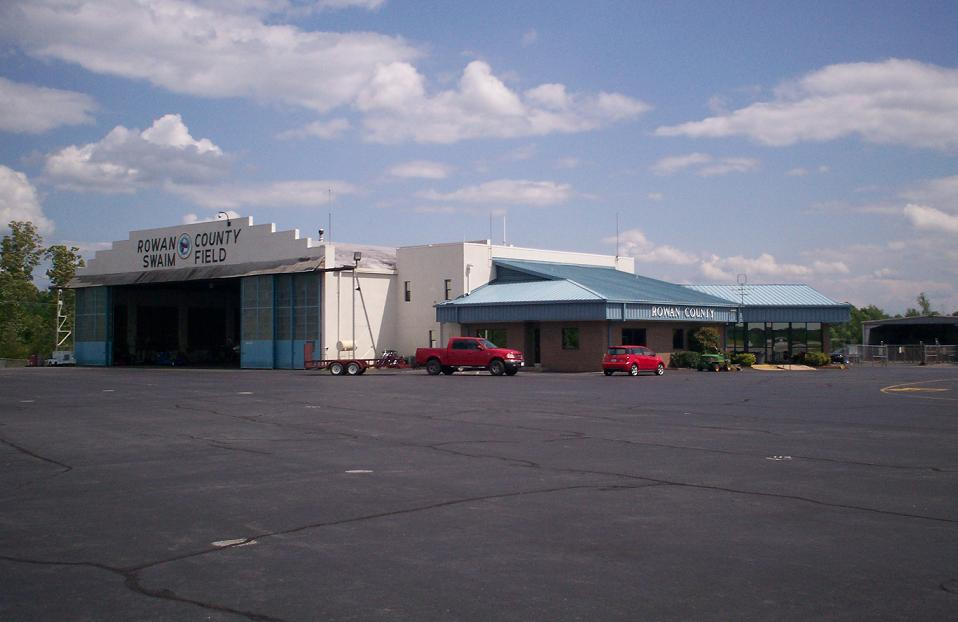
- Terminal at Mid-Carolina Regional Airport
- IATA: SRW; ICAO: KRUQ; FAA LID: RUQ

Summary
- Airport type: Public
- Owner: Rowan County
- Serves: Salisbury, North Carolina
- Elevation AMSL: 772 ft / 235 m
- Coordinates: 35°38′45″N 080°31′13″W
- Website: www.rowancountync.gov/149/Airport
- Interactive map of Mid-Carolina Regional Airport

Runways
Direction	Length		Surface
Direction	ft	m	Surface
2/20	5,501	1,677	Asphalt

Mid-Carolina Regional Airport (IATA: SRW, ICAO: KRUQ, FAA LID: RUQ) (formerly Rowan County Airport) is a public airport located three miles (5 km) southwest of the central business district (CBD) of Salisbury, a city in Rowan County, North Carolina, USA. This general aviation airport covers 400 acres (162 ha) and has one runway.

Although most U.S. airports use the same three-letter location identifier for the FAA and IATA, Mid-Carolina Regional Airport is assigned RUQ by the FAA and SRW by the IATA. The airport's ICAO identifier is KRUQ.

== History ==
Previously the Rowan County Airport, its name was change in September 2016 to the Mid-Carolina Regional Airport.

== Services ==
There are rental cars available for transportation. Aircraft maintenance, painting and interiors, and avionics installation and repair are also available. The airport also offers a flight school, a pilot's lounge, and office space rental.

== See also ==
- List of airports in North Carolina
