= Montgomery County Airport (North Carolina) =

- IATA: none; ICAO: none; FAA LID: 43A

Summary
- Airport type: Public
- Owner/Operator: Montgomery County
- Location: Star, North Carolina
- Elevation AMSL: 633 ft / 193 m
- Coordinates: 35°23′05″N 079°47′25″W
- Interactive map of Montgomery County Airport

Runways
Direction	Length		Surface
Direction	ft	m	Surface
3/21	4,002	1,220	Asphalt

Statistics (2022)
- Aircraft operations: 4,800
- Based aircraft: 10
- Source: Federal Aviation Administration

Montgomery County Airport (FAA LID: 43A) is a public use airport located in Star, a city in Montgomery County, North Carolina, United States. It is owned and operated by Montgomery County.

== Facilities and aircraft ==
Montgomery County Airport covers an area of 83 acres (34 ha) at an elevation of 633 feet (193 m) above mean sea level. It has one asphalt paved runway designated 3/21 which measures 4,002 by 75 feet (1,220 x 23 m).

For the 12-month period ending July 3, 2022, the airport had 4,800 aircraft operations, an average of 13 per day: 58% general aviation and 42% military. At that time there were 10 aircraft based at this airport, all single-engine.

== See also ==
- List of airports in North Carolina
