= Pink Hill Airport =

- IATA: none; ICAO: none; FAA LID: NR10 (formerly 4W9)

Summary
- Airport type: Public use
- Owner: Pink Hill Aero Club
- Serves: Pink Hill, North Carolina
- Elevation AMSL: 144 ft / 44 m
- Coordinates: 35°03′03″N 077°44′10″W
- Interactive map of Pink Hill Airport

Runways
Direction	Length		Surface
Direction	ft	m	Surface
1/19	2,800	853	Turf

Statistics (2011)
- Aircraft operations: 450
- Based aircraft: 6
- Source: Federal Aviation Administration

Pink Hill Airport (FAA LID: NR10 (formerly 4W9)) is a privately owned, public use airport located one nautical mile (2 km) east of the central business district of Pink Hill, a town in Lenoir County, North Carolina, United States.

== Facilities and aircraft ==
Pink Hill Airport covers an area of 5 acres (2 ha) at an elevation of 144 feet (44 m) above mean sea level. It has one runway designated 1/19 with a turf surface measuring 2,800 by 85 feet (853 x 26 m).

For the 12-month period ending October 22, 2011, the airport had 450 aircraft operations, an average of 37 per month: 78% general aviation and 22% military. At that time there were 6 aircraft based at this airport, all single-engine.

== See also ==
- List of airports in North Carolina
