= Bradford Field (North Carolina) =

- IATA: none; ICAO: none; FAA LID: NC05

Summary
- Airport type: Private
- Owner: W. O. & Cecil D. Bradford
- Location: Huntersville, North Carolina
- Elevation AMSL: 649 ft (198 m)
- Coordinates: 35°24′32″N 080°47′39″W
- Interactive map of Bradford Field

Runways
Direction	Length		Surface
Direction	ft	m	Surface
6/24	3,850	1,173	Turf

Statistics
- Aircraft operations: 9,400
- Based aircraft: 64
- Source: Federal Aviation Administration

Bradford Field (FAA LID: NC05) is a private-use airport located three miles (4.8 km) east of the central business district of Huntersville, a town in Mecklenburg County, North Carolina, United States. It is privately owned by W. O. & Cecil D. Bradford. It was opened in the late 1960s by the Bradford brothers at the request of a few private aircraft owners in the town of Huntersville. The original turf airport in Huntersville was little more than a fenced-in cow pasture located at one end of the Meacham farm south of Huntersville. A minor aircraft accident involving a Piper J-3 "Cub" and the subsequent FAA investigation led to the closing of Meacham field, and the forced relocation of the two aircraft hangared there.

Bradford Field initially operated with only two aircraft a Beechcraft Staggerwing biplane and the repaired Piper J-3 involved in the Meacham Field accident. There were no hangars, or refueling facilities. In the early 1970s a single row of aircraft hangars were added as well as a refueling station and a small 30x30 foot concrete building. The building housed a small lounge, restrooms and an office.

The airport continued to expand and by the late seventies had two rows of hangars and had close to 35 aircraft.

== Facilities and aircraft ==
Bradford Field has one runway (6/24) with a turf surface measuring 3,850 ft × 150 ft (1,173 m × 46 m). For a 12-month period (date unknown), the airport had 9,400 general aviation aircraft operations, an average of 25 per day. There are 64 single-engine aircraft based at this airport.

== See also ==
- List of airports in North Carolina
