= Transylvania County Airport =

- IATA: none; ICAO: none; FAA LID: 3NR3

Summary
- Airport type: Private
- Owner: Fethi Korkmaz
- Serves: Transylvania County
- Location: Brevard, North Carolina
- Elevation AMSL: 2,110 ft / 643 m
- Coordinates: 35°16′13″N 082°38′39″W
- Interactive map of Transylvania County Airport

Runways
Direction	Length		Surface
Direction	ft	m	Surface
9/27	2,903	885	Asphalt

Statistics (2007)
- Aircraft operations: 1,315
- Based aircraft: 47
- Source: Federal Aviation Administration

Transylvania County Airport (FAA LID: 3NR3) is a public use airport in Transylvania County, North Carolina, United States. It is located four nautical miles (7 km) east of the central business district of Brevard.

== Facilities and aircraft ==
Transylvania County Airport covers an area of 16 acres (6.5 ha) at an elevation of 2,110 feet (643 m) above mean sea level. It has one runway designated 9/27 with an asphalt surface measuring 2,903 by 50 feet (885 x 15 m).

For the 12-month period ending August 20, 2007, the airport had 1,315 aircraft operations, an average of 109 per month: 99% general aviation and 1% air taxi. At that time there were 47 aircraft based at this airport: 92% single-engine, 4% multi-engine, 2% glider and 2% ultralight.

== See also ==
- List of airports in North Carolina
