= Mount Olive Municipal Airport =

Municipal airport in North Carolina

- IATA: none; ICAO: none; FAA LID: W40

Summary
- Airport type: Public
- Owner: City of Mount Olive
- Serves: Mount Olive, North Carolina
- Location: Mount Olive, North Carolina
- Coordinates: 35°13′20″N 78°02′20″W
- Interactive map of Mount Olive Municipal Airport

Runways
Direction	Length		Surface
Direction	ft	m	Surface
05/23	5,251	1,601	Asphalt

Mount Olive Municipal Airport is an airport serving Wayne County in eastern North Carolina. The airport opened in 1967. The airport hosts private and corporate aircraft. The airport can handle a wheel-bearing intensity of 47,500 pounds. There are no military landing fees, and the military does have landing rights. There also is no non-commercial landing fee at the airport.

The airport has a terminal building with pilot amenities. The owner is the city of Mount Olive. The sole runway has a hard asphalt surface and is 5,251 feet (1,601 m) long.

== See also ==
- List of airports in North Carolina
