= Shiflet Field =

- IATA: none; ICAO: none; FAA LID: 9A9

Summary
- Airport type: Public use
- Owner: Marion Airport Commission
- Serves: Marion, North Carolina
- Elevation AMSL: 1,212 ft / 369 m
- Coordinates: 35°43′14″N 082°00′35″W

Map
- Location of airport in North Carolina

Runways
Direction	Length		Surface
Direction	ft	m	Surface
10/28	3,340	1,018	Turf

Statistics (2021)
- Aircraft operations (year ending 5/21/2021): 4,350
- Based aircraft: 59
- Source: Federal Aviation Administration

Shiflet Field (FAA LID: 9A9) is a public use airport located three nautical miles (6 km) north of the central business district of Marion, a city in McDowell County, North Carolina, United States. It is owned by the Marion Airport Commission.

== Facilities and aircraft ==
Shiflet Field covers an area of 30 acres (12 ha) at an elevation of 1,212 feet (369 m) above mean sea level. It has one runway designated 10/28 with a turf surface measuring 3,340 by 180 feet (1,018 x 55 m).

For the 12-month period ending May 21, 2021, the airport had 4,350 aircraft operations, an average of 83 per week: 99% general aviation and 1% military. At that time there were 59 aircraft based at this airport: 55 single-engine, 1 multi-engine, 1 helicopter, and 2 ultralight.

== See also ==
- List of airports in North Carolina
