= Foothills Regional Airport =

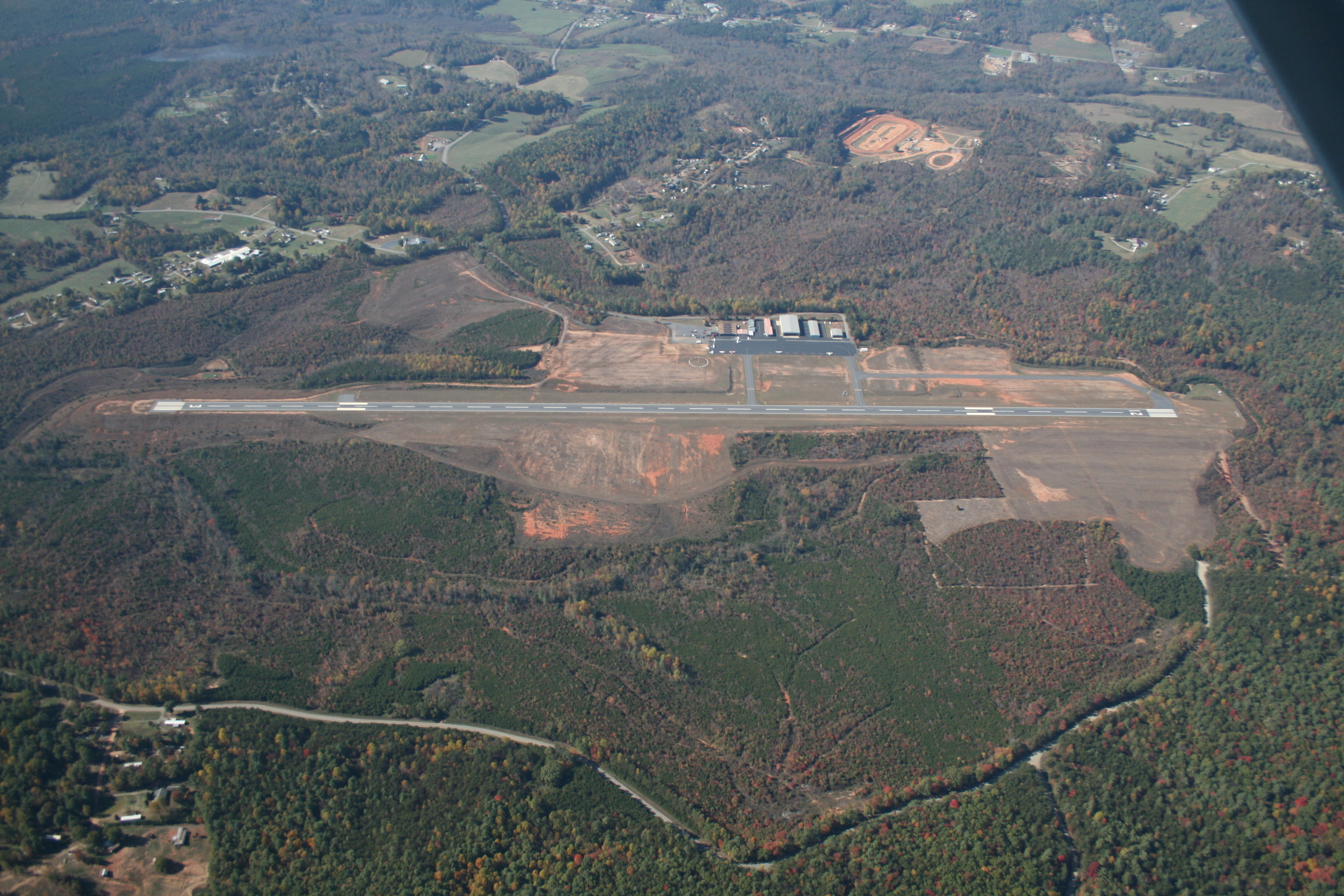
- IATA: MRN; ICAO: KMRN; FAA LID: MRN

Summary
- Airport type: Public
- Owner: Foothills Regional Airport Authority
- Serves: Morganton, North Carolina, US Lenoir, North Carolina, US
- Elevation AMSL: 1,270 ft (390 m)
- Coordinates: 35°49′13″N 081°36′41″W
- Interactive map of Foothills Regional Airport

Runways
| Direction | Length | | Surface |
| Direction | ft | m | Surface |
|---|---|---|---|
| 3/21 | 5,500 | 1,676 | Asphalt |

Statistics (2005)
- Aircraft operations: 17,000
- Source: Federal Aviation Administration

Foothills Regional Airport (formerly Morganton-Lenoir Airport) (IATA: MRN, ICAO: KMRN, FAA LID: MRN) is a public airport located nine miles south of the City of Lenoir, NC, and eight miles northeast of the City of Morganton, NC. It is owned by the Foothills Regional Airport Authority.

== Facilities and aircraft ==
The Foothills Regional Airport covers an area of 1,170 acres (473 ha) and contains one grooved asphalt paved runway: 3/21 measuring 5,500 ft × 75 ft (1,676 m × 23 m). For the 12-month period ending August 31, 2005, the airport had 17,000 aircraft operations, an average of 46 per day: 97% general aviation and 3% military. There were 74 aircraft based on the field at that time.

== See also ==
- List of airports in North Carolina
