= Elkins Field =

Airport in Bladen County, North Carolina

- IATA: none; ICAO: none

Summary
- Airport type: Public use
- Owner: Ande Kyle Elkins
- Serves: Clarkton, North Carolina
- Location: Bladen County, North Carolina
- Elevation AMSL: 93 ft (28 m)
- Coordinates: 34°27′28″N 078°37′06″W

Map
- Location of airport in North Carolina

Runways
Direction	Length		Surface
Direction	ft	m	Surface
1/19	2,000	610	Turf

Statistics (2007)
- Aircraft operations: 300
- Based aircraft: 1
- Source: Federal Aviation Administration

Elkins Field (FAA LID: 2NR2) is a privately owned, public use airport in Bladen County, North Carolina, United States. It is located three nautical miles (6 km) east of the central business district of Clarkton, North Carolina.

== Facilities and aircraft ==
Elkins Field has one runway designated 1/19 with a turf surface measuring 2,000 by 75 feet (610 x 23 m).

For the 12-month period ending September 21, 2007, the airport had 300 general aviation aircraft operations, an average of 25 per month. At that time there were one single-engine aircraft based at this airport.

== See also ==
- List of airports in North Carolina
