= Odell Williamson Municipal Airport =

Public airport in North Carolina

- IATA: none; ICAO: none; FAA LID: 60J

Summary
- Airport type: Public
- Owner: Town of Ocean Isle Beach
- Location: Ocean Isle Beach, North Carolina
- Opened: April 1971
- Elevation AMSL: 32 ft / 10 m
- Coordinates: 33°54′33.5″N 78°26′4.8″W

Map
- Location of airport in North Carolina

Runways
Direction	Length		Surface
Direction	ft	m	Surface
06/24	4,198	1,280	Asphalt

Odell Williamson Municipal Airport (FAA LID: 60J), formerly known as Ocean Isle Airport, is a public use general aviation airport serving the resort town of Ocean Isle Beach in Brunswick County, North Carolina, United States. The airport is located 1 mile (1.6 km) north of Ocean Isle Beach and 6 miles (9.7 km) southwest of Shallotte.

== Facilities and operations ==
Odell Williamson Municipal Airport is owned by the Town of Ocean Isle Beach. It features one paved asphalt runway, designated 6/24. It is 4,198 ft (1,280 m) x 75 ft (23 m) in length. The facility does not have any hangars, but does offer tie-downs at a monthly or yearly rate.

In 2022, the airport had 15 based aircraft and 20,500 annual aircraft operations.

== History ==
The airport was opened in April 1971 as Ocean Isle Airport. Its current name is in honor of Odell Williamson (1919–2010), a prominent politician from Brunswick County who served in the NC House of Representatives from 1946 to 1968 and later became the wealthiest man in Brunswick County, owning most of the land on Ocean Isle Beach and contributing heavily to the development of infrastructure in the county.

In 2018, the airport received a $1.2 million grant from the NC Department of Transportation for land acquisition, utilities, and the preliminary engineering of an expanded runway protection zone.

== See also ==
- List of airports in North Carolina
