= Burlington–Alamance Regional Airport =

Airport in North Carolina, United States

- IATA: none; ICAO: KBUY; FAA LID: BUY

Summary
- Airport type: Public
- Owner: Burlington–Alamance Airport Authority
- Serves: Burlington, North Carolina
- Elevation AMSL: 616 ft (188 m)
- Coordinates: 36°02′55″N 079°28′30″W

Map
- Location of airport in North Carolina

Runways
Direction	Length		Surface
Direction	ft	m	Surface
6/24	6,405	1,952	Asphalt

Statistics (2011)
- Aircraft operations: 50,450is
- Based aircraft: 123
- Source: Federal Aviation Administration

Burlington–Alamance Regional Airport (ICAO: KBUY, FAA LID: BUY) is a public use airport in Alamance County, North Carolina, United States. It is located three nautical miles (6 km) southwest of the central business district of Burlington, North Carolina, and is owned by the Burlington–Alamance Airport Authority. This airport is included in the National Plan of Integrated Airport Systems for 2011–2015, which categorized it as a general aviation facility.

Although most U.S. airports use the same three-letter location identifier for the FAA and IATA, this airport is assigned BUY by the FAA but has no designation from the IATA (which assigned BUY to Bunbury Airport in Bunbury, Western Australia, Australia). The airport's ICAO identifier is KBUY.

Burlington–Alamance is a small airport, serving small planes like Cessnas and rebuilt Mustangs. It also has a pilot training school. There is no charge for landing or taking off at the airport; it makes money through the sale of fuel and hangar space.

== History ==
On September 18, 2008, it was announced that the one runway at Burlington–Alamance, runway 6/24, would be extended from 5,000 feet to 6,400 feet. The main reason for the runway extension was to connect the airport to the new Honda Aero headquarters and manufacturing plant. Construction was completed in 2012.

== Facilities and aircraft ==
Burlington–Alamance Regional Airport covers an area of 500 acres (202 ha) at an elevation of 616 feet (188 m) above mean sea level. It has one runway designated 6/24 with an asphalt surface measuring 6,405 by 99 feet.

For the 12-month period ending August 5, 2011, the airport had 50,450 aircraft operations, an average of 138 per day: 97% general aviation, 2% air taxi, and 1% military. At that time there were 123 aircraft based at this airport: 81% single-engine, 15% multi-engine, 4% jet, and 1% helicopter.

== See also ==
- List of airports in North Carolina
