= Richmond County Airport =

Airport in North Carolina, United States

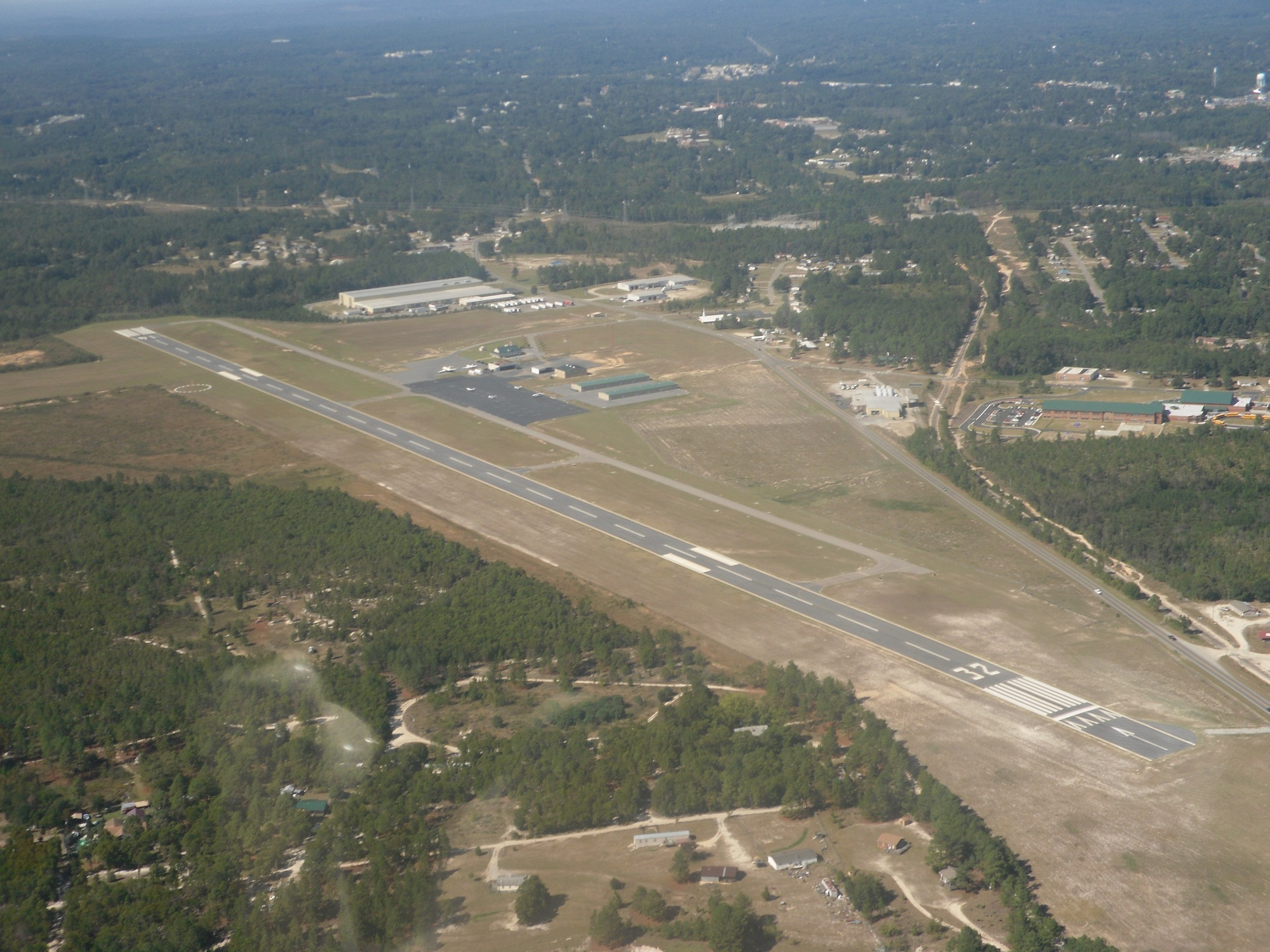
- IATA: none; ICAO: KRCZ; FAA LID: RCZ

Summary
- Airport type: Public
- Owner: Richmond County
- Serves: Rockingham, North Carolina
- Elevation AMSL: 358 ft / 109.1 m
- Coordinates: 34°53′29″N 79°45′35″W
- Interactive map of Richmond County Airport

Runways
Direction	Length		Surface
Direction	ft	m	Surface
14/32	5,000	1,524	Asphalt
4/22	3,000	914	Grass

Richmond County Airport (ICAO: KRCZ, FAA LID: RCZ), formerly known as Rockingham-Hamlet Airport, is a public airport located in and operated by Richmond County, North Carolina. It is situated three miles (5 km) south of the city of Rockingham and west of the city of Hamlet. The airport is used entirely for general aviation and has undergone major renovations and expansion in recent years.

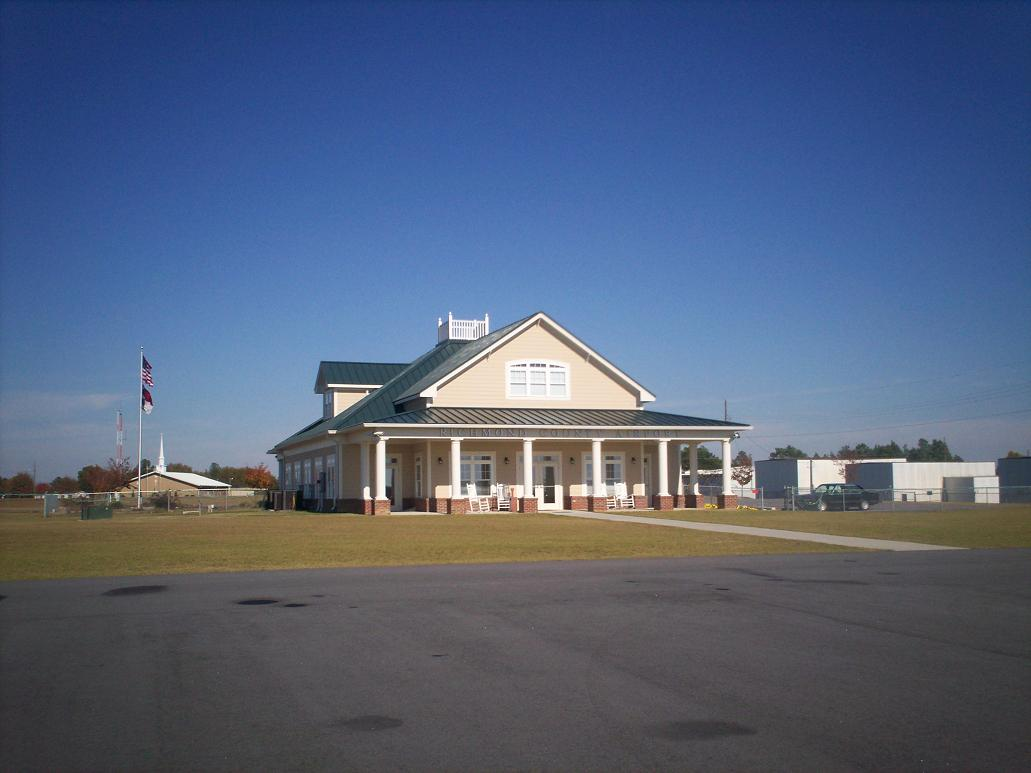
Terminal at Richmond County Airport

== Facilities ==
Richmond County Airport covers 316 acres (128 ha) and has two runways:

- Runway 4/22: 3,000 x 500 ft. (914 x 152 m), Surface: Turf
- Runway 14/32: 5,000 x 100 ft. (1,524 x 30 m), Surface: Asphalt

== See also ==
- List of airports in North Carolina
