= Lincolnton–Lincoln County Regional Airport =

Airport in Lincolnton, U.S

Lincoln County Regional Airport
- IATA: none; ICAO: KIPJ; FAA LID: IPJ

Summary
- Airport type: Public
- Owner: City of Lincolnton & Lincoln County
- Serves: Lincolnton, North Carolina
- Elevation AMSL: 877 ft (267 m)
- Coordinates: 35°29′00″N 081°09′40″W
- Interactive map of Lincoln County Regional Airport

Runways
Direction	Length		Surface
Direction	ft	m	Surface
5/23	5,500	1,676	Asphalt

Statistics (2008)
- Aircraft operations: 34,100
- Based aircraft: 71
- Source: Federal Aviation Administration

Lincoln County Regional Airport (ICAO: KIPJ, FAA LID: IPJ) is a public use airport located five nautical miles (9 km) east of the central business district of Lincolnton, a city in Lincoln County, North Carolina, United States. It is owned by Lincoln County. According to the FAA's National Plan of Integrated Airport Systems for 2009–2013, it is a general aviation airport (it had previously been a reliever airport).

Although many U.S. airports use the same three-letter location identifier for the FAA and IATA, this airport is assigned IPJ by the FAA but has no designation from the IATA.

== Facilities and aircraft ==
Lincoln County Regional Airport covers an area of 453 acres (183 ha) at an elevation of 877 feet (267 m) above mean sea level. It has one runway designated 5/23 with an asphalt surface measuring 5,500 by 100 feet (1,676 x 30 m).

For the 12-month period ending June 6, 2008, the airport had 34,100 aircraft operations, an average of 93 per day: 97% general aviation and 3% military. At that time there were 71 aircraft based at this airport: 87% single-engine, 10% multi-engine and 3% helicopter.

== See also ==
- List of airports in North Carolina
