= Macon County Airport =

- IATA: none; ICAO: none; FAA LID: 1A5

Summary
- Airport type: Public
- Owner: Macon County Airport Authority
- Serves: Macon County, North Carolina
- Location: Franklin, North Carolina
- Elevation AMSL: 2,034 ft / 620 m
- Coordinates: 35°13′21″N 083°25′09″W

Map
- Location of airport in North Carolina / United States 1A5 (the United States)

Runways
Direction	Length		Surface
Direction	ft	m	Surface
7/25	5,000	1,524	Asphalt

Statistics (2023)
- Aircraft operations (year ending 7/27/2023): 13,650
- Based aircraft: 30
- Source: Federal Aviation Administration

Macon County Airport (FAA LID: 1A5) is a public use airport in Macon County, North Carolina, United States. Owned by the Macon County Airport Authority, it is located three nautical miles (6 km) northwest of central business district of Franklin, North Carolina, in the Iotla Valley of the Great Smoky Mountains. This airport is included in the National Plan of Integrated Airport Systems for 2017–2021, which categorized it as a general aviation facility.

== Facilities and aircraft ==
Macon County Airport covers an area of 110 acres (45 ha) at an elevation of 2,034 feet (620 m) above mean sea level. It has one runway designated 7/25 with an asphalt surface measuring 5,000 by 100 feet (1,524 x 30 m).

For the 12-month period ending July 27, 2023, the airport had 13,650 aircraft operations, an average of 37 per day: 94% general aviation, 4% air taxi, and 2% military.

In July 2023, there were 30 aircraft based at this airport: 24 single-engine, 5 multi-engine, and 1 helicopter.

== See also ==
- List of airports in North Carolina
