= Tri-County Airport (North Carolina) =

- IATA: none; ICAO: KASJ; FAA LID: ASJ

Summary
- Airport type: Public
- Owner: Tri-County Airport Authority
- Serves: Ahoskie, North Carolina
- Elevation AMSL: 67 ft (20 m)
- Coordinates: 36°17′51″N 077°10′15″W

Map
- Location of airport in North Carolina

Runways
Direction	Length		Surface
Direction	ft	m	Surface
1/19	4,501	1,372	Asphalt

Statistics (2021)
- Aircraft operations (year ending 5/30/2021): 13,100
- Based aircraft: 11
- Source: Federal Aviation Administration

Tri-County Airport (ICAO: KASJ, FAA LID: ASJ) is a public use airport in unincorporated Hertford County, North Carolina, United States, located 9 nautical miles (10 mi; 17 km) west of the central business district of Ahoskie. It is owned by the Tri-County Airport Authority. This airport is included in the National Plan of Integrated Airport Systems for 2011–2015, which categorized it as a general aviation facility.

Although most U.S. airports use the same three-letter location identifier for the FAA and IATA, this airport is assigned ASJ by the FAA but has no assignment from the IATA (which assigned ASJ to Amami Oshima Airport in Amami Ōshima, Japan). The airport's ICAO identifier is KASJ.

== Facilities and aircraft ==
Tri-County Airport covers an area of 250 acres (101 ha) at an elevation of 67 feet (20 m) above mean sea level. It has one runway designated 1/19 with an asphalt surface measuring 4,501 by 75 feet (1,372 x 23 m).

For the 12-month period ending May 30, 2021, the airport had 13,100 aircraft operations, an average of 36 per day: 98% general aviation, 2% air taxi, and <1% military. At that time there were 11 aircraft based at this airport: 11 single-engine.

== See also ==
- List of airports in North Carolina
