= Sugar Valley Airport =

- IATA: none; ICAO: none; FAA LID: 5NC2

Summary
- Airport type: Private
- Owner: Human Service Alliance, Inc.
- Serves: Mocksville, North Carolina
- Elevation AMSL: 731 ft / 223 m
- Coordinates: 35°59′06″N 080°30′41″W

Map
- Location of airport in North Carolina

Runways
Direction	Length		Surface
Direction	ft	m	Surface
2/20	2,424	739	Asphalt
2W/20W

Statistics (2016)
- Based aircraft: 7
- Source: Federal Aviation Administration

Sugar Valley Airport (FAA LID: 5NC2) is a privately owned, private use airport in Davie County, North Carolina, United States. It is located six nautical miles (11 km) northeast of the central business district of Mocksville, North Carolina.

== Facilities and aircraft ==
Sugar Valley Airport covers an area of 70 acres (28 ha) at an elevation of 731 feet (223 m) above mean sea level. It has one asphalt paved runway designated 2/20 which measures 2,424 by 36 feet (739 x 12 m).

== See also ==
- List of airports in North Carolina
