= Raleigh Executive Jetport =

Raleigh Exec
- IATA: none; ICAO: KTTA; FAA LID: TTA

Summary
- Airport type: Public
- Owner: Sanford-Lee County Regional Airport Authority
- Serves: Research Triangle Region
- Location: Sanford, North Carolina
- Elevation AMSL: 246 ft (75 m)
- Coordinates: 35°34′57″N 079°06′05″W
- Website: RaleighExec.com

Map
- Location of airport in North Carolina

Runways
Direction	Length		Surface
Direction	ft	m	Surface
3/21	6,501	1,982	Asphalt

Statistics (2026)
- Aircraft operations: 96,000
- Based aircraft: 258
- Source: Federal Aviation Administration

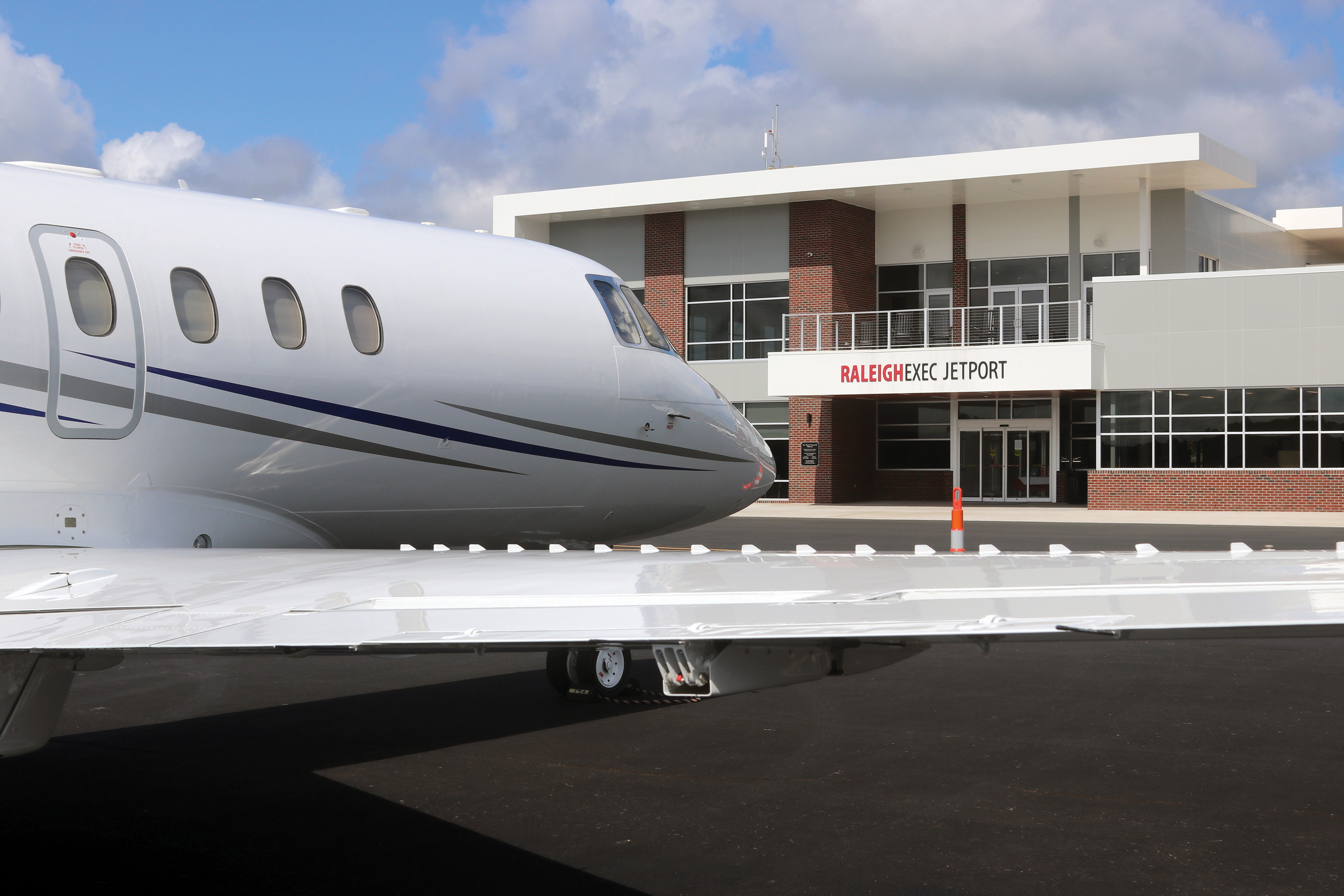
A corporate jet outside the terminal at Raleigh Exec, the premier gateway to Raleigh and North Carolina's Research Triangle region for corporate flights and recreational aviation.

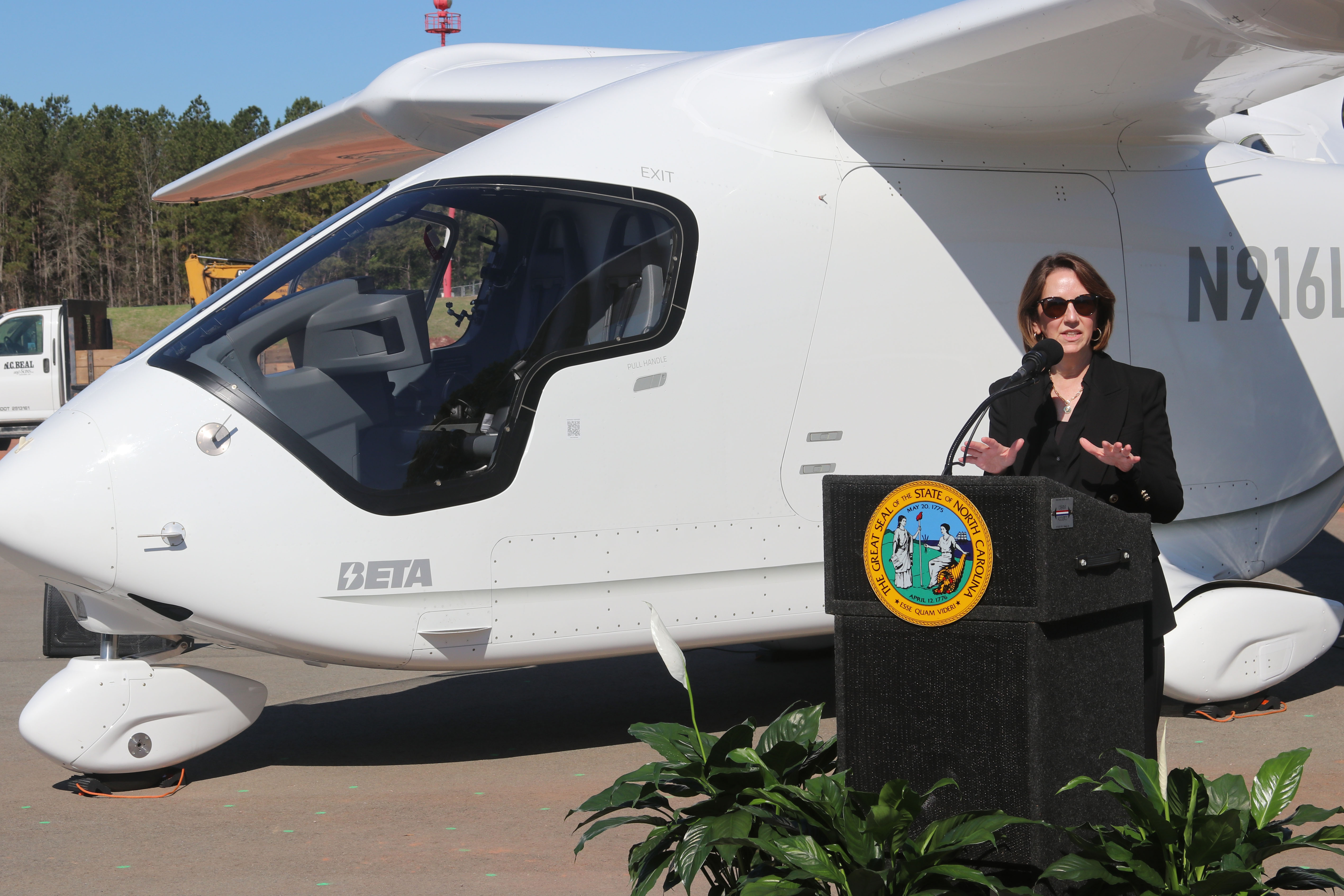
Julie White from the North Carolina Department of Transportation celebrated the future of aviation at Raleigh Exec when the state’s first electric aircraft charging station was used to power an electric aircraft for the first time.

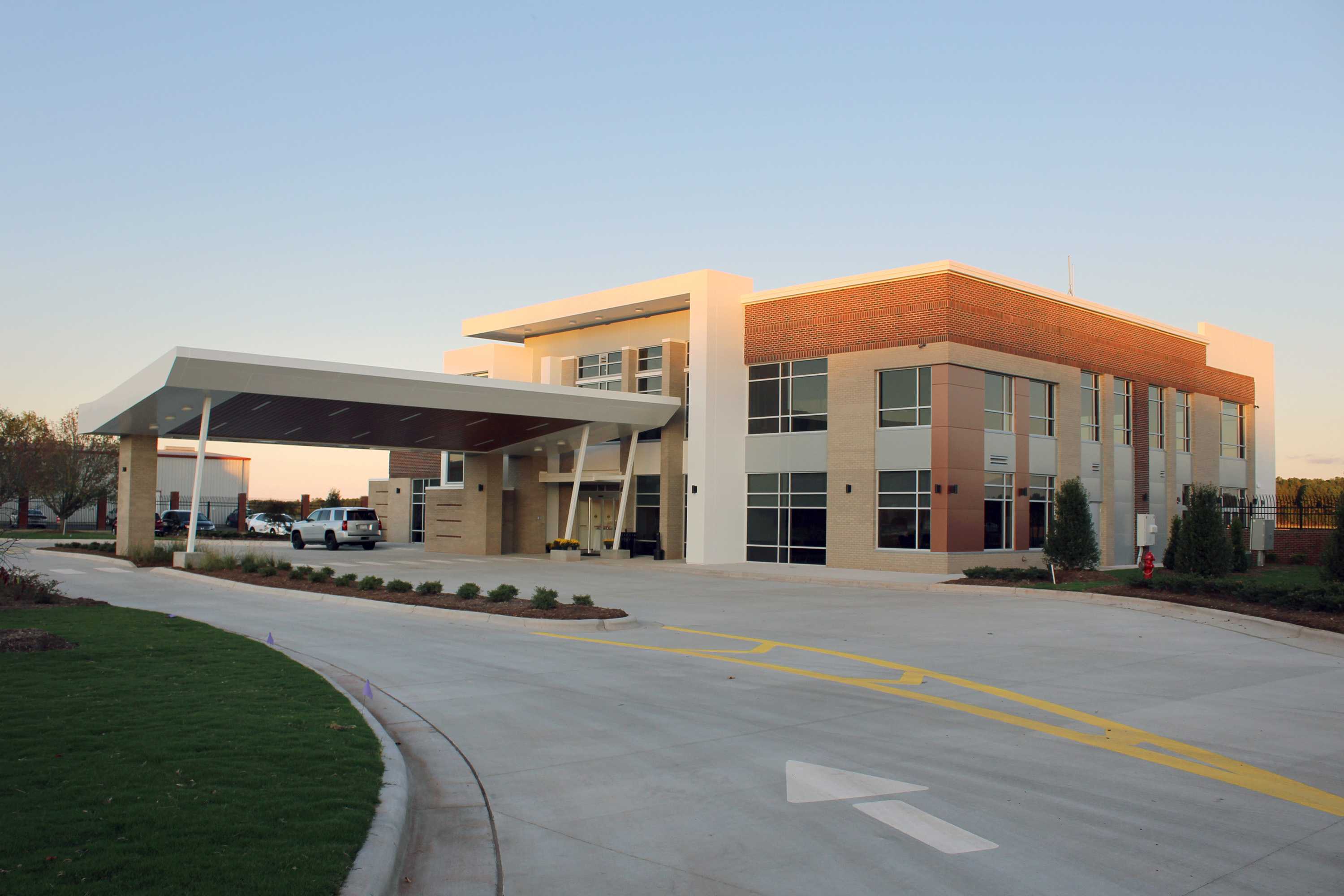
The O. A. "Buddy" Keller III Terminal at Raleigh Exec, a two-story, 14,500-square-foot facility, opened in October 2019 with corporate meeting rooms, fully equipped pilot's lounge and an observation deck overlooking the field.

Raleigh Exec: The Raleigh Executive Jetport (ICAO: KTTA, FAA LID: TTA) is a public use airport located seven nautical miles (8 mi, 13 km) northeast of the central business district of Sanford, a city in Lee County, North Carolina, United States. It is owned by the Sanford-Lee County Regional Airport Authority and was previously known as Sanford-Lee County Regional Airport. This general aviation airport is included in the National Plan of Integrated Airport Systems for 2011–2015, which categorized it as a reliever airport for Raleigh-Durham International Airport. It also is home to the state's first electric aircraft charging station.

The jetport specializes in corporate and recreational flights into the Research Triangle Region — an area that includes Raleigh, Cary, Chapel Hill, Durham and the Research Triangle Park. It hosts community-oriented special events, including Family Day @ the Jetport, the Triangle region's free annual aviation festival. Other community events include free quarterly airport tours, free flights for children as part of the EAA Young Eagles initiative, and visits from historical aircraft like the Memphis Belle and World War II warbirds.

Raleigh Exec offers full services, including Jet A and 100LL aircraft fuel, complete aircraft maintenance, avionics repair, pilot weather services, flight schools, secure hangars with limited-access gates, car service, courtesy and rental automobiles, and catering.

Although most U.S. airports use the same three-letter location identifier for the FAA and IATA, this airport is assigned TTA by the FAA but has no designation from the IATA, which has assigned TTA to Plage Blanche Airport in Tan-Tan, Morocco. The airport's ICAO identifier is KTTA.

== Facilities and aircraft ==
Raleigh Exec covers an area of 1,250 acres (506 ha) at an elevation of 246 feet (75 m) above mean sea level. It has one asphalt paved runway, designated 3/21, which is 6,501 by 100 feet (1,981 x 30 m) with a dual-wheel weight capacity of 102,000 pounds, and a parallel taxiway, 50 feet wide also with a dual-wheel weight capacity of 102,000 pounds. Ground traffic will soon will be managed from an air traffic control tower on the airport grounds that was approved by the FAA in 2025 and is currently scheduled to open in 2029.

The facility has full lighting, signage and safety equipment, including an automated weather observation system (AWOS), instrument landing system (ILS), ground communicator outlet (GCO) and automatic dependent surveillance-broadcast system (ADS-B). Because the ADS-B is located on the airport grounds, pilots can monitor both ground and air traffic.

The O.A. "Buddy" Keller III Terminal is the business and social center of the jetport. The two-story, 14,500-square-foot (1,350 m^{2}) building includes a pilot lounge with "snooze rooms" and a live video feed of the ramp; one large conference room, a technology-enriched meeting space accommodating 30 people with 16 seated around the table; one small conference room; one classroom for 20 people; another technology-enriched meeting space with seating for eight around the table; and a second-floor observation deck with rocking chairs overlooking the runway. One portion of the terminal was renovated in 2025 to create additional office space for businesses operating at the jetport.

For the 12-month period ending July 2026, the airport had 96,000 aircraft operations, an average of 263 per day: 95% general aviation, 3% air taxi, and 2% military. There were 258 aircraft based at the jetport.

== Businesses at Raleigh Exec ==
Many companies operate at Raleigh Exec. They include:

- AeroServices: avionics support to single engine piston, turbo-prop and jet business aircraft — including experimental, Warbird and light sport markets.
- ARQ Aviation: flight training for pilots of all experience levels in a certified Cirrus Authorized Training Center.
- ATP Flight School: Airline Career Pilot Program giving aviation students professional commercial pilot flight training and an airline-sponsored career track from zero experience to 1,500 hours.
- Bullseye Flight Team: aerial tributes in vintage military aircraft at major sporting events, military ceremonies, community gatherings and corporate activities to preserve the military Warbird heritage and enhance important civic events.
- Elite Aircraft Services: aviation services, including consulting on aircraft acquisition, aircraft management and maintenance, and customized pilot training.

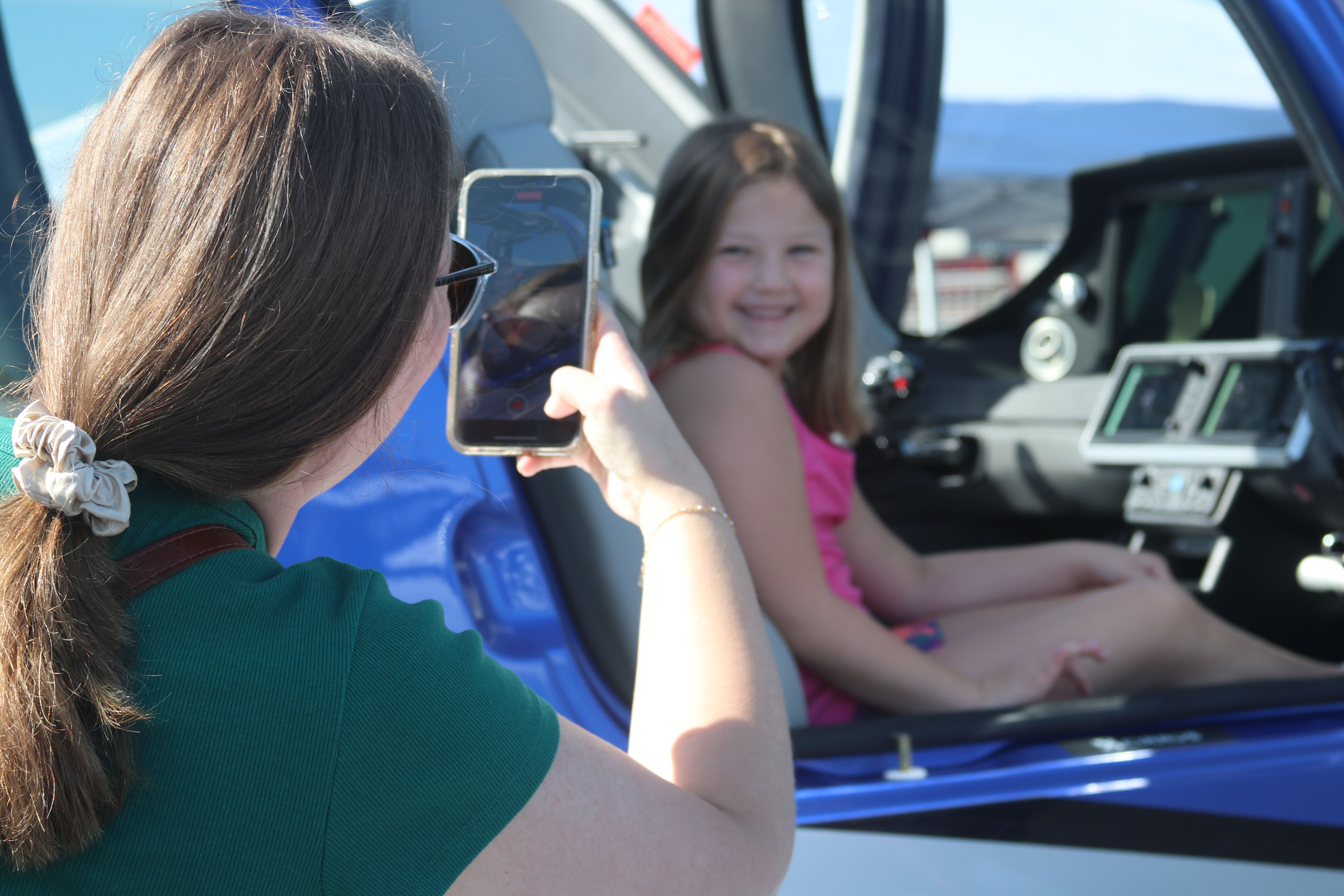
Guests enjoy Family Day 2025, a free, community celebration held every year at Raleigh Exec on the first Saturday of October. The event features displays of corporate jets, vintage airplanes, recreational aircraft; airport tours; question-and-answer sessions with aviation professionals; and demonstrations.

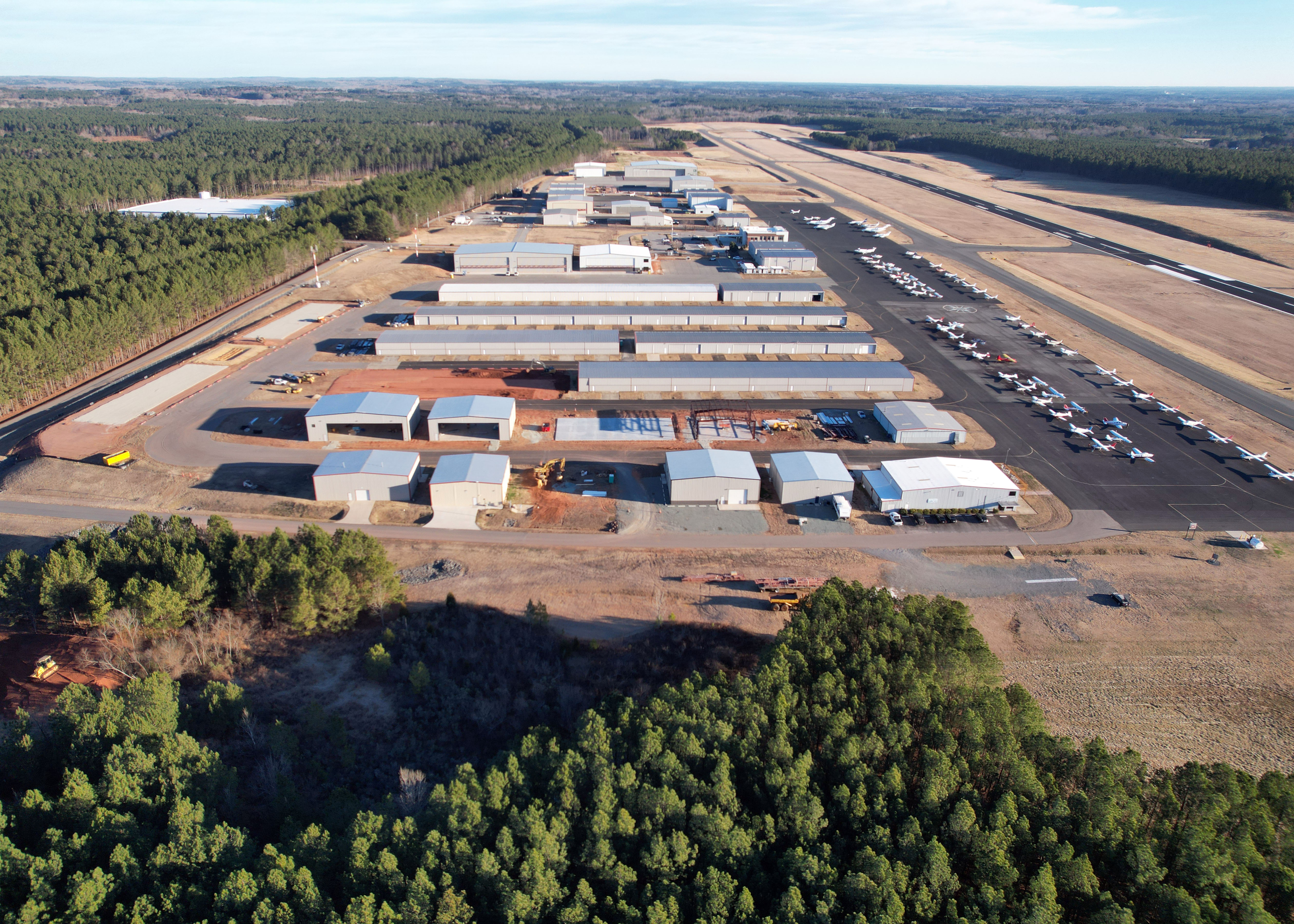
An aerial photo of Raleigh Exec, taken by Bobbitt commercial contractors in the winter of 2026 during one of the jetport's recent expansion projects.

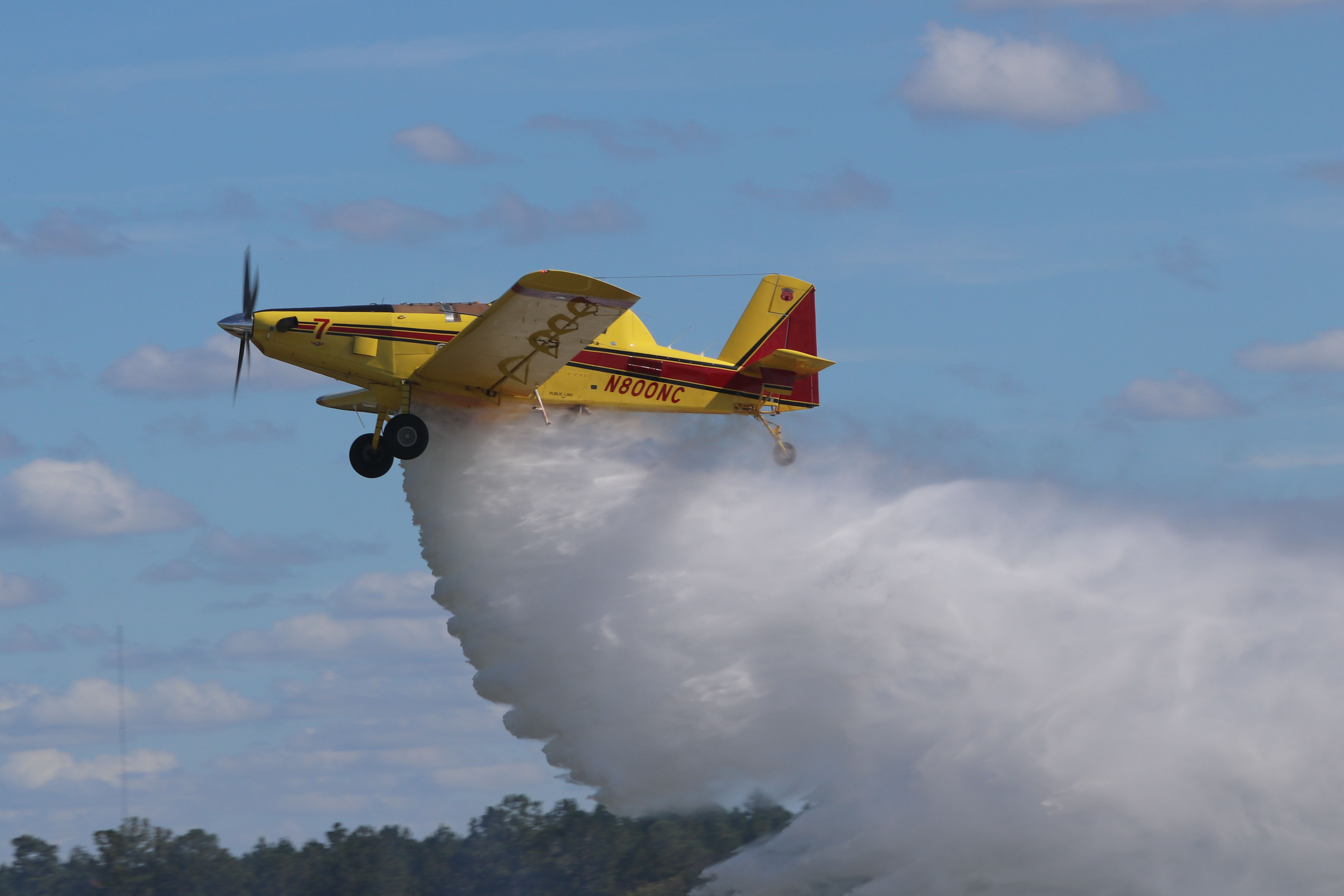
The North Carolina Forest Service presents an aerial firefighting demonstration at Family Day 2025, a free, community celebration held every year at Raleigh Exec on the first Saturday of October. The event features displays of corporate jets, vintage airplanes, recreational aircraft; airport tours; question-and-answer sessions with aviation professionals; and demonstrations.

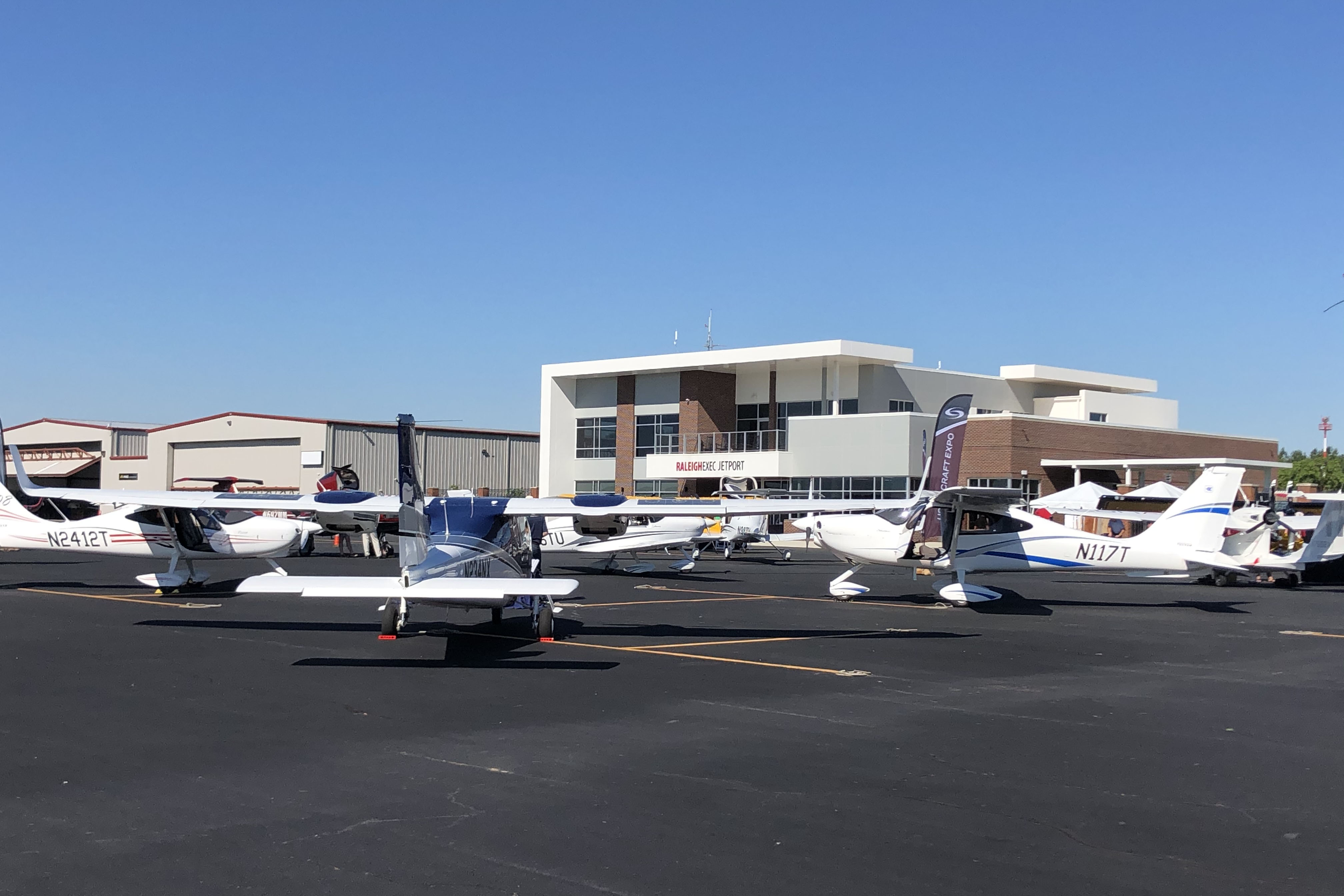
Raleigh Exec terminal, viewed from the field during the U.S. Aircraft Expo on June 26–27, 2020.

- Executive Flight Training: flight training using Piper Cherokee, Piper Warrior, and Cessna 172 aircraft.
- Jet Excellence: charter flights to meet current demand for safe, efficient and flexible private travel.
- MAG Aerospace: maintenance as well as avionics repair, installation and maintenance for single-piston through twin-turboprop aircraft.
- North Carolina Forest Service: regional aviation firefighting operations from a facility serving as an operational base for five fixed-wing aircraft and two helicopters used to fight forest fires and a centralized maintenance location for the entire state.
- Odyssey Aero Club: checkout for members in FAA Technically Advanced Aircraft, including VFR and IFR checkouts, instrument training and commercial training.
- Total Aircraft Solutions: inspections, repairs and alterations with specialties in breakdown and retrieval services and in insurance claims and restorations.
- Wings of Carolina Flying Club: one of the oldest flying clubs in the nation. Founded in 1961, the nonprofit has more than 600 members from the Research Triangle, Southern Pines and Fayetteville areas. It offers aeronautical training, low-cost aviation education, social opportunities and inexpensive hourly aircraft rental for members.

== Recent and future improvements ==
Several significant expansions and improvements have concluded over the last decade — including the addition of 550 acres in 2024 and widening of the taxiway to 50 feet with a weight capacity of 100,000 pounds. In 2018, Raleigh Exec expanded its North Terminal area, adding sites for seven new corporate hangars 15,000 square feet or larger — each site with water and sewer service, fiber internet service, adjacent rail service, a public fire suppression system, a large apron and a new taxiway connector. The second phase of development in the North Terminal area is now underway with more large corporate hangars.

The O.A. "Buddy" Keller III Terminal, a two-story, 14,500-square-foot terminal, opened in 2019 with expanded office space added in 2025 for business operating at the jetport. A new bypass-taxiway opened in 2025; with that improved access, one section of the airport just south of the terminal is being developed further with 27 additional aircraft hangars and a 1,500-square-foot maintenance facility. Raleigh Exec also has been approved by the FAA for an air traffic control tower to manage traffic from the airport grounds, a project that is now in the design phase and scheduled to open in 2029.

One of the more notable expansions was the addition of North Carolina's first electric aircraft charger, opened in partnership with BETA Technologies in 2025. At the time of its dedication, the location that includes a small campus of environmentally-sustainable container buildings, was part of BETA's nationwide charging network with about 50 sites across the East, West and Gulf coasts.

== Economic impact ==
Raleigh Exec contributed about $104.2 million to the local economy, according to a 2025 biannual report published by the North Carolina Division of Aviation that based its findings on data from 2023, the most recent year of complete data available at the time of the study. Researchers estimated that the jetport generated $42.89 million per year in personal income and $4.996 million in state and local taxes. The airport was credited with creating about 530 jobs, including those located on the jetport grounds and others supported by activity taking place at the jetport.

== See also ==
- List of airports in North Carolina
