= Anson County Airport =

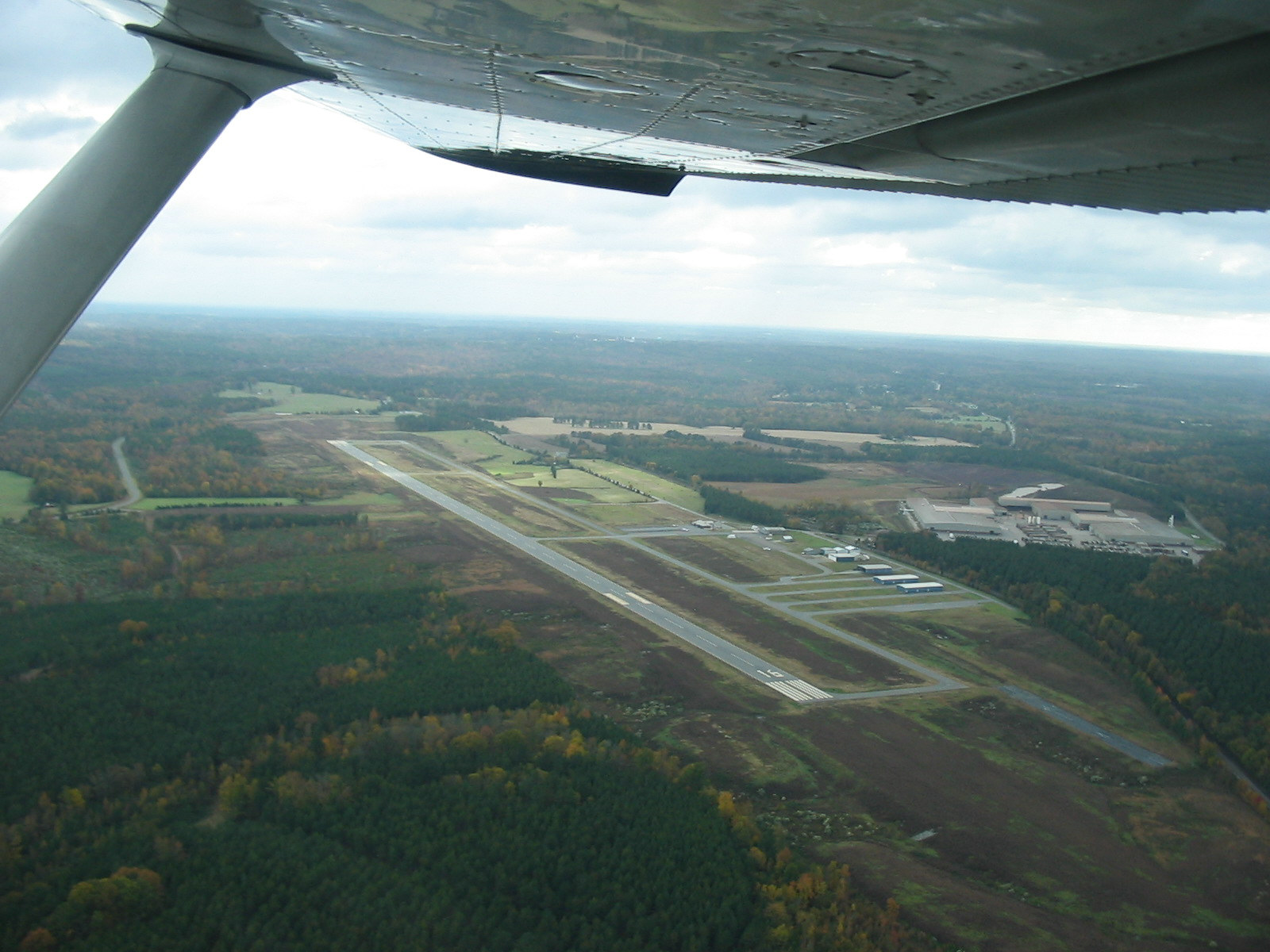
- IATA: none; ICAO: KAFP; FAA LID: AFP

Summary
- Airport type: Public
- Owner: Anson County
- Location: Wadesboro, North Carolina
- Elevation AMSL: 300 ft (91 m)
- Coordinates: 35°01′14″N 080°04′38″W
- Interactive map of Anson County Airport

Runways
Direction	Length		Surface
Direction	ft	m	Surface
16/34	5,498	1,676	Asphalt

Statistics (2023)
- Aircraft operations (year ending 5/29/2023): 6,515
- Based aircraft: 26
- Source: Federal Aviation Administration

Anson County Airport (ICAO: KAFP, FAA LID: AFP) is a public airport located three miles (5 km) north of the central business district of Wadesboro, a town in Anson County, North Carolina, United States. It is owned by Anson County.

Although most U.S. airports use the same three-letter location identifier for the FAA and IATA, Anson County Airport is assigned AFP by the FAA but has no designation from the IATA.

== Facilities and aircraft ==
Anson County Airport covers an area of 433 acres (175 ha) which contains one asphalt paved runway (16/34) measuring 5,498 x 100 ft (1,676 x 30 m).

For the 12-month period ending May 29, 2023, the airport had 6,515 aircraft operations, an average of 125 per week: 99% general aviation, and <1% military. There was at that time 26 aircraft based at this airport: 21 single engine, and 5 helicopter.

== History ==
The Anson County Airport was originally equipped with a runway only 3,464 ft (1,056 m). long. In 2006, a new 5,500 ft (1,700 m). runway was completed, in addition to a new 2,400 sq ft (220 m^{2}). terminal building and several new hangars. Future plans for the airport include the addition of a new Instrument Landing System.

== See also ==
- List of airports in North Carolina
