= Duplin County Airport =

- IATA: none; ICAO: KDPL; FAA LID: DPL

Summary
- Airport type: Public
- Owner: Duplin County
- Serves: Kenansville, North Carolina
- Elevation AMSL: 137 ft (42 m)
- Coordinates: 35°00′00″N 077°58′54″W

Map
- Location of airport in North Carolina

Runways
Direction	Length		Surface
Direction	ft	m	Surface
5/23	6,002	1,829	Asphalt

Statistics (2011)
- Aircraft operations: 17,500
- Based aircraft: 21
- Source: Federal Aviation Administration

Duplin County Airport (ICAO: KDPL, FAA LID: DPL) is a county-owned, public-use airport in Duplin County, North Carolina, United States. It is located two nautical miles (4 km) northwest of the central business district of Kenansville, North Carolina. This airport is included in the National Plan of Integrated Airport Systems for 2011–2015, which categorized it as a general aviation facility.

Although most U.S. airports use the same three-letter location identifier for the FAA and IATA, this airport is assigned DPL by the FAA but has no designation from the IATA (which assigned DPL to Dipolog Airport in Dipolog, Philippines).

== History ==
Duplin County Airport opened December 16, 1964 when a University of North Carolina Medical School airplane landed on the runway.

== Facilities and aircraft ==
Duplin County Airport covers an area of 435 acres (176 ha) at an elevation of 137 feet (42 m) above mean sea level. It has one runway designated 5/23 with an asphalt surface measuring 6,002 by 75 feet (1,829 x 23 m).

For the 12-month period ending August 25, 2011, the airport had 17,500 aircraft operations, an average of 47 per day: 2% general aviation and 98% military. MCAS New River uses the airport as an OLF. At that time there were 21 aircraft based at this airport: 67% single-engine, 19% jet, 9% multi-engine, and 5% helicopter.

== See also ==
- List of airports in North Carolina
