= Oxford Airport (Massachusetts) =

- IATA: none; ICAO: none

Summary
- Operator: Private
- Location: Oxford, Massachusetts
- Built: Unknown
- In use: 1966-Early 2000s
- Occupants: Private/Public
- Elevation AMSL: 762 ft / 232 m
- Coordinates: 42°9′5.81″N 71°50′7.06″W
- Interactive map of Oxford Airport

Oxford Airport was an airfield operational in from 1966 to before 2005 in Oxford, Massachusetts.
