= Wilson's Airport =

- IATA: none; ICAO: none; FAA LID: E40

Summary
- Airport type: Public use
- Owner: Wilson's Estate
- Serves: Hickory, North Carolina
- Elevation AMSL: 985 ft / 300 m
- Coordinates: 35°39′07″N 081°21′28″W
- Interactive map of Wilson's Airport

Runways
Direction	Length		Surface
Direction	ft	m	Surface
17/35	2,175	663	Turf

Statistics (2021)
- Aircraft operations (year ending 3/27/2021): 800
- Based aircraft: 9
- Source: Federal Aviation Administration

Wilson's Airport (FAA LID: E40) is a privately owned, public use airport located four nautical miles (5 mi, 7 km) south of the central business district of Hickory, a city in Catawba County, North Carolina, United States.

== Facilities and aircraft ==
Wilson's Airport covers an area of 27 acres (11 ha) at an elevation of 985 feet (300 m) above mean sea level. It has one runway designated 17/35 with a turf surface measuring 2,175 by 70 feet (663 × 21 m).

For the 12-month period ending March 27, 2021, the airport had 800 aircraft operations, an average of 67 per month: 93% general aviation and 6% military. At that time there were 9 aircraft based at this airport: 8 single-engine and 1 ultralight.

== See also ==
- List of airports in North Carolina
