= Triangle North Executive Airport =

Triangle North Executive Airport (Franklin County Airport)
- IATA: LFN; ICAO: KLHZ; FAA LID: LHZ

Summary
- Airport type: Public
- Owner: Franklin County
- Serves: Louisburg, North Carolina
- Elevation AMSL: 369 ft / 112 m
- Coordinates: 36°01′24″N 078°19′49″W
- Website: https://www.franklincountync.gov/county_services/airport/index.php
- Interactive map of Triangle North Executive Airport (Franklin County Airport)

Runways
Direction	Length		Surface
Direction	ft	m	Surface
5/23	5,498	1,676	Asphalt

Statistics (2008)
- Aircraft operations: 62,800
- Based aircraft: 65
- Source: Federal Aviation Administration

Triangle North Executive Airport (IATA: LFN, ICAO: KLHZ, FAA LID: LHZ) is a county-owned, public-use airport in Franklin County, North Carolina, United States. It is located five nautical miles (9 km) southwest of the central business district of Louisburg, North Carolina.

It was known as the Franklin County Regional Airport until November 2008, when the Board of Commissioners of Franklin County approved the new name. As of February 2010, Federal Aviation Administration records give the airport's name as Franklin County Airport.

Although most U.S. airports use the same three-letter location identifier for the FAA and IATA, this airport is assigned LHZ by the FAA and LFN by the IATA. The airport's ICAO identifier is KLHZ.

== Facilities and aircraft ==
The airport covers an area of 388 acres (157 ha) at an elevation of 369 feet (112 m) above mean sea level. It has one runway designated 5/23 with an asphalt surface measuring 5,498 by 100 feet (1,676 x 30 m).

For the 12-month period ending July 1, 2008, the airport had 62,800 aircraft operations, an average of 171 per day: 96% general aviation and 4% military. At that time there were 65 aircraft based at this airport: 83% single-engine, 6% multi-engine, 2% jet and 9% helicopter.

== See also ==
- List of airports in North Carolina
