= Pine Island Airport =

- IATA: DUF; ICAO: 7NC2

Summary
- Airport type: Private
- Owner: Turnpike Properties
- Operator: Outer Banks Airlines
- Serves: Corolla, North Carolina
- Location: Corolla, North Carolina, just east of Currituck Sound
- Elevation AMSL: 16 ft / 5 m
- Coordinates: 036°15′12″N 075°47′19″W
- Interactive map of Pine Island Airport

Runways
Direction	Length		Surface
Direction	ft	m	Surface
17/35	3,450	1,052	Asphalt

Pine Island Airport (IATA: DUF) is a privately owned airport, located in the town of Corolla, North Carolina, owned by Turnpike Properties. The FAA ID is 7NC2 and IATA code DUF. The airport has one 3,450 ft. runway, designated runway 17/35. As of March 10, 2017, the airport is operational with restrictions Airstrip is for private use only. Contact Airport Manager, Atlantic Realty of the Outer Banks for use Overnight parking is not permitted.

== See also ==
- List of airports in North Carolina
