= Rutherford County Airport =

Public airport in North Carolina

Rutherford County Airport Marchman Field
- IATA: none; ICAO: KFQD; FAA LID: FQD

Summary
- Airport type: Public
- Owner: Rutherford County Airport Authority
- Serves: Rutherfordton, North Carolina
- Location: Rutherford County, North Carolina
- Opened: 1975
- Coordinates: 35°25′41.6″N 81°56′6.28″W

Map
- Location of airport in North Carolina

Runways
| Direction | Length | | Surface |
| Direction | ft | m | Surface |
|---|---|---|---|
| 1/19 | 5,000 | 1,524 | Asphalt |

Rutherford County Airport (ICAO: KFQD, FAA LID: FQD), also known as Marchman Field, is a public-use general aviation airport serving Rutherford County, North Carolina, United States. The airport is located 3 miles (4.8 km) north of Rutherfordton.

== Facilities and operations ==
Rutherford County Airport offers one paved asphalt runway, designated 1/19. The runway measures 5,000 ft (1,524 m) in length and 100 ft (30 m) in width. The runway has a 100 ft drop-off at the 315 ft mark, and another 100 ft drop-off between the 700 ft and 900 ft points.

The airport is owned and operated by the Rutherford County Airport Authority. It has an average of 33 aircraft operations per day.

== History ==
The airport was opened in 1975. It is alternatively referred to as Marchman Field after James Franklin Marchman Jr. (1913–1993), a World War II veteran from Forest City.

== See also ==
- List of airports in North Carolina
