= Wilkes County Airport =

- IATA: IKB; ICAO: KUKF; FAA LID: UKF

Summary
- Airport type: Public
- Owner: Wilkes County
- Serves: North Wilkesboro, North Carolina
- Elevation AMSL: 1,301 ft / 397 m
- Coordinates: 36°13′22″N 081°05′54″W
- Interactive map of Wilkes County Airport

Runways
Direction	Length		Surface
Direction	ft	m	Surface
1/19	6,200	1,890	Asphalt

Wilkes County Airport (IATA: IKB, ICAO: KUKF, FAA LID: UKF) is a public airport located four miles (6 km) northeast of the central business district (CBD) of North Wilkesboro, a town in Wilkes County, North Carolina, USA. This general aviation airport covers 237 acres (96 ha) and has one runway.

Although most U.S. airports use the same three-letter location identifier for the FAA and IATA, Wilkes County Airport is assigned UKF by the FAA and IKB by the IATA. The airport's ICAO identifier is KUKF.

== History ==
Wilkes County Airport was the successor of two previous airfields in Wilkes County: the old Wilkes County Airport and North Wilkesboro Airport. The first airport in the county was North Wilkesboro which opened in the early 1900s. It had a grass runway going from East to West located where West Park Medical Park is today. The runway opened with a length of 1,500 feet and was extended in the 1960s to 2,300 feet. The airport also had a few hangars. Between 1962 and 1963, North Wilkesboro Airport was replaced by the old Wilkes County Airport located roughly 1.5 miles to the southwest. The newer airport had a longer and more durable 3,600 feet and paved runway. The runway ran northeast-southwest while the ramp was located south of the runway and had three buildings. In the 1980s, the runway was lengthened to 4,250 feet. Along with the runway lengthening, the ramp was expanded to include six buildings. In the late 1980s, the airport was shut down as it was replaced by the current airport, Wilkes County Airport.

== Operators ==
Samaritan's Purse has multiple executive aircraft based at the airport. These aircraft include Beechcraft King Air turboprops, Dassault Falcon Jets, a Gulfstream G550, and a Cessna 208 Caravan.

== See also ==
- List of airports in North Carolina
