= Bladenboro Airport =

- IATA: none; ICAO: none; FAA LID: 3W6

Summary
- Airport type: Public
- Owner/Operator: Reynold Hester
- Location: Bladenboro, North Carolina
- Opened: 1947
- Time zone: Eastern Standard Time (UTC-5)
  - Summer (DST): Eastern Daylight Time (UTC-4)
- Elevation AMSL: 116 ft (35 m)
- Coordinates: 34.5428611°N 78.7781667°W
- Interactive map of Bladenboro Airport

Runways
Direction	Length		Surface
Direction	ft	m	Surface
2/20	2,850	869	Turf

Bladenboro Airport (FAA LID: 3W6) is a public-use airport located in Bladenboro, North Carolina.

== Incidents ==
In 2015, two individuals attempted to take off from Bladenboro Airport in a 1995 Glasair airplane en route to Georgia. During takeoff, the plane ultimately crashed into a ditch beside the airport, with the two occupants only suffering minor injuries.
