= Lumberton Municipal Airport =

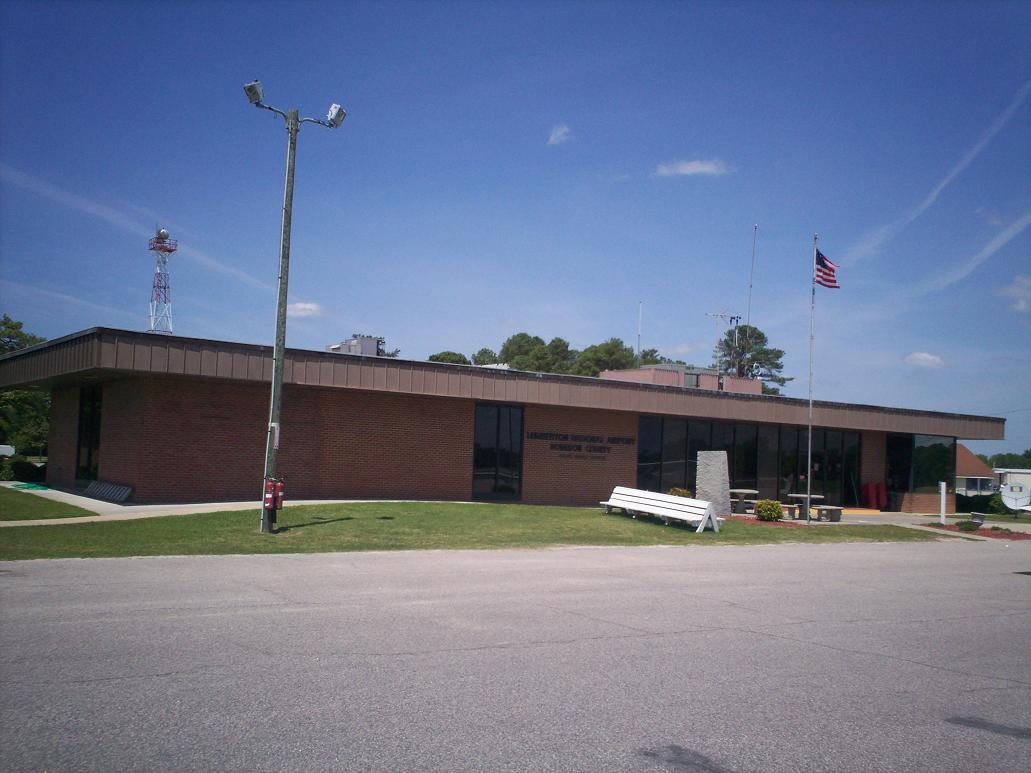
- Former terminal building in 2009
- IATA: LBT; ICAO: KLBT; FAA LID: LBT

Summary
- Airport type: Public
- Owner: City of Lumberton
- Serves: Lumberton, North Carolina
- Elevation AMSL: 125 ft / 38 m
- Coordinates: 34°36′35″N 079°03′34″W
- Website: Lumberton Municipal Airport

Map
- Location of airport in North Carolina

Runways
Direction	Length		Surface
Direction	ft	m	Surface
5/23	5,502	1,677	Asphalt
13/31	5,003	1,525	Asphalt

Statistics (2011)
- Aircraft operations: 25,000
- Based aircraft: 46
- Source: FAA Airport website

Lumberton Municipal Airport (IATA: LBT, ICAO: KLBT, FAA LID: LBT) is a city-owned, public-use airport located three nautical miles (6 km) west of the central business district of Lumberton, a city in Robeson County, North Carolina, United States. It is included in the National Plan of Integrated Airport Systems for 2011–2015, which categorized it as a general aviation facility.

== Facilities and aircraft ==
Lumberton Municipal Airport covers an area of 485 acres (196 ha) at an elevation of 125 feet (38 m) above mean sea level. It has two runways with asphalt surfaces: 5/23 is 5,502 by 150 feet (1,677 x 46 m) and 13/31 is 5,003 by 150 feet (1,525 x 46 m).

For the 12-month period ending May 18, 2011, the airport had 25,000 aircraft operations, an average of 68 per day: 88% general aviation, 8% military, and 4% air taxi. At that time there were 46 aircraft based at this airport: 85% single-engine, 6.5% multi-engine, 6.5% ultralight, and 2% helicopter.

== See also ==
- List of airports in North Carolina
