= Davidson County Airport =

Davidson County Executive Airport
- IATA: none; ICAO: KEXX; FAA LID: EXX

Summary
- Airport type: Public
- Owner: Davidson County Airport Authority
- Serves: Lexington, North Carolina
- Elevation AMSL: 733 ft (223 m)
- Coordinates: 35°46′52″N 080°18′14″W

Map
- Location of airport in North Carolina

Runways
Direction	Length		Surface
Direction	ft	m	Surface
6/24	5,004	1,525	Asphalt

Statistics (2012)
- Aircraft operations: 9,000
- Based aircraft: 66
- Source: Federal Aviation Administration

Davidson County Executive Airport (ICAO: KEXX, FAA LID: EXX) is a public use airport in Davidson County, North Carolina, United States. It is owned by the Davidson County Airport Authority and located three nautical miles (6 km) southwest of the central business district of Lexington, North Carolina. It is included in the National Plan of Integrated Airport Systems for 2011–2015, which categorized it as a general aviation facility.

Although most U.S. airports use the same three-letter location identifier for the FAA and IATA, this airport is assigned EXX by the FAA, but has no designation from the IATA.

== Facilities and aircraft ==
Davidson County Executive Airport covers an area of 330 acres (133 ha) at an elevation of 733 feet (223 m) above mean sea level. It has one runway designated 6/24 with an asphalt surface measuring 5,004 by 100 feet (1,525 x 30 m).

For the 12-month period ending April 30, 2015, the airport had 19,000 aircraft operations, an average of 52 per day: 89% general aviation, 6% air taxi, and 6% military. At that time there were 75 aircraft based at this airport: 66% single-engine, 20% multi-engine, 8% jet, and 6% helicopter.

The Davidson County Executive Airport offers complete aircraft maintenance from the onfield maintenance provider, https://skyaviationholdings.com/aircraft-maintenance/.

== Incidents ==
On October 23, 2011, a Cozy MK IV aircraft crashed on approach to the airport, resulting in the death of the pilot and an injury to the passenger.

On June 25, 2018, a Stearman Biplane flipped on landing coming to rest upside down on the runway, resulting in minor injuries to both the pilot and a child passenger.

== See also ==
- List of airports in North Carolina
