= Henderson Field (North Carolina) =

Wallace–Pender Airport
- IATA: none; ICAO: KACZ; FAA LID: ACZ

Summary
- Airport type: Public
- Owner: Town of Wallace
- Serves: Wallace, North Carolina
- Elevation AMSL: 38 ft (12 m)
- Coordinates: 34°43′04″N 78°00′13″W
- Interactive map of Wallace–Pender Airport

Runways
Direction	Length		Surface
Direction	ft	m	Surface
9/27	4,153	1,266	Asphalt

Wallace–Pender Airport (ICAO: KACZ, FAA LID: ACZ), also known as Henderson Field, is a public airfield located one mile (2 km) southwest of the central business district (CBD) of Wallace, a town in Duplin County and Pender County, North Carolina, USA. This general aviation airport covers 145 acres (59 ha) and has one runway.

Although most U.S. airports use the same three-letter location identifier for the FAA and IATA, Wallace–Pender Airport Airport is assigned ACZ by the FAA but has no designation from the IATA (which assigned ACZ to Zabol, Iran). The airport's ICAO identifier is KACZ.

In 2023, former airport manager Gage King announced to Pender County Commissioners plans for the airport to receive $18.4 million in funding from state and federal sources over the next three years. The project, part of the NCDOT’s 2020-2029 Strategic Transportation Improvement Program, aims to expand the runway by 1,347 feet, reaching a total of 5,500 feet, allowing larger business jets to use the facility.

King also announced that by July 2024 he anticipates the runway extension and taxiway construction to begin, costing $8.8 million. The airport’s apron will also expand by around 30%, improving functionality for larger aircraft. King plans future projects, totaling $16 million, to enhance the airport further, funding some through grants.

While formally owned by the Town of Wallace, Pender County is involved in decision-making due to the airport's benefit to the county. King aims to create a more welcoming environment at the airport and plans to rename it for better marketability.

== See also ==
- List of airports in North Carolina
