= Twin Lakes Airport (North Carolina) =

- IATA: none; ICAO: none; FAA LID: 8A7

Summary
- Airport type: Public
- Owner: Dr. Phillip Martin
- Serves: Mocksville, North Carolina
- Elevation AMSL: 818 ft / 249 m
- Coordinates: 35°54′54″N 080°27′25″W
- Interactive map of Twin Lakes Airport

Runways
Direction	Length		Surface
Direction	ft	m	Surface
9/27	2,943	897	Asphalt

Statistics (2022)
- Aircraft operations (year ending 7/8/2022): 30,000
- Based aircraft: 90
- Source: Federal Aviation Administration

Twin Lakes Airport (FAA LID: 8A7) is a privately owned, public-use airport located five miles (8 km) northeast of the central business district of Mocksville, in Davie County, North Carolina, United States.

== Facilities and aircraft ==
Twin Lakes Airport covers an area of 100 acres (40 ha) and has one runway designated 9/27 with a 2,943 x 50 ft (897 x 15 m) asphalt surface.

For the 12-month period ending July 8, 2022, the airport had 30,000 aircraft operations, an average of 82 per day: 97% general aviation and 3% military. At that time there were 90 aircraft based at this airport: 88 single-engine, and 2 multi-engine.

== See also ==
- List of airports in North Carolina
