= First Flight Airport =

Public use airport in North Carolina, U.S.

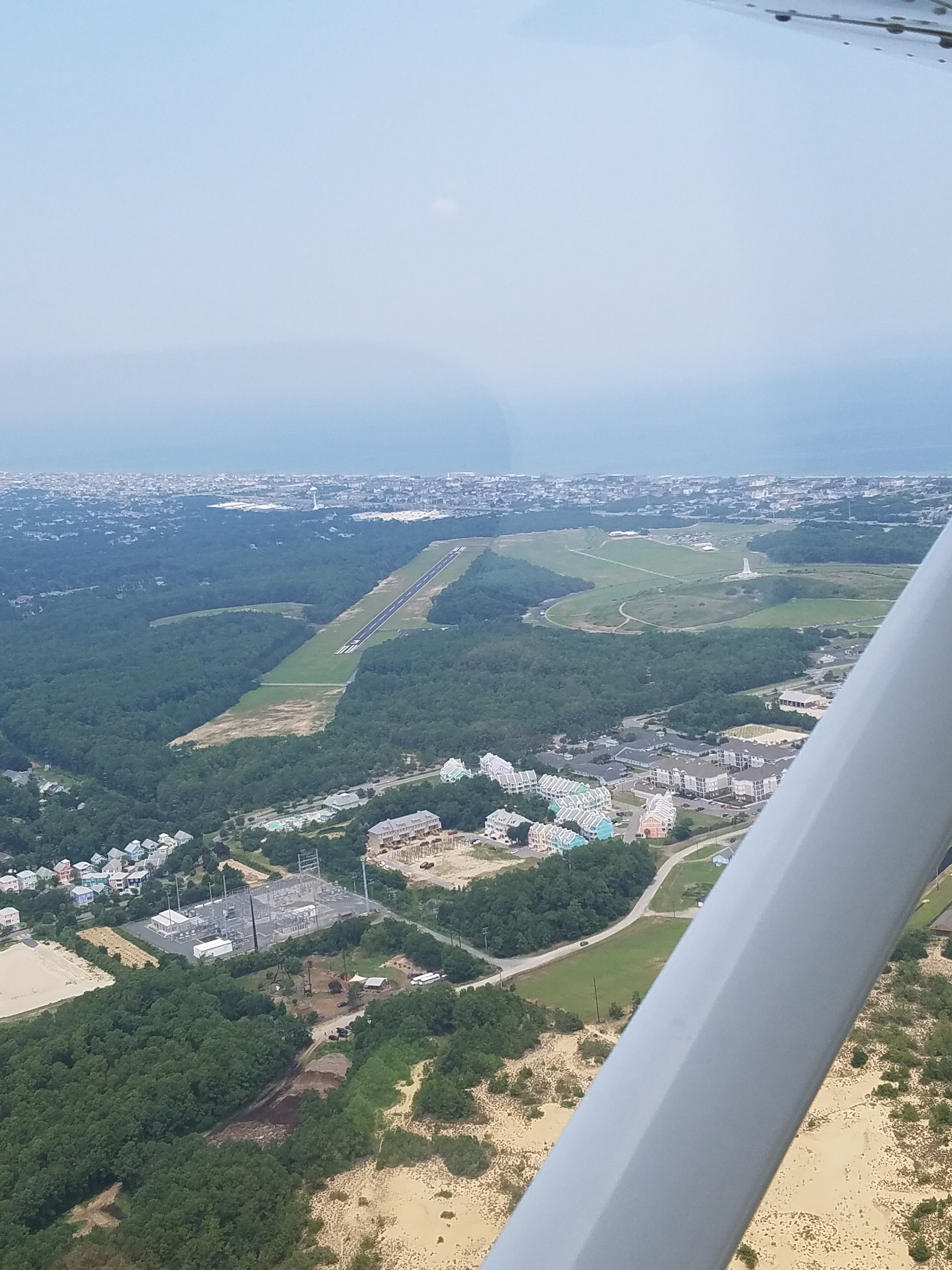
- First Flight Airport from 1,000 feet (305 meters)
- IATA: FFA; ICAO: KFFA; FAA LID: FFA

Summary
- Airport type: Public
- Owner: U.S. National Park Service
- Serves: Kill Devil Hills, North Carolina
- Location: Wright Brothers National Memorial
- Elevation AMSL: 13 ft / 4 m
- Coordinates: 36°01′06″N 075°40′17″W
- Website: www.nps.gov/places/000/first-flight-airstrip.htm

Map
- Interactive map of First Flight Airport

Runways
Direction	Length		Surface
Direction	ft	m	Surface
03/21	3,000	914	Asphalt

Statistics (2018)
- Aircraft operations: 37,500
- Source: Federal Aviation Administration

First Flight Airport (IATA: FFA, ICAO: KFFA, FAA LID: FFA) is a public-use airport located one nautical mile (1.9 km; 1.2 mi) west of the central business district of Kill Devil Hills, a town in Dare County, North Carolina, United States. The airport is owned by the U.S. National Park Service. It was included in the National Plan of Integrated Airport Systems for 2011–2015, which categorized it as a general aviation facility.

The airport itself is famous for being the site of hundreds of pre-flight gliding experiments carried out by the Wright brothers. The Wright Brothers National Memorial, located atop nearby Kill Devil Hill, is a 60-foot (18-meter) granite pylon paying homage to the Wright Brothers and the first sustained heavier-than-air flight. The U.S. Centennial of Flight Commission also chose the airport as one of the stops for the National Air Tour 2003.

== History ==
On December 17, 1903, the first successful powered heavier-than-air aircraft flight occurred here, conducted by the Wright brothers.

== Facilities and aircraft ==
First Flight Airport covers an area of 40 acres (16 ha) at an elevation of 13 feet (4 m) above mean sea level. It has one runway designated 3/21 with an asphalt surface measuring 3,000 by 60 feet (914 by 18 m). For the 12-month period ending April 18, 2018, the airport had 37,500 aircraft operations, an average of about 103 per day: 99% general aviation and 1% military.

== See also ==
- List of airports in North Carolina
