= Sky Manor Airport (North Carolina) =

- IATA: none; ICAO: none; FAA LID: N22

Summary
- Airport type: Public use
- Owner: A.V. Jones
- Serves: Jacksonville, North Carolina
- Elevation AMSL: 60 ft / 18 m
- Coordinates: 34°43′01″N 077°35′32″W

Map
- Location of airport in North Carolina

Runways
Direction	Length		Surface
Direction	ft	m	Surface
8/26	3,610	1,100	Turf

Statistics (2022)
- Aircraft operations (year ending 6/2/2022): 600
- Based aircraft: 1
- Source: Federal Aviation Administration

Sky Manor Airport (FAA LID: N22) is a privately owned, public use airport located eight nautical miles (9 mi, 15 km) west of the central business district of Jacksonville, a city in Onslow County, North Carolina, United States.

== Facilities and aircraft ==
Sky Manor Airport covers an area of 25 acres (10 ha) at an elevation of 60 feet (18 m) above mean sea level. It has one runway designated 8/26 with a turf surface measuring 3,610 by 85 feet (1,100 x 26 m).

For the 12-month period ending June 2, 2022, the airport had 600 general aviation aircraft operations, an average of 50 per month. At that time there was one single-engine aircraft based at this airport.

== See also ==
- List of airports in North Carolina
