= Dare County Regional Airport =

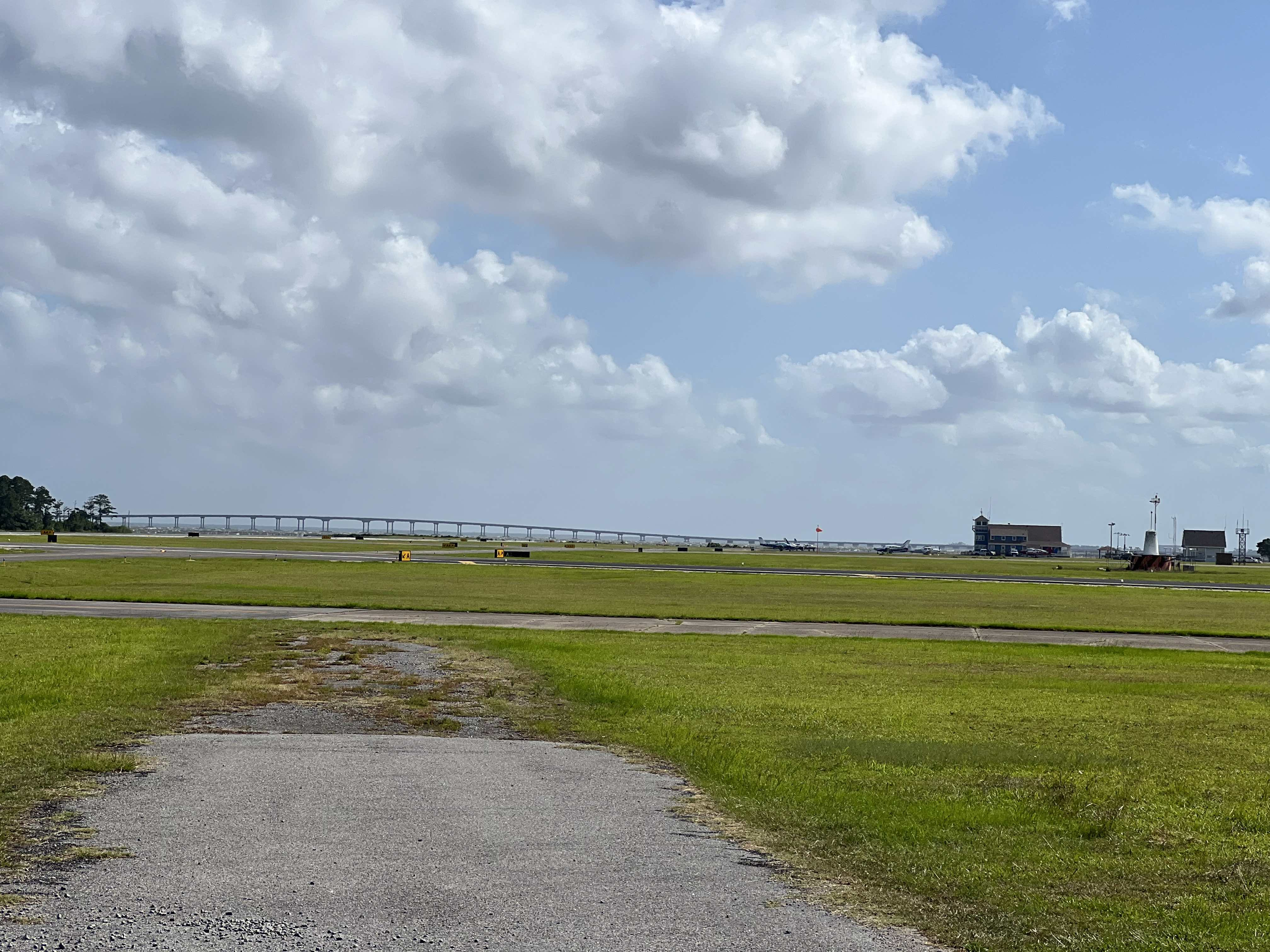
- IATA: MEO; ICAO: KMQI; FAA LID: MQI

Summary
- Airport type: Public
- Owner: Dare County
- Serves: Manteo, North Carolina
- Elevation AMSL: 14 ft (4.3 m)
- Coordinates: 35°55′08″N 75°41′44″W
- Website: Official website

Maps
- FAA airport diagram
- Interactive map of Dare County Regional Airport

Runways
Direction	Length		Surface
Direction	ft	m	Surface
5/23	4,300	1,311	Asphalt
17/35	3,303	1,007	Asphalt

Dare County Regional Airport (IATA: MEO, ICAO: KMQI, FAA LID: MQI) is a public airport located one mile (2 km) northwest of the central business district (CBD) of Manteo, a town in Dare County, North Carolina, United States. This general aviation airport covers 340 acres (138 ha) and has two runways.

The airport offers a small museum chronicling the history of aviation on the Outer Banks. Exhibits include models of aircraft that played a part in the history of Dare County aviation, photos and displays about local aviator Dave Driskill, and the history of the airport.

The airport is adjacent to the North Carolina Aquarium on Roanoke Island.

Although most U.S. airports use the same three-letter location identifier for the FAA and IATA, Dare County Regional Airport is assigned MQI by the FAA and MEO by the IATA (which assigned MQI to Quincy, Massachusetts). The airport's ICAO identifier is KMQI.

FedEx Feeder is operated at the field by Mountain Air Cargo.

== History ==
Since the early 1940s Dare County has been served by a small private airport. A public airport was under construction at the time of the Attack on Pearl Harbor, which prompted the U.S. Navy to abandon its plans to construct a Naval Auxiliary Air Station at Cape Hatteras, and instead focus on this airport, on Roanoke Island, which had a similar runway configuration. The Naval Auxiliary Air Station Manteo (NAAS Manteo) was completed by the Navy and commissioned on March 3, 1943. NAAS Manteo was shared by the Civil Air Patrol and the U.S. Navy. As a naval air installation, NAAS Manteo and was used for special training of squadrons of F4F Wildcats, F6F Hellcats, SB2C Helldivers, TBM and TBF Avengers, PBY Catalinas and F4U Corsairs. The Navy and the U.S. Coast Guard conducted anti-submarine patrols from the airfield until the field was placed in caretaker status December 15, 1945. In 1947, NAAS Manteo was disestablished and control of the airfield was returned to Dare County. In 1983, it was taken over by the Dare County Airport Authority.

The airport briefly saw commercial airline service in 1999 when Cape Air flew to Norfolk, VA using Cessna 402 commuter aircraft.

== Airlines and destinations ==
=== Cargo ===
Airlines	Destinations
FedEx Feeder operated by Mountain Air Cargo	Norfolk
UPS Airlines	Edenton, Norfolk, Raleigh/Durham

== See also ==
- List of airports in North Carolina
