= Henderson–Oxford Airport =

- IATA: none; ICAO: KHNZ; FAA LID: HNZ

Summary
- Airport type: Public
- Owner: Oxford-Henderson Airport Authority
- Serves: Oxford, North Carolina
- Elevation AMSL: 526 ft (160 m)
- Coordinates: 36°21′42″N 078°31′45″W

Map
- Location of airport in North Carolina

Runways
Direction	Length		Surface
Direction	ft	m	Surface
6/24	5,501	1,677	Asphalt

Statistics (2023)
- Aircraft operations (year ending July 1, 2023): 25,200
- Based aircraft: 46
- Source: Federal Aviation Administration

Henderson–Oxford Airport (ICAO: KHNZ, FAA LID: HNZ) is a public use airport located four nautical miles (5 mi, 7 km) northeast of the central business district of Oxford, a city in Granville County, North Carolina, United States. It is owned by the Oxford-Henderson Airport Authority. This airport is included in the National Plan of Integrated Airport Systems for 2011–2015, which categorized it as a general aviation facility.

Many U.S. airports use the same three-letter location identifier for the FAA and IATA. However, this airport is assigned HNZ by the FAA but has no designation from the IATA. The airport's ICAO identifier is KHNZ.

== Facilities and aircraft ==
Henderson–Oxford Airport covers an area of 220 acres (89 ha) at an elevation of 526 feet (160 m) above mean sea level. It has one runway designated 6/24 with an asphalt surface measuring 5,501 by 100 feet (1,677 x 30 m).

For the 12-month period ending July 1, 2023, the airport had 25,200 aircraft operations, an average of 69 per day: 95% general aviation, and 5% military. At that time there were 46 aircraft based at this airport: 41 single-engine, 4 multi-engine, and 1 helicopter.

== See also ==
- List of airports in North Carolina
