= List of airports in Minnesota =

This is a list of airports in the U.S. state of Minnesota, grouped by type and sorted by location. It contains all public-use and military airports in the state. Some private-use and former airports may be included where notable, such as airports that were previously public-use, those with commercial enplanements recorded by the FAA or airports assigned an IATA airport code.

Minnesota

== Airports ==
This list contains the following information:

- **City served** – The city generally associated with the airport, as per the airport's master record with the Federal Aviation Administration. This is not always the actual location since some airports are located in smaller towns outside of the city they serve. It is not meant to be a complete list of cities served, which can be found in or added to each airport's Wikipedia article.
- **FAA** – The location identifier assigned by the Federal Aviation Administration (FAA). These are linked to each airport's page at the Minnesota Department of Transportation.
- **IATA** – The airport code assigned by the International Air Transport Association (IATA). Those that do not match the FAA code are shown in bold.
- **ICAO** – The location indicator assigned by the International Civil Aviation Organization (ICAO).
- **Airport name** – The official airport name. Those shown in **bold** indicate the airport has scheduled passenger service on commercial airlines.
- **Role** – One of four FAA airport categories, as per the 2021–2025 National Plan of Integrated Airport Systems (NPIAS) report released September 2020:
  - P-s: Commercial service – primary are publicly owned airports that receive scheduled passenger service and have more than 10,000 passenger boardings (enplanements) each year. Each primary airport is sub-classified by the FAA as one of the following four "hub" types (s):
    - L: Large hub that accounts for at least 1% of total U.S. passenger enplanements.
    - M: Medium hub that accounts for between 0.25% and 1% of total U.S. passenger enplanements.
    - S: Small hub that accounts for between 0.05% and 0.25% of total U.S. passenger enplanements.
    - N: Nonhub that accounts for less than 0.05% of total U.S. passenger enplanements, but more than 10,000 annual enplanements.
  - CS: Commercial service – nonprimary are publicly owned airports that receive scheduled passenger service and have at least 2,500 passenger boardings each year.
  - R: Reliever airports are designated by the FAA to relieve congestion at a large commercial service airport and to provide more general aviation access to the overall community.
  - GA: General aviation airports are the largest single group of airports in the U.S. airport system. They are public-use airports that do not have scheduled service or have scheduled service with less than 2,500 passenger boardings each year.
- **Enplanements** – The number of enplanements (commercial passenger boardings) that occurred at the airport in calendar year 2024, as per FAA records released October 2025.

City served	FAA	IATA	ICAO	Airport name	Role	Enplanements (2024)
				**Commercial service – primary airports**		
Bemidji	BJI	BJI	KBJI	**Bemidji Regional Airport**	P-N	28,536
Brainerd	BRD	BRD	KBRD	**Brainerd Lakes Regional Airport**	P-N	16,255
Duluth	DLH	DLH	KDLH	**Duluth International Airport**	P-N	135,966
Hibbing	HIB	HIB	KHIB	**Range Regional Airport** (formerly Chisholm–Hibbing Municipal Airport)	P-N	11,294
Minneapolis–Saint Paul	MSP	MSP	KMSP	**Minneapolis–Saint Paul International Airport** (Wold-Chamberlain Field)	P-L	18,054,481
Rochester	RST	RST	KRST	**Rochester International Airport**	P-N	98,537
St. Cloud	STC	STC	KSTC	**St. Cloud Regional Airport**	P-N	23,885
				**Commercial service – nonprimary airports**		
International Falls	INL	INL	KINL	**Falls International Airport** (Einarson Field)	CS	14,842
Thief River Falls	TVF	TVF	KTVF	**Thief River Falls Regional Airport**	CS	8,675
				**Reliever airports**		
Minneapolis / Blaine	ANE		KANE	Anoka County–Blaine Airport (Janes Field)	R	37
Minneapolis / Crystal	MIC	MIC	KMIC	Crystal Airport	R	4
Minneapolis / Eden Prairie	FCM	FCM	KFCM	Flying Cloud Airport	R	381
Minneapolis / Lakeville	LVN		KLVN	Airlake Airport	R	0
St. Paul	STP	STP	KSTP	St. Paul Downtown Airport (Holman Field)	R	41
St. Paul / Lake Elmo	21D			Lake Elmo Airport	R	0
South St. Paul	SGS		KSGS	South St. Paul Municipal Airport (Richard E. Fleming Field)	R	1
				**General aviation airports**		
Aitkin	AIT		KAIT	Aitkin Municipal Airport (Steve Kurtz Field)	GA	0
Albert Lea	AEL	AEL	KAEL	Albert Lea Municipal Airport	GA	0
Alexandria	AXN	AXN	KAXN	Chandler Field	GA	0
Austin	AUM	AUM	KAUM	Austin Municipal Airport	GA	0
Baudette	BDE	BDE	KBDE	Baudette International Airport	GA	0
Benson	BBB	BBB	KBBB	Benson Municipal Airport (Veteran's Field)	GA	0
Blue Earth	SBU		KSBU	Blue Earth Municipal Airport	GA	0
Buffalo	CFE		KCFE	Buffalo Municipal Airport	GA	0
Caledonia	CHU		KCHU	Houston County Airport (Caledonia–Houston County Airport)	GA	153
Cambridge	CBG		KCBG	Cambridge Municipal Airport	GA	0
Canby	CNB		KCNB	Myers Field	GA	0
Cloquet	COQ		KCOQ	Cloquet Carlton County Airport	GA	0
Cook	CQM		KCQM	Cook Municipal Airport	GA	4
Crookston	CKN	CKN	KCKN	Crookston Municipal Airport (Kirkwood Field)	GA	0
Detroit Lakes	DTL	DTL	KDTL	Detroit Lakes Airport (Wething Field)	GA	0
Dodge Center	TOB		KTOB	Dodge Center Airport (Dodge Center Municipal)	GA	0
Duluth	DYT		KDYT	Sky Harbor Airport	GA	0
Elbow Lake	Y63			Elbow Lake Municipal – Pride of the Prairie Airport	GA	0
Ely	ELO	LYU	KELO	Ely Municipal Airport	GA	0
Eveleth	EVM	EVM	KEVM	Eveleth–Virginia Municipal Airport	GA	0
Fairmont	FRM	FRM	KFRM	Fairmont Municipal Airport	GA	1
Faribault	FBL	FBL	KFBL	Faribault Municipal Airport (Liz Wall Strohfus Field)	GA	3
Fergus Falls	FFM	FFM	KFFM	Fergus Falls Municipal Airport (Einar Mickelson Field)	GA	0
Fosston	FSE		KFSE	Fosston Municipal Airport (Anderson Field)	GA	0
Glencoe	GYL		KGYL	Glencoe Municipal Airport (Vernon Perschau Field)	GA	0
Glenwood	GHW		KGHW	Glenwood Municipal Airport	GA	0
Grand Marais	CKC	GRM	KCKC	Grand Marais/Cook County Airport	GA	0
Grand Rapids	GPZ	GPZ	KGPZ	Grand Rapids/Itasca County Airport (Gordon Newstrom Field)	GA	2
Hallock	HCO		KHCO	Hallock Municipal Airport	GA	0
Hawley	04Y			Hawley Municipal Airport	GA	0
Hector	1D6			Hector Municipal Airport	GA	0
Hutchinson	HCD		KHCD	Hutchinson Municipal Airport (Butler Field)	GA	4
Jackson	MJQ	MJQ	KMJQ	Jackson Municipal Airport	GA	0
Le Sueur	12Y			Le Sueur Municipal Airport	GA	0
Litchfield	LJF		KLJF	Litchfield Municipal Airport	GA	0
Little Falls	LXL		KLXL	Little Falls/Morrison County Airport (Lindbergh Field)	GA	0
Long Prairie	14Y			Todd Field	GA	0
Longville	XVG		KXVG	Longville Municipal Airport	GA	3
Luverne	LYV		KLYV	Quentin Aanenson Field	GA	0
Madison	DXX		KDXX	Lac qui Parle County Airport	GA	0
Mahnomen	3N8			Mahnomen County Airport	GA	0
Mankato	MKT	MKT	KMKT	Mankato Regional Airport	GA	6
Marshall	MML	MML	KMML	Southwest Minnesota Regional Marshall Airport (Ryan Field)	GA	0
Montevideo	MVE	MVE	KMVE	Montevideo–Chippewa County Airport	GA	0
Moorhead	JKJ		KJKJ	Moorhead Municipal Airport	GA	0
Moose Lake	MZH		KMZH	Moose Lake Carlton County Airport	GA	0
Mora	JMR		KJMR	Mora Municipal Airport	GA	0
Morris	MOX	MOX	KMOX	Morris Municipal Airport (Charlie Schmidt Field)	GA	0
New Ulm	ULM	ULM	KULM	New Ulm Municipal Airport	GA	0
Orr	ORB		KORB	Orr Regional Airport	GA	0
Ortonville	VVV		KVVV	Ortonville Municipal Airport (Martinson Field)	GA	0
Owatonna	OWA	OWA	KOWA	Owatonna Degner Regional Airport	GA	6
Park Rapids	PKD	PKD	KPKD	Park Rapids Municipal Airport (Konshok Field)	GA	0
Paynesville	PEX		KPEX	Paynesville Municipal Airport	GA	12
Pine River	PWC		KPWC	Pine River Regional Airport	GA	0
Pipestone	PQN		KPQN	Pipestone Municipal Airport	GA	0
Preston	FKA		KFKA	Fillmore County Airport	GA	0
Princeton	PNM		KPNM	Princeton Municipal Airport	GA	0
Red Wing	RGK		KRGK	Red Wing Regional Airport	GA	0
Redwood Falls	RWF	RWF	KRWF	Redwood Falls Municipal Airport	GA	0
Roseau	ROX	ROX	KROX	Roseau Municipal Airport (Rudy Billberg Field)	GA	0
Rush City	ROS		KROS	Rush City Regional Airport	GA	0
Rushford	55Y			Rushford Municipal Airport (Robert W. Bunke Field)	GA	0
St. James	JYG		KJYG	St. James Municipal Airport	GA	0
Sauk Centre	D39			Sauk Centre Municipal Airport	GA	0
Silver Bay	BFW		KBFW	Silver Bay Municipal Airport	GA	0
Springfield	D42			Springfield Municipal Airport	GA	0
Staples	SAZ		KSAZ	Staples Municipal Airport	GA	1
Tower	12D			Tower Municipal Airport	GA	0
Tracy	TKC		KTKC	Tracy Municipal Airport	GA	0
Two Harbors	TWM		KTWM	Richard B. Helgeson Airport	GA	0
Wadena	ADC		KADC	Wadena Municipal Airport	GA	0
Walker	Y49			Walker Municipal Airport	GA	0
Warroad	RRT	RRT	KRRT	Warroad International Memorial Airport (Swede Carlson Field)	GA	0
Waseca	ACQ		KACQ	Waseca Municipal Airport	GA	0
Wheaton	ETH		KETH	Wheaton Municipal Airport	GA	0
Willmar	BDH		KBDH	Willmar Municipal Airport (John L. Rice Field) (replaced ILL)	GA	0
Windom	MWM	MWM	KMWM	Windom Municipal Airport	GA	0
Winona	ONA	ONA	KONA	Winona Municipal Airport (Max Conrad Field)	GA	17
Winsted	10D			Winsted Municipal Airport	GA	0
Worthington	OTG	OTG	KOTG	Worthington Municipal Airport	GA	0
				**Other public-use airports** (not listed in NPIAS)		
Ada / Twin Valley	D00			Norman County Ada/Twin Valley Airport		
Appleton	AQP		KAQP	Appleton Municipal Airport		
Backus	7Y3			Backus Municipal Airport		
Bagley	7Y4			Bagley Municipal Airport		
Bemidji	96M			Moberg Air Base (Seaplane Base)		
Big Falls	7Y9			Big Falls Municipal Airport		
Bigfork	FOZ		KFOZ	Bigfork Municipal Airport		
Bowstring	9Y0			Bowstring Airport		
Brooten	6D1			Brooten Municipal Airport (John O. Bohmer Field)		
Clarissa	8Y5			Clarissa Municipal Airport		
Clear Lake	8Y6			Leaders Clear Lake Airport		
Crane Lake	CDD		KCDD	Scotts Seaplane Base		
Deerwood	M69			Birch Lake Seaplane Base		
Duluth	SS1			North Country Seaplane Base		
East Gull Lake	9Y2			East Gull Lake Airport		
Eveleth	9Y5			Sky Harbor Seaplane Base		
Fertile	D14			Fertile Municipal Airport		
Forest Lake	25D			Forest Lake Airport		
Grand Marais	0G5			Grand Marais/Cook County Seaplane Base		
Granite Falls	GDB		KGDB	Granite Falls Municipal Airport (Lenzen-Roe-Fagan Memorial Field)		
Grygla	3G2			Grygla Municipal Airport (Mel Wilkens Field)		
Henning	05Y			Henning Municipal Airport		
Herman	06Y			Herman Municipal Airport		
Hill City	07Y			Hill City/Quadna Mountain Airport		
Hinckley	04W			Field of Dreams Airport		
International Falls	09I			International Falls Seaplane Base		
Inver Grove Heights	09Y			Wipline Seaplane Base		
Karlstad	23D			Karlstad Municipal Airport		
Lino Lakes	8Y4			Surfside Seaplane Base		
Littlefork	13Y			Littlefork Municipal/Hanover Airport		
Maple Lake	MGG		KMGG	Maple Lake Municipal Airport (Bill Mavencamp Sr. Field)		
McGregor	HZX		KHZX	Isedor Iverson Airport		
Milaca	18Y			Milaca Municipal Airport (Milaca Airport)		
Nary	5C3			Nary National Airport (Shefland Field)		
Northome	43Y			Northome Municipal Airport		
Olivia	OVL		KOVL	Olivia Regional Airport		
Pelican Rapids	47Y			Pelican Rapids Municipal Airport (Lyon's Field)		
Perham	16D			Perham Municipal Airport		9
Pinecreek	48Y			Piney Pinecreek Border Airport		
Red Lake Falls	D81			Red Lake Falls Municipal Airport		
Remer	52Y			Remer Municipal Airport		
Slayton	DVP		KDVP	Slayton Municipal Airport		
Sleepy Eye	Y58			Sleepy Eye Municipal Airport		
Stanton	SYN	SYN	KSYN	Stanton Airfield		
Starbuck	D32			Starbuck Municipal Airport		
Stephen	D41			Stephen Municipal Airport		
Tyler	63Y			Tyler Municipal Airport		
Warren	D37			Warren Municipal Airport		
Waskish	VWU		KVWU	Waskish Municipal Airport		
Waubun	M49			Jolly Fisherman Seaplane Base		
Wells	68Y			Wells Municipal Airport		
				**Other military airports**		
Camp Ripley	RYM		KRYM	Ray S. Miller Army Airfield (National Guard)		
				**Notable private-use airports**		
Angle Inlet	58MN			Northwest Angle Airport		
Isle	MY72			Isle Private Airport (former public-use; publicly owned private-use only)		
Prior Lake	MN76			Marty's Tranquility Base (Seaplane Base) (former public-use, FAA: 45D)		
				**Notable former airports**		
Belle Plaine	~~7Y7~~			A.R.S. Sport Airstrip (A.R.S. Sport Strip)		
Chatfield	~~2C4~~			Flying A Airport		
Deerwood	~~M14~~			Mal's Serpent Lake Seaplane Base		
Grand Marais		~~GRM~~		Devil's Track Municipal Airport (closed 1993, replaced by CKC)		
Motley	~~22Y~~			Morey's Airport		
Murdock	~~23Y~~			Murdock Municipal Airport		
New York Mills				New York Mills Municipal Airport (closed 2011?)		
Pine City	~~90D~~			Pine City Municipal Airport (closed 2001)		
Willmar		~~ILL~~	~~KILL~~	Old Willmar Municipal Airport (closed 2006, replaced by BDH)	~~GA~~	

== See also ==
- Essential Air Service
- Minnesota World War II Army Airfields
- Wikipedia:WikiProject Aviation/Airline destination lists: North America#Minnesota
