= Le Sueur Municipal Airport =

- IATA: none; ICAO: none; FAA LID: 12Y

Summary
- Airport type: Public
- Owner: City of Le Sueur
- Serves: Le Sueur, Minnesota
- Elevation AMSL: 868 ft / 264 m
- Coordinates: 44°26′14″N 093°54′45″W

Map
- Location of airport in Minnesota/United States 12Y (the United States)

Runways
Direction	Length		Surface
Direction	ft	m	Surface
13/31	3,005	915	Asphalt

Statistics (2008)
- Aircraft operations: 2,560
- Based aircraft: 18
- Source: Federal Aviation Administration

The Le Sueur Municipal Airport (FAA LID: 12Y) is an airport on the south side of Le Sueur, Minnesota, United States. It is located on Minnesota State Highway 112. The airport hosts a variety of events, including fly-ins and pancake breakfasts.

== Facilities and aircraft ==
The airport covers an area of 96 acres (39 ha) at an elevation of 868 feet (265 m) above mean sea level. It has one asphalt paved runways: 13/31 is 3,005 by 75 feet (915 x 30 m) and 2/20 is 3,300 by 75 feet (1,006 x 23 m).

For the 12-month period ending August 31, 2019, the airport had 2,550 aircraft operations, an average of 7 per day. It consisted of 98% of general aviation and 2% military. For the same time period, there were 31 aircraft based at the field: 16 helicopters and 15 single-engine airplanes.

The airport has a city-operated FBO offering fuel.

== Accidents & Incidents ==
- On June 24, 1996, a Farland Genesis impacted terrain after a loss of control while operating a local flight at the airport. The student pilot aboard received fatal injuries. Witnesses reported the takeoff seemed normal, but the pilot did a 180-degree turn 100 feet above the ground. The plane veered right and gradually lost altitude until it nosed over. The probable cause was found to be the pilot's impaired judgement due to drugs and failure to control the aircraft, resulting in an uncontrolled descent into terrain.
- On July 13, 2022, a hang glider crashed into a lake nearby in Le Sueur county. The sole pilot was rescued. The crash is under investigation.

== Nearby airports ==
- Fairmont Municipal Airport
- Flying Cloud Airport
- Glencoe Municipal Airport
- Hutchinson Municipal Airport
- New Ulm Municipal Airport
- Mankato Regional Airport
- Minneapolis-St. Paul International Airport
- St. James Municipal Airport
- St. Paul Downtown Airport
- Waseca Municipal Airport

== See also ==
- List of airports in Minnesota
