= Cambridge Municipal Airport =

Cambridge Municipal Airport may refer to:

- Cambridge Municipal Airport (Minnesota) in Cambridge, Minnesota, United States (FAA: CBG)
- Cambridge Municipal Airport (Nebraska) in Cambridge, Nebraska, United States (FAA: CSB)
- Cambridge Municipal Airport (Ohio) in Cambridge, Ohio, United States (FAA: CDI)
