= KROX =

KROX may refer to:

- KROX (AM), a radio station (1260 AM) licensed to Crookston, Minnesota, United States
- KROX-FM, a radio station (101.5 FM) licensed to Buda, Texas, United States
- Roseau Municipal Airport (ICAO code), airport in Roseau, Minnesota
