= Winona Municipal Airport =

Airport in Winona County, Minnesota

Winona Municipal Airport Max Conrad Field
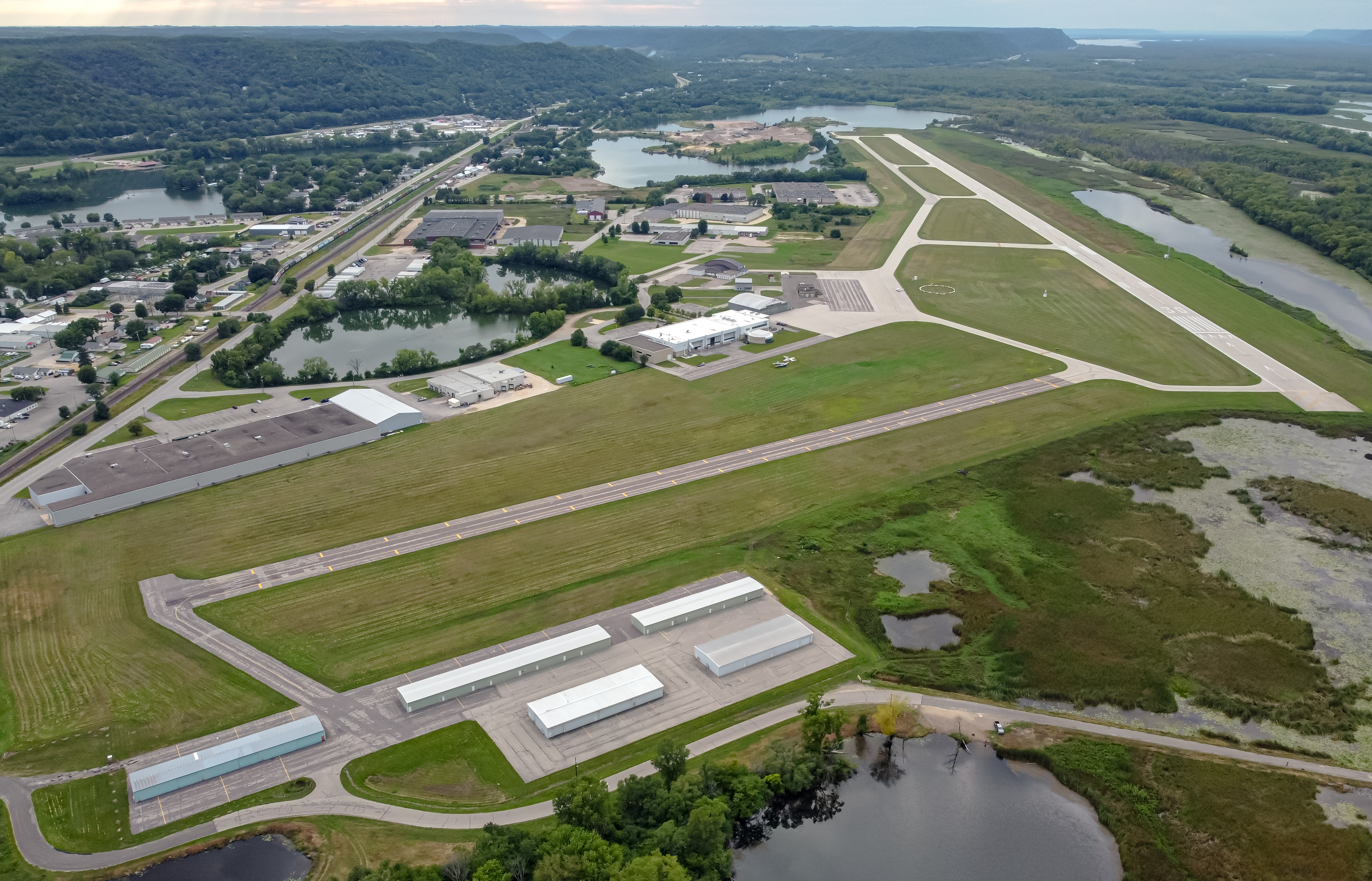
- IATA: ONA; ICAO: KONA; FAA LID: ONA

Summary
- Airport type: Public
- Operator: City of Winona
- Location: Winona, Minnesota
- Elevation AMSL: 656 ft / 200 m
- Coordinates: 44°04′38″N 91°42′30″W

Map

Runways
Direction	Length		Surface
Direction	ft	m	Surface
12/30	5,679	1,731	Asphalt

Statistics
- Aircraft operations (2019): 10,450
- Based aircraft (2021): 30

Winona Municipal Airport (IATA: ONA, ICAO: KONA, FAA LID: ONA) (Max Conrad Field) is located three miles northwest of Winona, Minnesota and next to Goodview on the Mississippi River, in Winona County, Minnesota. It has no scheduled airline flights.

== Facilities ==
The airport covers 575 acres (233 ha) at an elevation of 656 feet (200 m). It has one asphalt runway: 12/30 is 5,679 by 100 feet (1,731 x 30 m).

For the year ending July 31, 2019 the airport had 10,450 aircraft operations, an average of 29 per day: 92% general aviation, 8% air taxi and less than 1% military. In December 2021, there were 30 aircraft based at this airport: 26 single-engine, 2 multi-engine, 1 jet and 1 glider.

== Cargo operations ==
Airlines	Destinations
Bemidji Airlines	Minneapolis/St. Paul

== Past airline service ==
- Wisconsin Central/North Central Airlines served Winona from 1951/52 until 1969/70.
- Mississippi Valley Airlines DHC-6 Twin Otters took over in the 1970s.

== See also ==
- List of airports in Minnesota
- Winona Transit Service
