= Montevideo Airport =

Montevideo airport may refer to:

- Carrasco International Airport, the largest airport in Uruguay, located in Montevideo
- Montevideo-Chippewa County Airport, Minnesota, USA
