= MVE =

MVE or mve may refer to:

- Marwari language, spoken in India (by ISO 639 code)
- Montevideo-Chippewa County Airport, Minnesota, USA (by IATA code)
- Murray Valley Encephalitis
- Manifestacion de valor electronica: documento obligatorio para todos los importadores en régimen definitivo. Su objetivo es declarar con precisión el valor en aduana de las mercancías que ingresan al país.
