= LJF =

LJF may refer to:

- London Jazz Festival
- London Jewish Forum
- Lecsinel Jean-François
- Litchfield Municipal Airport (Minnesota)
