= JYG =

JYG may refer to:

- IATA code for St. James Municipal Airport, St. James, Minnesota
- URL abbreviation for Jiayuguan City, Gansu province, China
- Station code for Jaynagar railway station, Bihar, India
