= KSAZ =

KSAZ may refer to:

- KSAZ (AM), a radio station (580 AM) licensed to Marana, Arizona, United States
- KSAZ-TV, a television station (channel 10) licensed to Phoenix, Arizona, United States
- The ICAO airport code for Staples Municipal Airport, located in Staples, Minnesota, United States
- Kokang Self-Administered Zone
