= KCOQ =

KCOQ may refer to:

- KCOQ (FM), a radio station (98.9 FM) licensed to serve Steamboat Springs, Colorado, United States
- KKSB, a radio station (1230 AM) licensed to serve Steamboat Springs, Colorado, which held the call sign KCOQ from 2017 to 2018
- Cloquet Carlton County Airport (ICAO KCOQ)
