= Hutchinson Municipal Airport =

Hutchinson Municipal Airport may refer to:

- Hutchinson Municipal Airport (Kansas) in Hutchinson, Kansas, United States (FAA/IATA: HUT)
- Hutchinson Municipal Airport (Minnesota) in Hutchinson, Minnesota, United States (FAA: HCD)
