= Kelo =

Kelo or KELO may refer to:

- Kelo, a wood art from Finnish and Russian Lapland
- Kélo, a city in Chad
- Kelo v. City of New London, a controversial U.S. Supreme Court decision regarding eminent domain
- the ICAO code for Ely Municipal Airport
- keloid
- Kelo (J. J. Johnson song), a composition by jazz musician J. J. Johnson
- Kelo language, a Nilo-Saharan language of Sudan

In broadcasting:

- KELO (AM), a radio station (1320 AM) licensed to Sioux Falls, South Dakota, United States
- KELO-FM, a radio station (92.5 FM) licensed to Sioux Falls, South Dakota, United States
- KELO-TV, a television station (channel 11 digital) licensed to Sioux Falls, South Dakota, United States
