= Tracy Municipal Airport =

Tracy Municipal Airport may refer to:

- Tracy Municipal Airport (California) in Tracy, California, United States (FAA: TCY)
- Tracy Municipal Airport (Minnesota) in Tracy, Minnesota, United States (FAA: TKC)
