= KLXL =

KLXL may refer to:

- Little Falls/Morrison County Airport (ICAO code KLXL)
- KLXL (FM), a defunct radio station (91.9 FM) formerly licensed to serve Springfield, Colorado, United States
- KTTE, a defunct radio station (90.1 FM) formerly licensed to serve Humboldt, Nebraska, United States, which held the call sign KLXL in 2016
