= D42 =

D42, D-42 or D.42 may refer to:

- Arm, cubit symbol (hieroglyph)
- D42 road (Croatia)
- Greek destroyer Kimon (D42), a Fletcher-class destroyer of the Greek Navy
- HMS Curlew (D42), a C-class light cruiser of the Royal Navy
- HMS Empress (D42), a Ruler-class escort carrier of the Royal Navy
- HMS Windsor (D42), a W-class destroyer of the Royal Navy
- Springfield Municipal Airport (Minnesota)
