= KPQN =

KPQN may refer to:

- KPQN (FM), a radio station (96.1 FM) licensed to serve Roswell, New Mexico, United States
- Pipestone Municipal Airport (ICAO code KPQN)
