= Glencoe Municipal Airport =

- IATA: none; ICAO: KGYL; FAA LID: GYL

Summary
- Airport type: Public
- Owner: City of Glencoe
- Serves: Glencoe, Minnesota
- Elevation AMSL: 992.5 ft / 302.5 m
- Coordinates: 44°45′21.6210″N 094°04′53.2580″W
- Website: https://www.glencoemn.org/services/airport/

Map
- Location of airport in Minnesota/United States GYL (the United States)

Runways
Direction	Length		Surface
Direction	ft	m	Surface
13/31	3,300 x 75	1,006 x 23	Asphalt

Glencoe Municipal Airport (ICAO: KGYL, FAA LID: GYL) also known as Vernon Perschau Field is a city-owned public-use airport located three miles south-east of the city of Glencoe, Minnesota in McLeod County.

== Facilities and aircraft ==
Glencoe Airport contains one runway designated 13/31 with a 3,300 x 75 ft (1,006 x 23 m) asphalt surface. For the 12-month period ending April 30, 2018, the airport had 10,615 aircraft operations, an average of 29 per day: 76% local-general aviation and 26% transient general aviation. The airport housed 24 single-engine airplanes and one multi-engine airplane.

== See also ==
- List of airports in Minnesota
