= Granite Falls Municipal Airport =

Granite Falls Municipal Airport Lenzen-Roe Memorial Field
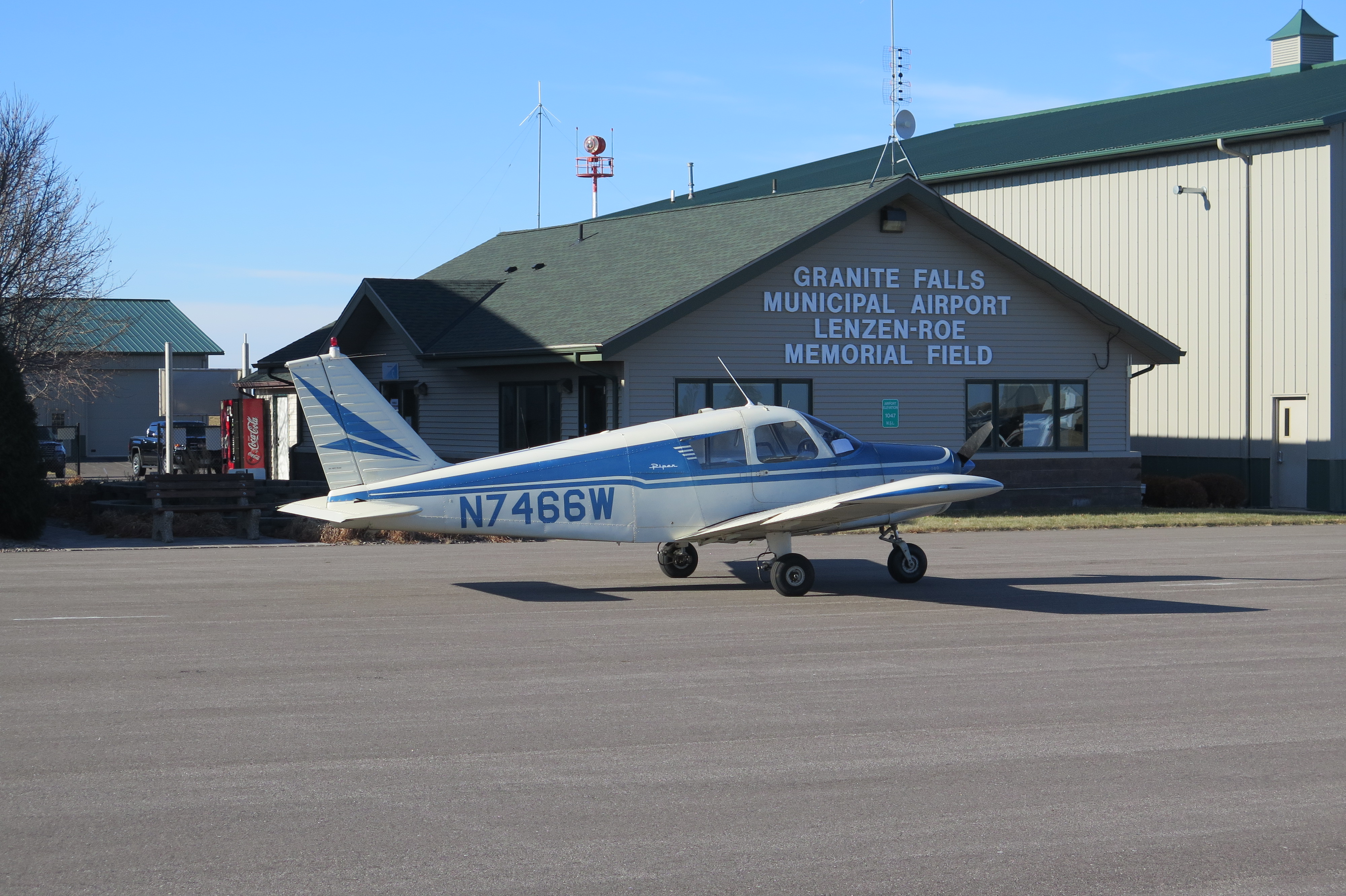
- IATA: none; ICAO: KGDB; FAA LID: GDB

Summary
- Airport type: Public
- Owner: City of Granite Falls
- Serves: Granite Falls, Minnesota
- Elevation AMSL: 1,047 ft (319 m)
- Coordinates: 44°45′12″N 095°33′22″W
- Website: GraniteFalls.com/...

Map
- Location of airport in Minnesota GDB (the United States)

Runways
Direction	Length		Surface
Direction	ft	m	Surface
15/33	4,350	1,326	Asphalt

Statistics (2006)
- Aircraft operations: 7,000
- Based aircraft: 15
- Sources: Minnesota DOT, FAA

Granite Falls Municipal Airport (ICAO: KGDB, FAA LID: GDB, formerly 1G2), also known as Lenzen-Roe Memorial Field (or Lenzen-Roe-Fagen Memorial Field), is a public-use airport in Yellow Medicine County, Minnesota, United States. It is owned by the City of Granite Falls and located four nautical miles (7 km) south of its central business district. The airport is situated near State Highway 23.

Although most U.S. airports use the same three-letter location identifier for the FAA and IATA, this airport is assigned GDB by the FAA but has no designation from the IATA

== Facilities and aircraft ==
The airport covers an area of 152 acres (62 ha) at an elevation of 1,047 feet (319 m) above mean sea level. It has one runway designated 15/33 with an asphalt surface measuring 4,350 by 75 feet (1,326 x 23 m).

For the 12-month period ending August 31, 2006, the airport had 7,000 general aviation aircraft operations, an average of 19 per day. At that time there were 15 aircraft based at this airport: 11 single-engine, 2 multi-engine and 2 jet.

== See also ==
- List of airports in Minnesota
