= Scotts Seaplane Base =

- IATA: none; ICAO: KCDD; FAA LID: CDD

Summary
- Airport type: Public
- Owner: Darrell Scott
- Serves: Crane Lake, Minnesota
- Elevation AMSL: 1,119 ft / 341 m
- Coordinates: 48°16′0″N 92°29′1″W

Map
- Location of airport in Minnesota CDD (the United States)

Runways
Direction	Length		Surface
Direction	ft	m	Surface
7W/25W	8,000	2,438	Water
16W/34W	7,000	2,134	Water

Statistics (2003)
- Aircraft operations: 8,000
- Source: Federal Aviation Administration

Scotts Seaplane Base (ICAO: KCDD, FAA LID: CDD) is a public use seaplane base located in the community of Crane Lake, in Saint Louis County, Minnesota, United States. It is privately owned by Darrell Scott and is also known at Scott's Seaplane Base.

Although most U.S. airports use the same three-letter location identifier for the FAA and IATA, Scotts Seaplane Base is assigned CDD by the FAA but has no designation from the IATA (which assigned CDD to Cauquira, Honduras).

== Facilities and aircraft ==
Scotts Seaplane Base covers an area of 5 acres (2.0 ha) at an elevation of 1,119 feet (341 m) above mean sea level. It has two seaplane landing areas: 7W/25W is 8,000 x 1,000 feet (2,438 x 305 m) and 16W/34W is 7,000 x 1,000 feet (2,134 x 305 m). For the 12-month period ending June 30, 2003, the airport had 8,000 aircraft operations, an average of 21 per day: 61% general aviation and 39% air taxi.

== See also ==
- List of airports in Minnesota
