= Worthington Municipal Airport =

Airport in Minnesota, United States

Worthington Airport
- IATA: OTG; ICAO: KOTG; FAA LID: OTG

Summary
- Airport type: Public
- Owner: City of Worthington
- Serves: Worthington, Minnesota, U.S.
- Elevation AMSL: 1,574 ft / 479.8 m
- Coordinates: 43°39′18.2000″N 095°34′45.1000″W

Map
- Location of airport in Minnesota/United States KOTG (the United States)

Runways
Direction	Length		Surface
Direction	ft	m	Surface
11/29	5,500 x 100	1,676 x 30	Asphalt
18/36	4,200 x 75	1,280 x 23	Asphalt

Worthington Municipal Airport (IATA: OTG, ICAO: KOTG, FAA LID: OTG) is a city-owned public-use airport located 2 miles (3.2 km) north of the city of Worthington, in Nobles County, Minnesota, United States.

== Facilities and aircraft ==
Worthington Airport contains two runways, one designated 11/29 with a 5,500 x 100 ft (1,676 x 30 m) asphalt surface and one designated 18/36 with a 4,200 x 75 ft (1,280 x 23 m) asphalt surface. For the 12-month period ending July 31, 2019, the airport had 12,220 aircraft operations, an average of 28 per day: 69% general aviation, 25% transient general aviation, 5% military, and 1% air taxi. The airport houses 23 single-engine airplanes, three multi-engine airplanes, and one jet airplane.

== See also ==
- List of airports in Minnesota
