= Grygla Municipal Airport =

- IATA: none; ICAO: none; FAA LID: 3G2

Summary
- Airport type: Public
- Owner: City of Grygla
- Serves: Grygla, Minnesota
- Elevation AMSL: 1,177 ft (359 m)
- Coordinates: 48°17′55.58″N 095°37′35.88″W

Map
- Location of airport in Minnesota 3G2 (the United States)

Runways
Direction	Length		Surface
Direction	ft	m	Surface
17/35	3,437	1,048	Turf
- Source: Federal Aviation Administration

Grygla Municipal Airport - Mel Wilkens Field (FAA LID: 3G2) is city-owned public-use airport located one mile southwest of the central business district of Grygla, a city in Marshall County, Minnesota.

== History ==
Planning for the airport began in 1991. The airport was officially opened on August 25, 2002. The airport was dedicated to Mel Wilkens, a local pilot and resident of Grygla.

The local Lions Clubs chapter hosts a fly-in every year on the last Sunday before Labor Day.

== Facilities and aircraft ==
Grygla Municipal Airport covers an area of 78 acres which contains one runway designated 17/35 with a 3,437 ft × 92 ft (1,048 m × 28 m) turf surface. For the 12-month period ending May 31, 2017, the airport had 400 general aviation aircraft operations.

== See also ==
- List of airports in Minnesota
