= Hawley Municipal Airport =

- IATA: none; ICAO: none; FAA LID: 04Y

Summary
- Airport type: Public
- Owner: City of Hawley
- Serves: Hawley, Minnesota, US
- Elevation AMSL: 1,209.7 ft / 368.7 m
- Coordinates: 46°53′01.6000″N 096°21′02.2000″W
- Website: https://hawley.govoffice.com/airport

Map
- Location of airport in Minnesota/United States 04Y (the United States)

Runways
Direction	Length		Surface
Direction	ft	m	Surface
16/34	3,398 x 75	1,036 x 23	Asphalt

Hawley Municipal Airport (FAA LID: MY99) is a city-owned public-use airport located four miles south-east of the city of Hawley, Minnesota in Clay County.

== Facilities and aircraft ==
Hawley Airport contains one runway designated 16/24 with a 3,398 x 75 ft (1,036 x 23 m) turf surface. For the 12-month period ending June 30, 2019, the airport had 8,600 aircraft operations, an average of 23.56 per day: 53.5% local-general aviation and 46.5% transient general aviation. The airport housed 26 single-engine airplanes and one helicopter.

== See also ==
- List of airports in Minnesota
