= Wheaton Municipal Airport =

- IATA: none; ICAO: KETH; FAA LID: ETH

Summary
- Airport type: Public
- Owner: City of Wheaton
- Serves: Wheaton, Minnesota
- Elevation AMSL: 1,023 ft / 312 m
- Coordinates: 45°46′49.80″N 096°32′37.90″W

Map
- Location of airport in Minnesota / United States ETH (the United States)

Runways
Direction	Length		Surface
Direction	ft	m	Surface
16/34	3,298	1,005	Asphalt
6/24	1,953	595	Turf

Statistics
- Aircraft operations (year ending 7/31/2018): 3,900
- Based aircraft: 8
- Source: Federal Aviation Administration

Wheaton Municipal Airport (ICAO: KETH, FAA LID: ETH) is a city-owned public-use airport located three miles southwest of the central business district of Wheaton, a city in Traverse County, Minnesota, United States.

== Facilities and aircraft ==
Wheaton Municipal Airport covers an area of 110 acres and contains two runways: runway 16/34 has a 3,298 x 75 ft (1,005 x 23 m) asphalt surface and 6/24 is a 1,953 x 175 ft (595 x 53 m) turf surface.

For the 12-month period ending July 31, 2018, the airport had 3,900 aircraft operations, an average of 75 per week: 100% general aviation. In July 2018, there were 8 aircraft based at this airport: 6 single-engine, and 2 multi-engine.

== See also ==
- List of airports in Minnesota
