= Windom Municipal Airport =

Windom Airport
- IATA: MWM; ICAO: KMWM; FAA LID: MWM

Summary
- Airport type: Public
- Owner: City of Windom
- Serves: Windom, Minnesota
- Elevation AMSL: 1,410.8 ft / 430 m
- Coordinates: 43°54′48.2820″N 095°06′33.8400″W
- Website: https://windom-mn.com/city-facilities/windom-municipal-airport/

Map
- Location of airport in Minnesota/United States KMWM (the United States)

Runways
Direction	Length		Surface
Direction	ft	m	Surface
17/35	3,598 x 75	1,097 x 23	Concrete

Windom Municipal Airport (IATA: MWM, ICAO: KMWM, FAA LID: MWM) is a city-owned public-use airport located three miles north of the city of Windom, Minnesota in Cottonwood County.

== Facilities and aircraft ==
Windom Airport contains one runway designated 17/35 with a 3,598 x 75 ft (1,097 x 23 m) concrete surface. For the 12 months ending April 30, 2017, the airport had 8,300 aircraft operations, an average of 22.74 per day: 48.2% being local-general aviation, 48.2% being transient general aviation and 3.6% being air-taxi. The airport housed 14 single-engine airplanes, one multi-engine airplane, and one jet engine-airplane.

== See also ==
- List of airports in Minnesota
