= Winstock Country Music Festival =

Music festival in Minnesota, United States

Coordinates: 44°56′55″N 94°3′26″W

- Genre: Country music
- Dates: June 17-18, 2022
- Location: Winsted, Minnesota
- Years active: 1994 - Current
- Founders: Winstock Committee
- Website: Official Website

The Winstock Country Music Festival is a two-day country music festival that is held in Winsted, Minnesota, United States. The festival usually draws 12,000-15,000 people each day and is usually held in the first two weeks of June. It is often considered to be the first major country music festival of the summer in the upper Midwest.

== History ==
The Winstock Country Music Festival was started in 1994 by a group of Holy Trinity School and Parish boosters. It was to be a fundraiser for the school and parish. The first Winstock was held at the Winsted Municipal Airport and one of the headliners was local country star Paulette Carlson.

Since then, Winstock has grown and moved across the road to land the festival now owns. Camping and reserved seating are often available at this new location. A second stage was added in 2005 known as the emerging artist stage and has featured rising talent such as Keith Anderson, Little Big Town, and Sugarland. Notable performers at Winstock have included Alabama, Tim McGraw, Montgomery Gentry, Reba McEntire, Brad Paisley, Brett Eldredge, Brooks and Dunn, Martina McBride, Lee Brice, Gary Allan, Miranda Lambert, Luke Combs, Alan Jackson, Waylon Jennings, Toby Keith, Willie Nelson, Jake Owen, and Blake Shelton.

== See also ==
- List of country music festivals
- Country music
