= Fertile Municipal Airport =

- IATA: none; ICAO: none; FAA LID: D14

Summary
- Airport type: Public
- Owner: City of Fertile
- Location: Fertile, Minnesota
- Time zone: CST (UTC−06:00)
  - Summer (DST): CDT (UTC−05:00)
- Elevation AMSL: 1,135 ft (346 m)
- Coordinates: 47°33′6.9″N 096°17′31.9″W

Map
- Location of airport in Minnesota D14 (the United States)

Runways
Direction	Length		Surface
Direction	ft	m	Surface
14/32	3,002 x 60	915 x 18.3	Asphalt
- Sources: Minnesota DOT, FAA

Fertile Municipal Airport (FAA LID: D14) is a public use airport located 1 nautical mile (1.9 km; 1.2 mi) northwest of the central business district of Fertile, Polk County, Minnesota, United States. It is owned by the City of Fertile.

The airport originally belonged to a flying club. The airport became a municipal airport in order to be eligible for state and federal airport funds.

== Facilities and aircraft ==
Fertile Municipal Airport covers an area of 130 acres (53 ha) at an elevation of 1,135 feet (346 m) above mean sea level. It has one runway designated 14/32 with an asphalt surface measuring 3,002 by 60 feet (915 x 18.3 m).

For the 12-month period ending July 31, 2018, the airport had 7,800 general aviation aircraft operations, an average of 21 per day.

== See also ==
- List of airports in Minnesota
