= Cook Municipal Airport =

- IATA: none; ICAO: KCQM; FAA LID: CQM

Summary
- Airport type: Public
- Owner: City of Cook
- Serves: Cook, Minnesota
- Elevation AMSL: 1,328.9 ft / 405.0 m
- Coordinates: 47°49′20.2141″N 092°41′22.2900″W

Map
- Location of airport in Minnesota/United States KCQM (the United States)

Runways
Direction	Length		Surface
Direction	ft	m	Surface
13/31	4,000 x 75	1,219 x 23	Asphalt

Cook Municipal Airport (ICAO: KCQM, FAA LID: CQM) is a city-owned public-use airport located two miles south of the city of Cook, Minnesota in Saint Louis County.

== Facilities and aircraft ==
Cook Airport contains one runway designated 13/31 with a 4,000 x 75 ft (1,219 x 23 m) asphalt surface. For the 12-month period ending July 31, 2017, the airport had 5,928 aircraft operations, an average of 16.28 per day: 71% general aviation and 29% transient general aviation. The airport housed 21 single-engine airplanes and two Ultralight airplanes.

== See also ==
- List of airports in Minnesota
