= Alexandria Municipal Airport =

Alexandria Regional Airport Chandler Field
- IATA: AXN; ICAO: KAXN; FAA LID: AXN

Summary
- Airport type: Public
- Owner: City of Alexandria
- Serves: Alexandria, Minnesota
- Elevation AMSL: 1,425 ft (434 m)
- Coordinates: 45°51′59″N 095°23′41″W

Map
- Location of airport in Minnesota / United States AXN (the United States)

Runways
| Direction | Length | | Surface |
| Direction | ft | m | Surface |
|---|---|---|---|
| 13/31 | 5,099 | 1,554 | Asphalt |
| 4/22 | 4,098 | 1,249 | Asphalt |

Statistics
- Aircraft operations (2014): 25,500
- Based aircraft (2021): 74
- Source: Minnesota DOT, FAA

Alexandria Regional Airport (IATA: AXN, ICAO: KAXN, FAA LID: AXN), also known as Chandler Field, is a city-owned public-use airport located two nautical miles (3.7 km) southwest of the central business district of Alexandria, a city in Douglas County, Minnesota, United States.

== Facilities and aircraft ==
The airport covers an area of 640 acres (260 ha) at an elevation of 1,425 feet (434 m) above mean sea level. It has two asphalt paved runways: 13/31 is 5,099 by 100 feet (1,554 x 30 m) and 4/22 is 4,098 by 75 feet (1,249 x 23 m).

For the 12-month period ending August 31, 2014, the airport had 25,500 aircraft operations, an average of 70 per day: 90% general aviation, 9% air taxi and 1% military. In August 2021, there were 74 aircraft based at this airport: 68 single-engine, 3 multi-engine, 1 helicopter and 2 ultralights.

=== Cargo ===
| Airlines | Destinations |
|---|---|
| Bemidji Airlines | Minneapolis/St. Paul, Fargo |
| UPS | Minneapolis/St. Paul |

== Airport Operations ==
Several operations and/or businesses at the airport include the following:

- Alexandria Aircraft LLC - Parts dealer for Bellanca aircraft.
- Alexandria Aviation - Aircraft Sales, Rental, Flight Training, Chater, Fueling
- LifeLink III - 24/7 medical helicopter service
- On His Wings Flight Academy - Instrument flight instruction school
- Weber's Aero Repair - Aircraft repairs and restorations

== Historical Scheduled Service ==
Northwest Airlines offered service to Alexandria on its Minneapolis to Winnipeg, Canada route in 1928.

In August of 1929, Several Minneapolis and Winnipeg, Canada investors formed Canadian-American Airlines, Incorporated. Using six-passenger Travel Air monoplanes, the new line provided for daily five-hour flights between St. Paul and Winnipeg with stops at Minneapolis, St. Cloud, Alexandria, Fergus Falls, Fargo ND, and Grand Forks, ND.

In 1952 Wisconsin Central Airlines began scheduled service for a short time. The flight route was from Minneapolis–St. Paul International Airport, St. Cloud, Alexandria, and Fargo, ND.

In December 1972 Mississippi Valley Airlines had scheduled service to Minneapolis–St. Paul International Airport and Willmar Municipal Airport

== FAA Award History ==
In 2020 the airport received a $30,000 CARES Act award.

== See also ==
- List of airports in Minnesota
