= Jolly Fisherman Seaplane Base =

- IATA: none; ICAO: none; FAA LID: M49

Summary
- Airport type: Public
- Owner: David Buelow
- Operator: Anne Buelow
- Location: Waubun, Minnesota
- Elevation AMSL: 1,499 ft (457 m)
- Coordinates: 47°08′35″N 095°31′44″W
- Website: JollyFisherman.com

Map
- Location of airport in Minnesota M49 (the United States)

Runways
Direction	Length		Surface
Direction	ft	m	Surface
8/26	5,000	1,524	Water

Statistics (2003)
- Aircraft operations: 80
- Sources: Minnesota DOT, FAA

Jolly Fisherman Seaplane Base (FAA LID: M49) is a public use seaplane base located on Elbow Lake in Becker County, Minnesota, United States. It is 17 nautical miles (31 km) east of the central business district of Waubun, a city in Mahnomen County. The airport is privately owned and managed by Anne Buelow, owner of the Jolly Fisherman Resort.

== Facilities and aircraft ==
Jolly Fisherman Seaplane Base covers an area of 2 acres (0.81 ha) at an elevation of 1,499 feet (457 m) above mean sea level. It has one seaplane landing area designated 8/26 which measures 5,000 by 1,800 feet (1,524 x 549 m). For the 12-month period ending September 30, 2003, the airport had 80 general aviation aircraft operations, an average of 6 per month.

== See also ==
- List of airports in Minnesota
