= Fillmore County Airport =

- IATA: none; ICAO: KFKA; FAA LID: FKA

Summary
- Airport type: Public
- Owner: Fillmore County
- Serves: Preston, Minnesota
- Elevation AMSL: 389 m (1,276 ft)
- Coordinates: 43°40′34″N 092°10′46″W

Map
- Location of airport in Minnesota/United States FKA (the United States)

Runways
Direction	Length		Surface
Direction	ft	m	Surface
11/29	4,001	1,220	Asphalt
- Source: Federal Aviation Administration

Fillmore County Airport (ICAO: KFKA, FAA LID: FKA), is a public use airport located close to Preston, a city in Fillmore County, Minnesota, United States. It is owned by Fillmore County.

The county acquired land for the airport in 1967. A 3200 feet turf runway opened in 1970. The runway was first paved lighted in 1975. The runway was extended to 4000 feet in 1989. A parallel taxiway was added in 2005. The current Arrival/Departures building was opened in 1981 and is dedicated to Bernard Pietenpol.

Although most U.S. airports use the same three-letter location identifier for the FAA and IATA, this airport is assigned FKA by the FAA but has no designation from the IATA.

== See also ==
- List of airports in Minnesota
