= Buffalo Municipal Airport (Minnesota) =

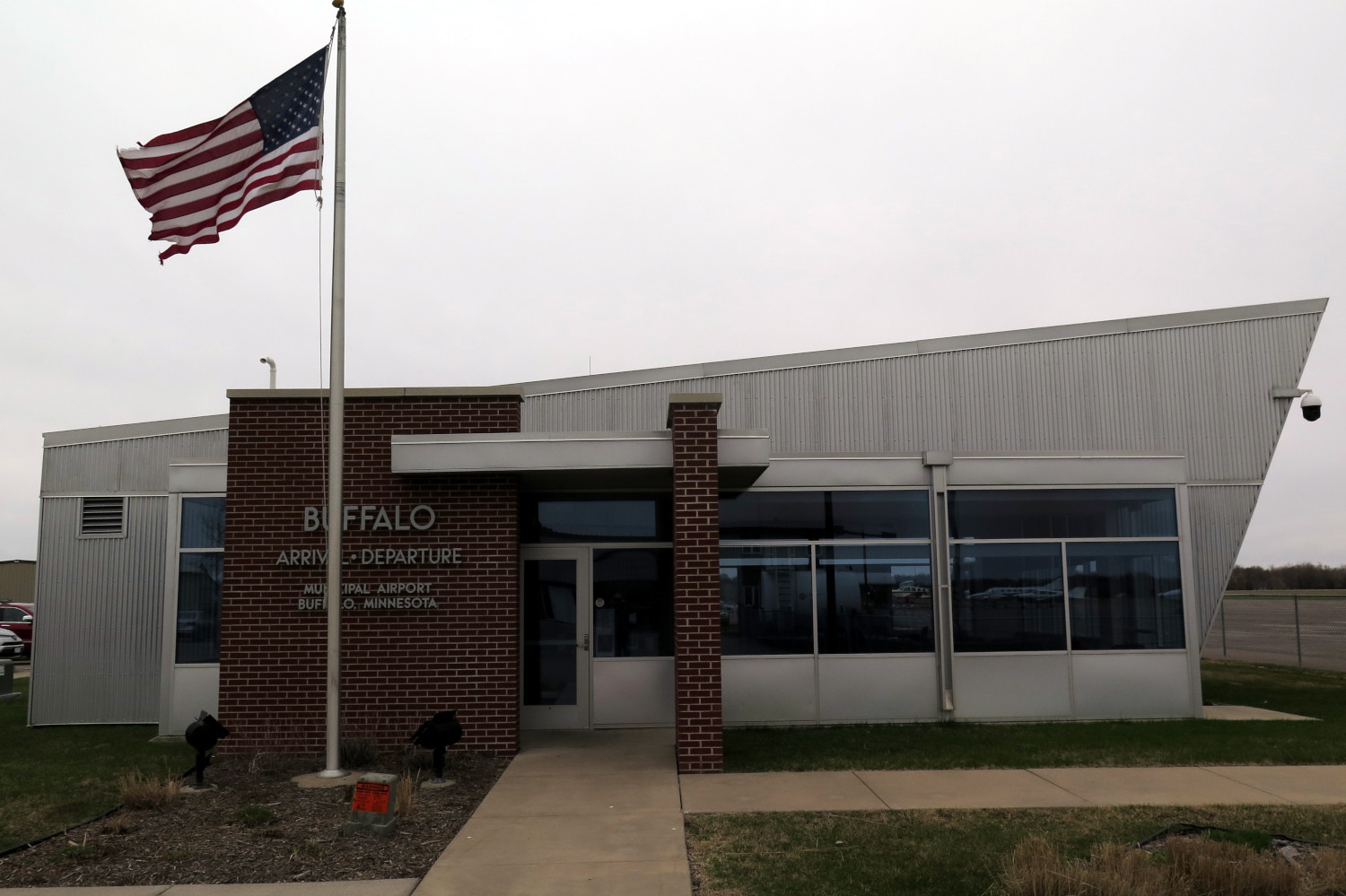
- IATA: none; ICAO: KCFE; FAA LID: CFE

Summary
- Airport type: Public
- Owner: City of Buffalo
- Serves: Buffalo, Minnesota
- Opened: 1966
- Elevation AMSL: 967 ft (295 m)
- Coordinates: 45°09′33″N 093°50′36″W

Map
- Location of airport in Minnesota/United States CFE (the United States)

Runways
Direction	Length		Surface
Direction	ft	m	Surface
18/36	2,600	792	Asphalt

Statistics (2006)
- Aircraft operations: 22,350
- Based aircraft (2016): 67
- Source: Federal Aviation Administration

Buffalo Municipal Airport (ICAO: KCFE, FAA LID: CFE) is a city-owned public-use airport located two miles (3 km) southeast of the central business district of Buffalo, a city in Wright County, Minnesota, United States.

Although most U.S. airports use the same three-letter location identifier for the FAA and IATA, Buffalo Municipal Airport is assigned CFE by the FAA but has no designation from the IATA (which assigned CFE to Clermont-Ferrand Auvergne Airport in Clermont-Ferrand, Auvergne, France).

== Facilities and aircraft ==
Buffalo Municipal Airport covers an area of 57 acres (23 ha) and has one runway designated 18/36 with a 2,600 x 60 ft (792 x 18 m) asphalt surface. For the 12-month period ending August 31, 2006, the airport had 22,350 aircraft operations, an average of 61 per day: 98% general aviation, 1% air taxi and 1% military. In November 2016, there were 67 aircraft based at this airport: 63 single-engine and 4 multi-engine.

The airport opened in 1966 with a single 2600 foot grass runway. The runway was paved and lighted in 1986.

The current Arrivals and Departures building was built in 2007.

A Lockheed T-33A serial number 51-9235 is on display near the entrance of the airport.

== Gallery ==
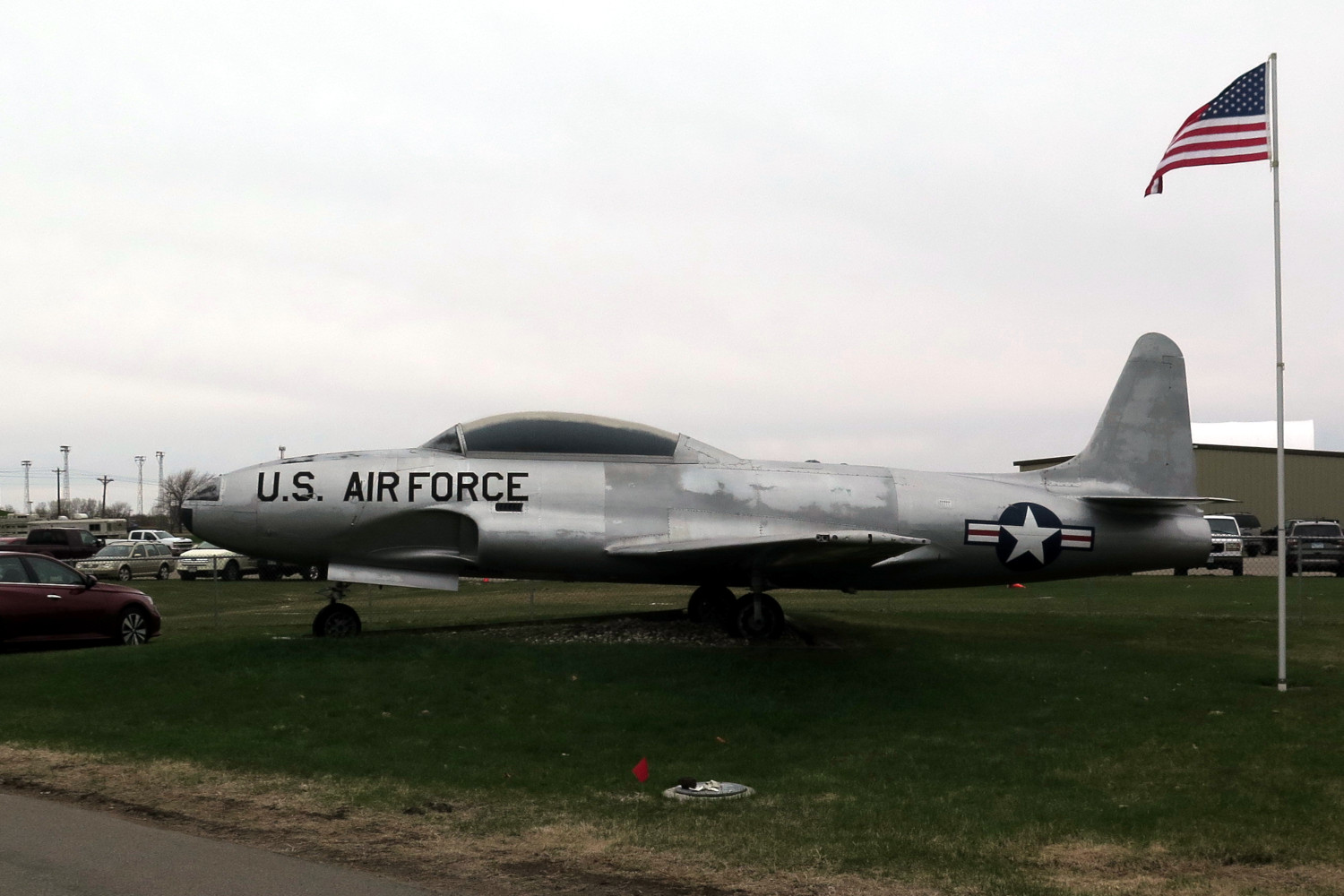
1951 Lockheed T-33A Shooting Star, c/n: 580-7019, 51-9235

== See also ==
- List of airports in Minnesota
