= Tower Municipal Airport =

- IATA: none; ICAO: none; FAA LID: 12D

Summary
- Airport type: Public
- Owner: City of Tower
- Serves: Tower, Minnesota
- Elevation AMSL: 1,369 ft / 417 m
- Coordinates: 47°49′06″N 092°17′30″W

Map
- Location of airport in Minnesota / United States 12D (the United States)

Runways
Direction	Length		Surface
Direction	ft	m	Surface
8/26	3,400	1,036	Asphalt
14W/32W	5,000	1,524	Water

Statistics
- Aircraft operations (2007): 3,700
- Based aircraft (2017): 15
- Source: Federal Aviation Administration

Tower Municipal Airport (FAA LID: 12D) is a city-owned public-use airport located one nautical mile (2 km) northwest of the central business district of Tower, a city in Saint Louis County, Minnesota, United States. It is located on Lake Vermilion and is also known as Tower Municipal Airport & Seaplane Base.

== Facilities and aircraft ==
Tower Municipal Airport covers an area of 100 acres (40 ha) at an elevation of 1,369 feet (417 m) above mean sea level. It has two runways designated 8/26 with a 3,400 x 75 ft (1,036 x 23 m) asphalt surface. It also has one seaplane runway landing area designated 14W/32W which measures 5,000 x 200 ft (1,524 x 61 m).

For the 12-month period ending April 30, 2007, the airport had 3,700 general aviation aircraft operations, an average of 10 per day. In March 2017, there were 15 aircraft based at this airport: 14 single-engine and 1 ultralight.

== See also ==
- List of airports in Minnesota
