= Willmar Municipal Airport =

Willmar Municipal Airport John L. Rice Field
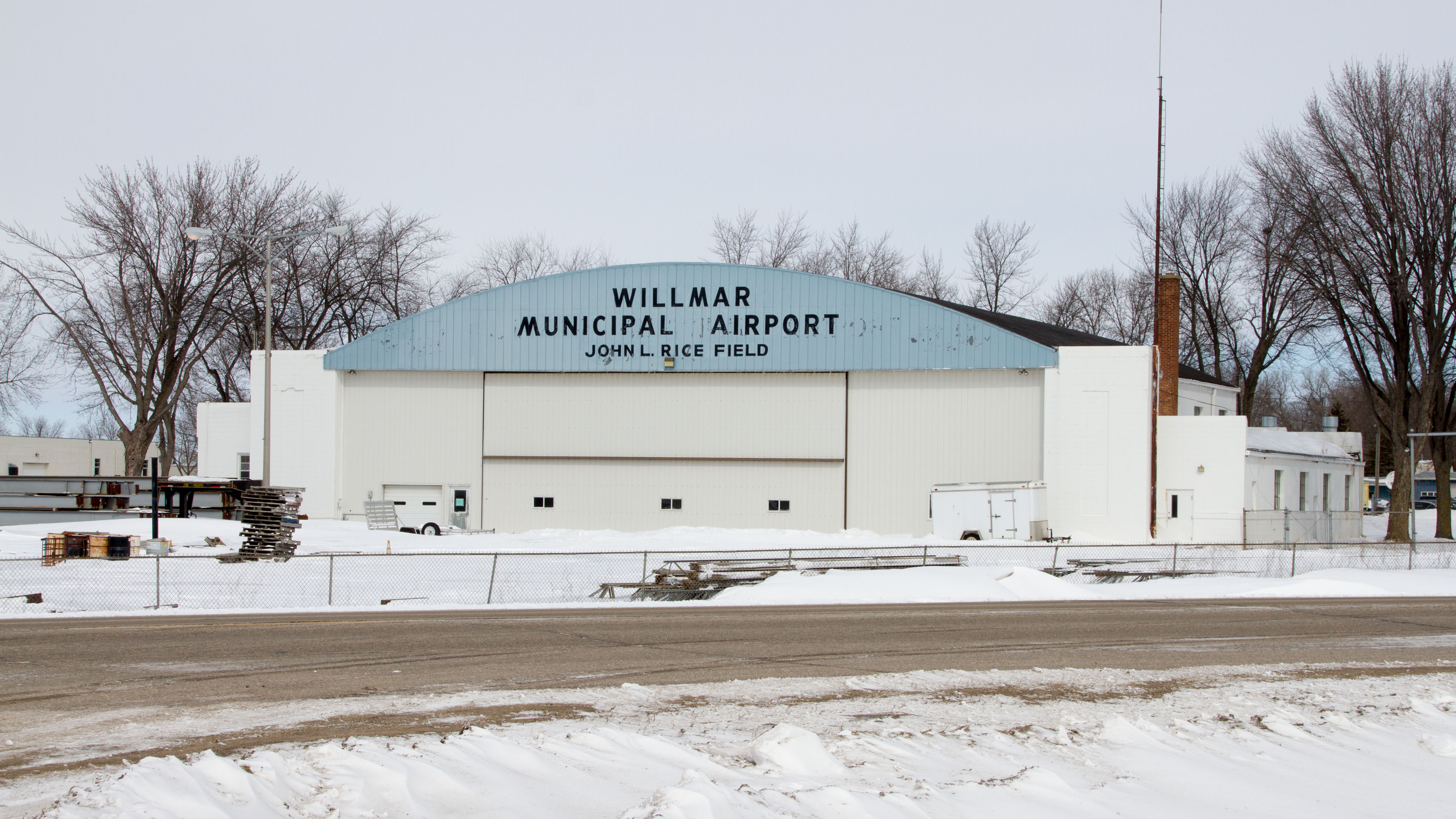
- The site of the former airport
- IATA: ILL; ICAO: KBDH; FAA LID: BDH

Summary
- Airport type: Public
- Owner: City of Willmar
- Serves: Willmar, Minnesota
- Elevation AMSL: 1,126 ft / 343 m
- Coordinates: 45°07′04″N 095°07′50″W

Map
- Location of airport in Minnesota / United States BDH (the United States)

Runways
Direction	Length		Surface
Direction	ft	m	Surface
13/31	5,500	1,676	Asphalt
3/21	3,000	914	Turf
- Source: Federal Aviation Administration

Willmar Municipal Airport (IATA: ILL, ICAO: KBDH, FAA LID: BDH), also known as John L. Rice Field, is a city-owned public-use airport located west of the central business district of Willmar, a city in Kandiyohi County, Minnesota, United States. The airport opened in 2006 and is located two miles west of a closed airport which operated under the same name (IATA: ILL, ICAO: ~~KILL~~, FAA LID: ~~ILL~~).

Although most U.S. airports use the same three-letter location identifier for the FAA and IATA, Willmar Municipal Airport is assigned BDH by the FAA and ILL by IATA; BDH is used by the IATA for Bandar Lengeh Airport in Bandar Lengeh, Iran.

== Facilities and aircraft ==
Willmar Municipal Airport has two runways: 13/31 with a 5,500 x 100 ft. (1,676 x 30 m) asphalt pavement and 3/21 with a 3,000 x 250 ft. (914 x 76 m) turf surface.

== Earlier airport ==
The first Willmar Municipal Airport was established in 1934 as a federal work relief project of the National Youth Administration during the New Deal.

== Historical Scheduled Service ==
- In October 1935 Watertown Airways, Inc offered scheduled service between Minneapolis–St. Paul International Airport and Watertown, South Dakota. This route continued through South Dakota with additional stops in Huron, Pierre, Phillip, Rapid City, and Spearfish. Service was provided using Travel Air high wing cabin monoplanes.
- In December 1972 Mississippi Valley Airlines had scheduled service to Minneapolis–St. Paul International Airport and Alexandria, Minnesota

== See also ==
- List of airports in Minnesota
