= Henning Municipal Airport =

- IATA: none; ICAO: none; FAA LID: 05Y

Summary
- Airport type: Public
- Owner: City of Henning
- Serves: Henning, Minnesota
- Elevation AMSL: 1,455 ft (443 m)
- Coordinates: 46°18′13.86″N 095°26′22.14″W

Map
- Location of airport in Minnesota 05Y (the United States)

Runways
Direction	Length		Surface
Direction	ft	m	Surface
17/35	3,280	1,000	Turf

Statistics
- Aircraft operations (2011): 2,000
- Based aircraft (2016): 11
- Source: Federal Aviation Administration

Henning Municipal Airport (FAA LID: 05Y) is a city-owned public-use airport located one mile south of the central business district of Henning, a city in Otter Tail County, Minnesota, United States.

== Facilities and aircraft ==
Henning Municipal Airport covers an area of 34 acres which contains one runway designated 17/35 with a 3,860 ft × 200 ft (1,177 m × 61 m) turf surface. For the 12-month period ending April 5, 2012, the airport had 2,000 aircraft operations, an average of 38 per week: 100% general aviation. In September 2016, there were 11 aircraft based at this airport: 10 single-engine and 1 helicopter.

== See also ==
- List of airports in Minnesota
