= Maple Lake Municipal Airport =

- IATA: none; ICAO: KMGG; FAA LID: MGG

Summary
- Airport type: Public
- Owner: City of Maple Lake
- Serves: Maple Lake, Minnesota
- Elevation AMSL: 1,028 ft / 313 m
- Coordinates: 45°14′10″N 093°59′08″W

Map
- Location of airport in Minnesota MGG (the United States)

Runways
Direction	Length		Surface
Direction	ft	m	Surface
10/28	2,796	852	Asphalt
4W/22W	8,000	2,438	Water

Statistics (2007)
- Aircraft operations: 20,800
- Based aircraft: 54
- Source: Federal Aviation Administration

Maple Lake Municipal Airport (ICAO: KMGG, FAA LID: MGG) is a city-owned, public-use airport located one nautical mile (2 km) northeast of the central business district of Maple Lake, a city in Wright County, Minnesota, United States. It is located on Maple Lake and is also known as Maple Lake Municipal Airport & Seaplane Base. The current full name is now Maple Lake Municipal - Bill Mavencamp Sr Field.

Although most U.S. airports use the same three-letter location identifier for the FAA and IATA, Maple Lake Municipal Airport is assigned MGG by the FAA but has no designation from the IATA (which assigned MGG to Margarima, Papua New Guinea).

The Maple Lake Flying club was formed in 1965 with the goal of establishing an airport in the city. In June 1967 the airport opened.

== Facilities and aircraft ==
Maple Lake Municipal Airport covers an area of 56 acres (23 ha) at an elevation of 1,028 feet (313 m) above mean sea level. It has one runway designated 10/28 with a 2,796 x 60 ft (852 x 18 m) asphalt surface. It also has one seaplane landing area designated 4W/22W which measures 8,000 x 2,000 ft (2,438 x 610 m).

For the 12-month period ending June 30, 2007, the airport had 20,800 aircraft operations, an average of 56 per day: 91% general aviation, 5% air taxi and 4% military. At that time there were 54 aircraft based at this airport: 76% single-engine, 13% multi-engine and 11% ultralight.

== See also ==
- List of airports in Minnesota
