= Canby Municipal Airport =

Airport in Minnesota, United States

Canby Municipal Airport Myers Field
- IATA: none; ICAO: KCNB; FAA LID: CNB

Summary
- Airport type: Public
- Owner: City of Canby
- Serves: Canby, Minnesota
- Elevation AMSL: 1,194 ft (364 m)
- Coordinates: 44°43′46″N 096°15′58″W

Map
- Location of airport in Minnesota / United States CNB (the United States)

Runways
Direction	Length		Surface
Direction	ft	m	Surface
12/30	4,648	1,417	Asphalt

Statistics
- Aircraft operations (2010): 6,720
- Based aircraft (2017): 35
- Sources: Minnesota DOT, FAA.

Canby Municipal Airport (ICAO: KCNB, FAA LID: CNB), also known as Myers Field, is a public use airport in Yellow Medicine County, Minnesota, United States. It is owned by the City of Canby and located one nautical mile (2 km) north of its central business district. This airport is included in the National Plan of Integrated Airport Systems for 2011–2015, which categorized it as a general aviation facility.

Although many U.S. airports use the same three-letter location identifier for the FAA and IATA, this airport is assigned CNB by the FAA but has no designation from the IATA (which assigned CNB to Coonamble Airport in New South Wales, Australia).

== Facilities and aircraft ==
Myers Field covers an area of 160 acres (65 ha) at an elevation of 1,194 feet (364 m) above mean sea level. It has one runway designated 12/30 with an asphalt surface measuring 4,648 by 75 feet (1,417 x 23 m).

For the 12-month period ending September 1, 2010, the airport had 6,720 general aviation aircraft operations, an average of 18 per day. In March 2017, there were 35 aircraft based at this airport: 30 single-engine and 5 multi-engine.

== See also ==
- List of airports in Minnesota
