= Richard B. Helgeson Airport =

Airport in Minnesota

- IATA: none; ICAO: KWTM; FAA LID: TWM

Summary
- Airport type: Public
- Owner: City of Two Harbors
- Serves: Two Harbors, Minnesota
- Elevation AMSL: 1,073.1 ft / 327 m
- Coordinates: 47°2′56″N 91°44′42″W

Map
- Location of airport in Minnesota / United States TWM (the United States)

Runways
Direction	Length		Surface
Direction	ft	m	Surface
6/24	4,400	1,341	Asphalt
15/33	2,581	787	Turf
- Source: Federal Aviation Administration

Richard B. Helgeson Airport (ICAO: KTWM, FAA LID: TWM) is a public airport located in St. Louis County, Minnesota, United States, 4 nautical miles northwest of Two Harbors, Minnesota.

== History ==
The airport is named after former airport employee and Two Harbors resident Richard Helgeson. In 1992, the airport was named after him to honor his work in the development of the airport.

A new terminal building totaling $1.3 million was completed in the fall of 2025, replacing the original terminal from 1976.

== See also ==
- List of airports in Minnesota
