= Pelican Rapids Municipal Airport =

- IATA: none; ICAO: none; FAA LID: 47Y

Summary
- Airport type: Public
- Owner: City of Pelican Rapids
- Serves: Pelican Rapids, Minnesota
- Elevation AMSL: 1,385 ft / 423 m
- Coordinates: 46°38′29.85″N 096°06′16.21″W

Map
- Location of airport in Minnesota 47Y (the United States)

Runways
Direction	Length		Surface
Direction	ft	m	Surface
15/33	3,260	994	Turf

Statistics (2010)
- Aircraft operations: 2,050
- Based aircraft: 15
- Source: Federal Aviation Administration

Pelican Rapids Municipal Airport (FAA LID: 47Y) is a city-owned public-use airport located four miles north of the central business district of Pelican Rapids, a city in Otter Tail County, Minnesota, United States.

== Facilities and aircraft ==
Pelican Rapids Municipal Airport covers an area of 240 acres which contains one runway designated 15/33 with a 3,260 x 150 ft (994 x 46 m) turf surface. For the 12-month period ending August 31, 2011, the airport had 2,050 aircraft operations, an average of 39 per week: 100% general aviation. At that time there were 15 aircraft based at this airport: 15 single-engine.

== See also ==
- List of airports in Minnesota
