= Wadena Municipal Airport =

- IATA: none; ICAO: KADC; FAA LID: ADC

Summary
- Airport type: Public
- Owner: City of Wadena
- Serves: Wadena, Minnesota
- Elevation AMSL: 1,369 ft / 417 m
- Coordinates: 46°27′01″N 095°12′39″W

Map
- Location of airport in Minnesota/United States ADC (the United States)

Runways
Direction	Length		Surface
Direction	ft	m	Surface
16/34	4,005	1,221	Asphalt

Statistics (2005)
- Aircraft operations: 5,410
- Source: Federal Aviation Administration

Wadena Municipal Airport (ICAO: KADC, FAA LID: ADC) is a public airport located three miles (4.8 km) west of the central business district of Wadena, a city in Otter Tail County, Minnesota, United States. It is owned by the City of Wadena.

Although most U.S. airports use the same three-letter location identifier for the FAA and IATA, Wadena Municipal Airport is assigned ADC by the FAA but has no designation from the IATA (which assigned ADC to Andakombe, Papua New Guinea).

== Facilities and aircraft ==
Wadena Municipal Airport has one asphalt paved runway (16/34) measuring 4,005 ft × 75 ft (1,221 m × 23 m). For the 12-month period ending August 31, 2005, the airport had 5,410 aircraft operations: 99.9% general aviation and 0.1% military.

The Wadena City counsel unanimously accepted a bid for the construction of a turf crosswind runway on June 25, 2020.

=== Cargo ===
Airlines	Destinations
UPS	Minneapolis/St. Paul

== See also ==
- List of airports in Minnesota
