= Lac qui Parle County Airport =

Airport in Minnesota, United States

Lac qui Parle County Airport Bud Frye Field
- IATA: none; ICAO: KDXX; FAA LID: DXX

Summary
- Airport type: Public
- Owner: Cities of Madison & Lac qui Parle County
- Serves: Madison, Minnesota
- Elevation AMSL: 1,083 ft (330 m)
- Coordinates: 44°59′11″N 096°10′40″W

Map
- Location of airport in Minnesota / United States DXX (the United States)

Runways
Direction	Length		Surface
Direction	ft	m	Surface
14/32	3,300	1,006	Asphalt
9/27	3,003	915	Turf

Statistics
- Aircraft operations (2014): 2,160
- Based aircraft (2017): 10
- Sources: FAA and Mn/DOT

Lac qui Parle County Airport (ICAO: KDXX, FAA LID: DXX) is a public use airport in Lac qui Parle County, Minnesota, United States. Also known as Bud Frye Field, it is located two nautical miles (4 km) southeast of the central business district of Madison. The airport opened in 2001 and it is owned by Lac qui Parle County and the cities of Madison and Dawson.

This airport is included in the National Plan of Integrated Airport Systems for 2017–2021, which categorized it as a general aviation facility. Although many U.S. airports use the same three-letter location identifier for the FAA and IATA, this airport is assigned DXX by the FAA but has no designation from the IATA.

== Facilities and aircraft ==
Lac qui Parle County Airport covers an area of 257 acres (104 ha) at an elevation of 1,083 feet (330 m) above mean sea level. It has two runways: 14/32 is 3,300 by 75 feet (1,006 x 23 m) with an asphalt surface and 9/27 is 3,003 by 135 feet (915 x 41 m) with a turf surface.

For the 12-month period ending October 31, 2014, the airport had 2,160 general aviation aircraft operations, an average of 180 per month. In January 2017, there were 10 aircraft based at this airport: 9 single-engine and 1 multi-engine.

== See also ==
- List of airports in Minnesota
