= Redwood Falls Municipal Airport =

- IATA: RWF; ICAO: KRWF; FAA LID: RWF

Summary
- Airport type: Public
- Owner: City of Redwood Falls
- Serves: Redwood Falls, Minnesota
- Elevation AMSL: 1,023.6 ft / 312 m
- Coordinates: 44°32′48.8000″N 095°04′55.2000″W
- Website: https://ci.redwood-falls.mn.us/airport/12

Map
- Location of airport in Minnesota/United States KRWF (the United States)

Runways
Direction	Length		Surface
Direction	ft	m	Surface
12/30	4,001 x 100	1,220 x 30	Asphalt
5/23	2,081 x 200	634 x 61	Turf

Redwood Falls Municipal Airport (IATA: RWF, ICAO: KRWF, FAA LID: RWF) is a city-owned public-use airport located two miles north-east of the city of Redwood Falls, Minnesota in Redwood County.

== Facilities and aircraft ==
Redwood Falls Airport contains two runways, one designated 12/30 with a 4,001 x 100 ft (1,220 x 23 m) asphalt surface, and another designated 5/23 with a 2,081 x 200 ft (634 x 61 m) turf surface.

For the 12-month period ending May 31, 2018, the airport had 9,800 aircraft operations, an average of 26.85 per day: 66% general aviation and 31% transient general aviation, and 3% military air. The airport housed 15 single-engine airplanes, 4 multi-engine airplanes, and 1 helicopter.

== See also ==
- List of airports in Minnesota
