= Winsted Municipal Airport =

US public airport

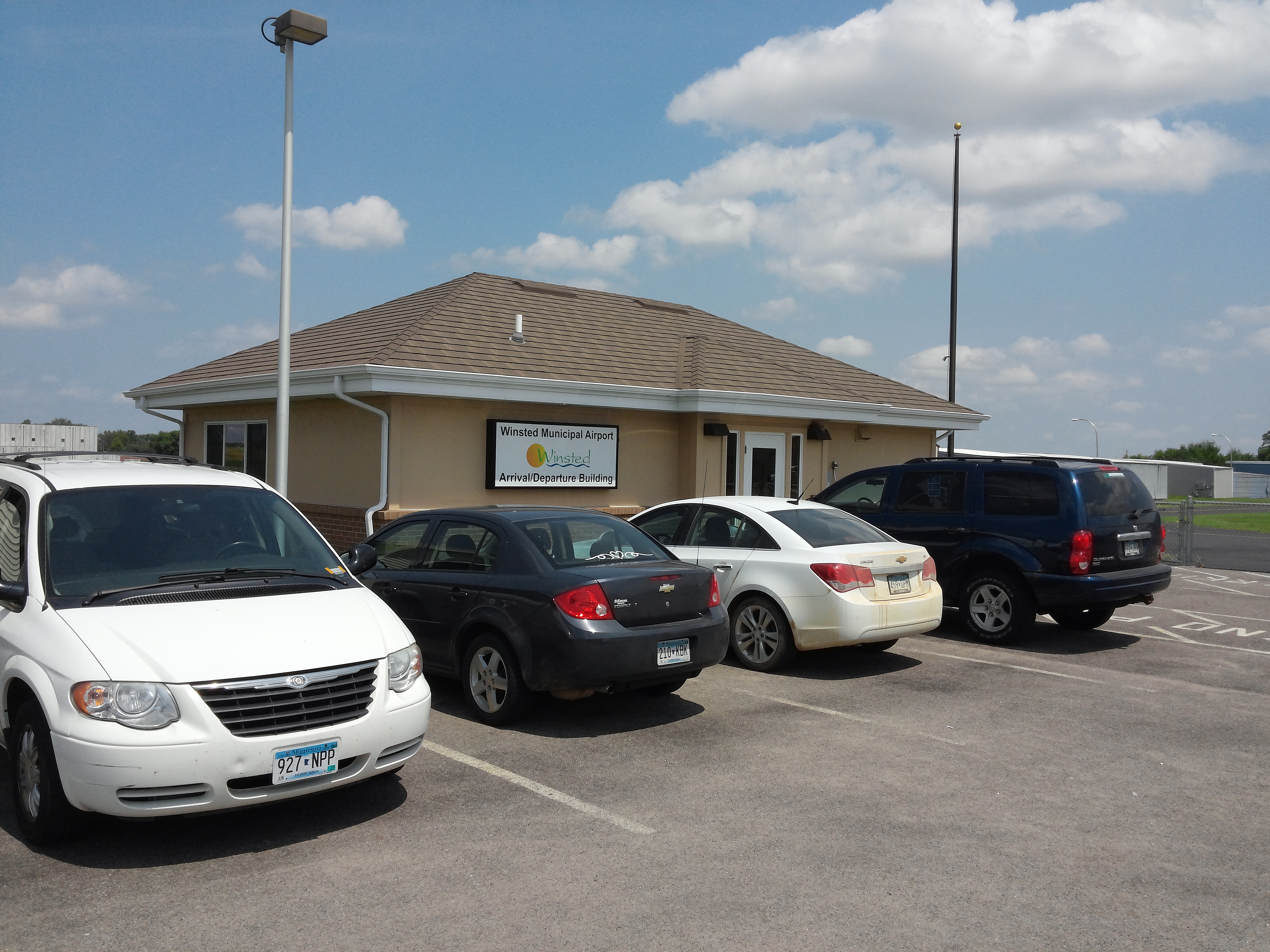
- The airport's arrival/departure building
- IATA: none; ICAO: none; FAA LID: 10D

Summary
- Airport type: Public
- Owner: City of Winsted
- Serves: Winsted, Minnesota
- Elevation AMSL: 1,340 ft / 408.4 m
- Coordinates: 44°56′59.8660″N 094°04′00.9030″W
- Website: winsted.mn.us/airport

Map

Runways
Direction	Length		Surface
Direction	ft	m	Surface
09/27	3,248	990	Turf

Statistics (2021)
- Aircraft operations: 13,545
- Based aircraft: 28
- Source: Federal Aviation Administration

Winsted Municipal Airport (FAA LID: 10D) is a public general aviation airport serving Winsted and the surrounding area in the US state of Minnesota. Operated by the municipal government of Winsted, the airport was opened in 1964. It has a single turf runway, several hangars, and an arrival/departure building. Throughout its history, Winsted Municipal Airport has hosted airshows and the Winstock Country Music Festival. Winsted's city council approved repairs to the runway in 2018.

== History ==
Winsted Municipal Airport was dedicated on August 2, 1964, at an all-day event featuring a speech from U.S. Representative Ancher Nelsen, a United States Air Force flyover, and demonstrations of skydiving, cropdusters, radio-controlled aircraft, and helicopters. The Federal Aviation Administration (FAA) granted the municipal airport commission $16,000 in 1966 to construct an apron and a taxiway, and to develop the land on which the airport is situated.

The airport has a turf runway. Around 2000, the Winsted Airport Commission, which manages the airport's operations, considered paving the runway, which was frequently wet in the spring months, uneven in the summer months, and difficult to plow in the winter months. The City of Winsted intended to pay no more than 20% of the cost of a potential runway repaving.

In 2017, the Winsted City Council voted in favor of a $6.67 million plan to repave the runway but did not agree to use eminent domain to acquire land on the end of the runway for expansion. Due to the lack of agreement, the city council decided instead to repair the turf runway at a cost of $3.37 million. The United States Department of Transportation granted the project $1.44 million to relocate a pipeline running beneath the runway; other federal funds paid for a total of 90% of the project, with the state government covering 5% of the cost and the city covering the final 5%.

== Facilities and events ==
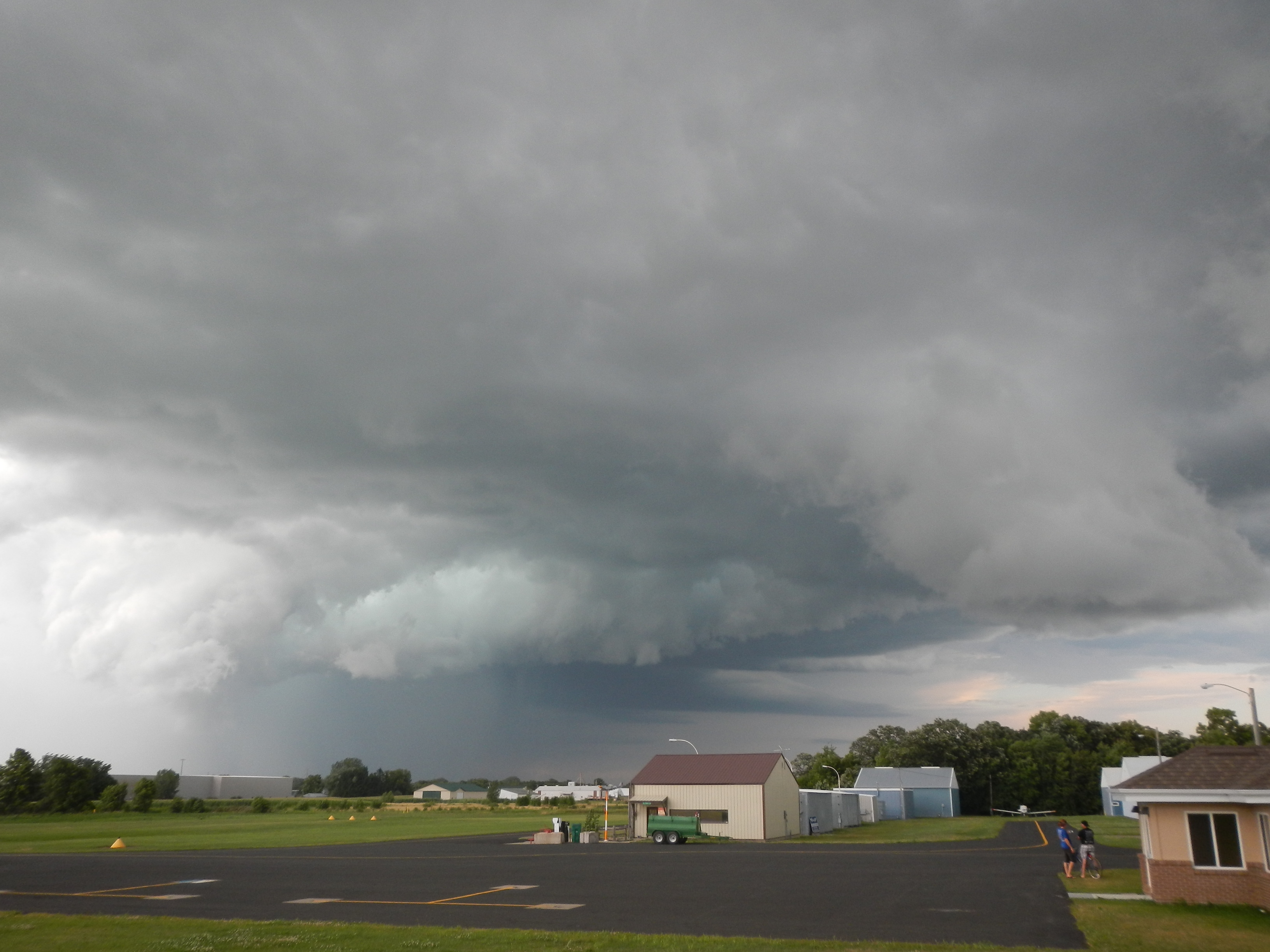
The airport's runway (left), taxiway, and arrival/departure building (right)

The Minnesota Department of Aeronautics considered the airport to be mostly recreational, largely because of its unpaved runway. The airport is located in Winsted near the intersection of McLeod County roads 1 and 5. Its runway, which runs east-west (09/27), is 3,248 feet (990 m) long and 200 feet (61 m) wide with an elevation of 1,340 feet (408.4 m) above sea level. It can accommodate light twin engine and smaller aircraft. As of 2021, 28 aircraft, all single-engines except for one ultralight, were based at Winsted. The airport has a seven-space tee hangar, a 66-unit conventional hangar, a 24-hour arrival/departure building, and a 20-space parking lot. The airport's FAA location identifier is 10D; it has not been assigned an ICAO airport code or an IATA airport code. For the 12-month period ending January 28, 2021, Winsted had 13,545 general aviation operations.

Winsted Municipal Airport has hosted airshows throughout its history. In 1994, the annual Winstock Country Music Festival began to be hosted on the airport's grounds. By 2001, the festival had moved to a plot of land adjacent to the airport. A skydiving company is based out of Winsted Municipal Airport.

== See also ==
- List of airports in Minnesota
