= Moorhead Municipal Airport =

- IATA: none; ICAO: KJKJ; FAA LID: JKJ

Summary
- Airport type: Public
- Owner: City of Moorhead
- Serves: Moorhead, Minnesota
- Elevation AMSL: 918 ft / 279 m
- Coordinates: 46°50′21.4000″N 096°39′50.5000″W

Map
- Location of airport in Minnesota/United States JKJ (the United States)

Runways
Direction	Length		Surface
Direction	ft	m	Surface
12/30	4,500	1,372	Asphalt

Statistics (2010)
- Aircraft operations: 9,000
- Based aircraft: 32
- Source: Federal Aviation Administration

Moorhead Municipal Airport (ICAO: KJKJ, FAA LID: JKJ) is a city-owned public-use airport located in Moorhead, a city in Clay County, Minnesota. It has one runway and, as of 2010, it served general aviation only.

== Facilities and aircraft ==
Moorhead Municipal Airport covers an area of 180 acres which contains one runway designated 12/30 with a 4,300 x 75 ft (1,311 x 23 m) asphalt surface. For the 12-month period ending September 23, 2010, the airport had 9,000 aircraft operations, an average of 25 per day: 100% general aviation. At that time there were 32 aircraft based at this airport: 39 single-engine and 3 multi-engine.

== See also ==
- List of airports in Minnesota
