= Appleton Municipal Airport =

Airport in Appleton, Minnesota, United States

- IATA: none; ICAO: none; FAA LID: AQP

Summary
- Airport type: Public
- Owner: City of Appleton
- Serves: Appleton, Minnesota
- Elevation AMSL: 1,021 ft (311 m)
- Coordinates: 45°13′39″N 096°00′16″W

Map
- Location of airport in Minnesota AQP (the United States)

Runways
Direction	Length		Surface
Direction	ft	m	Surface
13/31	3,500	1,067	Asphalt
4/22	2,770	844	Turf

Statistics
- Aircraft operations (2017): 2,400
- Based aircraft (2019): 12
- Source: Federal Aviation Administration

Appleton Municipal Airport, (IATA: AQP, ICAO: KAQP, FAA LID: 91C) is a public use airport located 2 miles (3 km) northeast of the central business district of Appleton, a city in Swift County, Minnesota, United States. The closest airport with commercial airline service is Watertown Regional Airport about 60 miles (97 km) to the southwest.

Although most airports in the United States use the same three-letter location identifier for the FAA and International Air Transport Association (IATA), this airport is assigned AQP by the FAA but has no designation from the IATA. AQP is assigned to Rodríguez Ballón International Airport by the IATA.

== Facilities and aircraft ==
Appleton Municipal Airport covers an area of 20 acres (8 ha) at an elevation of 1,021 feet (311 m) above mean sea level. It has two runways: 13/31 is 3,500 by 75 feet (1,067 x 23 m) with an asphalt surface, it has an approved GPS approach; 4/22 is 2,770 by 157 feet (844 x 48 m) with an turf surface.

For the 12-month period ending June 30, 2017, the airport had 2,400 aircraft operations, an average of 46 per week: all general aviation. In September 2019, there were 12 aircraft based at this airport: all single-engine.

== See also ==
- List of airports in Minnesota
