= Ely Municipal Airport =

Coordinates: 47°49′28″N 091°49′51″W

- IATA: LYU; ICAO: KELO; FAA LID: ELO

Summary
- Airport type: Public
- Owner: City of Ely
- Serves: Ely, Minnesota
- Elevation AMSL: 1,456 ft (444 m)

Map

Runways
Direction	Length		Surface
Direction	ft	m	Surface
12/30	5,596	1,706	Asphalt

Statistics
- Aircraft operations (2014): 8,200
- Based aircraft (2017): 14
- Source: Federal Aviation Administration

Ely Municipal Airport (IATA: LYU, ICAO: KELO, FAA LID: ELO) is a public airport located in Saint Louis County, Minnesota, United States, four miles south of the city of Ely, which owns the airport.

Most U.S. airports use the same three-letter location identifier for the FAA and IATA, but Ely Municipal Airport is ELO to the FAA and LYU to the IATA (Eldorado, Misiones, Argentina has IATA code ELO).

== Facilities ==
The airport covers 560 acres (230 ha); has one runway, 12/30, which is 5,596 x 100 ft (1,706 x 30 m) with an asphalt surface.

For the year ending May 31, 2014 the airport had 8,200 aircraft operations, an average of 22 per day: 98% general aviation and 2% air taxi.

In January 2017, there were 14 aircraft based at this airport: 13 single-engine and 1 multi-engine.

== Past airline service ==
From 1995 through 2002 Mesaba Airlines, operating as Northwest Airlink on behalf of Northwest Airlines, provided services between Ely and Minneapolis/Saint Paul during the summer months. The once daily flight was operated with a Saab 340 aircraft.

== See also ==
- List of airports in Minnesota
