= Roseau Municipal Airport =

Airport in United States of America

Coordinates: 48°51′26″N 095°41′53″W

Roseau Municipal Airport Rudy Billberg Field (IATA: ROX, ICAO: KROX) is a public and general transportation airport 2 mi (3.2 km) east of Roseau, Minnesota, city limits on Minnesota State Highway 11. The airport has a single paved runway 16/34 (4,401 ft × 75 ft, 1,341 m × 23 m) as well as a grass strip 06/24 (2,505 ft × 250 ft, 764 m × 76 m).

As of October 21, 2015, local residents were given access to the Valley Med Flight network. Residents seeking immediate emergency care within 150 miles (240 km) of the airport can use the air ambulance service.

== History ==
State records show the original Roseau Airport was graded and lighted in 1947. In 1962, the airport was relocated to its current site. According to FAA records ROX was activated in September 1962 for civil public use which corresponds to the time the runway and apron were paved. The airport was originally constructed with a paved and lighted 3,700 ft (1,100 m) runway to serve the community. The runway was extended by 200 ft (60 m) in 1975 and extended further to 4,400 ft (1,300 m) in 1990.

In 1999, the airport was renamed Roseau Municipal Airport/Rudy Billberg Field. Rudy Billberg was a Roseau native and a 1998 inductee to the Minnesota Aviation Hall of Fame. Billberg, a commercial pilot and outdoorsman, was one of the state's first flight examiners. He flew commercially for 40 years in Minnesota and Alaska. He was a Northwest Airlines captain and flew B-25 air fire tankers in Alaska. Billberg died in 2007.

The airport received about $488,000 in federal funding to improve the taxiway areas in 2011.

== See also ==
- List of airports in Minnesota
