= Northwest Angle Airport =

- IATA: none; ICAO: none; FAA LID: ~~58MN~~

Summary
- Airport type: Private
- Owner: Lehr & Davis Properties
- Serves: Angle Inlet, Minnesota
- Elevation AMSL: 1,071 ft / 326 m
- Coordinates: 49°21′4.99″N 095°04′15.86″W
- Interactive map of Northwest Angle Airport

Runways
Direction	Length		Surface
Direction	ft	m	Surface
8/26	2,380	715	Turf

Statistics (1979)
- Aircraft operations: 400
- Based aircraft: 0
- Source: Federal Aviation Administration

Northwest Angle Airport (FAA LID: ~~58MN~~) is a privately owned, private-use airport located in Angle Inlet, a township in Lake of the Woods County, Minnesota, United States. It is the northernmost airport in the contiguous United States.

== Facilities and aircraft ==
Northwest Angle Airport covers an area of 18 acres which contains a runway designated 8/26 with a 2,380 x 105 ft (715 x 32 m) turf surface. For the 12-month period ending August 3, 1979, the airport had 400 aircraft operations, an average of 33 per month: 100% general aviation. At that time there weren't any aircraft based at this airport.

== History ==
The airport was built as part of a resort in 1965 by Norman Carlson. In 1995 the airport was closed to public use due to liability concerns. In 2012 a preliminary airport feasibility study was conducted to determine whether there was demand for a new public airport. A second airport feasibility study identified six possible sites for a public airport including the existing airport. Three potential sites were found potentially economically, aeronautically, and environmentally feasible. A third airport feasibility study completed additional tasks to refine estimated costs for a proposed airport.

Lake of the Woods County Commissioners on June 16, 2015 selected a site one to 1.5 miles southeast of downtown Angle Inlet to build a new airport that will open the remote area of northern Minnesota to general aviation. The airport feasibility studies refer to this location as site 3.
