= Springfield Municipal Airport (Minnesota) =

- IATA: none; ICAO: none; FAA LID: D42

Summary
- Airport type: Public
- Owner: City of Springfield
- Serves: Springfield, Minnesota
- Elevation AMSL: 1,072 ft / 327 m
- Coordinates: 44°13′52″N 094°59′56″W

Map
- Location of airport in Minnesota / United States D42 (the United States)

Runways
Direction	Length		Surface
Direction	ft	m	Surface
13/31	3,402	1,037	Asphalt

Statistics
- Aircraft operations (2014): 2,420
- Based aircraft (2017): 4
- Source: Federal Aviation Administration

Springfield Municipal Airport (FAA LID: D42) is a city-owned public-use airport located one nautical mile (2 km) southwest of the central business district of Springfield, a city in Brown County, Minnesota, United States. It is included in the National Plan of Integrated Airport Systems for 2017–2021, which categorized it as a general aviation facility.

== Facilities and aircraft ==
Springfield Municipal Airport covers an area of 118 acres (48 ha) at an elevation of 1,072 feet (327 m) above mean sea level. It has one runway designated 13/31 with an asphalt surface measuring 3,402 by 75 feet (1,037 x 23 m).

In 1933 the city received funding from the Works Progress Administration to purchase an 80-acre site to develop an airport with a turf runway. The original airport opened in 1935.

On May 5, 1973, ground was broken for the current airport. The new airport was close enough to the original airport for airplanes to taxi by a road to the new facility. A dedication ceremony was held on July 28, 1974, for the new airport.

For the 12-month period ending September 30, 2014, the airport had 2,420 general aviation aircraft operations, an average of 201 per month. In March 2017, there were 4 aircraft based at this airport; all 4 single-engine.

== See also ==
- List of airports in Minnesota
