= Mississippi Valley Airlines =

US regional airline (1968–1985) merged into Air Wisconsin

IATA	ICAO	Call sign
XV	MVA	VALAIR
- Commenced operations: July 22, 1968; 58 years ago
- Ceased operations: 1985; 41 years ago
- Operating bases: La Crosse Municipal Airport
- Fleet size: See Fleet below
- Destinations: See Destinations below
- Headquarters: La Crosse, Wisconsin, United States; Moline, Illinois, United States

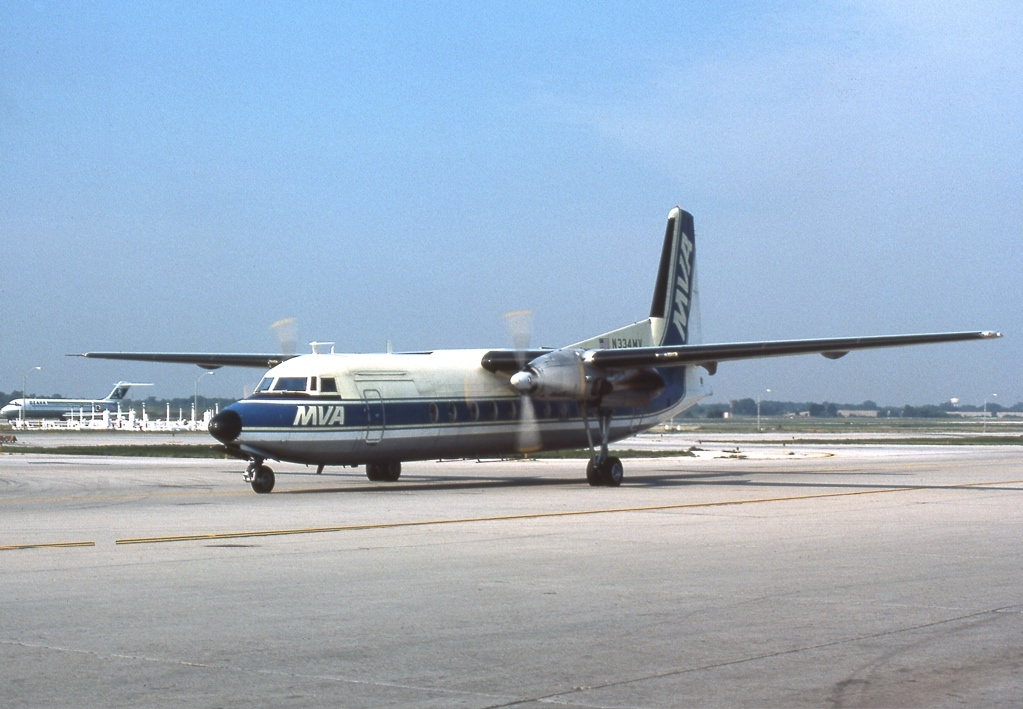
F-27 Chicago 1984

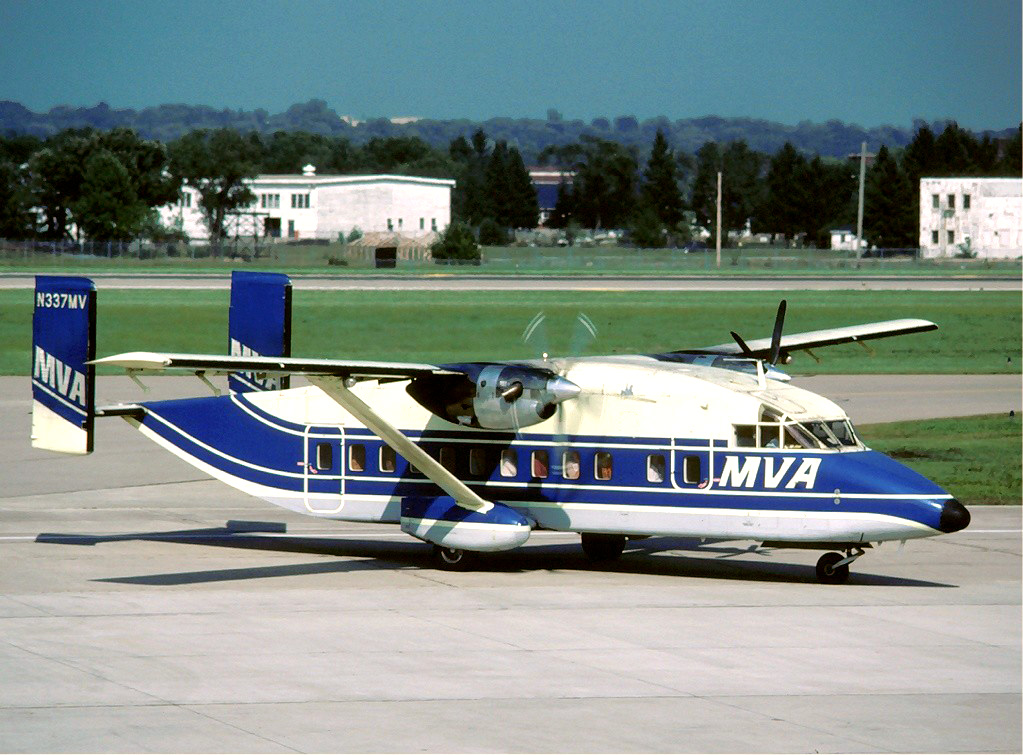
Shorts 330 Minneapolis 1985

Mississippi Valley Airlines (IATA--XV) was a regional air carrier serving the Upper Midwestern region of the United States. It was founded by Herb Lee, Norm Elsy and Charles A. ("Chuck") Draine as Gateway Aviation, and had its headquarters in La Crosse, Wisconsin. Chuck Draine served as chairman and chief executive officer. It began scheduled flight operations on July 22, 1968 between La Crosse Municipal Airport and both Chicago (O'Hare International Airport) and Milwaukee (General Mitchell International Airport). The carrier changed its name to Mississippi Valley Airways in October 1969. It became Mississippi Valley Airlines (MVA) and moved its headquarters to Quad City Airport in Moline, Illinois, in January 1982. The airline merged into Air Wisconsin on May 17, 1985 in a $10 million share exchange transaction. At the time of the merger, Mississippi Valley Airlines was the United States' eighth-largest regional airline in terms of ridership.

== Destinations ==
Mississippi Airlines had the following destinations:

- Alexandria, Minnesota
- Benton Harbor, Michigan
- Burlington, Iowa
- Cedar Rapids, Iowa
- Champaign-Urbana, Illinois
- Chicago, Illinois (O'Hare)
- Clinton, Iowa
- Columbia, Missouri
- Dubuque, Iowa
- Kansas City, Missouri
- La Crosse, Wisconsin
- Lincoln, Nebraska
- Madison, Wisconsin
- Marshall, Minnesota
- Mason City, Iowa
- Milwaukee, Wisconsin
- Minneapolis, Minnesota
- Moline, Illinois
- Omaha, Nebraska
- Oshkosh, Wisconsin
- Ottumwa, Iowa
- Peoria, Illinois
- Prairie du Chien, Wisconsin
- St. Louis, Missouri
- Springfield, Illinois
- Willmar, Minnesota
- Winona, Minnesota

== Turboprop fleet ==
- Beechcraft Model 99
- de Havilland Canada DHC-6 Twin Otter
- Fokker F27
- Short 330
- Short 360
- Swearingen SA-226TC Metroliner

== Accidents ==
Although the airline had no fatal accidents, it lost one aircraft during in-flight operations, a Twin Otter which hit trees upon landing at La Crosse, Wisconsin.

== See also ==
- List of defunct airlines of the United States
