= Isle Private Airport =

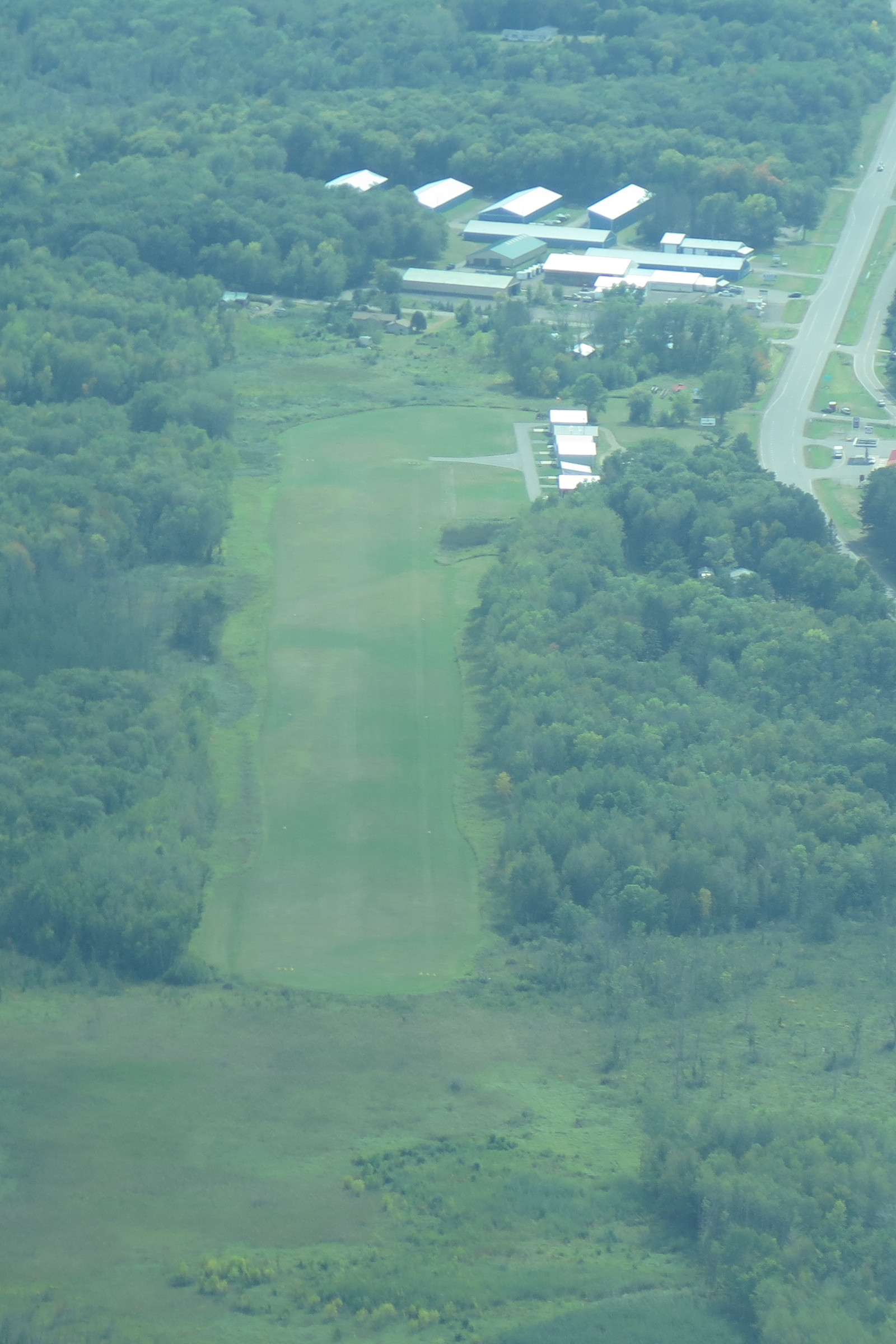
- IATA: none; ICAO: none; FAA LID: MY72

Summary
- Airport type: Private use
- Owner/Operator: City of Isle
- Serves: Isle, Minnesota
- Opened: July 1, 1956
- Elevation AMSL: 1,271 ft (387 m)
- Coordinates: 46°09′34.837″N 093°27′40.851″W

Map
- Location of airport in Minnesota/United States MY72 (the United States)

Runways
Direction	Length		Surface
Direction	ft	m	Surface
16/34	2,460	750	Turf

Statistics (2016)
- Aircraft operations: 600/year
- Based aircraft: 4
- Source: Federal Aviation Administration

Isle Private Airport (FAA LID: MY72) is a city-owned private-use airport located two miles north east of the central business district of Isle, a city in Mille Lacs County, Minnesota, United States. It is notable that the airport is publicly owned but private-use only. The airport was previously known as Isle Municipal Airport. Isle is the only city on Mille Lacs Lake with a functioning airport.

Pilots flying into the Isle Private Airport must be members of the Isle Airport Association, formerly known as the Isle Flying Club, or have permission from a current member. In 2018 the organization reported it had 98 members. Interest in the airport has grown; in 2020 the Isle Airport Association had more than 200 members.

The Isle Airport Association sponsors an annual fly-in breakfast in July.

== Facilities and aircraft ==
Isle Private Airport covers an area of 35 acres (14 ha) which contains one runway designated 16/34 with a 2,460 by 160 feet (750 m × 49 m) turf surface. For the 12-month period ending June 30, 2016, the airport had 600 aircraft operations: 100% general aviation. At that time there were 4 aircraft based at this airport.

== History ==
In 1954 the state of Minnesota deeded vacated land to the Village of Isle to be used exclusively for an airport. Construction began in 1955. The FAA lists the opening date of the airport as July 1, 1956. The Isle Airport received its first public use license at that time.

In 1967 the Isle Flying Club was incorporated to maintain, operate, and improve the airport. The airport was public use at this time and received public funding. Maintenance tasks such as mowing and plowing were performed by the city.

In the early 1980s the airport lost its Minnesota Department of Transportation/Aeronautics public-use status due to new runway length rules and tall tree interference. The Isle Flying Club obtained a private use license to allow the airport to remain open.

In 2014 the City of Isle established an airport commission to move forward with plans to improve the airport and return it to public-use status.

In 2019 the Minnesota Department of Transportation Office of Aeronautics threatened to close the airport unless trees on the south end of the airport were removed. If trees obstructing the runway were removed, the airport would be eligible for state grant funds and could regain public use status. On March 4, 2020, the Aircraft Owners and Pilots Association, the Recreational Aviation Foundation, the Minnesota Pilots Association, and the Isle Airport Association sponsored a town hall meeting to discuss the fate of the airport and its value to the community.

On June 9, 2020, the Isle City Council approved a five-year lease to keep the airport open as a private airport. The Isle Airport Association would take responsibility to remove trees that were obstructing the south end of the airport. The Minnesota Department of Transportation Office of Aeronautics stated that the required easement clearing would also require removing the homes in order to meet public airport status.

In November 2020, the Recreational Aviation Foundation granted $14,000 towards the preservation of the airport. The funds will be used to remove encroaching trees that were threatening to close the airport.
