= Fairmont Municipal Airport (Minnesota) =

- IATA: FRM; ICAO: KFRM; FAA LID: FRM

Summary
- Airport type: Public
- Owner: City of Fairmont
- Serves: Fairmont, Minnesota
- Elevation AMSL: 1,162 ft (354 m)
- Coordinates: 43°38′38″N 094°24′56″W

Map
- Location of airport in Minnesota/United States FRM (the United States)

Runways
Direction	Length		Surface
Direction	ft	m	Surface
13/31	5,505	1,678	Asphalt
2/20	3,300	1,006	Asphalt

Statistics (2008)
- Aircraft operations: 9,400
- Based aircraft: 30
- Source: Federal Aviation Administration

Fairmont Municipal Airport (IATA: FRM, ICAO: KFRM, FAA LID: FRM) is a city-owned public-use airport located two nautical miles (3.7 km) southeast of the central business district of Fairmont, a city in Martin County, Minnesota, United States.

The airport at this location was dedicated in 1951.

== Facilities and aircraft ==
Fairmont Municipal Airport covers an area of 229 acres (93 ha) at an elevation of 1,162 feet (354 m) above mean sea level. It has two asphalt paved runways: 13/31 is 5,505 by 100 feet (1,678 by 30 m) and 2/20 is 3,300 by 75 feet (1,006 by 23 m).

For the 12-month period ending May 30, 2008, the airport had 9,400 aircraft operations, an average of 25 per day: 91% general aviation, 7% air taxi and 1% military. At that time there were 30 aircraft based at this airport: 83% single-engine, 10% multi-engine, 3% jet and 3% ultralight.

== History ==
In 1959 North Central Airlines began scheduled service using Douglas DC-3 aircraft. The flight route was from Minneapolis–St. Paul International Airport, Mankato, Fairmont, Worthington, and Sioux Falls, SD. Scheduled service by various commuter airlines continued until 1996.

== See also ==
- List of airports in Minnesota
