= Marty's Tranquility Base =

Marty's Tranquility Base (Seaplane Base)
- IATA: none; ICAO: none; FAA LID: MN76

Summary
- Airport type: Public
- Owner: C. M. Coddington
- Serves: Prior Lake, Minnesota
- Elevation AMSL: 911 ft / 278 m
- Coordinates: 44°41′59″N 093°28′19″W
- Interactive map of Marty's Tranquility Base (Seaplane Base)

Runways
| Direction | Length | | Surface |
| Direction | ft | m | Surface |
|---|---|---|---|
| 8W/26W | 8,100 | 2,469 | Water |
- Source: Federal Aviation Administration

Marty's Tranquility Base (FAA LID: MN76) is a privately owned, public-use seaplane base located two nautical miles (3.7 km; 2.3 mi) southwest of the central business district of Prior Lake, Minnesota, United States.

== Facilities and aircraft ==
Marty's Tranquility Base covers an area of 1 acre (0.40 ha) at an elevation of 911 feet (278 m) above mean sea level. It has one landing area designated 8W/26W which measures 8,100 by 300 feet (2,469 m × 91 m).
