= Litchfield Municipal Airport (Minnesota) =

- IATA: none; ICAO: KLJF; FAA LID: LJF

Summary
- Airport type: Public
- Owner: City of Litchfield
- Serves: Litchfield, Minnesota
- Elevation AMSL: 1,140 ft (350 m)
- Coordinates: 45°05′50″N 094°30′26″W

Map
- Location of airport in Minnesota / United States LJF (the United States)

Runways
Direction	Length		Surface
Direction	ft	m	Surface
13/31	4,002	1,220	Asphalt

Statistics
- Aircraft operations (2016): 7,000
- Based aircraft (2017): 26
- Sources: Minnesota DOT, FAA

Litchfield Municipal Airport (ICAO: KLJF, FAA LID: LJF) is a city-owned public-use airport located two nautical miles (3.7 km) southeast of the central business district of Litchfield, a city in Meeker County, Minnesota, United States. The airport at this location opened in 1987. The original Litchfield Airport was closer to town and was located near the County Fair Grounds.

Although most U.S. airports use the same three-letter location identifier for the FAA and IATA, this airport is assigned LJF by the FAA but has no designation from the IATA.

== Facilities and aircraft ==
Litchfield Municipal Airport covers an area of 378 acres (153 ha) at an elevation of 1,140 feet (347 m) above mean sea level. It has one runway designated 13/31 with an asphalt surface measuring 4,002 by 100 feet (1,220 x 30 m).

For the 12-month period ending July 30, 2016, the airport had 7,000 aircraft operations, an average of 19 per day: 86% general aviation and 14% air taxi. In March 2017, there were 26 aircraft based at this airport: 24 single-engine, 1 multi-engine and 1 ultralight.

== History ==
Two brothers, Clarence and Elmer Hinck were two Minnesota Aviation pioneers that grew up in Litchfield. Clarence Hinck was one of the founders of Federated Flyers, Minnesota's first commercial flying service. Federated was known for its barnstorming and flight school. Elmer Hinck eventually joined his brother at Federated Flying Service. During World War II the company provided flight training services. Both brothers have been inducted into the Minnesota Aviation Hall of Fame.

== See also ==
- List of airports in Minnesota
