= Grygla, Minnesota =

City in Minnesota, United States

Grygla
- City
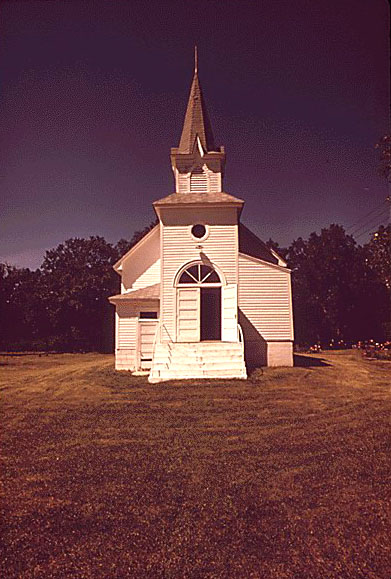
- St. Petrie Lutheran church in 1973

- Location of Grygla, Minnesota
- Coordinates: 48°17′59″N 95°37′12″W
- Country: United States
- State: Minnesota
- County: Marshall

Area
  - Total: 0.58 sq mi (1.50 km^{2})
  - Land: 0.58 sq mi (1.50 km^{2})
  - Water: 0 sq mi (0.00 km^{2})
- Elevation: 1,178 ft (359 m)

Population (2020)
  - Total: 180
  - Density: 311.5/sq mi (120.28/km^{2})
- Time zone: UTC-6 (CST)
  - Summer (DST): UTC-5 (CDT)
- ZIP code: 56727
- Area code: 218
- FIPS code: 27-26216
- GNIS feature ID: 0644516
- Website: https://grygla.govoffice2.com/

Grygla (/ˈɡrɪɡlə/ GRIG-lə) is a city in Valley Township of Marshall County, Minnesota, United States. The population was 180 at the 2020 census.

== Geography ==
According to the United States Census Bureau, the city has a total area of 0.57 square miles (1.48 km^{2}), all land.

State Highway 89 and County Road 54 are two of the main routes in the community. State Highway 1 and State Highway 219 are nearby.

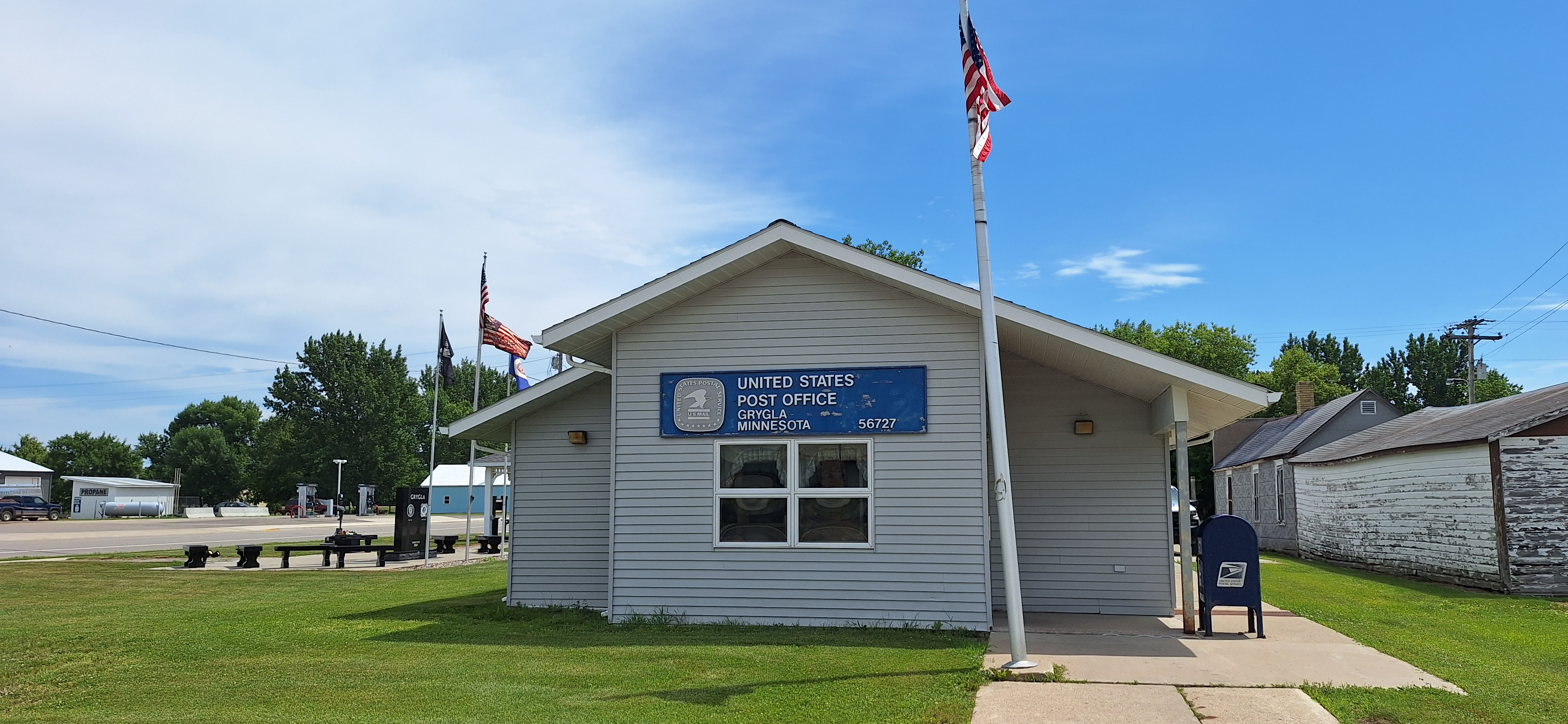
Post office in Grygla

== Demographics ==
Historical population
Census	Pop.	Note	%±
1920	155		—
1930	147		−5.2%
1940	183		24.5%
1950	216		18.0%
1960	192		−11.1%
1970	211		9.9%
1980	216		2.4%
1990	220		1.9%
2000	228		3.6%
2010	221		−3.1%
2020	180		−18.6%
U.S. Decennial Census; 2020 Census

=== 2010 census ===
As of the census of 2010, there were 221 people, 110 households, and 64 families living in the city. The population density was 387.7 inhabitants per square mile (149.7/km^{2}). There were 131 housing units at an average density of 229.8 per square mile (88.7/km^{2}). The racial makeup of the city was 99.1% White, 0.5% Native American, and 0.5% from two or more races.

There were 110 households, of which 25.5% had children under the age of 18 living with them, 39.1% were married couples living together, 17.3% had a female householder with no husband present, 1.8% had a male householder with no wife present, and 41.8% were non-families. 37.3% of all households were made up of individuals, and 20% had someone living alone who was 65 years of age or older. The average household size was 2.01 and the average family size was 2.64.

The median age in the city was 45.5 years. 20.4% of residents were under the age of 18; 7.1% were between the ages of 18 and 24; 22.2% were from 25 to 44; 28.9% were from 45 to 64; and 21.3% were 65 years of age or older. The gender makeup of the city was 46.6% male and 53.4% female.

=== 2000 census ===
As of the census of 2000, there were 228 people, 115 households, and 57 families living in the city. The population density was 363.8 inhabitants per square mile (140.5/km^{2}). There were 128 housing units at an average density of 204.2 per square mile (78.8/km^{2}). The racial makeup of the city was 98.25% White, 0.88% Asian, and 0.88% from two or more races. Hispanic or Latino of any race were 0.44% of the population.

There were 115 households, out of which 25.2% had children under the age of 18 living with them, 37.4% were married couples living together, 7.8% had a female householder with no husband present, and 49.6% were non-families. 47.8% of all households were made up of individuals, and 27.0% had someone living alone who was 65 years of age or older. The average household size was 1.98 and the average family size was 2.81.

In the city, the population was spread out, with 23.2% under the age of 18, 3.9% from 18 to 24, 25.9% from 25 to 44, 18.0% from 45 to 64, and 28.9% who were 65 years of age or older. The median age was 44 years. For every 100 females, there were 103.6 males. For every 100 females age 18 and over, there were 98.9 males.

The median income for a household in the city was $25,625, and the median income for a family was $32,500. Males had a median income of $30,000 versus $20,625 for females. The per capita income for the city was $14,635. About 15.2% of families and 17.7% of the population were below the poverty line, including 24.6% of those under the age of eighteen and 18.4% of those 65 or over.

== Controversy over area elk ==
A herd of elk managed by the Minnesota Department of Natural Resources lives near Grygla. The herd has generated much controversy over the years as herd numbers grew and the animals damaged farmers’ crops. In 1985, farmers successfully lobbied to have the elk removed, an effort that was eventually halted. In 1987, the legislature voted to compensate farmers for crop damage and limit the elk herd to between 20 and 30 animals, through public hunting seasons if necessary. The last hunt was in 1998.

== Notable people ==
Nearby Gatzke resident Jeremy Hernandez was honored on August 15, 2007, for his role in rescuing dozens of children on a school bus trapped in the rubble of the I-35W Bridge in Minneapolis. Thief River Falls Radio reported that the 20-year-old and three others were with the bus the day the I-35W Bridge collapsed at 6:05pm on Wednesday, August 1, 2007.

Sherry “Pebs” Dalager (née Peterson), Grygla high school class of 1982, won First Place for Storytelling in the 1982 Minnesota State Speech Competition.

== Transport ==
The city owns and operates the Grygla Municipal Airport, which opened in 2002.
