= Staples Municipal Airport =

- IATA: none; ICAO: KSAZ; FAA LID: SAZ

Summary
- Owner: City of Staples
- Serves: Staples, Minnesota
- Opened: October 1, 1946
- Elevation AMSL: 1,288 ft / 393 m
- Coordinates: 46°22′51.166″N 094°48′23.766″W
- Website: Staples Airport Board

Map
- Location of airport in Minnesota/United States SAZ (the United States)

Runways
| Direction | Length | | Surface |
| Direction | ft | m | Surface |
|---|---|---|---|
| 14/32 | 3,305 x 75 | 1,007 x 23 | asphalt |

Statistics (2019)
- Aircraft operations local: 6600
- Aircraft operations itinerant: 3300
- Based aircraft: 18
- Sources:FAA

Staples Municipal Airport (ICAO: KSAZ, FAA LID: SAZ) is a city-owned public-use airport located two nautical miles (3.7 km) northwest of the central business district of the City of Staples, in Wadena County, Minnesota, United States.

== Facilities and aircraft ==
Staples Municipal Airport covers an area of 172 acres (70 ha) at an elevation of 1,288 feet (393 m) above mean sea level. It has one runway designated 14/32 with an asphalt surface measuring 3,305 by 75 feet (1007 x 23 m).

In 2010 the Arrival-Departure Building was remodeled.

== History ==
In 2020 the airport received a $30,000 CARES Act award.

== See also ==
- List of airports in Minnesota
