= Waseca Municipal Airport =

- IATA: none; ICAO: KACQ; FAA LID: ACQ

Summary
- Airport type: Public
- Owner: City of Waseca
- Serves: Waseca, Minnesota
- Elevation AMSL: 1,126 ft / 343 m
- Coordinates: 44°04′24″N 093°33′11″W

Map
- Location of airport in Minnesota/United States ACQ (the United States)

Runways
Direction	Length		Surface
Direction	ft	m	Surface
15/33	3,399	1,036	Asphalt

Statistics (2017)
- Aircraft operations (year ending 7/31/2017): 17,190
- Source: Federal Aviation Administration

Waseca Municipal Airport (ICAO: KACQ, FAA LID: ACQ) is a public airport located two miles (3 km) west of the central business district of Waseca, in Waseca County, Minnesota, United States. It is owned by the City of Waseca.

Waseca's first airport was located south of the city and was built in the 1930s. This airport was sold to a private owner and eventually closed. The current airport is two miles west of the city and opened in 1969 with a turf runway and an aircraft parking apron. The Arrivals and Departures building was opened in 1972. The runway was paved and lighted in 1975.

Although most U.S. airports use the same three-letter location identifier for the FAA and IATA, Waseca Municipal Airport is assigned ACQ by the FAA but has no designation from the IATA.

== Facilities and aircraft ==
Waseca Municipal Airport covers an area of 309 acres (125 ha) which contains one asphalt paved runway (15/33) measuring 3,399 x 75 ft (1,036 x 23 m). For the 12-month period ending July 31, 2017, the airport had 17,190 aircraft operations, an average of 47 per day, 100% of which were general aviation.

== See also ==
- List of airports in Minnesota
