= Little Falls/Morrison County Airport =

Little Falls/Morrison County Airport Lindbergh Field
- IATA: none; ICAO: KLXL; FAA LID: LXL

Summary
- Airport type: Public
- Owner: City of Little Falls & Morrison County
- Serves: Little Falls, Minnesota
- Elevation AMSL: 1,122 ft (342 m)
- Coordinates: 45°56′59″N 094°20′51″W

Map
- Location of airport in Minnesota/United States LXL (the United States)

Runways
Direction	Length		Surface
Direction	ft	m	Surface
13/31	4,000	1,219	Asphalt
18/36	2,858	871	Asphalt

Statistics (2016)
- Aircraft operations: 22,265
- Based aircraft: 25
- Source: Federal Aviation Administration

Little Falls/Morrison County Airport (ICAO: KLXL, FAA LID: LXL), also known as Lindbergh Field, is a public airport located two miles (3 km) south of the central business district of Little Falls, a city in Morrison County, Minnesota, United States. It is owned by the City of Little Falls and Morrison County.

The airport opened in May 1947 as the Little Falls Municipal Airport. In 1964, the city and Morrison County signed a joint powers agreement and changed its name to the Little Falls/Morrison County Airport. A newer terminal building was erected in 1996.

Although most U.S. airports use the same three-letter location identifier for the FAA and IATA, Little Falls/Morrison County Airport is assigned LXL by the FAA but has no designation from the IATA.

On July 9, 2019 A FAA Airport Improvement Program grant of $371,724 was announced to construct a taxiway. On November 22, 2019, the Federal Aviation Administration announced it had awarded an Airport Improvement Program grant of $2.1 million to the Little Falls/Morrison County Airport-Lindbergh Field to construct a new runway.

== Facilities and aircraft ==
Little Falls/Morrison County Airport covers an area of 290 acres (120 ha) which contains two runways: 13/31 with a 4,000 x 75 ft (1,219 x 23 m) asphalt pavement and 18/36 with a 2,890 x 170 ft (881 x 52 m) turf surface.

For the 12-month period ending August 31, 2006, the airport had 22,450 aircraft operations, an average of 61 per day: 98% general aviation, 2% air taxi and <1% military. At that time there were 43 aircraft based at this airport: 96% single-engine, 2% helicopter and 2% ultralight.

== See also ==
- List of airports in Minnesota
