= Tracy Municipal Airport (Minnesota) =

- IATA: none; ICAO: KTKC; FAA LID: TKC

Summary
- Airport type: Public
- Owner: City of Tracy
- Serves: Tracy, Minnesota
- Elevation AMSL: 1,340 ft / 408.4 m
- Coordinates: 44°14′56.81″N 095°36′26.14″W

Map
- Location of airport in Minnesota/United States TKC (the United States)

Runways
Direction	Length		Surface
Direction	ft	m	Surface
11/29	3,100	945	Asphalt
6/24	2,590	789	Turf
17/35	1,825	556	Turf

Statistics (2010)
- Aircraft operations: 3,040
- Based aircraft: 6
- Source: Federal Aviation Administration

Tracy Municipal Airport (ICAO: KTKC, FAA LID: TKC) is a city-owned public-use airport located one mile northeast of the central business district of Tracy, a city in Lyon County, Minnesota, United States.

== Facilities and aircraft ==
Tracy Municipal Airport covers an area of 440 acres (1.8 km^{2}) which contains three runway designated 11/29 with a 3,100 ft × 75 ft (945 m × 23 m) asphalt surface, 6/24 with a 2,590 ft × 200 ft (789 m × 61 m) turf surface and 17/35 with a 1,825 ft × 200 ft (556 m × 61 m) turf surface. For the 12-month period ending September 13, 2010, the airport had 3,040 aircraft operations, an average of 58 per week: 100% general aviation. At that time there were 6 aircraft based at this airport: 6 single-engine.

== See also ==
- List of airports in Minnesota
