= Cambridge Municipal Airport (Minnesota) =

- IATA: none; ICAO: KCBG; FAA LID: CBG

Summary
- Airport type: Public
- Owner: City of Cambridge
- Serves: Cambridge, Minnesota
- Elevation AMSL: 945 ft (288 m)
- Coordinates: 45°33′27″N 093°15′51″W

Map
- Location of airport in Minnesota/United States CBG (the United States)

Runways
Direction	Length		Surface
Direction	ft	m	Surface
16/34	4,000	1,219	Asphalt

Statistics (2006)
- Aircraft operations: 16,850
- Based aircraft: 47
- Source: Federal Aviation Administration

Cambridge Municipal Airport (ICAO: KCBG, FAA LID: CBG) is a city-owned public-use airport located two miles (3 km) southwest of the central business district of Cambridge, a city in Isanti County, Minnesota, United States.

Although most U.S. airports use the same three-letter location identifier for the FAA and IATA, this airport is assigned CBG by the FAA but has no designation from the IATA (which assigned CBG to Cambridge Airport in Cambridge, England, United Kingdom).

== Facilities and aircraft ==
Cambridge Municipal Airport covers an area of 280 acres (110 ha) and has one runway designated 16/34 with a 4,000 x 75 ft (1,219 x 23 m) asphalt surface. For the 12-month period ending May 30, 2006, the airport had 16,850 aircraft operations, an average of 46 per day: 99% general aviation and 1% military. At that time there were 47 aircraft based at this airport: 94% single-engine, 2% multi-engine and 4% helicopter.

== See also ==
- List of airports in Minnesota
