= New York Mills Municipal Airport =

- IATA: none; ICAO: none

Summary
- Airport type: Public
- Owner: City of New York Mills
- Serves: New York Mills, Minnesota
- Elevation AMSL: 1,401 ft / 427 m
- Coordinates: 46°30′08″N 095°20′15″W
- Interactive map of New York Mills Municipal Airport

Runways
Direction	Length		Surface
Direction	ft	m	Surface
12/30	2,500	762	Turf

Statistics (2006)
- Aircraft operations: 500
- Source: Federal Aviation Administration

New York Mills Municipal Airport is a city-owned, public-use airport located two nautical miles (2.3 mi, 3.7 km) southeast of the central business district of New York Mills, a city in Otter Tail County, Minnesota, United States.

== Facilities and aircraft ==
New York Mills Municipal Airport covers an area of 62 acres (25 ha) at an elevation of 1,401 feet (427 m) above mean sea level. It has one runway designated 12/30 with a turf surface measuring 2,500 by 196 feet (762 x 60 m). For the 12-month period ending July 31, 2006, the airport had 500 general aviation aircraft operations, an average of 41 per month.

This airport no longer appears on satellite photos of the area. Its FAA record no longer exists. One report indicates that the airport closed in 2011.
