= Pipestone Municipal Airport =

- IATA: none; ICAO: KPQN; FAA LID: PQN

Summary
- Airport type: Public
- Owner: City of Pipestone
- Serves: Pipestone, Minnesota
- Elevation AMSL: 1,736 ft / 529 m
- Coordinates: 43°58′59.89″N 096°18′1.12″W

Map
- Location of airport in Minnesota / United States PQN (the United States)

Runways
Direction	Length		Surface
Direction	ft	m	Surface
18/36	4,306	1,312	Asphalt
9/27	2,522	769	Turf

Statistics
- Aircraft operations (2016): 8,200
- Based aircraft (2017): 17
- Source: Federal Aviation Administration

Pipestone Municipal Airport (ICAO: KPQN, FAA LID: PQN) is a city-owned public-use airport located one mile southeast of the central business district of Pipestone, a city in Pipestone County, Minnesota, United States.

== Facilities and aircraft ==
Pipestone Municipal Airport covers an area of 295 acres (1.19 km^{2}) and contains two runways designated 18/36 with a 4,306 x 75 ft (1,312 x 23 m) asphalt surface and 9/27 with a 2,522 x 221 ft (769 x 67 m) turf surface. For the 12-month period ending August 31, 2016, the airport had 8,200 aircraft operations, an average of 22 per day: 99% general aviation and less than 1% military. In March 2017, there were 17 aircraft based at this airport: all 17 single-engine.

== See also ==
- List of airports in Minnesota
