= Cloquet Carlton County Airport =

Airport in Minnesota, United States

- IATA: none; ICAO: KCOQ; FAA LID: COQ

Summary
- Airport type: Public
- Owner: Carlton County
- Serves: Cloquet, Minnesota
- Elevation AMSL: 1,279 ft (390 m)
- Coordinates: 46°42′04″N 092°30′13″W
- Website: CloquetAirport.com

Map
- Location of airport in Minnesota COQ (the United States)

Runways
Direction	Length		Surface
Direction	ft	m	Surface
18/36	4,003	1,220	Asphalt
7/25	3,100	945	Asphalt

Statistics (2005)
- Aircraft operations: 10,000
- Based aircraft: 51
- Source: Federal Aviation Administration

Cloquet Carlton County Airport (ICAO: KCOQ, FAA LID: COQ) is a county-owned public-use airport located three nautical miles (6 km) southwest of the central business district of Cloquet, a city in Carlton County, Minnesota, United States.

Although most U.S. airports use the same three-letter location identifier for the FAA and IATA, this airport is assigned COQ by the FAA but has no designation from the IATA (which assigned COQ to Choibalsan Airport in Choibalsan, Mongolia).

== Facilities and aircraft ==
Cloquet Carlton County Airport covers an area of 233 acres (94 ha) at an elevation of 1,279 feet (390 m) above mean sea level. It has two asphalt paved runways: 17/35 is 4,003 by 75 feet (1,220 x 23 m) and 7/25 is 3,100 by 75 feet (945 x 23 m).

For the 12-month period ending April 30, 2005, the airport had 10,000 aircraft operations, an average of 27 per day: 99% general aviation and 1% military. At that time there were 51 aircraft based at this airport: 98% single-engine and 2% ultralight.

== See also ==
- List of airports in Minnesota
