= Mankato Regional Airport =

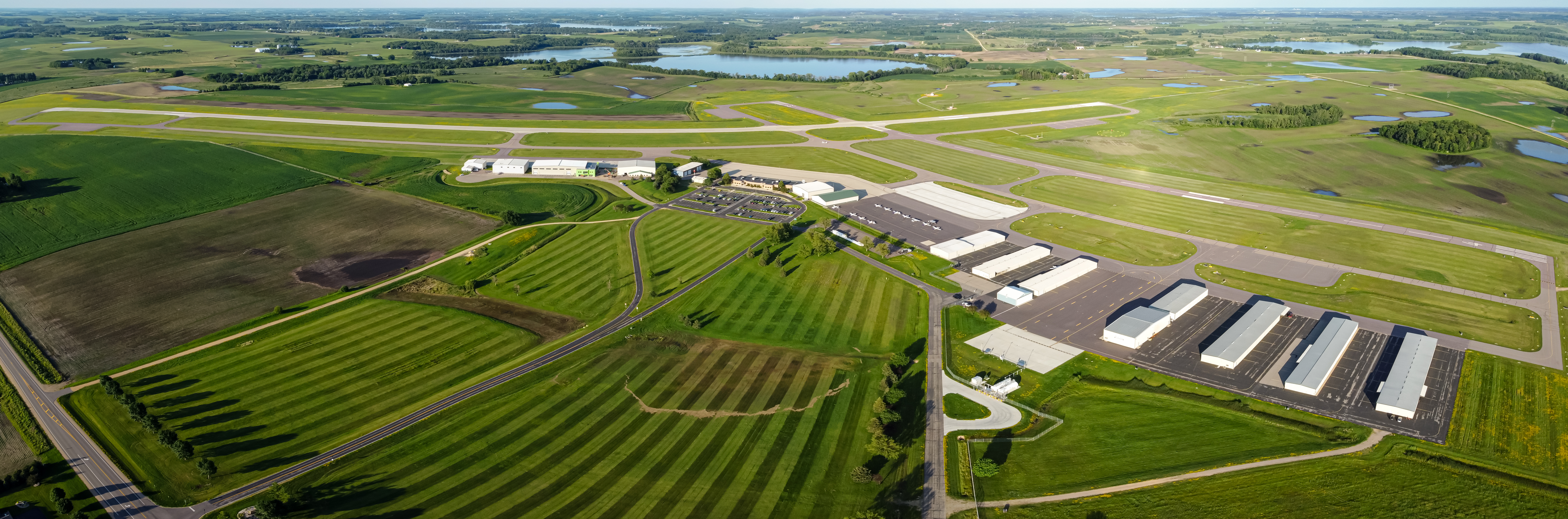
- IATA: MKT; ICAO: KMKT; FAA LID: MKT

Summary
- Airport type: Public
- Owner: City of Mankato
- Location: Mankato, Minnesota
- Elevation AMSL: 1,020 ft (310 m)
- Coordinates: 44°13′18″N 093°55′07″W

Map
- Location of airport in Minnesota / United States MKT (the United States)

Runways
Direction	Length		Surface
Direction	ft	m	Surface
15/33	6,600	2,012	Concrete
4/22	4,000	1,219	Asphalt

Statistics
- Aircraft operations (2015): 119,320
- Based aircraft (2017): 74
- Source: Federal Aviation Administration

Mankato Regional Airport (IATA: MKT, ICAO: KMKT, FAA LID: MKT) is a public airport located five miles (8 km) northeast of the central business district of Mankato, a city in Blue Earth County, Minnesota, United States. This airport is publicly owned by the city of Mankato. The airport is home to North Star Aviation (FBO) and Minnesota State University's flight training program.

== Facilities and aircraft ==
Mankato Regional Airport covers an area of 900 acres (360 ha) and contains two runways:

- Runway 4/22: 4,000 x 75 ft (1,219 x 23 m), Surface: Asphalt
- Runway 15/33: 6,600 x 100 ft (2,012 x 30 m), Surface: Concrete (Expanded from 5,400 feet (1,600 m) in 2007)

For the 12-month period ending July 31, 2015 the airport had 119,320 aircraft operations, an average of 327 per day: 97% general aviation, 3% air taxi and less than 1% military. In March 2017, there were 74 aircraft based at this airport: 56 single-engine, 13 multi-engine, 2 jet, 2 helicopter and 1 ultralight.

== History ==
By 1960, North Central Airlines provided scheduled service to Minneapolis–Saint Paul International Airport and Sioux Falls Regional Airport with stops at Mankato, Fairmont, and Worthington, Minnesota. North Central Airlines' final scheduled flight using a Douglas DC-3 took place on February 7, 1969 as flight #774. It flew the 30-minute leg from Mankato to Minneapolis-St. Paul. Republic Airlines provided service to Minneapolis-St. Paul in the late 1970s and early 1980s.

On December 22, 1969, the Mankato City Council approved Imperial Airways Inc. request to begin commercial helicopter service between Mankato and Minneapolis-St. Paul. The service started on December 26, 1969 with two daily round trip flights using Bell Jet Rangers. On December 4, 1970 Imperial Airways announced it was canceling its scheduled helicopter service flights in Minnesota. Other routes that were cut were its routes from Minneapolis-St. Paul to Rochester, Minnesota, and to downtown Minneapolis.

While no airlines serve Mankato Regional Airport as of August 2020, Sun Country Airlines, in partnership with Landline, began bus service between Mankato and Minneapolis–St. Paul in November 2019. This service allowed customers to book one itinerary from Mankato that includes bus transfer to Minneapolis, and then their flight to the next destination. Customers were allowed to check baggage in Mankato to be transferred directly to the aircraft, but had to clear security in Minneapolis. It also offered rebooking services in case flights or buses are delayed, ensuring customers are booked on another flight or bus to their final destination. This service was discontinued on March 19, 2023.

On August 17, 2020, Air Force One landed at Mankato Regional Airport for the first time. Due to the small size of the airport, President Donald Trump used a Boeing C-32 as Air Force One, instead of the usual Boeing VC-25.

== See also ==
- List of airports in Minnesota
