= St. James Municipal Airport =

- IATA: none; ICAO: KJYG; FAA LID: JYG

Summary
- Airport type: Public
- Owner: City of St James
- Location: St. James, Minnesota
- Elevation AMSL: 1,067 ft / 325 m
- Coordinates: 43°59′11″N 94°33′29″W
- Website: https://www.ci.stjames.mn.us/149/Airport

Map
- Location of airport in Minnesota / United States JYG (the United States)

Runways
| Direction | Length | | Surface |
| Direction | ft | m | Surface |
|---|---|---|---|
| 15/33 | 4,000 | 1,219 | Asphalt |

Statistics (2017)
- Aircraft operations (2017): 5,485
- Based aircraft (2017): 14
- Source: Federal Aviation Administration

St. James Municipal Airport (IATA: JYG, ICAO: KJYG, FAA LID: XXX) is a public airport located three miles east of the central business district in St. James, Minnesota, United States, in Watonwan County. It serves general aviation for St. James and the surrounding area. There is currently no scheduled air service.

== Facilities and aircraft ==
For the 12-month period ending June 30, 2017, the airport had 5,485 aircraft operations. During this reporting period 14 aircraft were based at this airport, 13 piston-engine and 1 jet.

== History ==
In the late 1950s local pilots raised enough money to purchase 20 acres of land, and built a 2700-foot turf runway. This site was slightly west of the current location. The city eventually acquired the airport for $1, and began the process of planning and building a new airport. The new airport had a single asphalt runway, 14/32, which measured 3400 x 75 feet. The runway was eventually extended to 4,000 ft. The current runway was renumbered from 14/32 to 15/33 due to shifts in magnetic variation.

== See also ==
- List of airports in Minnesota
