= Montevideo–Chippewa County Airport =

- IATA: MVE; ICAO: KMVE

Summary
- Location: Montevideo, Minnesota, United States
- Elevation AMSL: 1,035 ft / 315 m
- Coordinates: 44.971387°N 95.712014°W

Map
- Location of airport in Minnesota MVE (the United States)

Runways
Direction	Length		Surface
Direction	ft	m	Surface
14/32	3,999	1,219	Asphalt
3/21	2,361	720	Turf

Montevideo–Chippewa County Airport (IATA: MVE, ICAO: KMVE) is an airport in Montevideo, Minnesota, United States.

== See also ==
- List of airports in Minnesota
