= Hutchinson Municipal Airport (Minnesota) =

Airport in McLeod County, Minnesota, US

Coordinates: 44°51′36″N 094°22′57″W

Hutchinson Municipal Airport Butler Field
- IATA: none; ICAO: KHCD; FAA LID: HCD

Summary
- Airport type: Public
- Owner: City of Hutchinson
- Serves: Hutchinson, Minnesota
- Elevation AMSL: 1,060 ft (320 m)

Map
- Location of airport in Minnesota/United States HCD (the United States)

Runways
Direction	Length		Surface
Direction	ft	m	Surface
15/33	4,000	1,219	Asphalt

Statistics (2007)
- Aircraft operations: 12,395
- Source: Federal Aviation Administration

Hutchinson Municipal Airport (ICAO: KHCD, FAA LID: HCD), also known as Butler Field, is a public airport located two miles (3 km) south of the central business district of Hutchinson, a city in McLeod County, Minnesota, United States. It is owned by the City of Hutchinson. The airport is home to the Civil Air Patrol. There is maintenance on the field operated by ASI JET.

Although most U.S. airports use the same three-letter location identifier for the FAA and IATA, Hutchinson Municipal Airport is assigned HCD by the FAA but has no designation from the IATA.

== Facilities and aircraft ==
Hutchinson Municipal Airport covers an area of 160 acres (65 ha) which contains one asphalt paved runway (15/33) measuring 4,000 x 75 ft (1,219 x 23 m). For the 12-month period ending July 31, 2007, the airport had 12,395 aircraft operations, an average of 33 per day: 98% general aviation, 2% air taxi and <1% military.

== See also ==
- List of airports in Minnesota
