= Thief River Falls Regional Airport =

Airport in Minnesota, United States

- IATA: TVF; ICAO: KTVF; FAA LID: TVF

Summary
- Airport type: Public
- Owner: Thief River Falls Regional Airport Authority
- Serves: Thief River Falls, Minnesota
- Elevation AMSL: 1,119 ft (341 m)
- Coordinates: 48°03′56″N 096°11′06″W
- Website: Thief River Falls Regional Airport

Map
- Location of airport in Minnesota TVF (the United States)

Runways
Direction	Length		Surface
Direction	ft	m	Surface
13/31	6,504	1,982	Asphalt
4/22	4,997	1,523	Asphalt

Statistics
- Aircraft operations (2018): 32,268
- Based aircraft (2022): 19
- Source: Federal Aviation Administration

Thief River Falls Regional Airport (IATA: TVF, ICAO: KTVF, FAA LID: TVF) is a public use airport located three nautical miles (6 km) south of the central business district of Thief River Falls, a city in Pennington County, Minnesota, United States. The airport is owned by the Thief River Falls Regional Airport Authority. It is mostly used for general aviation but is also served by one commercial airline subsidized by the Essential Air Service program.

The National Plan of Integrated Airport Systems for 2019–2023 categorized it as a non-primary commercial service airport based on enplanements in 2018 (between 2,500 and 10,000 per year).

== Facilities and aircraft ==
Thief River Falls Regional Airport covers an area of 916 acres (371 ha) at an elevation of 1,119 feet (341 m) above mean sea level. It has two asphalt paved runways: 13/31 is 6,504 by 150 feet (1,982 x 46 m) and 4/22 is 4,997 by 75 feet (1,523 x 23 m).

For the 12-month period ending December 31, 2018, the airport had 32,268 aircraft operations, an average of 88 per day: 93% general aviation, 6% air taxi and 1% scheduled commercial. In January 2020, 23 aircraft were based at this airport: 18 single-engine, 2 multi-engine and 3 jet.

In 2023, airport management announced expansions that would take place over the coming years. In 2025, terminal upgrades including a new TSA checkpoint were completed.

== Airlines and destinations ==
=== Passenger ===
Airlines	Destinations
Denver Air Connection	Minneapolis/St. Paul

Destinations map
All passenger destinations from Thief River Falls Regional Airport (TVR)
Red = Year-round destination
Green = Seasonal destination
Blue = Future destination

=== Cargo ===
Airlines	Destinations
Alpine Air	Fargo
Freight Runners Express	Fargo
DHL operated by Encore Air Cargo operated by Bemidji Airlines	Minneapolis/St. Paul, Fargo
FedEx Feeder operated by Corporate Air	Fargo
FedEx Feeder operated by IFL Group Air Cargo	Memphis, Minneapolis/St. Paul
UPS Airlines operated by IFL Group Air Cargo	Louisville

== Statistics ==
Busiest domestic routes from TVF (September 2023 - August 2024)
Rank	Airport	Passengers
1	Minneapolis/St Paul	8,000

Passenger boardings (enplanements) by year, as per the FAA
Year	2008	2009	2010	2011	2012	2013	2014	2015	2016	2017	2018
Enplanements	3,092	2,721	2,479	2,418	2,819	2,079	363	1,029	3,524	5,735	4,805
Change	▼8.33%	▼12.00%	▼8.89%	▼2.46%	▲16.58%	▼26.25%	▼82.54%	▲183.47%	▲242.47%	▲62.74%	▼16.22%
Airline	Mesaba Airlines dba Northwest Airlink	Mesaba Airlines dba Delta Connection	Mesaba Airlines dba Delta Connection	Mesaba Airlines dba Delta Connection	Great Lakes Airlines	Great Lakes Airlines	Great Lakes Airlines	Great Lakes Airlines	Boutique Air	Boutique Air	Boutique Air
Destination(s)	Bemidji Minneapolis	Hibbing Minneapolis	Hibbing Minneapolis	Hibbing Minneapolis	Minneapolis Williston	Minneapolis	Minneapolis	Minneapolis	Minneapolis	Minneapolis	Minneapolis

== See also ==
- List of airports in Minnesota

== Other sources ==
- Essential Air Service documents (Docket OST-2001-10642) from the U.S. Department of Transportation:
  - Order 2005-6-13 (June 15, 2005): selecting Mesaba Aviation, Inc. d/b/a Northwest Airlink, an affiliate of Northwest Airlines, to provide subsidized essential air service (EAS) for the two-year period beginning June 1, 2005, at an annual subsidy of $777,709 for Thief River Falls and a combined annual subsidy of $2,160,770 for Fort Dodge and Mason City.
  - Order 2007-6-3 (June 6, 2007): re-selecting Mesaba Aviation Inc., d/b/a Northwest Airlink, to continue to provide subsidized essential air service (EAS) at Fort Dodge and Mason City, Iowa, and Thief River Falls, Minnesota, for the two-year period beginning June 1, 2007. Service will consist of 18 round trips per week at Fort Dodge and Mason City, routed Fort Dodge-Mason City-Minneapolis/St. Paul, at the combined annual subsidy rate of $21,113,865. Service at Thief River Falls will consist of 12 one-stop round trips per week to Minneapolis/St. Paul at the annual subsidy rate of $1,065,639. All service will be provided with 34-seat Saab 340 aircraft as Northwest Airlink.
  - Order 2009-4-20 (April 28, 2009): re-selecting Mesaba Aviation, Inc., d/b/a Delta Connection, to continue providing subsidized essential air service (EAS) at Fort Dodge and Mason City, IA, and Thief River Falls, MN, for the two-year period beginning June 1, 2009, at the annual subsidy rates of $2,225,213 for Fort Dodge and Mason City, and $1,230,322 for Thief River Falls.
  - Order 2011-11-30 (November 25, 2011): selecting Great Lakes Aviation, Ltd., to provide essential air service (EAS) at six communities at the following annual subsidy rates: Brainerd, Minnesota, $959,865; Fort Dodge, $1,798,693; Iron Mountain, $1,707,841; Mason City, $1,174,468; Thief River Falls, Minnesota, $1,881,815; and Watertown, $1,710,324, for the two-year period beginning when Great Lakes inaugurates full EAS at all six communities
  - Order 2012-6-23 (June 26, 2012): establishing the effective period for the Essential Air Service (EAS) contracts awarded to Great Lakes Aviation, Ltd., by Order 2011-11-30. ... The contracts will thus expire at the end of the 24-month period thereafter: May 31, 2014.
  - Order 2014-4-17 (April 18, 2014): reselecting Great Lakes Aviation to provide EAS at Thief River Falls, Minnesota, using 19 (reconfigured to 9) passenger Beech1900D aircraft with non-stop service to Minneapolis/St. Paul International Airport (Minneapolis) for 2 round trips each weekday and weekend (12 total per week), for the two-year term from June 1, 2014 through May 31, 2016, for an annual subsidy of $2,428,750.
