= Dickinson Theodore Roosevelt Regional Airport =

Airport in North Dakota, United States

- IATA: DIK; ICAO: KDIK; FAA LID: DIK

Summary
- Airport type: Public
- Owner: Dickinson Airport Authority
- Serves: Dickinson, North Dakota
- Elevation AMSL: 2,592 ft (790 m)
- Coordinates: 46°47′50″N 102°48′07″W
- Website: dickinsonairport.com

Map
- Location within North Dakota Location within the United States

Runways
| Direction | Length | | Surface |
| Direction | ft | m | Surface |
|---|---|---|---|
| 14/32 | 7,301 | 2,225 | Concrete |
| 7/25 | 4,700 | 1,433 | Asphalt |

Statistics
- Aircraft operations (2019): 17,114
- Based aircraft (2021): 34
- Passenger volume (12 months ending July 2021): 15,710
- Scheduled flights: 691
- Sources: FAA, airport website, BTS

Dickinson Theodore Roosevelt Regional Airport (IATA: DIK, ICAO: KDIK, FAA LID: DIK), formerly Dickinson Municipal Airport, is six miles south of Dickinson, in Stark County, North Dakota. It is owned by the Dickinson Airport Authority.

The airport serves western North Dakota, eastern Montana and northwest South Dakota, home to Theodore Roosevelt National Park. The airport sees one airline, SkyWest Airlines operating on behalf of United Express, flying an Bombardier CRJ200 to Denver; Delta Connection flew to Minneapolis-St. Paul until November 30, 2015. The first airline flights were Frontier DC-3s in 1959.

Federal Aviation Administration records say the airport had 9,164 passenger boardings (enplanements) in calendar year 2008, 8,924 in 2009 and 10,383 in 2010.

The Federal Aviation Administration (FAA) National Plan of Integrated Airport Systems for 2021–2025 categorized it as a non-hub primary commercial service facility.

The airport is named for Theodore Roosevelt, Jr., the 26th President of the United States.

== Facilities ==
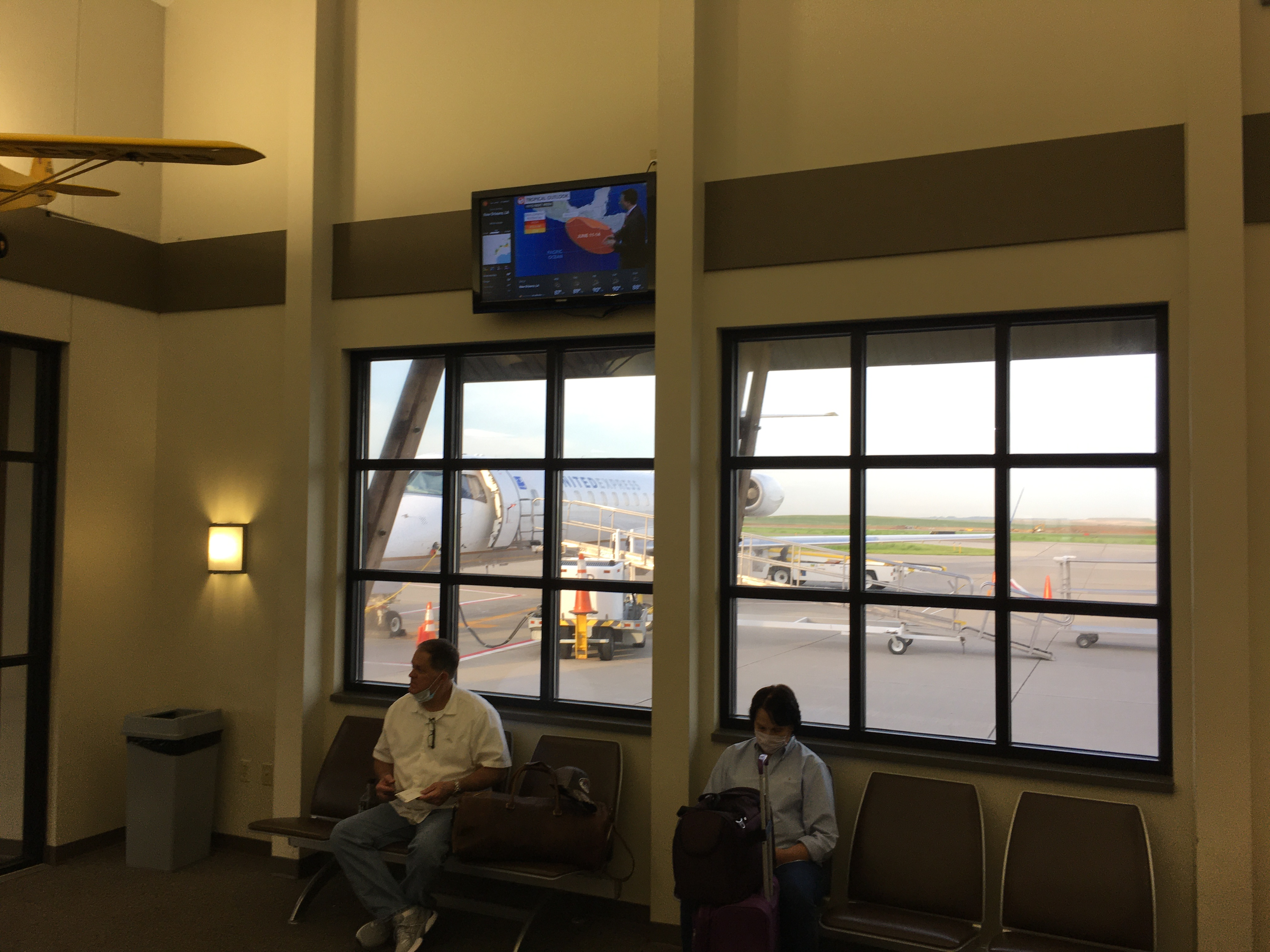
The sole boarding gate at the airport, as seen in 2021

The airport covers 626 acres (253 ha) at an elevation of 2,592 feet (790 m). It has two runways: 14/32 is a concrete runway that is 7,301 by 100 feet (2,225 x 30 m) and 7/25 is an asphalt runway that is 4,700 by 75 feet (1,433 x 23 m). In the early 2020s, runway 14/32 was rebuilt and extended with a $5,388,889 FAA Airport Improvement Program grant.

In the year ending October 25, 2019, the airport had 17,114 aircraft operations, average 47 per day: 85% general aviation, 9% airline, 6% air taxi, and <1% military. In October 2021, 34 aircraft were based at the airport: 28 single-engine, 4 multi-engine, 1 jet, and 1 helicopter.

== Airlines and destinations ==
=== Passenger ===
| Airlines | Destinations | Refs |
|---|---|---|
| United Express | Denver | |

United Express uses CRJ200s operated by SkyWest Airlines

Passenger Destinations map
Passenger Destinations from Dickinson Theodore Roosevelt Regional Airport

=== Cargo ===
| Airlines | Destinations | Refs |
|---|---|---|
| Encore Air Cargo operated by Bemidji Airlines | Fargo | |
| FedEx Feeder operated by Corporate Air | Fargo | |

Cargo Destinations map
Cargo Destinations from Dickinson Theodore Roosevelt Regional Airport

=== Statistics ===
Top domestic destinations (July 2024 – June 2025)
| Rank | Airport | Passengers | Airline |
|---|---|---|---|
| 1 | Denver International (DEN) | 25,450 | United |

== See also ==
- List of airports in North Dakota

== Other sources ==
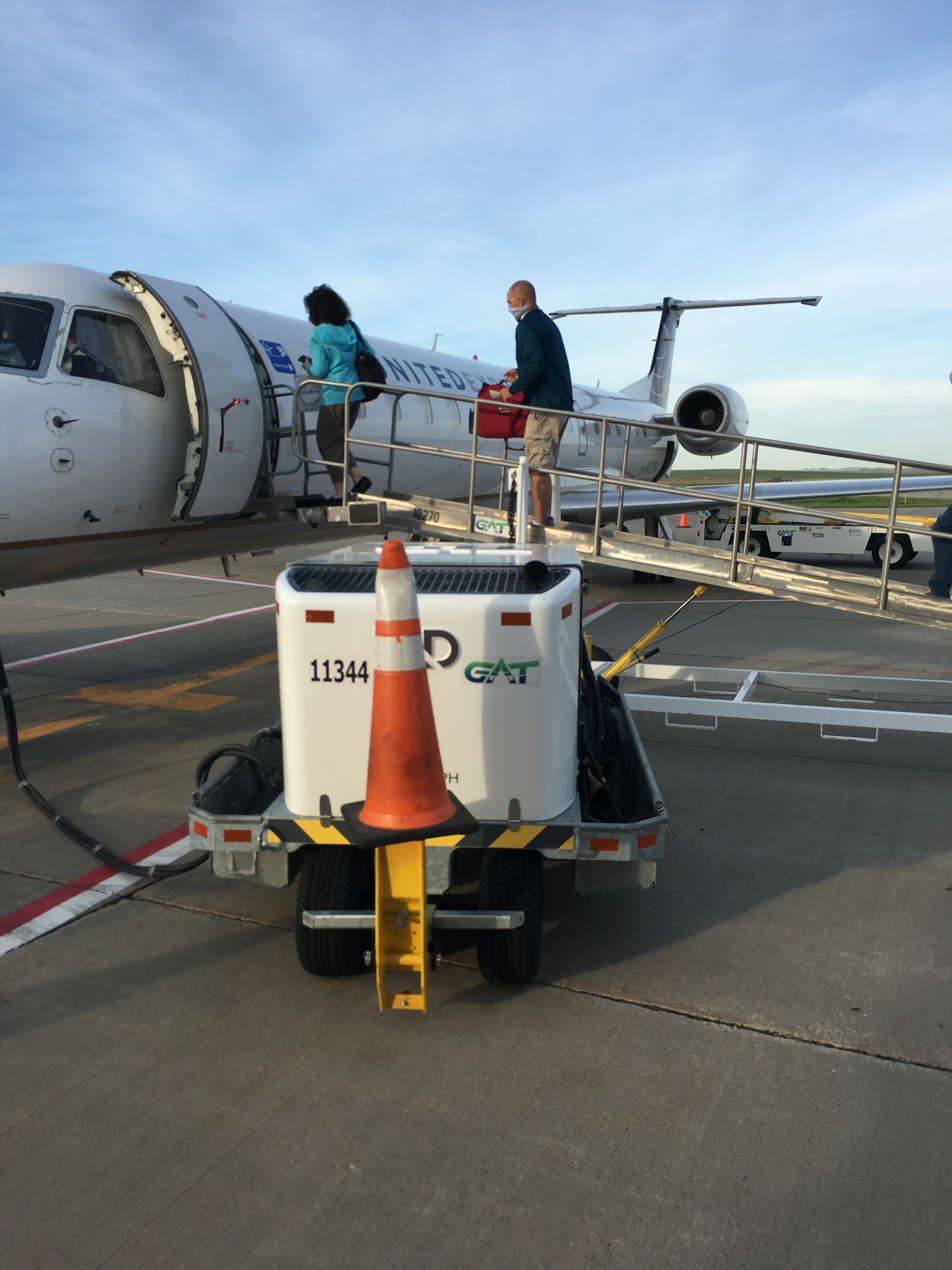
Passengers boarding a United Express EMB-145 for a flight to Denver

- Essential Air Service documents (Docket OST-1995-697) from the U.S. Department of Transportation:
  - Order 2005-1-9: selecting Great Lakes Aviation, Ltd., to provide small community air service with Embraer Brasilia aircraft at Dickinson, North Dakota, for two years for an annual subsidy rate of $1,697,248.
  - Order 2006-11-21: re-selecting Great Lakes Aviation, Ltd., operating as both a United Airlines and Frontier code-share partner, to provide subsidized essential air service (EAS) at Dickinson, North Dakota, for an annual subsidy rate of $1,696,977, for the two-year period of February 1, 2007, through January 31, 2009.
  - Order 2008-10-24: re-selecting Great Lakes Aviation, Ltd., operating as both a Frontier Airlines and United Airlines code-share partner, to provide subsidized essential air service (EAS) at Dickinson, North Dakota, for an annual subsidy rate of $2,274,177, for the two-year period of February 1, 2009, through January 31, 2011.
  - Order 2010-11-16: re-selecting Great Lakes Aviation, Ltd., operating as both a Frontier Airlines and United Airlines code-share partner, to provide subsidized essential air service (EAS) at Dickinson, North Dakota, for an annual subsidy rate of $2,019,177, for the two-year period of February 1, 2011, through January 31, 2013.
