= Bemidji Regional Airport =

- IATA: BJI; ICAO: KBJI; FAA LID: BJI

Summary
- Airport type: Public
- Owner: City of Bemidji / Beltrami County
- Serves: Bemidji, Minnesota
- Hub for: Bemidji Airlines
- Elevation AMSL: 1,391 ft (424 m)
- Coordinates: 47°30′39″N 094°56′05″W
- Website: BemidjiAirport.org

Map
- Location within Minnesota Location within the United States

Runways
Direction	Length		Surface
Direction	ft	m	Surface
13/31	7,004	2,135	Asphalt
7/25	5,700	1,737	Asphalt

Statistics (2021)
- Passengers (2020): 31,470
- Aircraft operations (2021): 13,756
- Based aircraft: 72
- Source: Bureau of Transportation Statistics, Federal Aviation Administration

Bemidji Regional Airport (IATA: BJI, ICAO: KBJI, FAA LID: BJI) is three miles northwest of Bemidji, in Beltrami County, Minnesota, United States. It is owned by the city of Bemidji and Beltrami County.

The airport is used for general aviation and is served by SkyWest Airlines, as Delta Connection for Delta Air Lines, as well as four cargo airlines. In 2012, a major terminal rehabilitation project was completed, which expanded the terminal from 13,000 square feet to almost 29,000 square feet.

Airline flights (Wisconsin Central DC-3s) began in 1951–52.

== Facilities ==
Bemidji Regional Airport covers 1,740 acres (700 ha) at an elevation of 1,391 feet (424 m). It has two asphalt runways: 13/31 is 7,004 by 150 feet (2,135 x 46 m) and 7/25 is 5,700 by 150 feet (1,737 x 46 m). The airport does not have a control tower.

In the year ending December 31, 2021 the airport had 13,756 aircraft operations, average 38 per day: 72% general aviation, 11% airline, 13% air taxi and 4% military. In December 2021, 72 aircraft were based at this airport: 38 single-engine, 31 multi-engine and 3 helicopter.

== Airlines and destinations ==
=== Passenger ===
Airlines	Destinations
Delta Connection	Minneapolis/St. Paul

Destinations map
Destinations from Bemidji Regional Airport

=== Cargo ===
Airlines	Destinations
Bemidji Airlines	Brainerd, Eveleth, Minneapolis/St. Paul
FedEx Feeder operated by Corporate Air	Fargo
Freight Runners Express	Madison, Seattle–Boeing
UPS Airlines	Minneapolis/St. Paul

== Statistics ==
=== Top destinations ===
Busiest routes out of BJI (September 2023 - August 2024)
Rank	City	Passengers	Carriers
1	Minneapolis/St Paul	28,000	Delta Connection

== Medevac ==
Bemidji Regional Airport is one of four locations for Sanford Health AirMed, a level 1 Trauma Center located in Fargo, North Dakota.

== History ==
In 2020 the airport received a $1,123,770 CARES Act award.

On September 18, 2020, the Bemidji Airport was where President Donald Trump learned about the death of Supreme Court Justice Ruth Bader Ginsburg. Trump was notified of her death after a campaign rally while walking towards Air Force One.

== See also ==
- List of airports in Minnesota
