= Williston Basin International Airport =

Airport in Williston, North Dakota, United States

- IATA: XWA; ICAO: KXWA; FAA LID: XWA

Summary
- Airport type: Public
- Owner/Operator: City of Williston, North Dakota
- Serves: Williston, North Dakota
- Opened: October 10, 2019; 6 years ago
- Elevation AMSL: 2,353 ft (717 m)
- Coordinates: 48°15′35″N 103°45′02″W
- Website: www.flywilliston.net

Map
- Location within North Dakota Location within the United States

Runways
Direction	Length		Surface
Direction	ft	m	Surface
04/22	4,502	1,372	Concrete
14/32	7,503	2,287	Concrete

Statistics (2024)
- Passenger volume: 197,936
- Scheduled flights: 1,153
- Based aircraft (2022): 32
- Source: Federal Aviation Administration, BTS

Williston Basin International Airport (IATA: XWA, ICAO: KXWA, FAA LID: XWA) is an airport serving Williston, a city in the U.S. state of North Dakota. It is located 9 nmi (17 km) northwest of the city.

Williston Basin Airport has two runways and a 110,000-square-foot (10,000 m^{2}) terminal building. It was built to replace Sloulin Field International Airport, which previously served Williston and had experienced difficulty dealing with the increase in air traffic to Williston amid the North Dakota oil boom. The airport opened to the public on October 10, 2019.

== History ==
The airport previously serving Williston was Sloulin Field International Airport. Sloulin Field Airport dealt with design concerns, constraints on expansion, and the need for runway works. In addition, the airport had difficulty coping with a significant rise in air traffic amid the North Dakota oil boom.

In 2011, officials began to consider either making renovations to Sloulin Field or building a new airport. The cost of refurbishments was less than that of constructing a new airport; however, officials determined that building a new airport was the cheaper option. Not having to limit air service to Williston during construction at Sloulin Field would save revenue, and the city would gain from decommissioning the old airport and selling the land. The total cost of the project was $240 million, which was paid by the FAA, the state of North Dakota, and the city of Williston.

A groundbreaking ceremony took place on October 10, 2016, with several members of the state government in attendance. Procedural and weather-related problems delayed the start of construction to mid-2017. The airport opened to the public on October 10, 2019, with short-haul service to Minneapolis/St. Paul by Delta Connection and Denver by United Express. Shortly after the airport's opening, both carriers began using larger regional jets accommodating up to 76 passengers on some flights as compared to smaller 50-seat planes used previously in Williston.

== Infrastructure ==
XWA covers 1600 acres (647 ha) of land. The airport opened with one runway, 14/32, with dimensions of 7,503 by 150 feet (2,287 m × 46 m). A crosswind runway, 4/22, which measures 4,502 by 75 feet (1,372 m × 23 m), was opened on November 5, 2020 and is mainly intended for use by smaller aircraft.

The terminal occupies 110,000 square feet (10,000 m^{2}) and has four gates, three of which have jet bridges. It can handle up to 350,000 passengers annually.

At the end of 2022, there were 32 aircraft based at this airport: 25 single-engine, 5 multi-engine, and 2 helicopter. Currently, the FAA does not have any published aircraft operations data for this airport.

== Access ==
Williston Basin International Airport is located about 10 miles (16 km) northwest of Williston. A 2-mile (3.2 km) road was built to connect the airport to the U.S. Route 85 truck bypass.

== Airlines and destinations ==
=== Passenger ===
Airlines	Destinations
Sun Country Airlines	Seasonal: Las Vegas
United Express	Denver

Destinations map
Destinations from Williston Basin International Airport
Red = Year-round destination
Green = Seasonal destination
Blue = Future destination

=== Cargo ===
Airlines	Destinations
Encore Air Cargo operated by Bemidji Airlines	Fargo
FedEx Feeder operated by Corporate Air	Fargo

Destinations map
Destinations from Williston Basin International Airport
Red = Year-round destination
Green = Seasonal destination

== Statistics ==
=== Carrier shares ===
Carrier shares (June 2025 – May 2026)
Carrier	Passengers (arriving and departing)
SkyWest	205,000(97.16%)
Sun Country	5,990(2.84%)

=== Top destinations ===
Busiest domestic routes from XWA (June 2025 – May 2026)
Rank	Airport	Passengers	Carriers
1	Denver, Colorado	67,060	United Express
2	Minneapolis/St. Paul, Minnesota	35,660	Delta Connection
3	Las Vegas, Nevada	3,010	Sun Country

== See also ==
- List of airports in North Dakota
