= List of Sun Country Airlines destinations =

This is a list of destinations that Sun Country Airlines currently serves as of November 2023. Charter destinations are not included.

== Destinations ==
Domestic destinations map
Continental domestic destinations served by Sun Country Airlines
Red = Year-round destination
Green = Seasonal destination
Blue = Future destination

Country	City	Airport	Notes	Refs
Aruba	Oranjestad	Queen Beatrix International Airport	Seasonal	
Bahamas	Nassau	Lynden Pindling International Airport	Terminated	
Belize	Belize City	Philip S. W. Goldson International Airport	Seasonal	
Canada	Montreal	Montréal–Trudeau International Airport	Seasonal	
Canada	Toronto	Toronto Pearson International Airport	Seasonal	
Canada	Vancouver	Vancouver International Airport	Seasonal	
Cayman Islands	Grand Cayman	Owen Roberts International Airport	Seasonal	
Costa Rica	Liberia	Guanacaste Airport	Seasonal	
Dominican Republic	Punta Cana	Punta Cana International Airport	Seasonal	
Honduras	Roatán	Juan Manuel Gálvez International Airport	Seasonal	
Jamaica	Montego Bay	Sangster International Airport	Seasonal	
Mexico	Cancun	Cancún International Airport	Seasonal	
Mexico	Cozumel	Cozumel International Airport	Seasonal	
Mexico	Huatulco	Bahías de Huatulco International Airport	Terminated	
Mexico	Ixtapa/Zihuatanejo	Ixtapa-Zihuatanejo International Airport	Seasonal	
Mexico	Los Cabos	Los Cabos International Airport	Seasonal	
Mexico	Manzanillo	Playa de Oro International Airport	Terminated	
Mexico	Mazatlán	Mazatlán International Airport	Seasonal	
Mexico	Puerto Vallarta	Licenciado Gustavo Díaz Ordaz International Airport	Seasonal	
St. Kitts & Nevis	Basseterre	Robert L. Bradshaw International Airport	Terminated	
St. Maarten	Philipsburg	Princess Juliana International Airport	Seasonal	
Turks and Caicos Islands	Providenciales	Providenciales International Airport	Seasonal	
United Kingdom	London	Gatwick Airport	Terminated	
United Kingdom	London	London Stansted Airport	Terminated	
United States (Alaska)	Anchorage	Ted Stevens Anchorage International Airport	Seasonal	
United States (Alaska)	Fairbanks	Fairbanks International Airport	Terminated	
United States (Arizona)	Phoenix	Phoenix Sky Harbor International Airport		
United States (Arizona)	Phoenix	Phoenix–Mesa Gateway Airport	Seasonal	
United States (Arizona)	Tucson	Tucson International Airport	Seasonal	
United States (California)	Los Angeles	Los Angeles International Airport		
United States (California)	Monterey	Monterey Regional Airport	Seasonal	
United States (California)	Oakland	Oakland San Francisco Bay Airport	Seasonal	
United States (California)	Orange County	John Wayne Airport	Terminated	
United States (California)	Palm Springs	Palm Springs International Airport	Seasonal	
United States (California)	Sacramento	Sacramento International Airport	Terminated	
United States (California)	San Diego	San Diego International Airport		
United States (California)	San Francisco	San Francisco International Airport		
United States (California)	Santa Barbara	Santa Barbara Municipal Airport	Terminated	
United States (California)	Santa Rosa	Charles M. Schulz–Sonoma County Airport	Terminated	
United States (Colorado)	Colorado Springs	Colorado Springs Airport	Terminated	
United States (Colorado)	Denver	Denver International Airport		
United States (Connecticut)	Hartford	Bradley International Airport	Seasonal	
United States (District of Columbia)	Washington D.C.	Ronald Reagan Washington National Airport	Terminated	
United States (District of Columbia)	Washington D.C.	Washington Dulles International Airport	Seasonal	
United States (Florida)	Destin/Fort Walton Beach	Destin–Fort Walton Beach Airport	Seasonal	
United States (Florida)	Fort Lauderdale	Fort Lauderdale-Hollywood International Airport	Seasonal	
United States (Florida)	Fort Myers	Southwest Florida International Airport		
United States (Florida)	Jacksonville	Jacksonville International Airport	Seasonal	
United States (Florida)	Miami	Miami International Airport	Seasonal	
United States (Florida)	Orlando	Orlando International Airport		
United States (Florida)	Punta Gorda/Fort Myers	Punta Gorda Airport	Seasonal	
United States (Florida)	Sarasota	Sarasota–Bradenton International Airport	Seasonal	
United States (Florida)	St. Petersburg-Clearwater	St. Pete–Clearwater International Airport	Seasonal	
United States (Florida)	Tampa	Tampa International Airport		
United States (Florida)	West Palm Beach	President Donald J. Trump International Airport	Seasonal	
United States (Georgia)	Atlanta	Hartsfield–Jackson Atlanta International Airport	Seasonal	
United States (Georgia)	Savannah	Savannah/Hilton Head International Airport	Seasonal	
United States (Hawaii)	Honolulu	Daniel K. Inouye International Airport	Terminated	
United States (Idaho)	Boise	Boise Airport	Seasonal	
United States (Illinois)	Chicago	Chicago Midway International Airport	Terminated	
United States (Illinois)	Chicago	Chicago O'Hare International Airport		
United States (Indiana)	Indianapolis	Indianapolis International Airport	Seasonal	
United States (Kentucky)	Louisville	Louisville Muhammad Ali International Airport	Seasonal	
United States (Louisiana)	New Orleans	Louis Armstrong New Orleans International Airport	Seasonal	
United States (Maine)	Portland	Portland International Jetport	Seasonal	
United States (Maryland)	Baltimore	Baltimore/Washington International Thurgood Marshall Airport		
United States (Massachusetts)	Boston	Boston Logan International Airport	Seasonal	
United States (Michigan)	Detroit	Detroit Metropolitan Wayne County Airport	Seasonal	
United States (Michigan)	Grand Rapids	Gerald R. Ford International Airport	Seasonal	
United States (Michigan)	Lansing	Capital Region International Airport	Terminated	
United States (Michigan)	Traverse City	Cherry Capital Airport	Seasonal	
United States (Minnesota)	Duluth	Duluth International Airport	Terminated	
United States (Minnesota)	Minneapolis/Saint Paul	Minneapolis–Saint Paul International Airport	Hub	
United States (Minnesota)	Rochester	Rochester International Airport	Seasonal	
United States (Mississippi)	Gulfport	Gulfport–Biloxi International Airport	Seasonal	
United States (Missouri)	Branson	Branson Airport		
United States (Missouri)	Kansas City	Kansas City International Airport	Seasonal	
United States (Missouri)	St. Louis	St. Louis Lambert International Airport	Seasonal	
United States (Montana)	Billings	Billings Logan International Airport	Terminated	
United States (Montana)	Bozeman	Bozeman Yellowstone International Airport	Seasonal	
United States (Montana)	Missoula	Missoula Montana Airport	Seasonal	
United States (Montana)	Kalispell	Glacier Park International Airport	Seasonal	
United States (Nebraska)	Omaha	Eppley Airfield	Terminated	
United States (Nevada)	Las Vegas	Harry Reid International Airport		
United States (Nevada)	Reno	Reno–Tahoe International Airport	Seasonal	
United States (New Hampshire)	Manchester	Manchester–Boston Regional Airport	Seasonal	
United States (New Jersey)	Atlantic City	Atlantic City International Airport	Seasonal	
United States (New Jersey)	Newark	Newark Liberty International Airport		
United States (New Mexico)	Albuquerque	Albuquerque International Sunport	Seasonal	
United States (New York)	Buffalo	Buffalo Niagara International Airport	Seasonal	
United States (New York)	New York	John F. Kennedy International Airport	Seasonal	
United States (New York)	Syracuse	Syracuse Hancock International Airport	Seasonal	
United States (North Carolina)	Asheville	Asheville Regional Airport	Terminated	
United States (North Carolina)	Charlotte	Charlotte Douglas International Airport	Seasonal	
United States (North Carolina)	Raleigh/Durham	Raleigh-Durham International Airport	Seasonal	
United States (North Carolina)	Wilmington	Wilmington International Airport	Seasonal	
United States (North Dakota)	Williston	Williston Basin International Airport	Seasonal	
United States (Ohio)	Cincinnati/Covington	Cincinnati/Northern Kentucky International Airport		
United States (Ohio)	Cleveland	Cleveland Hopkins International Airport	Terminated	
United States (Ohio)	Columbus	John Glenn Columbus International Airport	Seasonal	
United States (Oklahoma)	Tulsa	Tulsa International Airport	Seasonal	
United States (Oregon)	Portland	Portland International Airport		
United States (Oregon)	Redmond	Redmond Municipal Airport	Terminated	
United States (Pennsylvania)	Philadelphia	Philadelphia International Airport	Seasonal	
United States (Pennsylvania)	Pittsburgh	Pittsburgh International Airport	Seasonal	
United States (Puerto Rico)	San Juan	Luis Muñoz Marín International Airport		
United States (Rhode Island)	Providence	Rhode Island T. F. Green International Airport	Seasonal	
United States (South Carolina)	Charleston	Charleston International Airport	Seasonal	
United States (South Carolina)	Myrtle Beach	Myrtle Beach International Airport	Seasonal	
United States (South Dakota)	Rapid City	Rapid City Regional Airport	Seasonal	
United States (Tennessee)	Nashville	Nashville International Airport		
United States (Texas)	Austin	Austin–Bergstrom International Airport	Seasonal	
United States (Texas)	Dallas/Fort Worth	Dallas Fort Worth International Airport		
United States (Texas)	Harlingen	Valley International Airport	Seasonal	
United States (Texas)	Houston	George Bush Intercontinental Airport	Seasonal	
United States (Texas)	Houston	William P. Hobby Airport	Seasonal	
United States (Texas)	San Antonio	San Antonio International Airport	Seasonal	
United States (U.S. Virgin Islands)	St. Thomas	Cyril E. King Airport	Seasonal	
United States (Vermont)	Burlington	Burlington International Airport	Seasonal	
United States (Virginia)	Richmond	Richmond International Airport	Seasonal	
United States (Washington)	Seattle	Seattle–Tacoma International Airport		
United States (Washington)	Spokane	Spokane International Airport	Seasonal	
United States (Wisconsin)	Appleton	Appleton International Airport	Seasonal	
United States (Wisconsin)	Eau Claire	Chippewa Valley Regional Airport	Seasonal	
United States (Wisconsin)	Green Bay	Green Bay–Austin Straubel International Airport	Terminated	
United States (Wisconsin)	Madison	Dane County Regional Airport	Seasonal	
United States (Wisconsin)	Milwaukee	Milwaukee Mitchell International Airport	Seasonal	
United States (Wyoming)	Jackson Hole	Jackson Hole Airport	Seasonal	
