= Grand Rapids–Itasca County Airport =

Grand Rapids–Itasca County Airport Gordon Newstrom Field
- IATA: GPZ; ICAO: KGPZ

Summary
- Airport type: Public
- Operator: Grand Rapids / Itasca County, Minnesota
- Location: Minnesota
- Elevation AMSL: 1,355 ft (413 m)
- Coordinates: 47°12′40″N 93°30′35″W

Map
- Location of airport in Minnesota / United States GPZ (the United States)

Runways
Direction	Length		Surface
Direction	ft	m	Surface
16/34	5,747	1,752	Asphalt
5/23	3,000	914	Asphalt
10/28	1,334	407	Turf

Statistics
- Based aircraft (2017): 75

Grand Rapids–Itasca County Airport (IATA: GPZ, ICAO: KGPZ), also known as Gordon Newstrom Field or Gordy Newstrom Field, is a public airport located two miles (3 km) southeast of the central business district (CBD) of Grand Rapids, a city in Itasca County, Minnesota, United States. The airport has three runways.

Mesaba Airlines established a presence at the airport as a fixed-base operator in 1949. The company soon established its headquarters at the airport, beginning its first scheduled to Minneapolis in 1973. Mesaba's growth saw the airline's primary base relocate to Minneapolis–Saint Paul International Airport in the mid 1980s. Scheduled service continued through an affliation with Northwest Airlines until March 2004.

== Facilities and aircraft ==
The airport covers an area of 1400 acres (567 ha) at an elevation of 1,355 feet (413 m) above mean sea level. In January 2017, there were 75 aircraft based at this airport: 71 single-engine, 3 multi-engine and 1 jet.

== Airlines and destinations ==
=== Cargo ===
Airlines	Destinations	Refs
Bemidji Airlines	Minneapolis	

== See also ==
- List of airports in Minnesota
