= Fergus Falls Municipal Airport =

Fergus Falls Municipal Airport Einar Mickelson Field
- IATA: FFM; ICAO: KFFM

Summary
- Airport type: Public
- Operator: City of Fergus Falls
- Location: Fergus Falls, Minnesota
- Elevation AMSL: 1,182 ft (360 m)
- Coordinates: 46°17′04″N 96°09′24″W

Map
- Location of airport in Minnesota/United States FFM (the United States)

Runways
| Direction | Length | | Surface |
| Direction | ft | m | Surface |
|---|---|---|---|
| 13/31 | 5,639 | 1,719 | Asphalt |
| 17/35 | 3,301 | 1,006 | Asphalt |

Statistics (2008)
- Aircraft operations: 8,550
- Based aircraft: 42

Fergus Falls Municipal Airport (IATA: FFM, ICAO: KFFM, FAA LID: FFM), also known as Einar Mickelson Field, is a public airport located three miles (5 km) west of the central business district (CBD) of Fergus Falls, a city in Otter Tail County, Minnesota, United States. It covers 731 acres (296 ha) and has two runways. It is primarily used for general aviation. The airport was formerly served by Northwest Airlink and United Express.

== History ==
Initial plans for an airfield in Fergus Falls began in 1927. In 1928, a tract of land west of the city of Fergus Falls was leased for use as a municipal airport. When the farmer who owned that land decided to grow wheat there in 1934, the city was forced to relocate the airport.

After World War II, plans were developed for construction of a new airport dedicated in honor of Flying Tiger Einar Mickelson and, "all the other Fergus Falls airmen who lost their lives in the Second World War." The airport and airfield were formally dedicated on September 19, 1948. The first airliner landed there in 1953. It was a DC-3 from North Central Airlines.

A new 4,800 foot runway was added in 1980. A new arrival-departure building at the airport opened up in 1983.

== Aircraft operations ==
As of July 31, 2011 there were 47 aircraft based at the airport with an average 23 aircraft operations per day. 85% were general aviation, 13% were air taxi and 1% was military. There were 41 single engine aircraft, 3 multi-engine and 3 ultralight aircraft based at the airport.

=== Cargo ===
| Airlines | Destinations |
|---|---|
| Bemidji Airlines | Minneapolis/St. Paul |
| UPS | Minneapolis/St. Paul |

== See also ==
- List of airports in Minnesota
