= Brainerd Lakes Regional Airport =

Airport in Minnesota, United States

- IATA: BRD; ICAO: KBRD; FAA LID: BRD

Summary
- Airport type: Public
- Owner: City of Brainerd & Crow Wing County
- Serves: Brainerd, Minnesota
- Elevation AMSL: 1,232 ft (376 m)
- Coordinates: 46°24′08″N 094°08′08″W
- Website: brainerdairport.com

Map
- Location of airport in Minnesota BRD (the United States)

Runways
Direction	Length		Surface
Direction	ft	m	Surface
16/34	7,100	2,164	Concrete
5/23	6,512	1,984	Concrete

Helipads
Number	Length		Surface
Number	ft	m	Surface
H1	60	18	Concrete

Statistics
- Passengers (2020): 22,480
- Aircraft operations (year ending 6/15/2022): 37,900
- Based aircraft (2022): 78
- Source: Bureau of Transportation Statistics, Federal Aviation Administration

Brainerd Lakes Regional Airport (IATA: BRD, ICAO: KBRD, FAA LID: BRD) is a public use airport located three nautical miles (6 km) northeast of the central business district of Brainerd, a city in Crow Wing County, Minnesota, United States. The airport is owned by the city and county. It is mostly used for general aviation but has regular services by one passenger and three cargo airlines.

As per Federal Aviation Administration records, the airport had 16,404 passenger boardings (enplanements) in 2010, and 22,233 in 2018. It is included in the National Plan of Integrated Airport Systems for 2017–2021, which categorized it as a primary commercial service airport (more than 10,000 enplanements per year).

== Facilities and aircraft ==
Brainerd Lakes Regional Airport covers an area of 2,597 acres (1,051 ha) at an elevation of 1,232 feet (376 m) above mean sea level. It has two active runways with concrete surfaces: 16/34 is 7,100 by 150 feet (2,164 x 46 m) and 5/23 is 6,512 by 150 feet (1,984 x 46 m). The airport also has one helipad designated H1 which measures 60 by 60 feet (18 x 18 m).

For the 12-month period ending June 15, 2022, the airport had 37,900 aircraft operations, an average of 104 per day: 87% general aviation, 8% scheduled commercial, 4% air taxi and 1% military. In June 2022, there were 78 aircraft based at this airport: 59 single-engine, 3 multi-engine, 4 jet and 12 helicopter.

== Airlines and destinations ==
=== Passenger ===
Airlines	Destinations
Delta Connection	Minneapolis/St. Paul

Destination Map
Destinations from Brainerd Lakes Regional Airport

=== Cargo ===
Airlines	Destinations
Bemidji Airlines	Fargo, Minneapolis/St. Paul
FedEx Feeder	Rochester (MN)
UPS Airlines	Minneapolis/St. Paul

Busiest domestic routes out of BRD (September 2023 - August 2024)
Rank	City	Passengers	Carriers
1	Minneapolis/St. Paul	15,000	Delta

== History ==
In 2020 the airport received a $17,955,696 CARES Act award.

== Accidents at BRD ==
- On January 9, 1983, Republic Airlines Flight 927, a Convair 580, skidded off the runway during a nonprecision approach in sleet and snow showers. The aircraft skidded off the right side of the runway and the right propeller struck a snowbank and the propeller penetrated the cabin, killing one passenger and seriously injuring another. The aircraft was later repaired and placed back into service.

== See also ==
- List of airports in Minnesota

== Other sources ==
- Essential Air Service documents (Docket OST-2011-0135) from the U.S. Department of Transportation:
  - Ninety Day Notice (July 15, 2011): of Mesaba Aviation, Inc. and Pinnacle Airlines, Inc. of termination of service at Brainerd, MN.
  - Order 2011-9-5 (September 13, 2011): prohibiting suspension of service and requesting proposals.
  - Order 2011-11-30 (November 23, 2011): selecting Great Lakes Aviation, Ltd., to provide essential air service (EAS) at six communities at the following annual subsidy rates: Brainerd, Minnesota, $959,865; Fort Dodge, $1,798,693; Iron Mountain, $1,707,841; Mason City, $1,174,468; Thief River Falls, Minnesota, $1,881,815; and Watertown, $1,710,324, for the two-year period beginning when Great Lakes inaugurates full EAS at all six communities.
  - Order 2012-6-3 (June 6, 2012): extending the Essential Air Service obligation of the two wholly owned subsidiaries of Pinnacle Airlines Corporation—Mesaba Aviation, Inc. and Pinnacle Airlines, d/b/a Delta Connection at the eight communities listed below (Muscle Shoals, AL; Alpena, MI; Iron Mountain/Kingsford, MI; Brainerd, MN; International Falls, MN; Greenville, MS; Laurel/Hattiesburg, MS; Tupelo, MS) for 30 days, through, July 9, 2012.
