= TVF =

TVF may refer to:

- TVF Media, a UK company
- The Viral Fever, an Indian video on demand and over-the-top streaming service
- Thief River Falls Regional Airport, Minnesota, US (IATA code)
- Transavia France (ICAO code)
- Truth-value focus, an abbreviation used in linguistics
- Turkey Wealth Fund (Türkiye Varlık Fonu)
- Turkish Volleyball Federation
