= Rice Lake Regional Airport =

Rice Lake Regional Airport Carl's Field
- IATA: RIE; ICAO: KRPD; FAA LID: RPD

Summary
- Airport type: Public
- Owner/Operator: City of Rice Lake
- Serves: Rice Lake, Wisconsin
- Location: Cameron, Wisconsin
- Opened: July 1995
- Time zone: CST (UTC−06:00)
  - Summer (DST): CDT (UTC−05:00)
- Elevation AMSL: 1,109 ft (338 m)
- Coordinates: 45°25′12″N 091°46′24″W
- Website: www.RiceLakeAirport.com

Map
- Location of airport in Wisconsin RIE (the United States)

Runways
Direction	Length		Surface
Direction	ft	m	Surface
1/19	6,700	2,042	Asphalt
13/31	3,500	1,067	Asphalt

Statistics
- Aircraft operations (2023): 27,650
- Based aircraft (2024): 26
- Sources: FAA. and airport website

Rice Lake Regional Airport (IATA: RIE, ICAO: KRPD, FAA LID: RPD) is a city owned public use airport located five nautical miles (9 km) southwest of the central business district of Rice Lake, a city in Barron County, Wisconsin, United States. The airport is situated in the village of Cameron. It is included in the Federal Aviation Administration (FAA) National Plan of Integrated Airport Systems for 2025–2029, in which it is categorized as a local general aviation facility.

Opened in 1995, it was named Carl's Field for Carl Rindlisbacher, the longtime manager of Arrowhead field, one of Rice Lake's previous airports.

Although most U.S. airports use the same three-letter location identifier for the FAA and IATA, this airport is assigned RPD by the FAA and RIE by the IATA.

== Facilities and aircraft ==
Rice Lake Regional Airport covers an area of 750 acres (300 ha) at an elevation of 1,109 feet (338 m) above mean sea level. It has two asphalt paved runways: the primary runway 1/19 is 6,700 by 100 feet (2,042 x 30 m) and ILS equipped; the crosswind runway 13/31 is 3,500 by 75 feet (1,067 x 23 m).

RICE LAKE (RPD) VOR/DME, 110.0 MHz, is located on field.

Rice Lake Air Center is the fixed-base operator.

For the 12-month period ending July 3, 2023, the airport had 27,650 aircraft operations, an average of 76 per day: 90% general aviation, 10% air taxi and less than 1% military. In June 2024, there were 26 aircraft based at this airport: 21 single-engine, 2 multi-engine, 1 jet and 2 helicopter.

=== Cargo ===
Airlines	Destinations
UPS	Minneapolis/St. Paul

== See also ==
- List of airports in Wisconsin
