= Martin Hector =

Martin Solan Hector
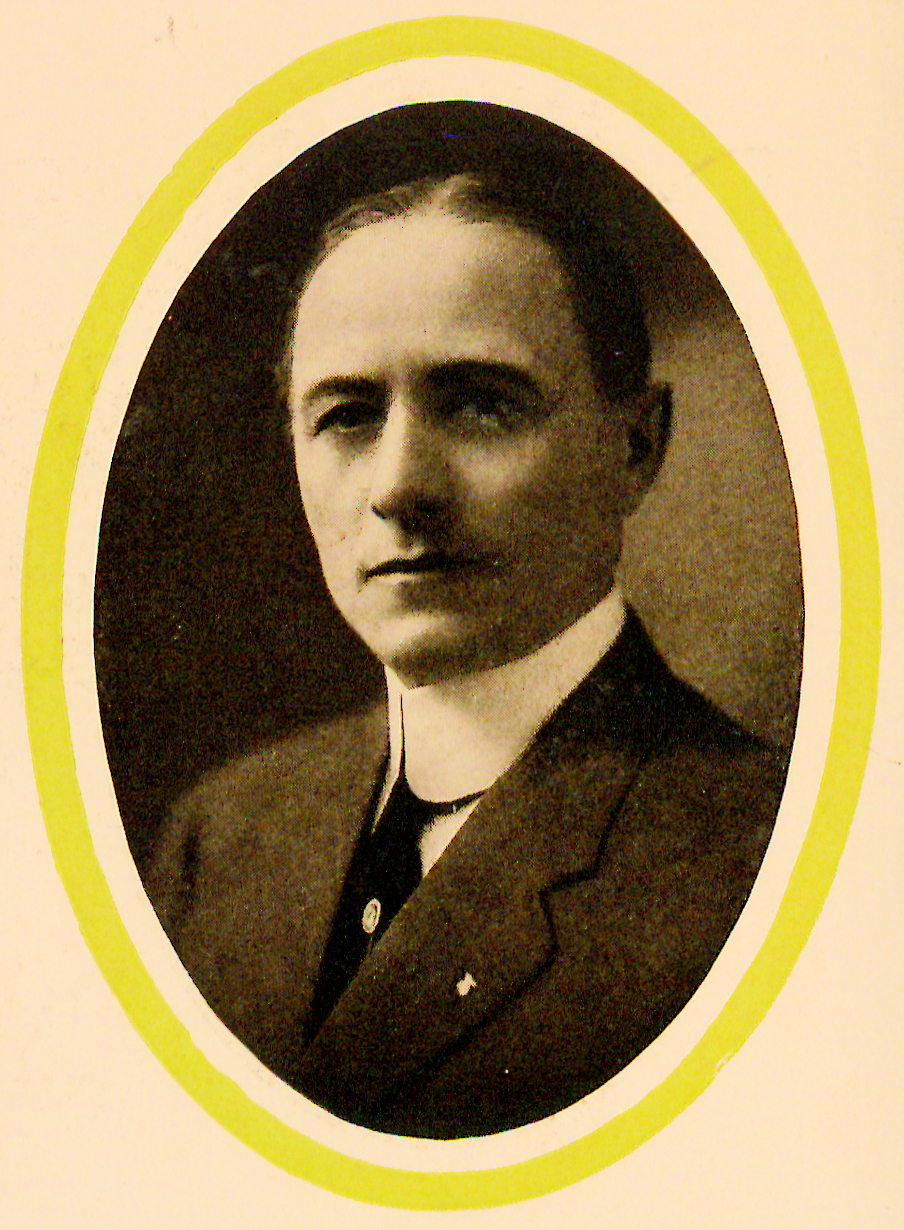
- Portrait of Martin Hector, circa 1913
- Born: December 21, 1852; Hammerfest, Norway
- Died: March 14, 1938 (aged 85); Fargo, North Dakota, US
- Citizenship: American
- Occupations: Businessperson, banker
- Spouses: Caroline Paulson
- Children: 4

Martin Solan Hector (December 21, 1852 – March 14, 1938) was an influential citizen and businessman of Fargo, North Dakota. He first leased and then later donated land to the city for the airport, which still bears his name (Hector International Airport).

== Early life ==
Martin was born in Hammerfest, Norway, on December 21, 1852, to Frederick and Caroline (Holmgren) Hector. The Hector family immigrated to the United States in the mid-1860s and settled in Chicago. Caroline (Holmgren) Hector died not long after arriving in Chicago. The family later moved to Duluth, Minnesota. Martin's older brother Jacob Hector was already there working in the fishing and tugboat business on Lake Superior.

== Liquor business ==
Martin began working for the Northern Pacific Railroad, and this work brought him to Moorhead, Minnesota, in 1872. While he was in Moorhead, a fight started and the owner of a saloon was killed. Earlier, this saloon owner had ordered a large shipment of liquor. It soon arrived in Moorhead by train. Martin seized an opportunity and purchased this unclaimed liquor with the money he had earned from his railroad work. He then purchased land near the railroad and started what would become a prosperous wholesale wine and liquor business.

Because Fargo was growing more rapidly than Moorhead, Martin moved his business across the Red River to Fargo, Dakota Territory. When North Dakota entered the union as a dry state in 1889, Martin was forced to close this business.

== Banking ==
When his liquor business closed, Martin moved into the banking industry. He purchased stock in the Citizen's National Bank, which was Fargo's first bank, and was named vice president.

In 1896, the Citizen's National Bank failed. However, Martin and other businessmen reorganized the bank and renamed it the Fargo National Bank. The bank opened in 1897, and Martin served as its president for 41 years.

== Public service ==
With his success in the private sector, Martin became involved in several projects in the public sector. He invested himself in the Fargo-Moorhead community and the state of North Dakota.

In 1892, he was appointed by Governor John Burke to North Dakota's World's Columbian Exposition board. The board was tasked with creating a plan for a state exhibit at the Chicago World's Fair in 1893. Martin was chosen to serve as president of this board.

In 1895, he was appointed to the North Dakota Interstate Board of Immigration. He was also involved with the Fargo Commercial Club and the city council, serving as president for many years.

In 1937, a bridge was planned to be built across the Red River. However, because of the Great Depression, not enough money was raised. Martin paid the difference to allow construction to continue. After the dedication, Martin drove the first vehicle across the bridge.

== Airport ==
Martin's most notable contribution to the community was the airport. In 1927, Martin leased a quarter-section of land to the city. In 1931, Martin donated the land to the city. Several years later, Martin's daughter-in-law, Margaret Hector, donated more acres of land to the city. The airport was named Hector Field in honor of Martin Hector. The airport was later named Hector International Airport.

== Family ==
While still involved with the liquor business, Martin married Caroline Paulson. The couple had four children: Martina "Minnie," Frederick "Fred," Evelyn, and Clay. Clay Hector died as an infant.

A brother of Martin's, Henry Hector, also came to Fargo in 1878, and he started a grocery business. He later became involved with the Continental Hose Company and served as its president. Henry also served on the Fargo city council. Henry died in 1940.

Jacob Hector, Martin's brother who lived and worked in Duluth, remained in Duluth. He died in 1910.
