= Falls International Airport =

Airport in Minnesota, United States

- IATA: INL; ICAO: KINL; FAA LID: INL

Summary
- Airport type: Public
- Owner: City of International Falls
- Serves: International Falls, Minnesota
- Elevation AMSL: 1,185 ft (361 m)
- Coordinates: 48°33′56″N 093°24′08″W
- Website: internationalfallsairport.com

Map
- Location of airport in Minnesota INL (the United States)

Runways
Direction	Length		Surface
Direction	ft	m	Surface
13/31	7,400	2,256	Asphalt
4/22	2,999	914	Asphalt

Statistics
- Aircraft operations (2018): 38,850
- Based aircraft (2020): 20
- Source: Federal Aviation Administration

Falls International Airport (IATA: INL, ICAO: KINL, FAA LID: INL) is a city-owned public-use airport located in International Falls, a city in Koochiching County, Minnesota, United States. It is mostly used for general aviation but is also served by one commercial airline with scheduled passenger service subsidized by the Essential Air Service program.

As per Federal Aviation Administration records, the airport had 16,590 passenger boardings (enplanements) in calendar year 2008, 15,861 enplanements in 2009, and 14,051 in 2010. It is included in the National Plan of Integrated Airport Systems for 2017–2021, which categorized it as a primary commercial service airport (more than 10,000 enplanements per year).

== Facilities and aircraft ==
Falls International Airport covers an area of 681 acres (276 ha) at an elevation of 1,185 feet (361 m) above mean sea level. It has two asphalt paved runways: 13/31 is 7,400 by 150 feet (2,256 x 46 m) and 4/22 is 2,999 by 75 feet (914 x 23 m).

For the 12-month period ending December 31, 2015, the airport had 39,900 aircraft operations, an average of 109 per day: 88% general aviation, 6% scheduled commercial, 6% air taxi and <1% military. In March 2017, there were 20 aircraft based at this airport: all 20 single-engine.

== Airlines and destinations ==
=== Passenger ===
Airlines	Destinations
Delta Connection	Minneapolis/St. Paul

=== Top destinations ===
Busiest routes from INL (September 2023 - August 2024)
Rank	City	Passengers	Carriers
1	Minneapolis/St. Paul	14,000	Delta Connection

=== Cargo ===
Airlines	Destinations
UPS	Minneapolis/St. Paul

== History ==
In 2020 the airport received a $1,070,873 CARES Act award.

== See also ==
There are two small airports on the Canadian side:

- Fort Frances Municipal Airport – small general aviation airport in Fort Frances, Ontario
- Fort Frances Water Aerodrome – private floatplane base on Rainy Lake
- List of airports in Minnesota

== Other sources ==
- Essential Air Service documents (Docket DOT-OST-2009-0160) from the U.S. Department of Transportation:
  - Ninety-day notice (July 14, 2009): from Mesaba Aviation, Inc. of its intent to discontinue unsubsidized scheduled air service at the following communities, effective October 12, 2009: Paducah, KY; Alpena, MI; Muskegon, MI; Hancock, MI; Sault Ste. Marie, MI; International Falls, MN; Tupelo, MS and Eau Claire, WI.
- Essential Air Service documents (Docket OST-2009-0304) from the U.S. Department of Transportation:
  - Memorandum (November 19, 2009): closing out docket DOT-2009-0160 and opening up eight new dockets for the various communities (Alpena, MI; Eau Claire, WI; Hancock/Houghton, MI; International Falls, MN; Muskegon, MI; Paducah, KY; Sault Ste. Marie, MI; Tupelo, MS).
  - Order 2010-5-18 (May 13, 2010): setting final past-period subsidy rates for Mesaba Airlines, Inc., d/b/a Delta Connection, for its forced service at Alpena and Sault Ste. Marie, Michigan, International Falls, Minnesota, and Tupelo, Mississippi. Also selecting Mesaba to provide essential air service (EAS) at three of these four communities on a prospective basis. At the fourth community, Tupelo, we are tentatively selecting Mesaba to provide service based on a pro-rata application of the rate Mesaba agreed to which the staff applied to a reduced service level.
  - Ninety Day Notice (July 15, 2011): from MESABA AVIATION, INC. and PINNACLE AIRLINES, INC. of termination of service at International Falls, MN.
  - Order 2011-9-5 (September 13, 2011): prohibiting suspension of service and requesting proposals
  - Order 2012-4-8 (April 5, 2012): selecting Great Lakes Aviation, Ltd., to provide Essential Air Service (EAS) at International Falls, Minnesota, for $993,247 annual subsidy. The service is to consist of 18 nonstop round trips per week to Minneapolis (MSP) year round with 19-seat Beech 1900 aircraft.
  - Order 2012-6-3 (June 6, 2012): extending the Essential Air Service obligation of the two wholly owned subsidiaries of Pinnacle Airlines Corporation – Mesaba Aviation, Inc. and Pinnacle Airlines, d/b/a Delta Connection at the eight communities listed below (Muscle Shoals, AL; Alpena, MI; Iron Mountain/Kingsford, MI; Brainerd, MN; International Falls, MN; Greenville, MS; Laurel/Hattiesburg, MS; Tupelo, MS) for 30 days, through, July 9, 2012.
