= Sloulin Field International Airport =

Airport of Williston, North Dakota, United States (1947–2019)

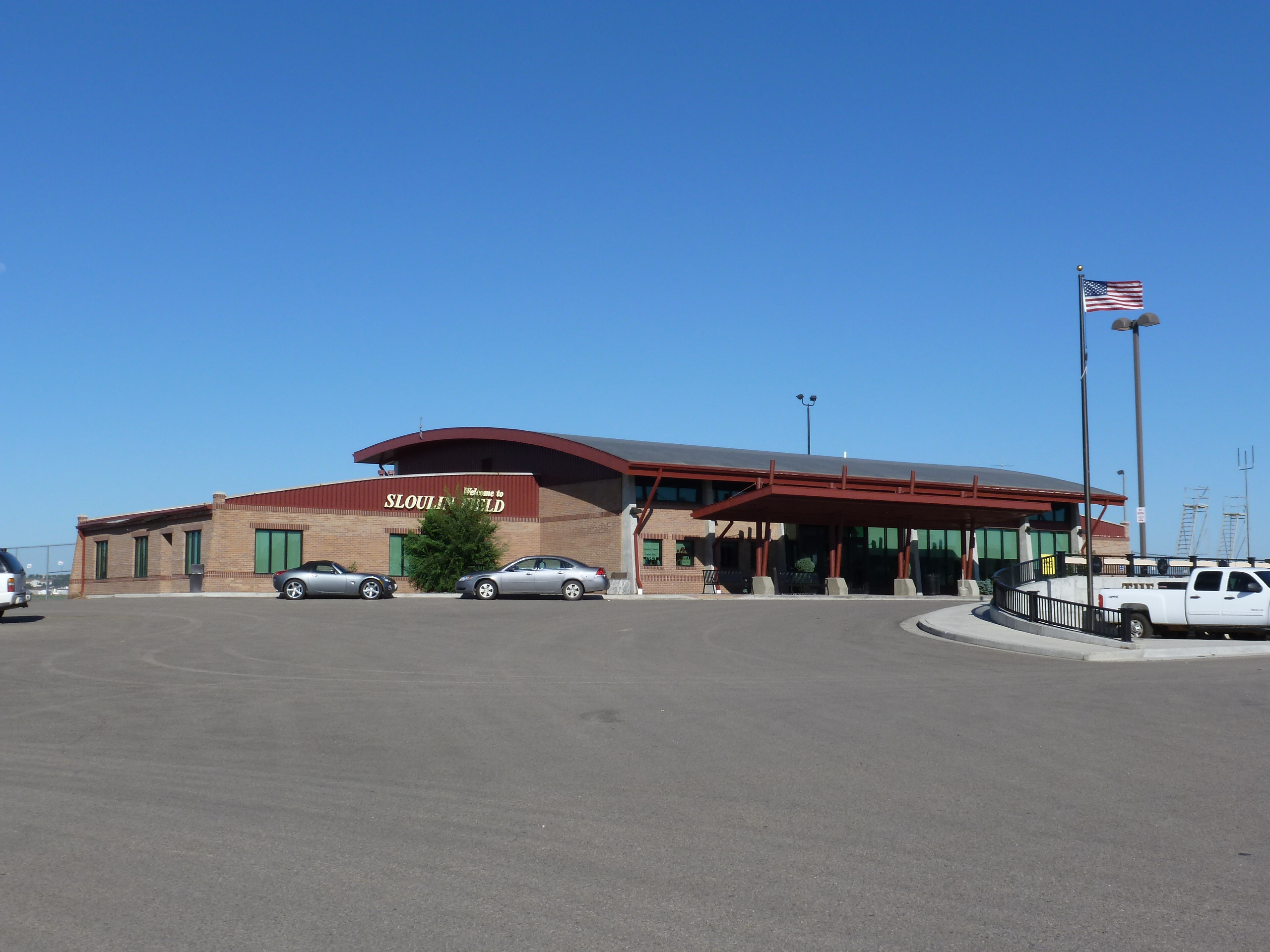
- IATA: ISN; ICAO: KISN; FAA LID: ISN

Summary
- Airport type: Defunct
- Owner/Operator: City of Williston, North Dakota
- Serves: Williston, North Dakota
- Opened: 1947
- Closed: October 10, 2019
- Elevation AMSL: 1,982 ft / 604 m
- Coordinates: 48°10′41″N 103°38′32″W
- Website: www.flywilliston.net

Map

Runways
Direction	Length		Surface
Direction	ft	m	Surface
11/29	6,650	2,027	Asphalt (closed)
2/20	3,453	1,052	Asphalt (closed)

Statistics (2015)
- Aircraft operations: 43,014
- Based aircraft: 49

Sloulin Field International Airport (IATA: ISN, ICAO: KISN, FAA LID: ISN) was an airport serving Williston, a city in North Dakota. It was two miles north of downtown and was owned and operated by the city. Built in 1947, the airport faced expansion constraints, design issues, and the need for runway refurbishment. For these reasons, as well as the rise in air traffic amid the North Dakota oil boom, officials decided to build Williston Basin International Airport. Sloulin Field Airport closed to the public on October 10, 2019.

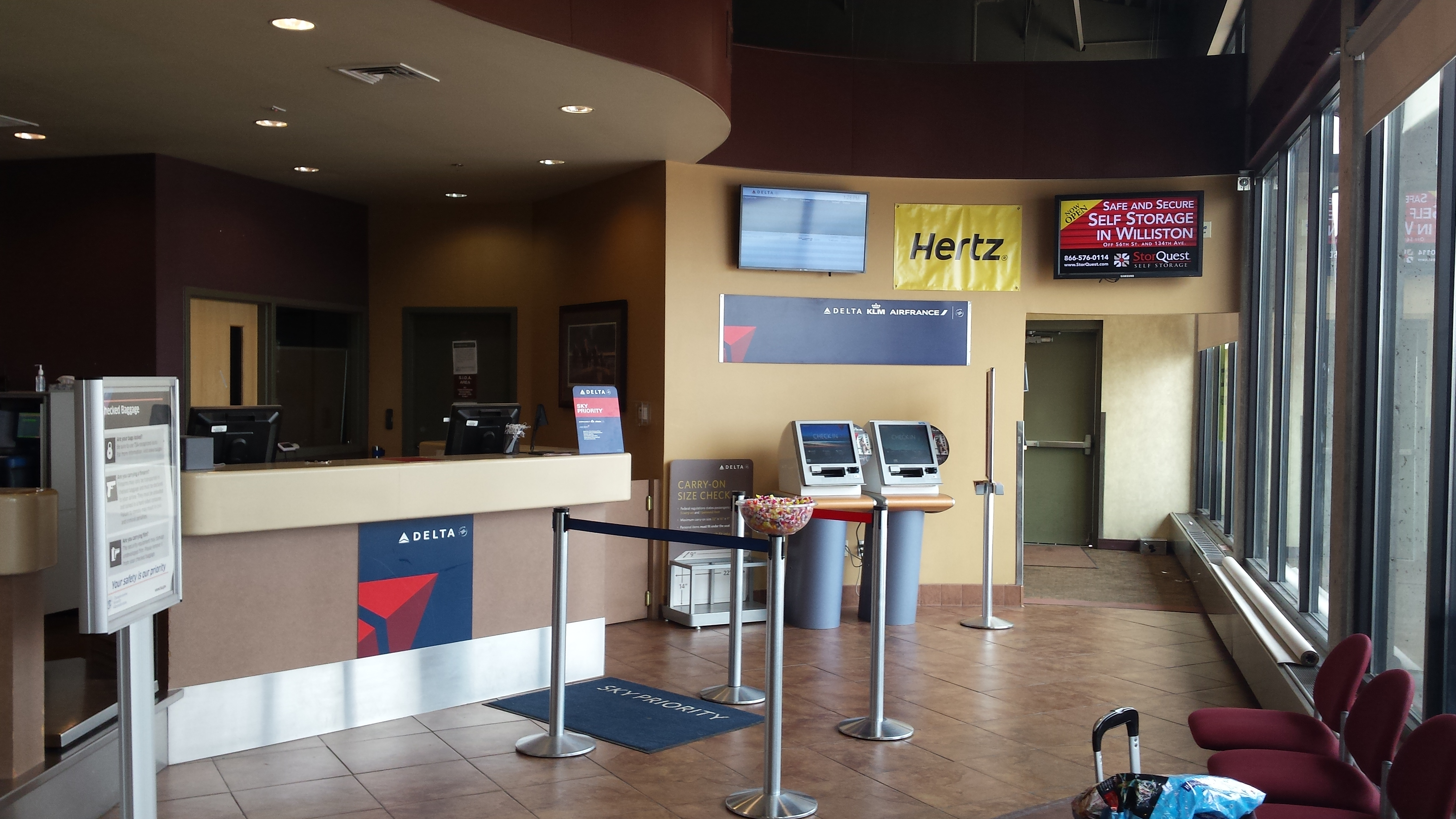
Check-in area of the terminal

== History ==
The first airport to serve Williston, North Dakota, was east of the city near Little Muddy Creek. The environment was unsuitable, and operations shifted to a new airport in 1936. The 23-acre (9.3 ha) site became too small, so Sloulin Field International Airport was built in 1947. ISN covered 740 acres (299 ha) of land.

Sloulin Field Airport faced various problems as the city grew. The 2004 master plan noted limited room for expansion because of the surrounding terrain and buildings, design issues that conflicted with the Federal Aviation Administration's standards, and the need to refurbish the runway. Runway improvements had also been recommended in the 1993 master plan.

A $4 million renovation project included the construction of a new terminal that opened in October 2006. When Delta Air Lines and United Airlines announced plans to serve Williston in 2012, airport officials decided to add a mobile home trailer to provide additional capacity for the terminal.

In light of the issues highlighted in the 2004 master plan and increased air service to Williston amid the North Dakota oil boom, plans either to renovate Sloulin Field Airport or to construct a new airport surfaced in 2011. Officials ultimately decided to build Williston Basin International Airport because of cost considerations. Sloulin Field Airport has been decommissioned, and the land will be sold.

== Infrastructure ==
=== Runway ===
The airport had two asphalt runways. Runway 11/29 was 6,650 by 100 feet (2,027 m × 30 m), and Runway 2/20 was 3,453 by 60 feet (1,052 m × 18 m).

=== Terminal ===
Sloulin Field Airport had a 9,600-square-foot (890 m^{2}) terminal with a 1,500-square-foot (140 m^{2}) mobile home trailer that provides extra seating capacity. The terminal had one gate and vending machines for passengers.

== Airlines and destinations ==
At the time of its closure, the airport had daily passenger service to Minneapolis on Delta Connection and to Denver on United Express. The airlines together offered five flights per day to Sloulin Field. The airport saw eleven flights per day, including nonstop service to Houston, at the height of the oil boom.

== Statistics ==
Sloulin Field International Airport had experienced great growth in air traffic amid the oil boom in the state. Passenger enplanements went from 27,860 in 2011 to a peak of 119,069 in 2014, a roughly 327% increase over three years.

In 2015 the airport had 43,014 aircraft operations, average 118 per day: 82% general aviation, 8% air taxi, 8% airline, 2% Air Cargo and <1% military. Forty-nine aircraft were then based at this airport: 86% single-engine, 10% multi-engine, and 4% helicopter.

=== Top domestic destinations ===
Top domestic destinations from ISN (Oct. 2017 – Sept. 2018)
Rank	Airport	Passengers	Airline
1	Denver, CO (DEN)	42,320	United Express
2	Minneapolis/St. Paul, MN (MSP)	30,120	Delta Connection
