= Merlin Airways =

Airline based in the United States

IATA	ICAO	Call sign
—	MEI	AVALON
- Founded: 2000; 25 years ago
- Hubs: San Antonio
- Secondary hubs: Miami; San Juan
- Fleet size: 6
- Parent company: Corporate Air
- Headquarters: Billings, Montana, United States

Merlin Airways is an American airline based in Billings, Montana, United States. It operates freight services under contract to FedEx Express and UPS Airlines. The airline previously conducted FAR Part 121 passenger operations in Alaska and Texas as well as providing charter service for gambling junkets. As of 1999 the company has ceased passenger operations to focus on the main aspect of its business, which is providing freight services to FedEx and UPS. Its headquarters is Billings, Montana, with hubs at Miami International Airport and at Luis Muñoz Marín International Airport, San Juan, Puerto Rico.

== History ==
The airline was established as SAT-Air in 1983 in San Antonio, Texas and was found fit, by the United States Department of Transportation, to conduct commuter operations under FAR Part 121, as a UPS feeder, until June 1995. The following year the airline was renamed to Merlin Express and continued the passenger operations until 1999. Corporate Air of Billings, Montana acquired the airline in 2000 changing the name to Merlin Airways.

In September 2025, Corporate Air filed for Chapter 11 bankruptcy protection in an effort to finalize a sale of itself to Vantage AGC.

== Fleet ==
As of March 2009 the Merlin Airways fleet includes:

- 1 × Fairchild Metro 23
- 5 × Fairchild Metro III
