= Hector International Airport =

Airport in Fargo, North Dakota

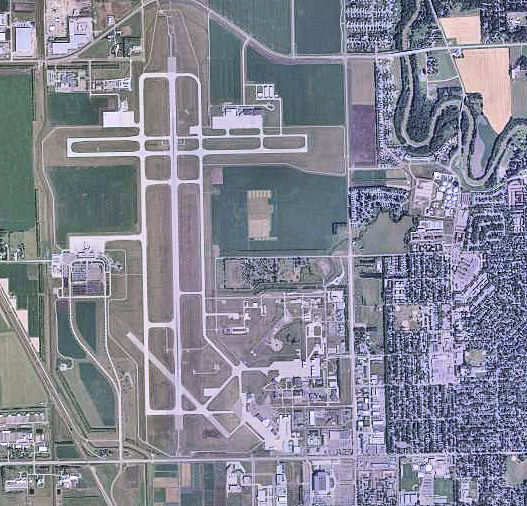
- 2006 USGS orthophoto
- IATA: FAR; ICAO: KFAR; FAA LID: FAR

Summary
- Airport type: Public / military
- Owner: Municipal Airport Authority of the City of Fargo
- Operator: Municipal Airport Authority
- Serves: Fargo, North Dakota and Moorhead, Minnesota (Fargo–Moorhead)
- Location: Fargo, North Dakota
- Opened: 1927
- Hub for: Corporate Air; Bemidji Airlines
- Elevation AMSL: 901 ft (275 m)
- Coordinates: 46°55′14″N 096°48′56″W
- Website: www.FargoAirport.com

Maps
- FAA airport diagram
- Interactive map of Hector International Airport

Runways
Direction	Length		Surface
Direction	ft	m	Surface
18/36	9,001	2,744	Concrete
9/27	6,302	1,921	Concrete
13/31	3,801	1,159	Concrete

Statistics (2025)
- Total passengers: 1,179,442 ▲8.0%
- Air carrier landings: 7,573
- Source: Hector International Airport

Hector International Airport (IATA: FAR, ICAO: KFAR, FAA LID: FAR) is a civil-military public airport three miles (5 km) northwest of Fargo, in Cass County, North Dakota, United States. The busiest airport in North Dakota, it is owned by the City of Fargo Municipal Airport Authority. Fargo Air National Guard Base is located adjacent to the airport.

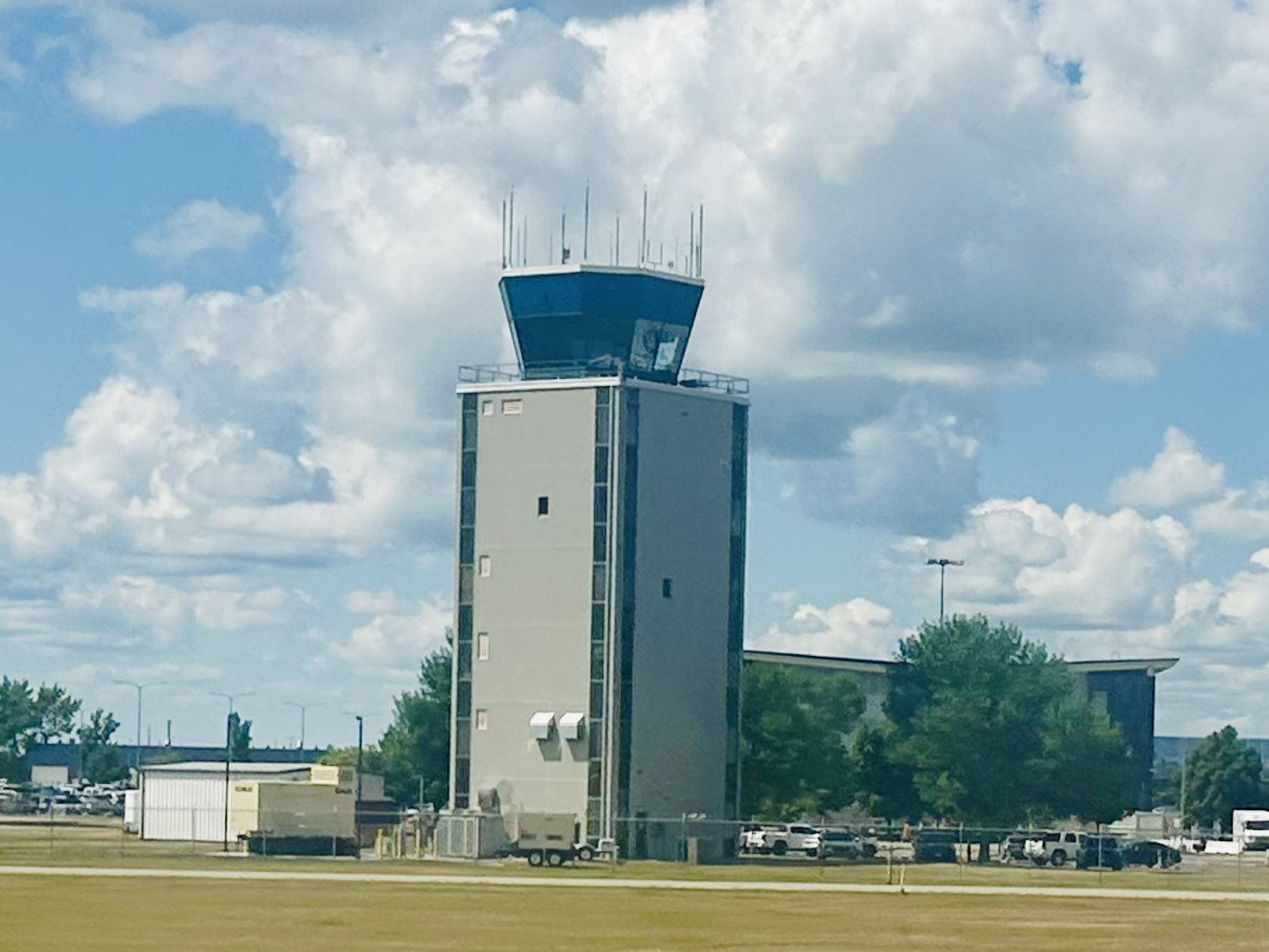
Hector International Airport Control Tower, Fargo, North Dakota

The airport was named after Martin Hector, who first leased, and then donated the original 50 acres of land to the city. Customs service is available for arrivals from Canada and other countries. Hector International has no scheduled passenger airline flights out of the country but has its international title (like many other airports) because of this customs service.

The airport is home to Fargo Air National Guard Base and the Happy Hooligans of the 119th Wing (119 WG), a unit of the North Dakota Air National Guard that operates the MQ-9 Reaper.

The airport was the intended destination for the airplane carrying Buddy Holly, Ritchie Valens, and J.P. Richardson on February 3, 1959. The airplane crashed shortly after takeoff from Mason City, Iowa, killing the three musicians and the pilot.

== Facilities and aircraft ==
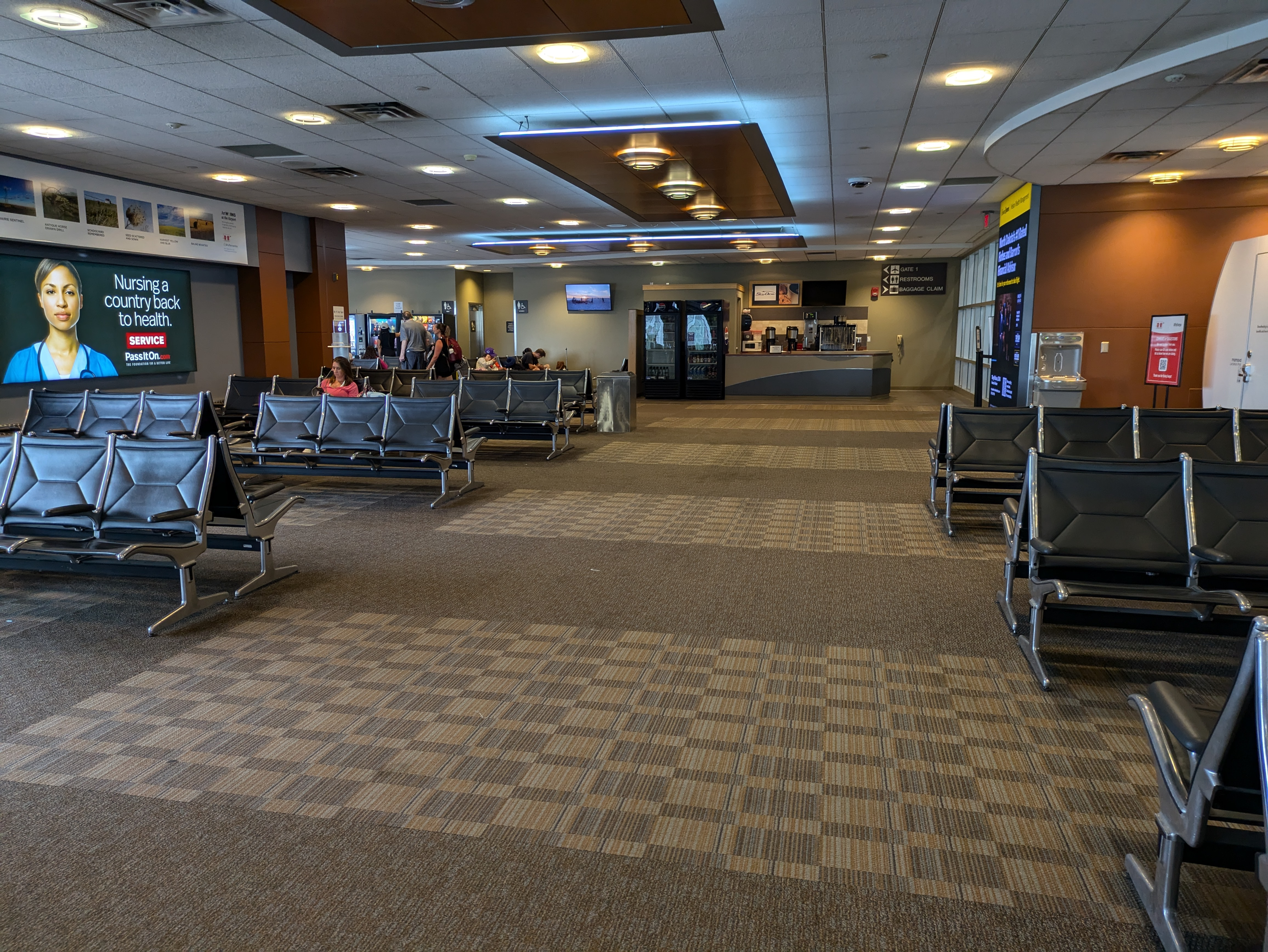
Interior of the terminal in 2024

Hector International Airport covers 2,500 acres (10 km^{2}) and has three runways: 18/36 is 9,001 x 150 ft (2,744 x 46 m), 9/27 is 6,302 x 100 ft (1,921 x 30 m), and 13/31 is 3,801 x 75 ft (1,159 x 46 m). Hector International has the longest public runway in North Dakota and can receive Boeing 747s.

The current terminal was built in 1986 and designed by Foss Associates with Thompson Consultants.

In 2008 the airport completed the passenger terminal expansion and update that had begun in October 2006. The $15.5 million project designed by TL Stroh Architects updated the terminal and added a fifth gate, an additional baggage claim and expanded the security checkpoint area. TSA PreCheck was added in 2014.

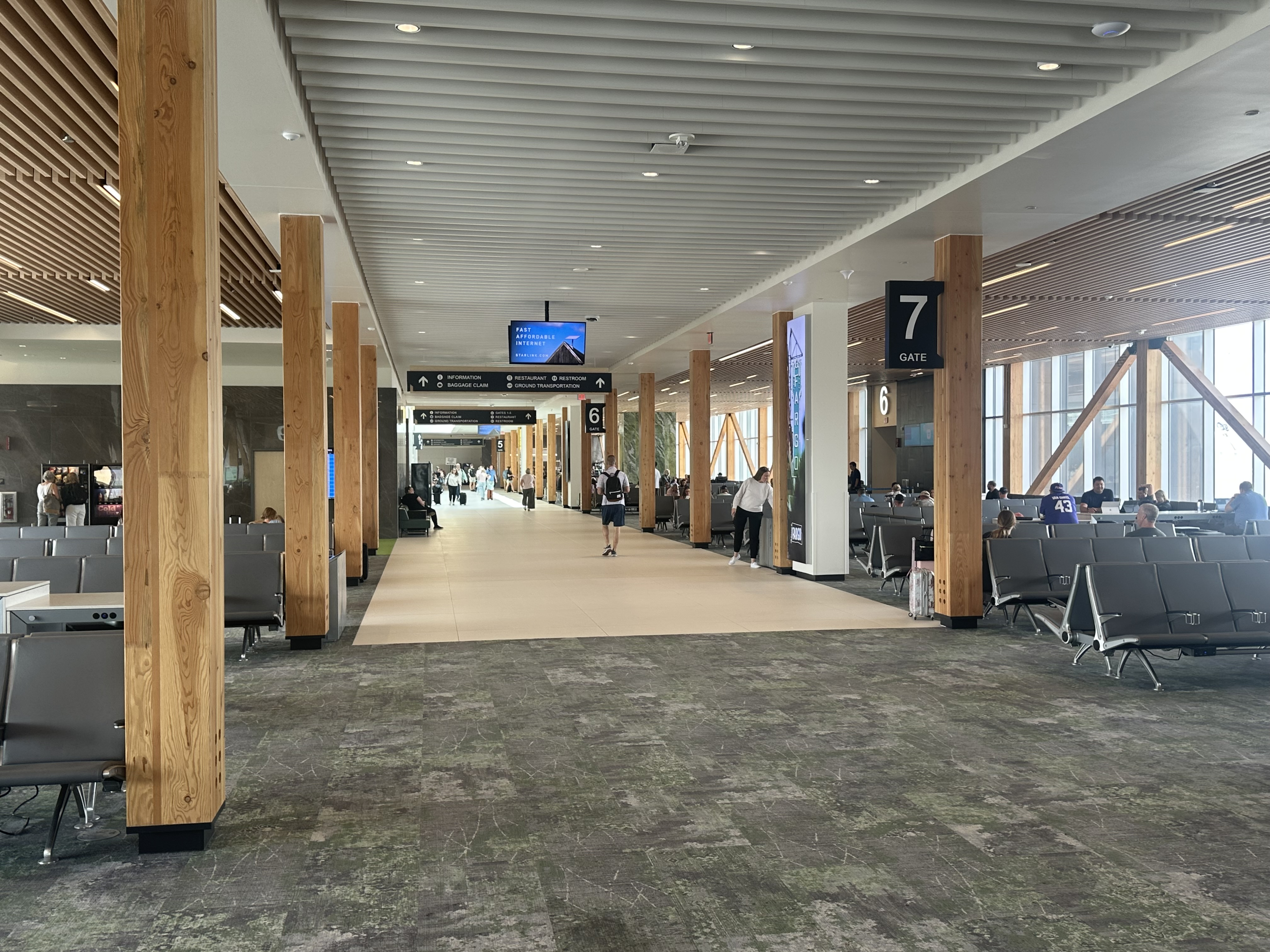
New Gates, 2026, Hector International Airport

A large terminal expansion project began in 2024. The $156 million project will add four new gates on the east side of the existing building, bringing the terminal's total number of gates to nine, as well as renovate existing portions of the terminal. The project will also increase seating, add new post-security concession areas, and expand the facility's security checkpoint. The new gates opened in 2026 with full project completion slated for 2027.

A four-story, 1,000 space parking garage opened in August 2025. The $47 million facility features a skyway connecting the garage to the terminal building, which is expected to open in 2026.

== Airlines and destinations ==
=== Passenger ===
Airlines	Destinations	Refs
Allegiant Air	Las Vegas, Nashville, Phoenix/Mesa; Seasonal: Orlando/Sanford, St. Petersburg/Clearwater	
American Eagle	Chicago–O'Hare, Dallas/Fort Worth; Seasonal: Phoenix–Sky Harbor	
Delta Air Lines	Minneapolis/St. Paul	
Delta Connection	Atlanta, Minneapolis/St. Paul	
Frontier Airlines	Denver	
United Airlines	Denver	
United Express	Chicago–O'Hare, Denver	

Passenger destinations map
All destinations from Hector International Airport
Red = Year-round destination
Green = Seasonal destination
Blue = Future destination

=== Cargo ===
Airlines	Destinations	Refs
Alpine Air Express	Bismarck, Dickinson, Minot, Sioux Falls, Thief River Falls, Williston	
Bemidji Airlines	Bismarck, Devils Lake	
FedEx Express	Memphis	
FedEx Feeder operated by Corporate Air	Bemidji, Bismarck, Dickinson, Minot, Williston, Winnipeg	
UPS Airlines	Louisville	

Cargo destinations map
All cargo destinations from Hector International Airport
= Year-round destination
= Seasonal destination
= Future destination

== Statistics ==
=== Top destinations ===
Busiest domestic routes from FAR (February 2025 – January 2026)
Rank	City	Passengers	Carriers
1	Minneapolis/St. Paul, MN	175,520	Delta
2	Chicago–O'Hare, IL	114,170	American, United
3	Denver, CO	109,870	Frontier, United
4	Dallas/Fort Worth, TX	71,480	American
5	Phoenix-Mesa, AZ	59,020	Allegiant
6	Las Vegas, NV	18,470	Allegiant
7	Nashville, TN	13,150	Allegiant
8	Orlando–Sanford, FL	11,320	Allegiant
9	St. Petersburg/Clearwater, FL	8,210	Allegiant
10	Phoenix–Sky Harbor, AZ	7,150	American

=== Annual traffic ===
Annual passenger traffic at Fargo Airport 1998–present
Year	Passengers	Year	Passengers	Year	Passengers
1997	406,912	2007	599,168	2017	787,927
1998	384,205	2008	648,137	2018	843,582
1999	445,744	2009	697,810	2019	930,409
2000	465,636	2010	724,941	2020	478,604
2001	434,332	2011	699,549	2021	796,675
2002	484,068	2012	728,799	2022	908,075
2003	508,534	2013	797,125	2023	1,032,497
2004	506,650	2014	894,426	2024	1,092,836
2005	549,209	2015	858,982	2025	1,179,442
2006	609,731	2016	789,182		

=== Commercial airline market share ===
Airline market share (February 2025 – January 2026)
Rank	Airline	Passengers	Share
1	SkyWest Airlines	279,000	23.57%
2	Envoy Air	268,000	22.65%
3	Allegiant Airlines	220,000	18.64%
4	Delta Air Lines	197,000	16.64%
5	United Airlines	82,010	6.93%
	Other Airlines	137,000	11.57%

== Ground transportation ==
As of 2022, there is no public transit service to Hector International Airport. The closest MATBUS bus stop is located over a mile away.

== Climate ==
Hector International Airport

Climate chart (precipitation, max. and min. temperature)
J	F	M	A	M	J	J	A	S	O	N	D
24 −13 −16	33 −8 −15	27 0 −10	85 18 −1	114 26 5	140 28 14	65 30 18	59 27 17	57 24 12	57 15 1	14 5 −4	30 −11 −13
- █ Average max. and min. temperatures in °C
- █ Precipitation totals in mm
Imperial conversion
J	F	M	A	M	J	J	A	S	O	N	D
0.9 9 3	1.3 18 5	1.1 32 14	3.3 64 30	4.5 79 41	5.5 82 57	2.6 86 64	2.3 81 63	2.2 75 54	2.2 59 34	0.6 41 25	1.2 12 9
- █ Average max. and min. temperatures in °F
- █ Precipitation totals in inches

== UFO encounter ==
On October 1, 1948, the Gorman dogfight, a widely publicized UFO encounter, took place over Hector International Airport.

== See also ==
- Fargo Air Museum
