= Eveleth–Virginia Municipal Airport =

Eveleth-Virginia Airport
- IATA: EVM; ICAO: KEVM; FAA LID: KVM

Summary
- Airport type: Public
- Owner: Cities of Eveleth and Virginia
- Serves: Eveleth, Minnesota Virginia, Minnesota
- Elevation AMSL: 1,376 ft / 419.4 m
- Coordinates: 47°25′27.0000″N 092°29′47.000″W

Map
- Location of airport in Minnesota/United States KEVM (the United States)

Runways
Direction	Length		Surface
Direction	ft	m	Surface
9/27	4,000 x 75	1,219 x 23	Asphalt
14/32	2,050 x 100	625 x 30	Turf

Eveleth–Virginia Municipal Airport (IATA: EVM, ICAO: KEVM, FAA LID: EVM) is a city-owned public-use airport located three miles southeast of the city of Eveleth, Minnesota

== Facilities and aircraft ==
Eveleth-Virginia Airport contains two runways, one designated 9/27 with a 4,000 x 75 ft (1,219 x 23 m) with an asphalt surface and one designated 14/32 with a 2,050 x 100 ft (625 x 30 m) with a turf surface. For the 12-month period ending June 30, 2017, the airport had 17,520 aircraft operations, an average of 48 per day: 62% transient general aviation, 29% local general aviation, and 9% air taxi. The airport housed 36 single-engine airplanes and one multi-engine airplanes.

== See also ==
- List of airports in Minnesota
