= Minneapolis–Saint Paul International Airport =

Airport in Minnesota, United States

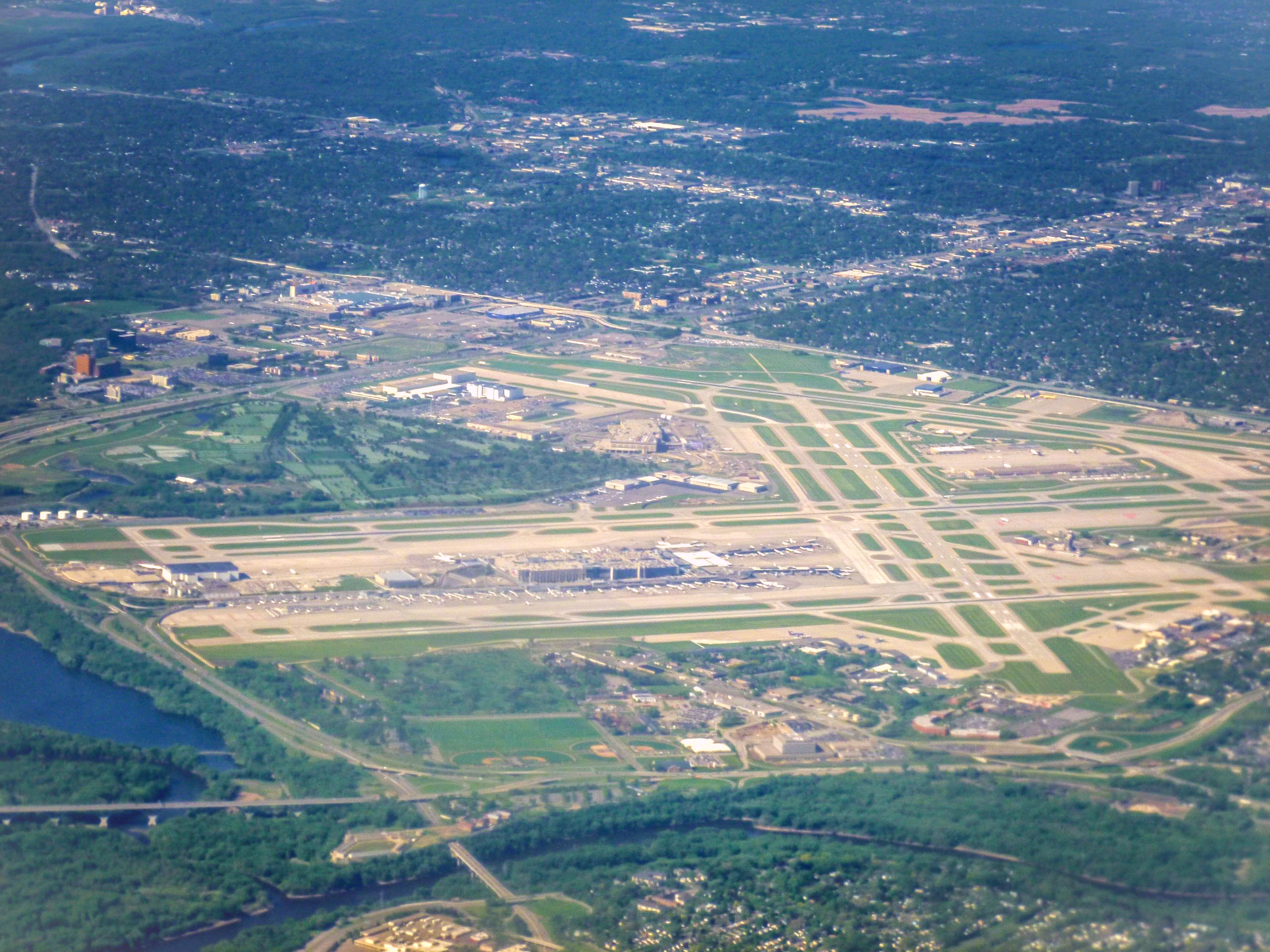
- Aerial view of MSP in May 2012
- IATA: MSP; ICAO: KMSP; FAA LID: MSP; WMO: 72658

Summary
- Airport type: Public / military
- Owner/Operator: Metropolitan Airports Commission
- Serves: Minneapolis–Saint Paul
- Location: Unorganized Territory of Fort Snelling, Minnesota, U.S.
- Opened: July 10, 1920; 106 years ago
- Hub for: Delta Air Lines; Sun Country Airlines
- Operating base for: Bemidji Airlines; Endeavor Air
- Time zone: CST (UTC−06:00)
  - Summer (DST): CDT (UTC−05:00)
- Elevation AMSL: 841 ft (256 m)
- Coordinates: 44°52′55″N 093°13′18″W
- Public transit access: Blue Line
- Website: mspairport.com

Maps
- FAA airport diagram
- Interactive map of Minneapolis–Saint Paul International Airport

Runways
Direction	Length		Surface
Direction	ft	m	Surface
4/22	11,006	3,355	Concrete
12R/30L	10,000	3,048	Concrete
12L/30R	8,200	2,499	Concrete
17/35	8,000	2,438	Concrete

Statistics (2025)
- Passengers: 36,071,627 ▼2.95%
- Aircraft movements: 342,673
- Total cargo (metric tons): 207,896
- Source: Minneapolis–Saint Paul International Airport

Minneapolis–Saint Paul International Airport (IATA: MSP, ICAO: KMSP, FAA LID: MSP) – also less commonly known as Wold–Chamberlain Field – is a joint civil-military public international airport serving the Twin Cities in the U.S. state of Minnesota. It is located in Fort Snelling Unorganized Territory and sections of the airport border the city limits of Minneapolis and Richfield; however, the airport property is not part of any city or school district. Although situated within the unorganized territory, the airport is centrally located within 10 miles (16 kilometers; 9 nautical miles) of both downtown Minneapolis and downtown Saint Paul. In addition to primarily hosting commercial flights from major American and some international airlines, the airport is also home to several United States Air Force and Minnesota Air National Guard operations. The airport is also used by a variety of air cargo operators. MSP, along with Detroit Metropolitan Airport, regularly contends for the busiest airport in the Upper Midwest.

A joint civil-military airport, MSP is home to the Minneapolis–Saint Paul International Airport Joint Air Reserve Station, supporting both Air Force Reserve Command and Air National Guard flight operations. Units stationed there include the 934th Airlift Wing (934 AW). MSP covers 2,930 acres (1,186 ha) of land. The airport generates an estimated $15.9 billion a year for the Twin Cities' economy and supports 87,000 workers.

MSP is a major hub for Delta Air Lines. It also serves as the home airport for Minnesota-based Sun Country Airlines and Endeavor Air, a Delta subsidiary. Delta Air Lines and its regional affiliates account for about 65% of the airport's passenger traffic. The airport is operated by the Metropolitan Airports Commission, which also handles the operation of six smaller airports in the region.

== History ==
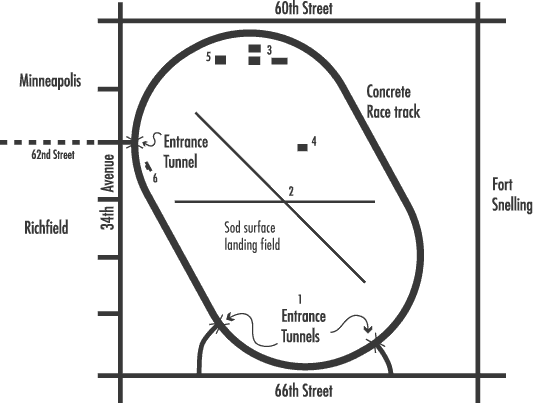
Map showing the boundaries of the old Minneapolis Speedway Airport in 1923 and the Twin Cities Speedway race track that surrounded it

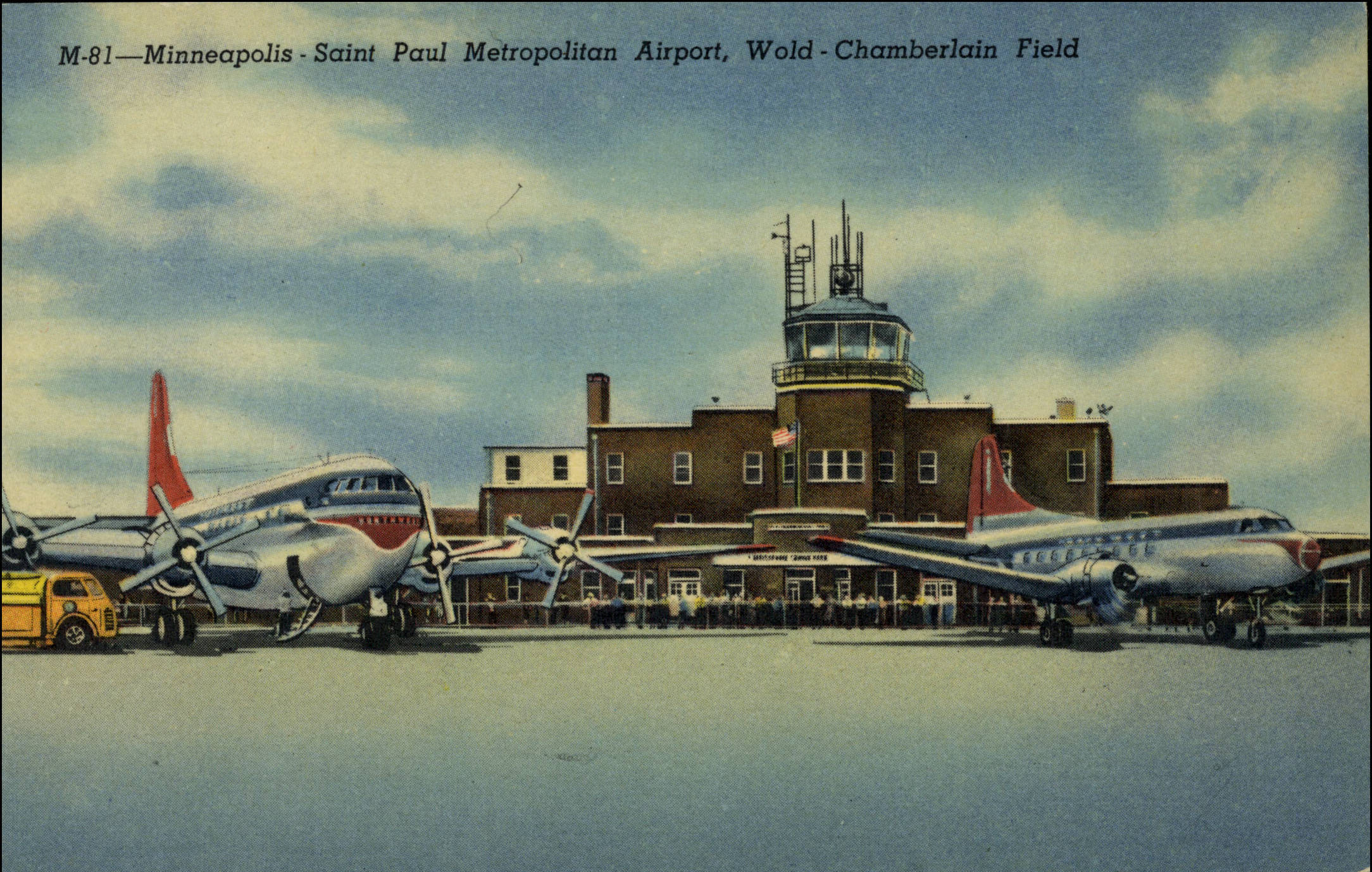
Curteich-Chicago postcard depicting Minneapolis-Saint Paul Metropolitan Airport, Wold-Chamberlain Field, c.1944

What is now known as Minneapolis–Saint Paul International Airport started in 1919 as Speedway Field when several local groups came together to take control of the former bankrupt Twin City Speedway race track. The first hangar was a wooden structure, constructed in 1920 for airmail services. The Minneapolis Park Board took possession of Speedway Field on June 1, 1928, and in 1929, passenger services began. In 1923, the airport was renamed "Wold–Chamberlain Field" for the World War I pilots Ernest Groves Wold and Cyrus Foss Chamberlain. In 1944 the site was renamed to "Minneapolis–St. Paul Metropolitan Airport/Wold-Chamberlain Field", with "International" replacing "Metropolitan" four years later. Today it is rare to see the Wold–Chamberlain portion of the name used anywhere.

=== Expansions ===
Ground was broken for the current Terminal 1 building on October 26, 1958. The US$8.5 million, 600,000-square-foot (56,000 m^{2}) terminal with 24 gates on two concourses was designed by Lyle George Landstrom. who worked for Cerny Associates. The terminal, then referred to as the New Terminal, was completed on January 13, 1962, and operations began on January 21. Pier D (formerly the Gold Concourse, now Concourse G) was completed in 1971 and Pier A (formerly the Green Concourse, now Concourse C) was completed in 1972 as part of an expansion of the terminal designed by Cerny Associates. This project also involved rebuilding the existing concourses into bi-level structures equipped with holding rooms and jet bridges. The Gold Concourse was expanded in 1986 and included the airport's first moving walkway. Concourses A and B opened on June 1, 2002, as part of a $250 million terminal expansion designed by Minneapolis-based Architectural Alliance. The final component of the project included a $17.5 million extension of Concourse C consisting of six additional gates, which opened on October 31, 2002.

Terminal 2 was first built in 1986 and then rebuilt in 2001. It is used mostly for charter and low cost airlines, including Minnesota-based Sun Country and Southwest, but is also used for Condor, Frontier, and Icelandair. The terminal has since been expanded and has a total of 14 gates. The colored labeling system for concourses in both terminals was replaced beginning in 2000 with the current system of lettered concourses.

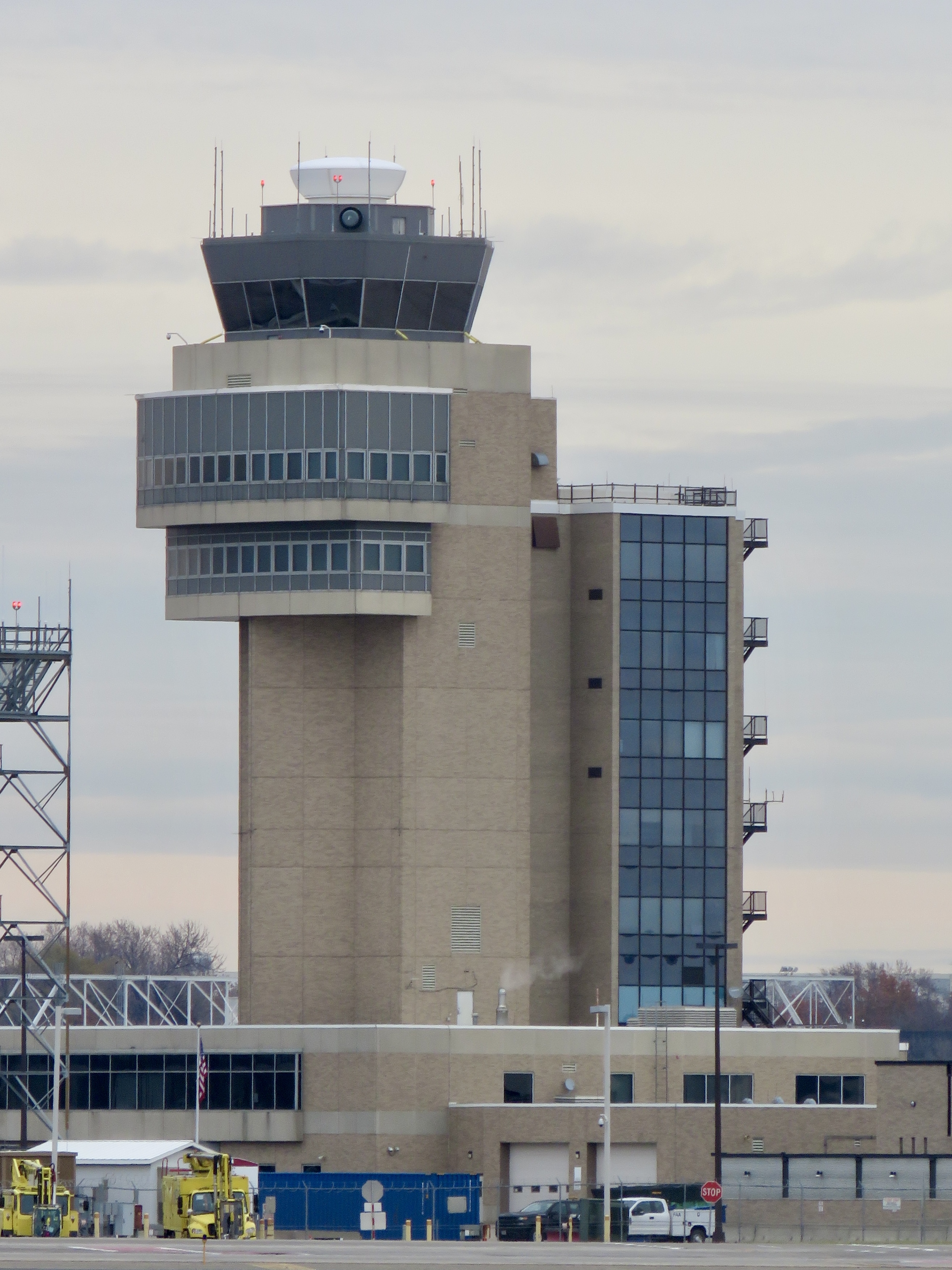
Air traffic control tower at the airport

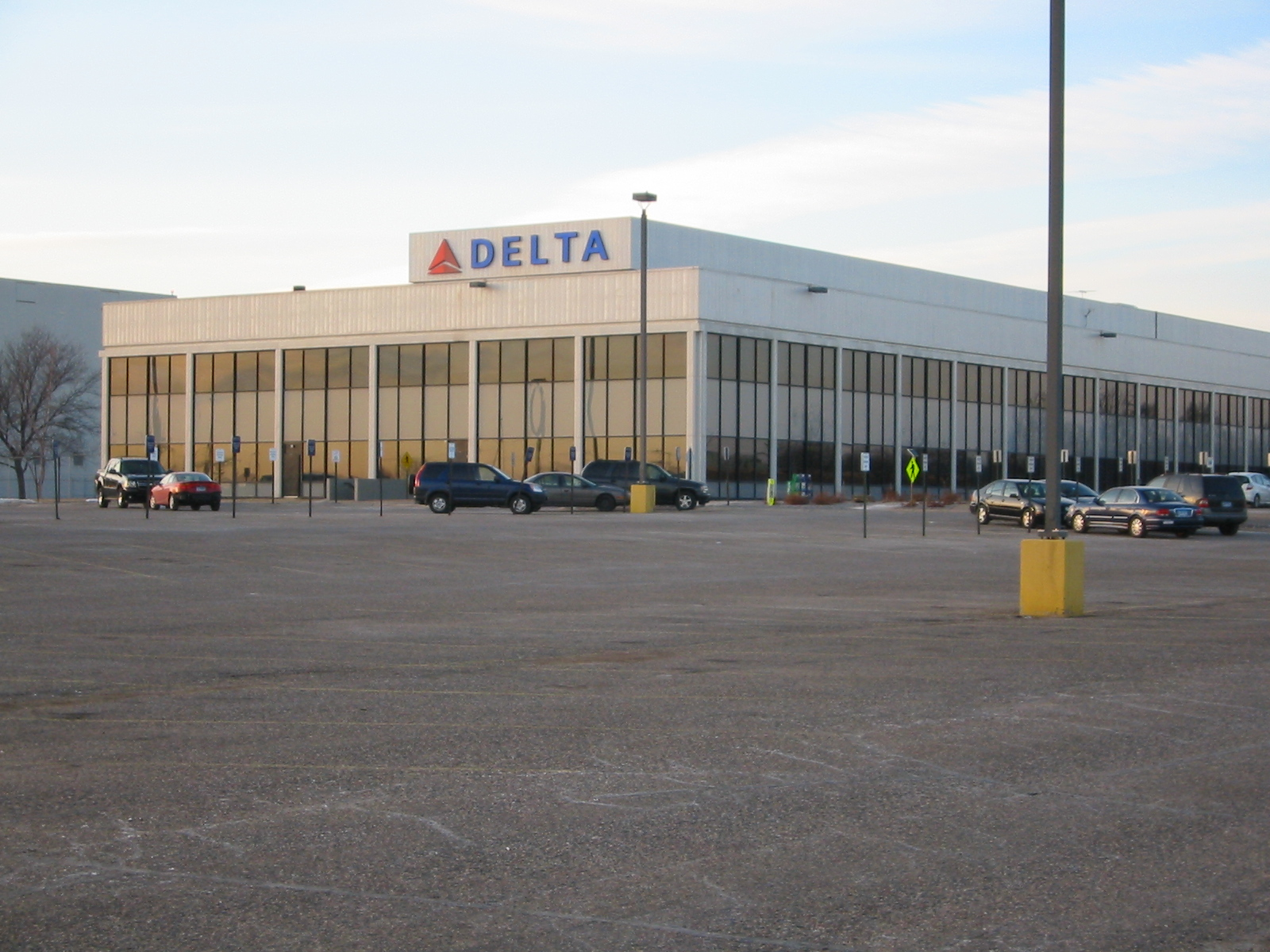
Delta Airlines Building C

=== Recent history ===
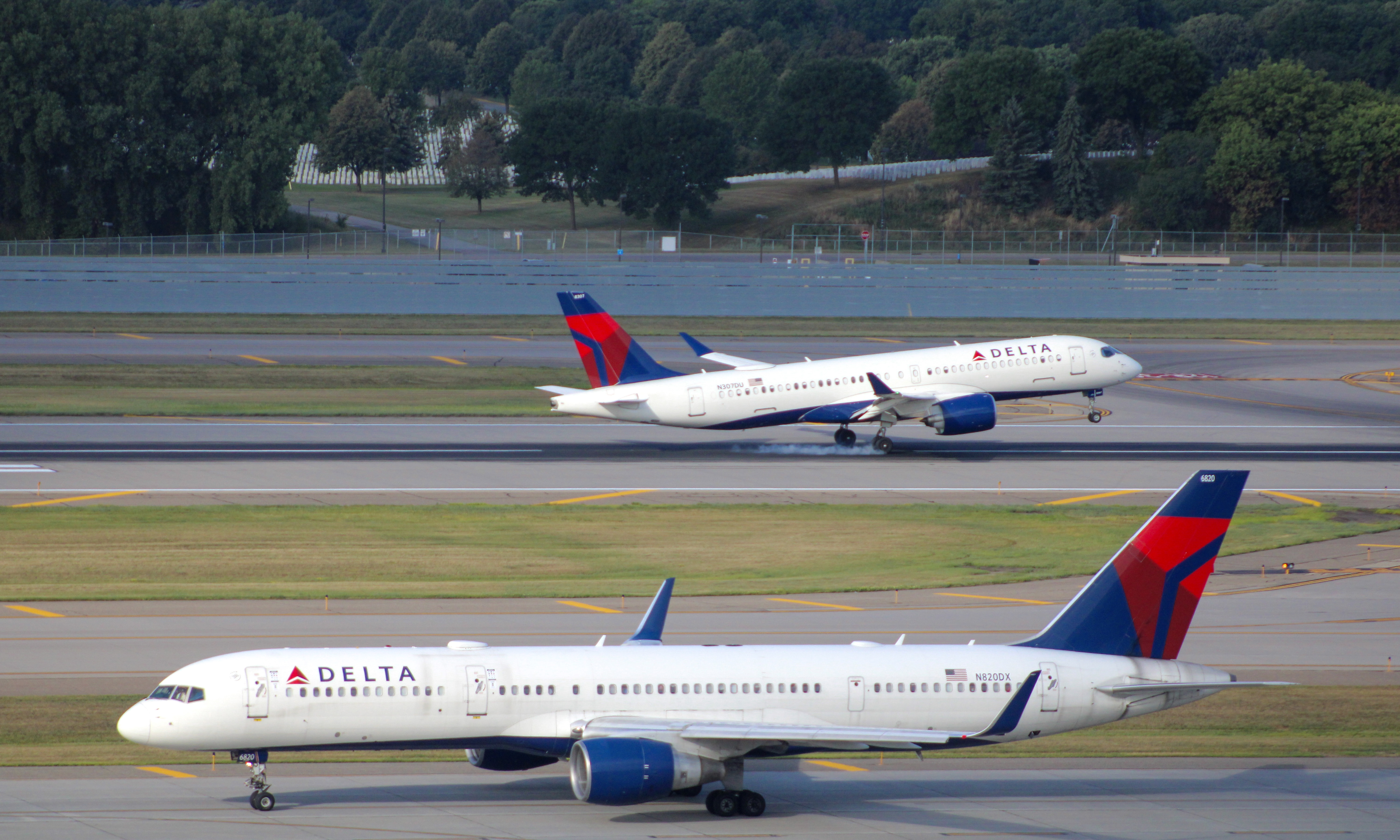
Delta A220-300 landing at MSP with a Delta 757-200 taxiing in the foreground

Due in part to aircraft noise in south Minneapolis, the Highland Park neighborhood in St. Paul, and surrounding suburbs, proposals were made in the 1990s to build a new airport on the fringes of the Twin Cities metro in Dakota County to handle larger jets and more international traffic. Minneapolis, St. Paul, and other neighboring cities were concerned that such a move would have a negative economic impact, so an arrangement was made where the Metropolitan Airports Commission would outfit many homes in the vicinity of the airport with sound insulation and air conditioning so that indoor noise could be reduced. A citizen group named ROAR (Residents Opposed to Airport Racket) was created in 1998 and helped push the MAC to make these concessions. Later, in 2004, the MAC voted to reduce funding for the soundproofing projects, saying in part that the economic climate had turned in the wake of the September 11 attacks. Minneapolis Mayor R. T. Rybak, who had been a founding member of ROAR, promised that the city would challenge the changes. In 2005, the cities of Minneapolis, Eagan, and Richfield and the Minneapolis Public Housing Authority filed a lawsuit against the MAC, which was settled with a Consent Decree in 2007. The terms in the Consent Decree specified levels of sound insulation for homes within a fixed boundary of projected aircraft noise exposure around MSP. Upon the completion of the noise mitigation program in 2014, more than 15,000 single-family homes and 3,303 multi-family units around MSP were provided noise mitigation at cost of $95 million. In July 2015, in order to reduce the potential accident risk, the FAA issued a runway suspension for landings at runway 35 during simultaneous takeoffs from runway 30L. This order would also include the prohibited use of the runway with bad weather conditions.

A 2022 J.D. Power survey concluded that with ranking the largest US and Canadian airports on a 1,000 point scale based on traveler satisfaction, the airport received a score of 800, ranking it the best airport in the US and Canada. MSP's high ranking was accredited to its recently updated facilities.

In 2023, Minneapolis-Saint Paul was recognized by analytics company Cirium as the world's most punctual international airport, having on-time departure and arrival rates of 84.44% and 84.62% respectively.

== Facilities ==
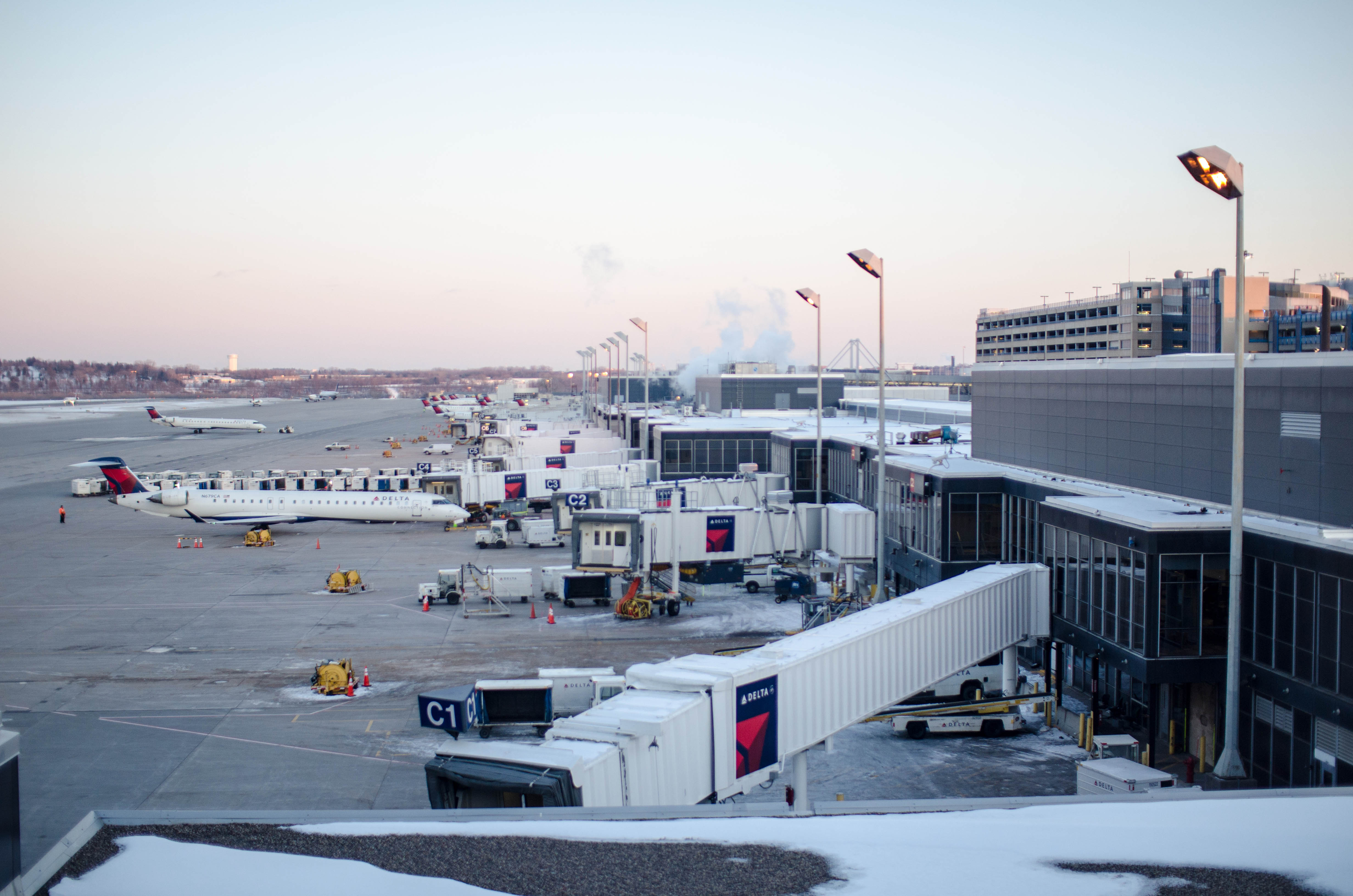
Delta Air Lines jets parked at Concourse C

=== Terminals ===
Minneapolis–Saint Paul International Airport has two terminals with a total of 131 gates. Terminal 1 is named after aviator Charles Lindbergh, who was raised in Minnesota and Terminal 2 is named after Vice President Hubert Humphrey, who also had represented Minnesota in Congress.

- Terminal 1 (Lindbergh) contains 117 gates across seven concourses, lettered A–G. Airlines that use Terminal 1 include Aer Lingus, Air Canada, Air France, Alaska, American, Delta, Denver Air Connection, Discover Airlines, KLM, United, and WestJet.
- Terminal 2 (Humphrey) contains 16 gates across one concourse, lettered H. Airlines that uses Terminal 2 are Frontier, Icelandair, Southwest Airlines, and Sun Country Airlines.

International arrivals and departures are processed in Concourse G in Terminal 1, and in Terminal 2.

The two terminals are located about one mile (1.6 km) apart and accessed from separate exits of Minnesota State Highway 5. The arrangement can be confusing for some drivers, as the terminals are not connected within the airport facilities, meaning that taking the wrong exit can cause a delay of several minutes, and require the use of light rail public transit or the roadway to travel between terminals. In 2010, signage along Highway 5 was updated to make it more clear which airlines serve each terminal.

=== Ground transportation ===
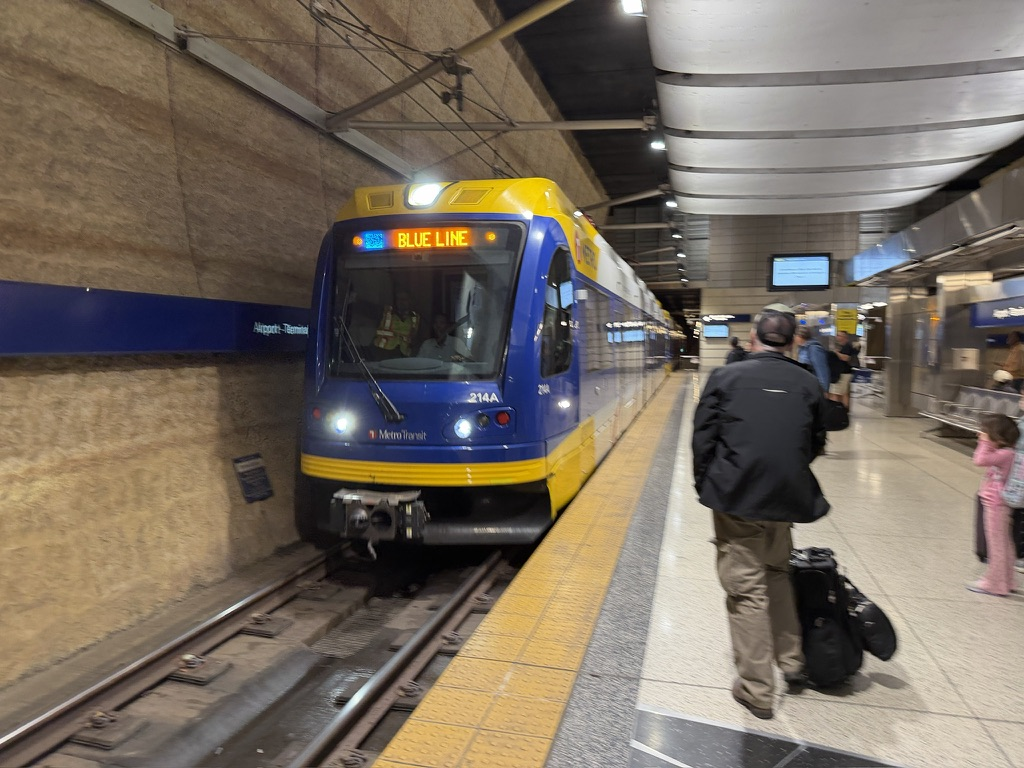
Terminal 1 light rail station in 2025

The airport is served by Minnesota State Highway 5, Minnesota State Highway 62, Minnesota State Highway 77, and Interstate 494.

Metro Transit operates the Blue Line, a light rail route serving both terminals. Passengers traveling between Terminal 1 and Terminal 2 may ride free of charge, with inter-terminal service operating at all hours, including overnight when the remainder of the Blue Line is closed. Beyond the airport, the Blue Line provides service to downtown Minneapolis and the Mall of America in nearby Bloomington. Metro Transit also operates bus route 54 to Saint Paul.

=== Military facilities ===
The Minneapolis–Saint Paul International Airport Joint Air Reserve Station at MSP is home to the 934th Airlift Wing (934 AW), an Air Force Reserve Command (AFRC) unit and the 133d Airlift Wing (133 AW) of the Minnesota Air National Guard. Both units fly the C-130 Hercules and are operationally-gained by the Air Mobility Command (AMC). The 934th consists of over 1,300 military personnel, of whom approximately 250 are full-time Active Guard and Reserve (AGR) and Air Reserve Technician (ART) personnel. The 133rd is similarly composed, making for a total military presence of over 2,600 full-time and part-time personnel.

The 934 AW serves as the "host" wing for the installation, which also includes lodging/billeting, officers club, Base Exchange (BX) and other morale, welfare and recreation (MWR) facilities for active, reserve/national guard and retired military personnel and their families.

== Runways ==
Runways at MSP
Runway	Length / width	Runway	Surface	Equipment
04 →	11,006 by 150 ft 3,355 by 46 m	← 22	Concrete	Runway 04/22: High intensity runway edge lighting [AN(TE HI)]. Both equipped with a precision approach path indicator (PAPI) system. RWY22 : LOC, RNAV // RWY04 : LOC, RNAV, VOR/DME
17 →	8,000 by 150 ft 2,438 by 46 m	← 35	Concrete	Runway 17/35: Touchdown and centerline lights and a PAPI system. Runway 35: ILS CAT II-III. RWY35 : RNAV // RWY17 : LOC
12R →	10,000 by 200 ft 3,048 by 61 m	← 30L	Concrete	Runway 12R/30L: a PAPI system. 12R: ILS CAT II-III. 30L: ILS CAT II. RWY30L : ILS, RNAV, RNP // RWY12R : ILS, RNAV, RNP
12L →	8,200 by 150 ft 2,499 by 46 m	← 30R	Concrete	30R: high intensity runway edge lighting [AN(TE HI)]. 12L: ILS CAT II-III; Both: a PAPI system. RWY30R : ILS, RNAV, RNP // RWY12L : ILS, RNAV, RNP

== Airlines and destinations ==
=== Passenger ===
Airlines	Destinations
Air Canada	Seasonal: Montréal–Trudeau, Toronto–Pearson
Air Canada Express	Toronto–Pearson; Seasonal: Montréal–Trudeau
Air France	Seasonal: Paris–Charles de Gaulle
Alaska Airlines	Seattle/Tacoma; Seasonal: Anchorage, Portland (OR)
Allegiant Air	Asheville (resumes May 28, 2027), Destin/Fort Walton Beach (resumes April 14, 2027), Phoenix/Mesa (resumes April 14, 2027), Sarasota (resumes April 14, 2027)
American Airlines	Charlotte, Dallas/Fort Worth, Miami, Phoenix–Sky Harbor; Seasonal: Chicago–O'Hare, Philadelphia
American Eagle	Chicago–O'Hare, Philadelphia, Washington–National
Delta Air Lines	Amsterdam, Anchorage, Atlanta, Austin, Baltimore, Billings, Bismarck, Boise, Boston, Bozeman, Calgary, Cancún, Charleston (SC), Charlotte, Chicago–O'Hare, Cincinnati, Cleveland, Columbus–Glenn, Dallas/Fort Worth, Denver, Destin/Fort Walton Beach, Detroit, Dublin, Fargo, Fort Lauderdale, Fort Myers, Glacier Park/Kalispell, Grand Rapids, Hartford, Honolulu, Houston–Intercontinental, Indianapolis, Jacksonville (FL), Kansas City, Las Vegas, London–Heathrow, Los Angeles, Madison, Mexico City–Benito Juárez, Miami, Milwaukee, Missoula, Nashville, New Orleans, New York–JFK, New York–LaGuardia, Newark, Orange County, Orlando, Paris–Charles de Gaulle, Philadelphia, Phoenix–Sky Harbor, Pittsburgh, Portland (OR), Raleigh/Durham, Rome–Fiumicino, Sacramento, Salt Lake City, San Antonio, San Diego, San Francisco, San Jose (CA), San Juan, Savannah, Seattle/Tacoma, Seoul–Incheon, Sioux Falls, Spokane, St. Louis, Tampa, Tokyo–Haneda, Tri-Cities (WA), Vancouver, Washington–National; Seasonal: Albuquerque, Asheville, Aruba, Belize City, Buffalo, Copenhagen, Cozumel, Fairbanks, Grand Cayman, Harlingen, Hayden/Steamboat Springs, Jackson Hole, Kahului, Liberia (CR), Mazatlán, Montego Bay, Myrtle Beach, Nassau, Palm Springs, Portland (ME), Providence, Providenciales, Puerto Vallarta, Punta Cana, Rapid City, Reno/Tahoe, Reykjavík–Keflavík, San José del Cabo, Sarasota, Syracuse, Toronto–Pearson, Tucson, West Palm Beach
Delta Connection	Aberdeen (SD), Appleton, Austin, Bemidji, Bismarck, Brainerd, Cedar Rapids/Iowa City, Chicago–Midway, Cincinnati, Cleveland, Columbus–Glenn, Des Moines, Duluth, Escanaba, Fargo, Fayetteville/Bentonville, Fort Wayne, Grand Forks, Grand Rapids, Green Bay, Hibbing/Chisholm, International Falls, Iron Mountain, Kansas City, Knoxville, Louisville, Madison, Marquette, Memphis, Milwaukee, Minot, Montréal–Trudeau, Mosinee/Wausau, Norfolk, Oklahoma City, Omaha, Pittsburgh, Rapid City, Rhinelander, Richmond, Rochester (MN), Sault Ste. Marie (MI), Sioux Falls, South Bend, St. Louis, Toronto–Pearson, Tri-Cities (WA), Washington–Dulles, Watertown (SD), White Plains, Wichita, Winnipeg; Seasonal: Burlington (VT), Chicago–O'Hare, Colorado Springs, Eagle/Vail, Indianapolis, Traverse City
Denver Air Connection	Ironwood, Thief River Falls
Discover Airlines	Seasonal: Frankfurt
Frontier Airlines	Dallas/Fort Worth, Denver; Seasonal: Atlanta, Las Vegas, Orlando, Phoenix–Sky Harbor
Icelandair	Reykjavík–Keflavík
KLM	Amsterdam
Southwest Airlines	Austin, Baltimore, Chicago–Midway, Denver, Nashville, Phoenix–Sky Harbor, St. Louis; Seasonal: Dallas–Love, Fort Myers, Las Vegas, Orlando, Tampa
Sun Country Airlines	Boston, Cancún, Dallas/Fort Worth, Denver, Fort Myers, Gulf Shores (begins April 16, 2027), Las Vegas, Los Angeles, Nashville, Newark, Orlando, Phoenix–Sky Harbor, Portland (OR), San Diego, San Francisco, San Juan, Seattle/Tacoma, Tampa; Seasonal: Atlanta, Aruba, Baltimore, Belize City, Charlotte, Chicago–O'Hare, Cincinnati, Columbus–Glenn, Cozumel, Destin/Fort Walton Beach (ends April 13, 2027), Detroit, Fort Lauderdale, Grand Cayman, Gulfport/Biloxi, Harlingen, Houston–Hobby, Indianapolis, Ixtapa/Zihuatanejo, Jacksonville (FL), Liberia (CR), Mazatlán, Melbourne/Orlando (resumes January 27, 2027), Miami, Milwaukee, Montego Bay, Myrtle Beach, New Orleans, New York–JFK, Palm Springs, Philadelphia, Phoenix/Mesa (ends April 13, 2027), Providenciales, Puerto Vallarta, Punta Cana, Punta Gorda (FL), Raleigh/Durham, Reno/Tahoe, Roatán, San José del Cabo, Sarasota (ends April 13, 2027), Savannah, St. Maarten, St. Petersburg/Clearwater, St. Thomas, Syracuse, Tucson, Washington–Dulles
United Airlines	Chicago–O'Hare, Denver, Houston–Intercontinental, San Francisco; Seasonal: Newark
United Express	Houston–Intercontinental, Newark, Washington–Dulles; Seasonal: Chicago–O'Hare, Denver
WestJet	Calgary, Edmonton, Saskatoon
WestJet Encore	Regina

=== Cargo ===
Airlines	Destinations	Refs.
Amazon Air	Cincinnati, Fort Worth/Alliance, San Bernardino,	
Bemidji Airlines	Alexandria, Bemidji, Brainerd, Duluth, Eveleth, International Falls, Grand Rapids (MN), La Crosse, Rice Lake, Thief River Falls	
DHL Aviation	Cincinnati, Omaha, Thief River Falls, Winnipeg	
FedEx Express	Fort Worth/Alliance, Indianapolis, Memphis	
FedEx Feeder	Bemidji, Duluth, Thief River Falls	
UPS Airlines	Alexandria, Bemidji, Brainerd, Chicago/Rockford, Detroit Lakes, Duluth, Fergus Falls, International Falls, La Crosse, Louisville, Marshall, Philadelphia, Rice Lake, Thief River Falls, Wadena, Winnipeg, Winona	

== Statistics ==
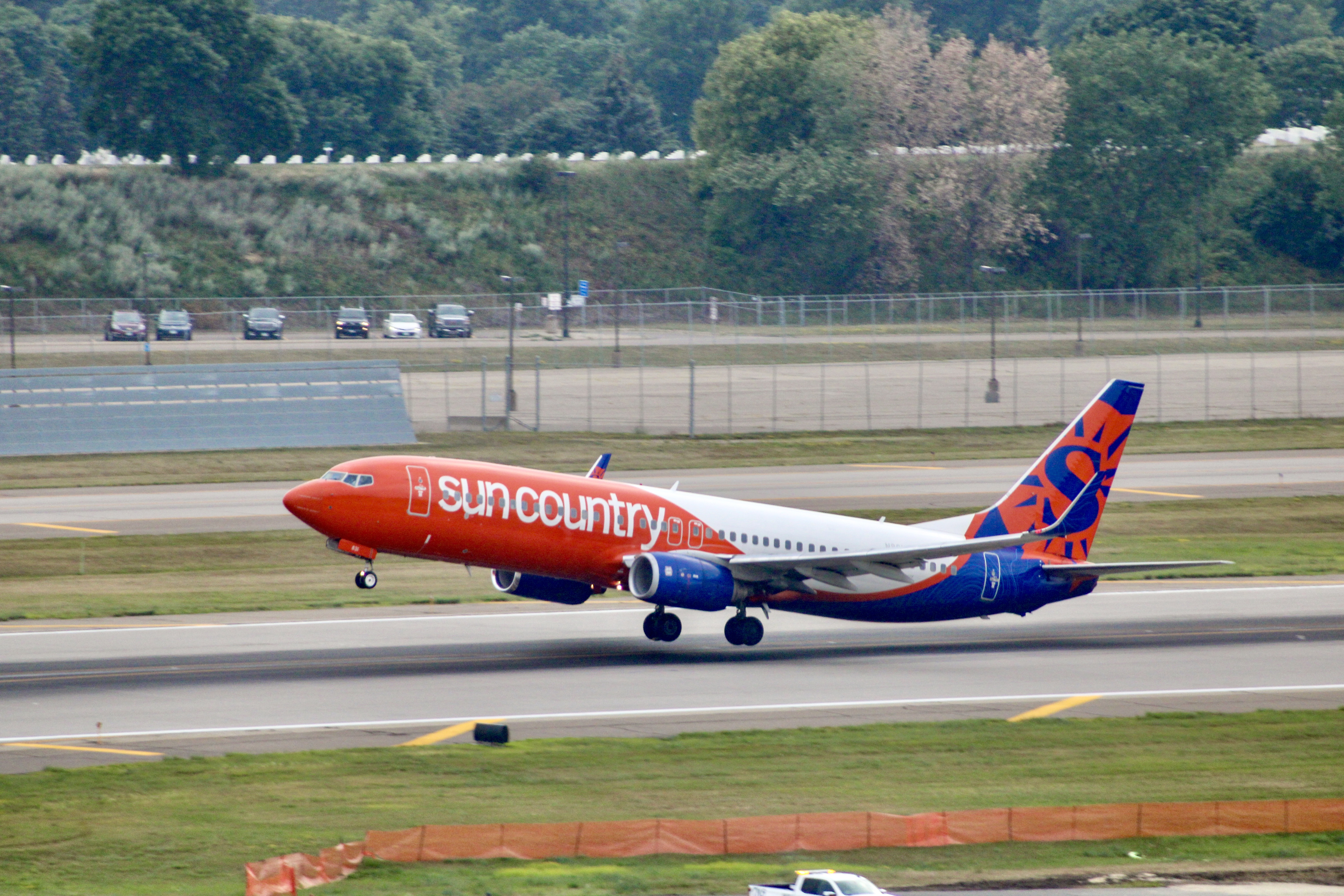
A Sun Country 737-800 departing MSP in July 2021

=== Top domestic destinations ===
Busiest domestic routes from MSP (September 2025 – August 2026)
Rank	Airport	Passengers	Carriers
1	Denver, Colorado	856,376	Delta, Frontier, Southwest, Sun Country, United
2	Chicago-O'Hare, Illinois	635,957	American, Delta, Sun Country, United
3	Phoenix–Sky Harbor, Arizona	585,647	American, Delta, Southwest, Sun Country
4	Atlanta, Georgia	575,707	Delta, Frontier, Spirit, Sun Country
5	Orlando, Florida	502,589	Delta, Sun Country
6	Seattle/Tacoma, Washington	494,984	Alaska, Delta, Sun Country
7	Las Vegas, Nevada	461,175	Delta, Southwest, Sun Country
8	Dallas/Fort Worth, Texas	450,506	American, Delta, Frontier, Sun Country
9	Los Angeles, California	442,975	Delta, Sun Country
10	Boston, Massachusetts	340,454	Delta, Sun Country

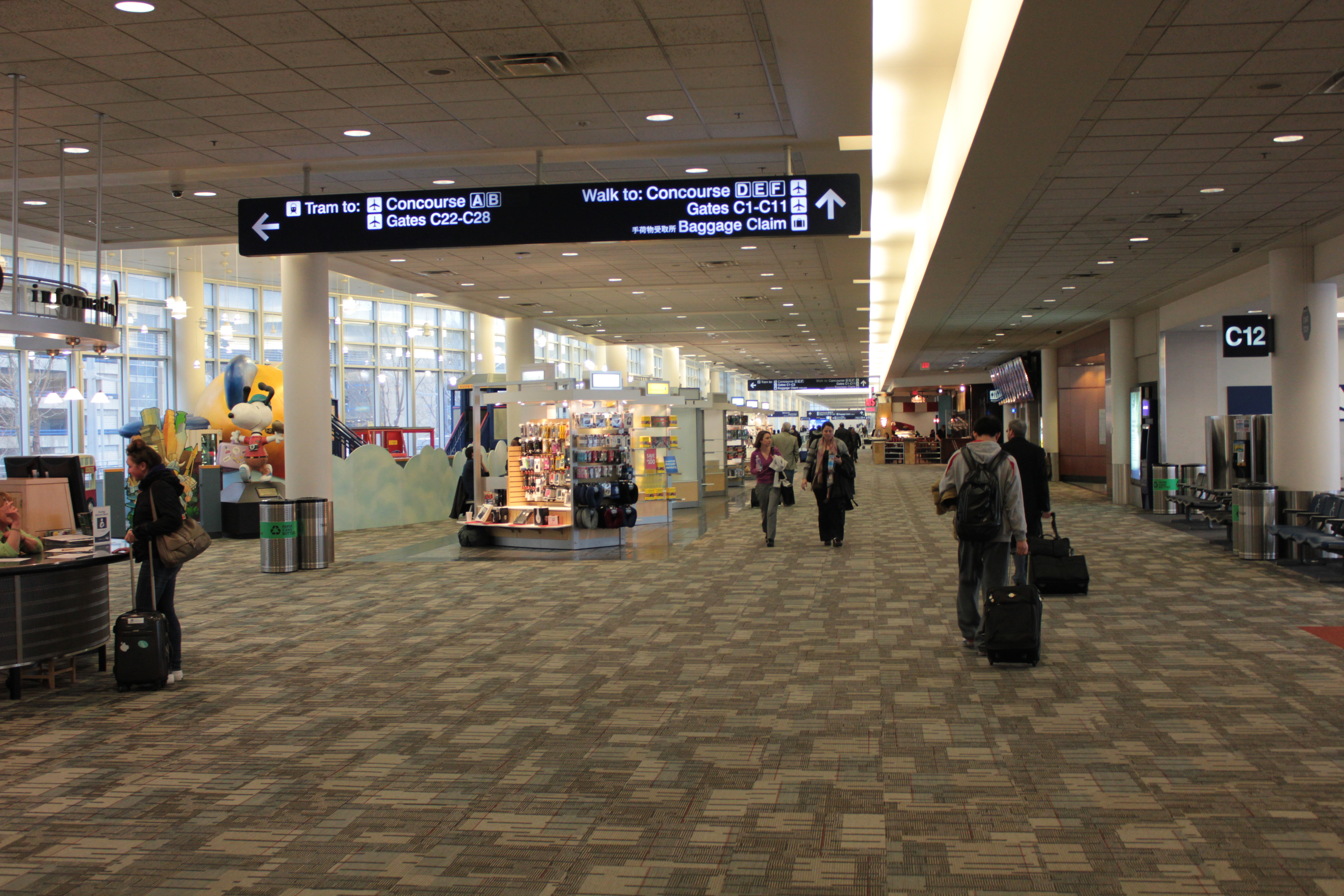
Terminal 1

=== Top international destinations ===
Busiest international routes from MSP (September 2025 – August 2026)
Rank	Airport	Passengers	Carriers
1	Amsterdam, Netherlands	513,031	Delta, KLM
2	Cancún, Mexico	390,465	Delta, Sun Country
3	Paris, France	237,381	Air France, Delta
4	Toronto, Canada	188,161	Air Canada, Delta, Sun Country
5	Calgary, Canada	174,334	Delta, Westjet
6	Seoul-Incheon, South Korea	166,447	Delta
7	Vancouver, Canada	165,288	Delta, Sun Country
8	Dublin, Ireland	164,790	Aer Lingus, Delta
9	Tokyo-Haneda, Japan	160,416	Delta
10	London–Heathrow, United Kingdom	157,823	Delta

=== Airline market share ===
Largest airlines at MSP (September 2025 – August 2026)
Rank	Airline	Passengers	Market share
1	Delta Air Lines	24,556,068	71.5%
2	Sun Country Airlines	3,682,393	10.7%
3	United Airlines	1,553,677	4.5%
4	American Airlines	1,474,799	4.3%
5	Southwest Airlines	1,451,041	4.2%
	Other airlines	1,600,000	4.7%

=== Annual traffic ===
Annual passenger traffic (emplaned + deplaned) at MSP, (2001–2025)
Year	Passengers	Year	Passengers	Year	Passengers
2001	31,766,745	2011	31,941,954	2021	24,486,111
2002	30,964,275	2012	31,984,568	2022	30,575,989
2003	32,585,824	2013	32,761,633	2023	34,141,627
2004	35,390,761	2014	34,188,594	2024	36,192,001
2005	36,349,451	2015	35,541,788	2025	35,048,734
2006	34,791,498	2016	36,540,000	2026	
2007	34,247,981	2017	36,984,134	2027	
2008	33,037,322	2018	37,043,682	2028	
2009	31,379,401	2019	38,476,137	2029	
2010	31,392,479	2020	14,271,214	2030	

== Accidents and incidents ==
- On March 7, 1950, Northwest Orient Airlines Flight 307, a Martin 2-0-2 diverted from Rochester International Airport crashed 5 km northwest of MSP after first hitting a 70 foot high flagpole with its left wing on final approach, 8/10 of a mile from the touchdown point, in blinding snow. The left wing eventually detached and the aircraft dived and crashed into a house. All 13 passengers and crew and two children in the house were killed. A loss of visual reference to the ground on approach was the probable cause.
- On May 10, 2005, Northwest Flight 1495, a McDonnell Douglas DC-9, suffered a valve fracture and lost hydraulic pressure in its right engine shortly after takeoff from John Glenn Columbus International Airport en route to MSP. The aircraft performed a successful emergency landing at MSP, but began experiencing steering problems and a loss of the brakes while taxiing to the gate, resulting in it colliding with the wing of an Airbus A319-114 at approximately 16 mph. Eight injuries were reported among the crew and passengers of both planes and the ground crew.

== See also ==
- Blue Line
- List of airports in Minnesota
- Metro Transit
- Minneapolis–St. Paul Airport Trams
- Minnesota World War II Army Airfields
- St. Paul Union Depot
- Larry Craig scandal
