= Corporate Air =

Airline in the United States

IATA	ICAO	Call sign
—	CPT	AIR SPUR
- Founded: 1981
- Hubs: Billings
- Secondary hubs: Casper; Fargo; Great Falls; Honolulu; Salt Lake City
- Subsidiaries: Merlin Airways
- Fleet size: 9
- Headquarters: Billings, Montana, United States
- Website: corporateair.net

Corporate Air is an airline based in Billings, Montana, United States. It was established in 1981 and operates primarily domestic scheduled cargo services, feeder service on behalf of FedEx Express, as well as the United States Postal Service. Its main base is Billings Logan International Airport.

In September 2025, Corporate Air filed for Chapter 11 bankruptcy protection in an effort to finalize a sale of itself to Vantage AGC.

== Fleet ==
=== Current fleet ===
As of August 2025, Corporate Air operates the following aircraft:

Corporate Air fleet
Aircraft	In service	Orders	Notes
Cessna 408 SkyCourier	9	—	
Total	9	—	

=== Former fleet ===
The Corporate Air fleet included the following aircraft in October 2011:

- 4 Raytheon Beech 1900C Airliner
- 37 Cessna Caravan 675
- 2 Shorts 330-100

and (as of January 2005)

- 1 Dornier 228-212
- 1 Raytheon Beech King Air 200
- 1 De Havilland Canada DHC-6 Twin Otter Series 300
- 5 Embraer EMB-120 Brasilia (as of June 2009)
- 4 Cessna 208 Caravan
