= Bemidji Airlines =

Airline of the United States

IATA	ICAO	Call sign
CH	BMJ	BEMIDJI
- Founded: 1946
- AOC #: BEMA052A
- Operating bases: Minneapolis-St. Paul International Airport; Hector International Airport; Denver International Airport
- Fleet size: 46
- Headquarters: Bemidji, Minnesota, U.S.
- Key people: Tracie Walter (President); Christine Mills (Vice President)
- Website: bemidjiaviation.com

Bemidji Airlines (Bemidji Aviation Services Inc) is an American airline based in Bemidji, Minnesota, United States. It operates domestic cargo flights, as well as extensive charter and air taxi services. Its main base is Bemidji Regional Airport, with hubs/bases at Minneapolis-Saint Paul International Airport, Denver International Airport, and Hector International Airport (Fargo).

== History ==
The airline was established in 1946 and started operations in 1947 operating a single Noorduyn Norseman aircraft. From 1981 to 1991, the airline operated with scheduled service from Bemidji; Thief River Falls; Worthington; and Mankato, all in Minnesota, to the Minneapolis–Saint Paul International Airport. In the mid-eighties, they expanded the business to include many regional cargo freight runs, and added many larger aircraft. Since 1991, primary activities have been small-feeder cargo services, passenger and cargo charters, and typical fixed-base operations at the Bemidji Airport. In January 2017, Sioux Falls, South Dakota, based Business Aviation Courier (DBA Encore Air Cargo) was acquired from BBA Aviation. Encore was sold in 2023. The company became a 100% ESOP (Employee Stock Ownership Plan) in 2007.

== Destinations ==
Bemidji Airlines operates domestic cargo/passenger services within Minnesota, Wisconsin, Colorado, Kansas, Nebraska, North Dakota, and South Dakota as well as extensive charter and air taxi work within the United States and Canada.

== Fleet ==
The Bemidji Airlines fleet consists of the following aircraft (at Mar 2020):

- 11 Beechcraft 99, 99A or C99
- 9 Fairchild Metro III Model AC227-AC
- 23 Beechcraft Queenair with Excalibur Modification
- 1 Beechcraft King Air E90
- 1 Cessna 172
