= List of airports by ICAO code: KI-KP =

List of airports by ICAO code: A - B - C - D - EB-EG - EH-EY - FA-FM - FN-FZ - G - H - ~~I~~ - J - KA-KH - KI-KP - KR-KZ - LA-LJ - LK-LZ - M - N - O - P - Q - R - SA-SC - SD-SH - SI - SJ - SK-SM - SN-SP - SQ - SS-SU - SV-SY - T - U - V - W - ~~X~~ - YA-YG - YH-YQ - YR-YZ - Z

== KI ==
| ICAO | IATA | Airport name | Community | State | Coordinates | Notes |
|---|---|---|---|---|---|---|
| KIAB | IAB | McConnell Air Force Base | Wichita | Kansas | 37°37′23″N 097°16′02″W | |
| KIAD | IAD | Washington Dulles International Airport | Dulles | Virginia | 38°56′40″N 077°27′21″W | |
| KIAG | IAG | Niagara Falls International Airport | Niagara Falls | New York | 43°06′26″N 078°56′46″W | |
| KIAH | IAH | George Bush Intercontinental Airport | Houston | Texas | 29°59′04″N 095°20′29″W | |
| KIBM | | Kimball Municipal Airport (Robert E. Arraj Field) | Kimball | Nebraska | 41°11′17″N 103°40′37″W | |
| KIBO | | Idabel Airport | Idabel | Oklahoma | 33°54′17″N 094°50′43″W | Closed |
| KICL | ICL | Schenck Field | Clarinda | Iowa | 40°43′18″N 095°01′35″W | |
| KICR | ICR | Winner Regional Airport (Bob Wiley Field) | Winner | South Dakota | 43°23′25″N 099°50′32″W | Formerly KSFD |
| KICT | ICT | Wichita Dwight D. Eisenhower National Airport | Wichita | Kansas | 37°39′00″N 097°25′59″W | |
| KIDA | IDA | Idaho Falls Regional Airport | Idaho Falls | Idaho | 43°30′49″N 112°04′15″W | |
| KIDG | IDG | Ida Grove Municipal Airport | Ida Grove | Iowa | 42°19′57″N 095°26′42″W | |
| KIDI | | Indiana County-Jimmy Stewart Airport | Indiana | Pennsylvania | 40°37′56″N 079°06′20″W | |
| KIDL | | Indianola Municipal Airport | Indianola | Mississippi | 33°29′09″N 090°40′44″W | |
| KIDP | | Independence Municipal Airport | Independence | Kansas | 37°09′30″N 095°46′42″W | |
| KIEN | | Pine Ridge Airport | Pine Ridge | South Dakota | 43°01′21″N 102°30′40″W | |
| KIER | | Natchitoches Regional Airport | Natchitoches | Louisiana | 31°44′09″N 093°05′57″W | |
| KIFA | IFA | Iowa Falls Municipal Airport | Iowa Falls | Iowa | 42°28′15″N 093°16′12″W | |
| KIFP | IFP | Laughlin/Bullhead International Airport | Bullhead City | Arizona | 35°09′22″N 114°33′34″W | |
| KIGM | IGM | Kingman Airport | Kingman | Arizona | 35°15′34″N 113°56′17″W | |
| KIGQ | | Lansing Municipal Airport | Lansing | Illinois | 41°32′06″N 087°31′46″W | |
| KIGX | | Horace Williams Airport | Chapel Hill | North Carolina | 35°56′06″N 079°03′57″W | Closed |
| KIIB | | Independence Municipal Airport | Independence | Iowa | 42°27′25″N 091°56′52″W | |
| KIIY | | Washington-Wilkes County Airport | Washington | Georgia | 33°46′46″N 082°48′57″W | |
| KIJD | | Windham Airport | Willimantic | Connecticut | 41°44′39″N 072°10′49″W | |
| KIJX | | Jacksonville Municipal Airport | Jacksonville | Illinois | 39°46′28″N 090°14′19″W | |
| KIKG | | Kleberg County Airport | Kingsville | Texas | 27°33′03″N 098°01′51″W | |
| KIKK | IKK | Greater Kankakee Airport | Kankakee | Illinois | 41°04′17″N 087°50′47″W | |
| KIKV | IKV | Ankeny Regional Airport | Ankeny | Iowa | 41°41′28″N 093°33′59″W | |
| KIKW | IKW | Jack Barstow Municipal Airport | Midland | Michigan | 43°39′46″N 084°15′41″W | |
| KILE | ILE | Skylark Field | Killeen | Texas | 31°05′09″N 097°41′11″W | |
| KILG | ILG | Wilmington Airport | Wilmington | Delaware | 39°40′43″N 075°36′24″W | |
| KILL | | Old Willmar Municipal Airport | Willmar | Minnesota | 45°06′56″N 095°05′20″W | Closed |
| KILM | ILM | Wilmington International Airport | Wilmington | North Carolina | 34°16′14″N 077°54′09″W | |
| KILN | ILN | Wilmington Air Park | Wilmington | Ohio | 39°25′41″N 083°47′32″W | |
| KIML | | Imperial Municipal Airport | Imperial | Nebraska | 40°30′38″N 101°37′18″W | |
| KIMM | IMM | Immokalee Airport | Immokalee | Florida | 26°26′02″N 081°24′05″W | |
| KIMS | | Madison Municipal Airport | Madison | Indiana | 38°45′36″N 085°27′53″W | |
| KIMT | IMT | Ford Airport | Iron Mountain | Missouri | 45°49′06″N 088°06′52″W | |
| KIND | IND | Indianapolis International Airport | Indianapolis | Indiana | 39°43′02″N 086°17′40″W | |
| KINF | | Inverness Airport | Inverness | Florida | 28°48′13″N 082°19′06″W | |
| KINJ | INJ | Hillsboro Municipal Airport | Hillsboro | Texas | 32°05′01″N 097°05′50″W | |
| KINK | | Winkler County Airport | Kermit | Texas | 31°46′47″N 103°12′06″W | |
| KINL | INL | Falls International Airport | International Falls | Minnesota | 48°33′56″N 093°24′08″W | |
| KINS | | Creech Air Force Base | Indian Springs | Nevada | 36°35′32″N 115°40′00″W | |
| KINT | INT | Smith Reynolds Airport | Winston-Salem | North Carolina | 36°08′01″N 080°13′19″W | |
| KINW | INW | Winslow-Lindbergh Regional Airport | Winslow | Arizona | 35°01′19″N 110°43′21″W | |
| KIOB | | Mount Sterling-Montgomery County Airport | Mount Sterling | Kentucky | 38°03′29″N 083°58′47″W | |
| KIOW | | Iowa City Municipal Airport | Iowa City | Iowa | 41°38′21″N 091°32′47″W | |
| KIPJ | | Lincolnton-Lincoln County Regional Airport | Lincolnton | North Carolina | 35°29′00″N 081°09′40″W | |
| KIPL | | Imperial County Airport | Imperial | California | 32°50′03″N 115°34′43″W | |
| KIPT | IPT | Williamsport Regional Airport | Williamsport | Pennsylvania | 41°14′30″N 076°55′18″W | |
| KIRK | IRK | Kirksville Regional Airport | Kirksville | Missouri | 40°05′36″N 092°32′42″W | |
| KIRS | | Kirsch Municipal Airport | Sturgis | Michigan | 41°48′46″N 085°26′17″W | |
| KISB | | Sibley Municipal Airport | Sibley | Iowa | 43°22′10″N 095°45′35″W | |
| KISM | ISM | Kissimmee Gateway Airport | Kissimmee | Florida | 28°17′23″N 081°26′14″W | |
| KISN | | Sloulin Field International Airport | Williston | North Dakota | 48°10′41″N 103°38′32″W | Closed 2019 |
| KISO | | Kinston Regional Jetport (Stallings Field) | Kinston | North Carolina | 35°19′53″N 077°36′32″W | |
| KISP | ISP | Long Island MacArthur Airport | Ronkonkoma | New York | 40°47′43″N 073°06′01″W | |
| KISQ | ISQ | Schoolcraft County Airport | Manistique | Michigan | 45°58′28″N 086°10′18″W | |
| KISW | | South Wood County Airport (Alexander Field) | Wisconsin Rapids | Wisconsin | 44°21′37″N 089°50′21″W | |
| KISZ | | Cincinnati–Blue Ash Airport | Blue Ash | Ohio | 39°14′48″N 084°23′20″W | Closed |
| KITH | ITH | Ithaca Tompkins International Airport | Ithaca | New York | 42°29′29″N 076°27′31″W | |
| KITR | | Kit Carson County Airport | Burlington | Colorado | 39°14′33″N 102°17′07″W | |
| KIUA | | Canandaigua Airport | Canandaigua | New York | 42°54′26″N 077°19′18″W | |
| KIWA | AZA | Phoenix-Mesa Gateway Airport | Mesa | Arizona | 33°18′28″N 111°39′20″W | |
| KIWD | IWD | Gogebic-Iron County Airport | Ironwood | Michigan | 46°31′39″N 090°07′53″W | |
| KIWH | | Wabash Municipal Airport | Wabash | Indiana | 40°45′43″N 085°47′56″W | |
| KIWI | | Wiscasset Airport | Wiscasset | Maine | 43°57′41″N 069°42′45″W | |
| KIWS | | West Houston Airport | Katy | Texas | 29°49′06″N 095°40′21″W | |
| KIXA | | Halifax–Northampton Regional Airport | Roanoke Rapids | North Carolina | 36°19′47″N 077°38′07″W | |
| KIXD | | New Century AirCenter | Olathe | Kansas | 38°49′51″N 094°53′25″W | |
| KIYA | | Abbeville Chris Crusta Memorial Airport | Abbeville | Louisiana | 29°58′33″N 092°05′03″W | |
| KIYK | | Inyokern Airport | Inyokern | California | 35°39′31″N 117°49′46″W | |
| KIZA | | Santa Ynez Airport | Santa Ynez | California | 34°36′25″N 120°04′32″W | |
| KIZG | | Eastern Slopes Regional Airport (Fryeburg Airport) | Fryeburg | Maine | 43°59′28″N 070°56′52″W | |

== KJ ==
| ICAO | IATA | Airport name | Community | State | Coordinates | Notes |
|---|---|---|---|---|---|---|
| KJAC | JAC | Jackson Hole Airport | Jackson Hole | Wyoming | 43°36′26″N 110°44′16″W | |
| KJAN | JAN | Jackson International Airport | Jackson | Mississippi | 32°18′40″N 090°04′33″W | |
| KJAQ | | Amador County Airport | Jackson | California | 38°22′36″N 120°47′38″W | |
| KJAS | JAS | Jasper County Airport | Jasper | Texas | 30°53′09″N 094°02′06″W | |
| KJAU | | Campbell County Airport | Jacksboro | Tennessee | 36°20′03″N 084°09′47″W | |
| KJAX | JAX | Jacksonville International Airport | Jacksonville | Florida | 30°29′39″N 081°41′16″W | |
| KJBR | JBR | Jonesboro Municipal Airport | Jonesboro | Arkansas | 35°49′54″N 090°38′47″W | |
| KJCA | | Jackson County Airport (Georgia) | Jefferson | Georgia | 34°10′33″N 083°33′42″W | |
| KJCT | | Kimble County Airport | Junction | Texas | 30°30′39″N 099°45′52″W | |
| KJDD | | Wood County Airport | Quitman | Texas | 32°44′32″N 095°29′47″W | |
| KJDN | | Jordan Airport | Jordan | Montana | 47°19′44″N 106°57′10″W | |
| KJEF | | Jefferson City Memorial Airport | Jefferson City | Missouri | 38°35′28″N 092°09′22″W | |
| KJER | | Jerome County Airport | Jerome | Idaho | 42°43′36″N 114°27′24″W | |
| KJES | | Jesup–Wayne County Airport | Jesup | Georgia | 31°33′14″N 081°52′57″W | |
| KJFK | JFK | John F. Kennedy International Airport | New York | New York | 40°38′23″N 073°46′44″W | |
| KJFX | | Walker County Airport (Bevill Field) | Jasper | Alabama | 33°54′07″N 087°18′51″W | |
| KJFZ | | Tazewell County Airport | Richlands | Virginia | 37°03′49″N 081°47′54″W | |
| KJGG | | Williamsburg-Jamestown Airport | Williamsburg | Virginia | 37°14′21″N 076°42′58″W | |
| KJHN | | Stanton County Municipal Airport | Johnson | Kansas | 37°35′07″N 101°43′56″W | |
| KJHW | | Chautauqua County-Jamestown Airport | Jamestown | New York | 42°09′12″N 079°15′29″W | |
| KJKA | GUF | Jack Edwards Airport | Gulf Shores | Alabama | 30°17′23″N 087°40′18″W | |
| KJKJ | | Moorhead Municipal Airport | Moorhead | Minnesota | 46°50′21″N 096°39′51″W | |
| KJKL | | Julian Carroll Airport | Jackson | Kentucky | 37°35′38″N 083°19′02″W | |
| KJLN | JLN | Joplin Regional Airport | Joplin | Missouri | 37°09′06″N 094°29′54″W | |
| KJMC | JMC | Commodore Center Heliport | Sausalito | California | 37°52′43″N 122°30′47″W | |
| KJMR | | Mora Municipal Airport | Mora | Minnesota | 45°53′31″N 093°16′23″W | |
| KJMS | JMS | Jamestown Regional Airport | Jamestown | North Dakota | 46°55′47″N 098°40′42″W | |
| KJNX | | Johnston Regional Airport | Smithfield | North Carolina | 35°32′27″N 078°23′25″W | |
| KJOT | JOT | Joliet Regional Airport | Joliet | Illinois | 41°31′04″N 088°10′32″W | |
| KJPN | | Pentagon Army Heliport | Arlington | Virginia | 38°52′16″N 077°03′16″W | |
| KJPX | HTO | East Hampton Airport | East Hampton | New York | 40°57′34″N 072°15′06″W | Formerly KHTO |
| KJQD | | Ohio County Airport | Hartford | Kentucky | 37°27′31″N 086°50′59″W | |
| KJQF | USA | Concord Regional Airport | Concord | North Carolina | 35°23′16″N 080°42′33″W | |
| KJRA | | West 30th Street Heliport | Manhattan, New York City | New York | 40°45′17″N 074°00′25″W | |
| KJRB | JRB | Downtown Manhattan Heliport | Manhattan, New York City | New York | 40°42′04″N 074°00′32″W | |
| KJRO | | James A. Rhodes Airport | Jackson | Ohio | 38°58′53″N 082°34′40″W | |
| KJSD | JSD | Sikorsky Heliport | Stratford | Connecticut | 41°14′57″N 073°05′48″W | |
| KJSO | JKV | Cherokee County Airport | Jacksonville | Texas | 31°52′10″N 095°13′03″W | |
| KJST | JST | Johnstown-Cambria County Airport | Johnstown | Pennsylvania | 40°18′56″N 078°50′05″W | |
| KJSV | | Sallisaw Municipal Airport | Sallisaw | Oklahoma | 35°26′18″N 094°48′10″W | |
| KJSY | | Joseph State Airport | Joseph | Oregon | 45°21′34″N 117°15′14″W | |
| KJTC | | Springerville Municipal Airport | Springerville | Arizona | 34°07′46″N 109°18′39″W | |
| KJVL | JVL | Southern Wisconsin Regional Airport | Janesville | Wisconsin | 42°37′13″N 089°02′30″W | |
| KJVW | | John Bell Williams Airport | Raymond | Mississippi | 32°18′16″N 090°24′38″W | |
| KJVY | | Clark Regional Airport | Sellersburg | Indiana | 38°21′56″N 085°44′18″W | |
| KJWG | | Watonga Regional Airport | Watonga | Oklahoma | 35°51′52″N 098°25′15″W | |
| KJWN | | John C. Tune Airport | Nashville | Tennessee | 36°10′56″N 086°53′12″W | |
| KJWY | | Mid-Way Regional Airport | Midlothian | Texas | 32°27′30″N 096°54′45″W | |
| KJXI | | Gilmer Municipal Airport | Gilmer | Texas | 32°41′56″N 094°56′56″W | |
| KJXN | JXN | Jackson County Airport (Michigan) | Jackson | Michigan | 42°15′38″N 084°27′38″W | |
| KJYG | JYG | St. James Municipal Airport | St. James | Minnesota | 43°59′11″N 094°33′29″W | |
| KJYL | | Plantation Airpark | Sylvania | Georgia | 32°38′43″N 081°35′50″W | |
| KJYM | | Hillsdale Municipal Airport | Hillsdale | Michigan | 41°55′17″N 084°35′09″W | |
| KJYO | JYO | Leesburg Executive Airport (Godfrey Field) | Leesburg | Virginia | 39°04′41″N 077°33′27″W | |
| KJYR | | York Municipal Airport | York | Nebraska | 40°53′47″N 097°37′27″W | |
| KJZI | | Charleston Executive Airport | Charleston | South Carolina | 32°42′03″N 080°00′10″W | |
| KJZP | | Pickens County Airport | Jasper | Georgia | 34°27′12″N 084°27′26″W | |

== KK ==
| ICAO | IATA | Airport name | Community | State | Coordinates | Notes |
|---|---|---|---|---|---|---|
| KKCK | KCK | Fairfax Municipal Airport | Kansas City | Kansas | 39°08′53″N 094°35′59″W | Closed |
| KKIC | | Mesa Del Rey Airport | King City | California | 36°13′43″N 121°07′17″W | |
| KKLS | KLS | Southwest Washington Regional Airport (was Kelso-Longview) | Kelso | Washington | 46°07′05″N 122°53′54″W | |
| KKNB | KNB | Kanab Municipal Airport | Kanab | Utah | 37°00′40″N 112°31′52″W | |

== KL ==
| ICAO | IATA | Airport name | Community | State | Coordinates | Notes |
|---|---|---|---|---|---|---|
| KLAA | | Lamar Municipal Airport | Lamar | Colorado | 38°04′11″N 102°41′19″W | |
| KLAF | LAF | Purdue University Airport | West Lafayette | Indiana | 40°24′44″N 086°56′13″W | |
| KLAL | LAL | Lakeland Linder International Airport | Lakeland | Florida | 27°59′20″N 082°01′07″W | |
| KLAM | | Los Alamos Airport | Los Alamos | New Mexico | 35°52′47″N 106°16′07″W | |
| KLAN | LAN | Capital Region International Airport | Lansing | Michigan | 42°46′43″N 084°35′10″W | |
| KLAR | LAR | Laramie Regional Airport | Laramie | Wyoming | 41°18′43″N 105°40′30″W | |
| KLAS | LAS | Harry Reid International Airport | Las Vegas | Nevada | 36°04′48″N 115°09′08″W | |
| KLAW | | Lawton-Fort Sill Regional Airport | Lawton | Oklahoma | 34°34′04″N 098°24′59″W | |
| KLAX | LAX | Los Angeles International Airport | Los Angeles | California | 33°56′33″N 118°24′29″W | |
| KLBB | LBB | Lubbock Preston Smith International Airport | Lubbock | Texas | 33°39′49″N 101°49′14″W | |
| KLBE | LBE | Arnold Palmer Regional Airport | Latrobe | Pennsylvania | 40°16′29″N 079°24′24″W | |
| KLBF | LBF | North Platte Regional Airport (Lee Bird Field) | North Platte | Nebraska | 41°07′34″N 100°41′01″W | |
| KLBL | LBL | Liberal Municipal Airport | Liberal | Kansas | 37°02′39″N 100°57′36″W | |
| KLBO | | Floyd W. Jones Lebanon Airport | Lebanon | Missouri | 37°38′54″N 092°39′09″W | |
| KLBR | LBR | Clarksville/Red River County Airport (J.D. Trissell Field) | Clarksville | Texas | 33°35′34″N 095°03′51″W | |
| KLBT | | Lumberton Municipal Airport | Lumberton | North Carolina | 34°36′35″N 079°03′34″W | |
| KLBX | LJN | Texas Gulf Coast Regional Airport | Angleton | Texas | 29°06′31″N 095°27′44″W | |
| KLCG | | Wayne Municipal Airport (Stan Morris Field) | Wayne | Nebraska | 42°14′26″N 096°58′56″W | |
| KLCH | LCH | Lake Charles Regional Airport | Lake Charles | Louisiana | 30°07′34″N 093°13′24″W | |
| KLCI | | Laconia Municipal Airport | Laconia | New Hampshire | 43°34′22″N 071°25′08″W | |
| KLCK | LCK | Rickenbacker International Airport | Columbus | Ohio | 39°48′50″N 082°55′40″W | |
| KLCQ | | Lake City Gateway Airport | Lake City | Florida | 30°10′55″N 082°34′37″W | |
| KLDJ | | Linden Airport | Linden | New Jersey | 40°37′03″N 074°14′40″W | |
| KLDM | LDM | Mason County Airport | Ludington | Michigan | 43°57′45″N 086°24′28″W | |
| KLEB | LEB | Lebanon Municipal Airport | West Lebanon | New Hampshire | 32°43′36″N 117°10′52″W | |
| KLEE | LEE | Leesburg International Airport | Leesburg | Florida | 43°37′34″N 072°18′15″W | |
| KLEM | | Lemmon Municipal Airport | Lemmon | South Dakota | 28°49′23″N 081°48′31″W | |
| KLEW | | Auburn/Lewiston Municipal Airport | Auburn | Maine | 45°55′06″N 102°06′13″W | |
| KLEX | | Blue Grass Airport | Lexington | Kentucky | 44°02′55″N 070°17′01″W | |
| KLFI | | Langley Air Force Base | Hampton | Virginia | 38°02′11″N 084°36′21″W | |
| KLFK | | Angelina County Airport | Lufkin | Texas | 31°14′02″N 094°45′00″W | |
| KLFT | | Lafayette Regional Airport (Paul Fournet Field) | Lafayette | Louisiana | 30°12′19″N 091°59′15″W | |
| KLGA | LGA | La Guardia International Airport | New York | New York | 40°46′30″N 073°52′30″W | |
| KLGB | | Long Beach Airport | Long Beach | California | 33°49′04″N 118°09′06″W | |
| KLGC | LGC | LaGrange Callaway Airport | LaGrange | Georgia | 33°00′32″N 085°04′21″W | |
| KLGD | | La Grande/Union County Airport | La Grande | Oregon | 45°17′25″N 118°00′26″W | |
| KLGF | LGF | Laguna Army Airfield (Yuma Proving Ground) | Yuma | Arizona | 32°51′58″N 114°23′52″W | |
| KLGU | | Logan-Cache Airport | Logan | Utah | 41°47′24″N 111°51′00″W | |
| KLHB | | Hearne Municipal Airport | Hearne | Texas | 30°52′20″N 096°37′20″W | |
| KLHC | LHC | Arlington Municipal Airport | Arlington | Tennessee | 35°17′00″N 089°40′00″W | Closed |
| KLHM | | Lincoln Regional Airport (Karl Harder Field) | Lincoln | California | 38°54′33″N 121°21′05″W | |
| KLHQ | | Fairfield County Airport | Lancaster | Ohio | 39°45′20″N 082°39′26″W | |
| KLHV | | William T. Piper Memorial Airport | Lock Haven | Pennsylvania | 41°08′09″N 077°25′20″W | |
| KLHW | LIY | MidCoast Regional Airport at Wright Army Airfield | Fort Stewart | Georgia | 31°53′21″N 081°33′44″W | |
| KLHX | | La Junta Municipal Airport | La Junta | Colorado | 38°03′00″N 103°30′35″W | |
| KLHZ | | Triangle North Executive Airport (Franklin County Airport) | Louisburg | North Carolina | 36°01′24″N 078°19′49″W | |
| KLIC | | Limon Municipal Airport | Limon | Colorado | 39°16′09″N 103°39′57″W | |
| KLIT | | Bill and Hillary Clinton National Airport (Adams Field) | Little Rock | Arkansas | 34°43′48″N 092°13′12″W | |
| KLIU | | Littlefield Taylor Brown Municipal Airport | Littlefield | Texas | 33°55′26″N 102°23′13″W | |
| KLJF | | Litchfield Municipal Airport | Litchfield | Minnesota | 45°05′50″N 094°30′26″W | |
| KLKP | | Lake Placid Airport | Lake Placid | New York | 44°15′52″N 073°57′43″W | |
| KLKR | | Lancaster County Airport (McWhirter Field) | Lancaster | South Carolina | 34°43′22″N 080°51′17″W | |
| KLKU | | Louisa County Airport (Freeman Field) | Louisa | Virginia | 38°00′35″N 077°58′12″W | |
| KLKV | | Lake County Airport | Lakeview | Oregon | 42°09′40″N 120°23′57″W | |
| KLLJ | | Challis Airport | Challis | Idaho | 44°31′25″N 114°13′04″W | |
| KLLN | | Levelland Municipal Airport | Levelland | Texas | 33°33′09″N 102°22′19″W | |
| KLLQ | | Monticello Municipal Airport (Ellis Field) | Monticello | Arkansas | 33°38′19″N 091°45′04″W | |
| KLLR | | Little River Airport | Little River | California | 39°15′43″N 123°45′13″W | |
| KLLU | | Lamar Municipal Airport | Lamar | Missouri | 37°29′10″N 094°18′43″W | |
| KLMO | | Vance Brand Airport | Longmont | Colorado | 40°09′51″N 105°09′49″W | Formerly KAMR |
| KLMS | | Louisville Winston County Airport | Louisville | Mississippi | 33°08′46″N 089°03′45″W | |
| KLMT | | Crater Lake-Klamath Regional Airport | Klamath Falls | Oregon | 42°09′22″N 121°43′59″W | |
| KLNA | | Palm Beach County Park Airport (Lantana Airport) | West Palm Beach | Florida | 26°35′35″N 080°05′06″W | |
| KLNC | | Lancaster Regional Airport | Lancaster | Texas | 32°34′39″N 096°43′03″W | |
| KLND | | Hunt Field | Lander | Wyoming | 42°48′56″N 108°43′42″W | |
| KLNK | | Lincoln Airport | Lincoln | Nebraska | 40°51′04″N 096°45′33″W | |
| KLNL | | Kings Land o' Lakes Airport | Land o' Lakes | Wisconsin | 46°09′15″N 089°12′43″W | |
| KLNN | | Lost Nation Airport | Willoughby | Ohio | 41°41′02″N 081°23′23″W | |
| KLNP | | Lonesome Pine Airport | Wise | Virginia | 36°59′15″N 082°31′48″W | |
| KLNR | LNR | Tri-County Regional Airport | Lone Rock | Wisconsin | 43°12′43″N 090°10′47″W | |
| KLNS | | Lancaster Airport | Lancaster | Pennsylvania | 40°07′20″N 076°17′40″W | |
| KLOL | | Derby Field | Lovelock | Nevada | 40°03′59″N 118°33′54″W | |
| KLOM | BBX | Wings Field | Blue Bell | Pennsylvania | 40°08′15″N 075°15′54″W | |
| KLOR | LOR | Lowe Army Heliport | Fort Novosel / Ozark | Alabama | 31°21′21″N 085°45′04″W | |
| KLOT | LOT | Lewis University Airport | Romeoville | Illinois | 41°36′21″N 088°05′38″W | |
| KLOU | | Bowman Field | Louisville | Kentucky | 38°13′41″N 085°39′49″W | |
| KLOZ | | London-Corbin Airport (Magee Field) | London | Kentucky | 37°05′13″N 084°04′39″W | |
| KLPC | | Lompoc Airport | Lompoc | California | 34°39′56″N 120°28′03″W | |
| KLPR | | Lorain County Regional Airport | Lorain | Ohio | 41°20′39″N 082°10′40″W | |
| KLQK | | Pickens County Airport | Pickens | South Carolina | 34°48′36″N 082°42′10″W | |
| KLQR | | Larned-Pawnee County Airport | Larned | Kansas | 38°12′25″N 099°05′09″W | |
| KLRD | LRD | Laredo International Airport | Laredo | Texas | 27°32′38″N 099°27′42″W | |
| KLRF | | Little Rock Air Force Base | Jacksonville | Arkansas | 34°55′01″N 092°08′47″W | |
| KLRG | | Lincoln Regional Airport | Lincoln | Maine | 45°21′44″N 068°32′05″W | |
| KLRJ | LRJ | Le Mars Municipal Airport | Le Mars | Iowa | 42°46′41″N 096°11′37″W | |
| KLRO | | Mount Pleasant Regional Airport | Mount Pleasant | South Carolina | 32°53′52″N 079°46′58″W | |
| KLRU | | Las Cruces International Airport | Las Cruces | New Mexico | 32°17′22″N 106°55′19″W | |
| KLRY | | Lawrence Smith Memorial Airport | Harrisonville | Missouri | 38°36′37″N 094°20′37″W | |
| KLSB | | Lordsburg Municipal Airport | Lordsburg | New Mexico | 32°20′03″N 108°41′35″W | |
| KLSE | LSE | La Crosse Regional Airport | La Crosse | Wisconsin | 43°52′45″N 091°15′24″W | |
| KLSF | | Lawson Army Airfield | Fort Benning, Chattahoochee County | Georgia | 32°20′14″N 084°59′29″W | |
| KLSK | | Lusk Municipal Airport | Lusk | Wyoming | 42°45′14″N 104°24′17″W | |
| KLSN | | Los Banos Municipal Airport | Los Banos | California | 37°03′46″N 120°52′09″W | |
| KLSV | LSV | Nellis Air Force Base | Las Vegas | Nevada | 36°14′57″N 114°59′46″W | |
| KLTS | LTS | Altus Air Force Base | Altus | Oklahoma | 34°39′59″N 099°16′05″W | |
| KLTY | | Liberty County Airport | Chester | Montana | 48°30′39″N 110°59′27″W | |
| KLUA | | Luray Caverns Airport | Luray | Virginia | 38°40′01″N 078°30′02″W | |
| KLUD | | Decatur Municipal Airport | Decatur | Texas | 33°15′15″N 097°34′50″W | |
| KLUF | LUF | Luke Air Force Base | Glendale | Arizona | 33°32′06″N 112°22′59″W | |
| KLUG | | Ellington Airport | Lewisburg | Tennessee | 35°30′25″N 086°48′14″W | |
| KLUK | LUK | Cincinnati Municipal Lunken Airport | Cincinnati | Ohio | 39°06′12″N 084°25′07″W | |
| KLUL | | Hesler-Noble Field | Laurel | Mississippi | 31°40′23″N 089°10′22″W | |
| KLUM | | Menomonie Municipal Airport | Menomonie | Wisconsin | 44°53′32″N 091°32′04″W | |
| KLUV | | Lamesa Municipal Airport | Lamesa | Texas | 32°45′19″N 101°54′55″W | |
| KLUX | | Laurens County Airport | Laurens | South Carolina | 34°30′25″N 081°56′50″W | |
| KLVJ | | Pearland Regional Airport | Houston | Texas | 29°31′17″N 095°14′32″W | |
| KLVK | | Livermore Municipal Airport | Livermore | California | 37°41′36″N 121°49′13″W | |
| KLVL | | Lawrenceville/Brunswick Municipal Airport | Lawrenceville | Virginia | 36°46′28″N 077°47′38″W | |
| KLVM | | Mission Field | Livingston | Montana | 45°41′58″N 110°26′53″W | |
| KLVN | | Airlake Airport | Lakeville | Minnesota | 44°37′40″N 093°13′41″W | |
| KLVS | LVS | Las Vegas Municipal Airport | Las Vegas | New Mexico | 35°39′15″N 105°08′33″W | |
| KLWA | | South Haven Area Regional Airport | South Haven | Michigan | 42°21′10″N 086°15′13″W | |
| KLWB | | Greenbrier Valley Airport | Lewisburg | West Virginia | 37°51′30″N 080°23′58″W | |
| KLWC | | Lawrence Municipal Airport | Lawrence | Kansas | 39°00′40″N 095°12′59″W | |
| KLWD | | Lamoni Municipal Airport | Lamoni | Iowa | 40°38′00″N 093°54′08″W | |
| KLWL | | Wells Municipal Airport (Harriet Field) | Wells | Nevada | 41°07′02″N 114°55′20″W | |
| KLWM | | Lawrence Municipal Airport | Lawrence | Massachusetts | 42°43′02″N 071°07′24″W | |
| KLWS | | Lewiston-Nez Perce County Airport | Lewiston | Idaho | 46°22′28″N 117°00′55″W | |
| KLWT | | Lewistown Municipal Airport | Lewistown | Montana | 47°02′57″N 109°28′00″W | |
| KLWV | | Lawrenceville-Vincennes International Airport | Lawrenceville | Illinois | 38°45′51″N 087°36′20″W | |
| KLXL | | Little Falls/Morrison County Airport (Lindbergh Field) | Little Falls | Minnesota | 45°56′59″N 094°20′51″W | |
| KLXN | | Jim Kelly Field | Lexington | Nebraska | 40°47′26″N 099°46′33″W | |
| KLXT | | Lee's Summit Municipal Airport | Lee's Summit | Missouri | 38°57′35″N 094°22′17″W | |
| KLXV | | Lake County Airport (Leadville Airport) | Leadville | Colorado | 39°13′13″N 106°19′00″W | |
| KLXY | | Mexia-Limestone County Airport | Mexia | Texas | 31°38′23″N 096°30′53″W | |
| KLYH | | Lynchburg Regional Airport | Lynchburg | Virginia | 37°19′31″N 079°12′04″W | |
| KLYO | | Lyons-Rice County Municipal Airport | Lyons | Kansas | 38°20′22″N 098°13′43″W | |
| KLYV | | Luverne Municipal Airport | Luverne | Minnesota | 43°37′00″N 096°13′04″W | |
| KLZD | | Danielson Airport | Danielson | Connecticut | 41°49′11″N 071°54′04″W | |
| KLZU | | Gwinnett County Airport (Briscoe Field) | Lawrenceville | Georgia | 33°58′41″N 083°57′45″W | |
| KLZZ | | Lampasas Airport | Lampasas | Texas | 31°06′22″N 098°11′45″W | |

== KM ==
| ICAO | IATA | Airport name | Community | State | Coordinates | Notes |
|---|---|---|---|---|---|---|
| KMAC | MAC | Macon Downtown Airport (Herbert Smart Downtown Airport) | Macon | Georgia | 32°49′20″N 083°33′43″W | |
| KMAE | | Madera Municipal Airport | Madera | California | 36°59′19″N 120°06′45″W | |
| KMAF | MAF | Midland International Air and Space Port | Midland | Texas | 31°56′33″N 102°12′07″W | |
| KMAI | | Marianna Municipal Airport | Marianna | Florida | 30°50′16″N 085°10′55″W | |
| KMAL | | Malone-Dufort Airport | Malone | New York | 44°51′13″N 074°19′44″W | |
| KMAN | | Nampa Municipal Airport | Nampa | Idaho | 43°34′53″N 116°31′23″W | |
| KMAO | | Marion County Airport | Marion | South Carolina | 34°10′52″N 079°20′05″W | |
| KMAW | | Malden Municipal Airport | Malden | Missouri | 36°35′54″N 089°59′33″W | |
| KMBG | | Mobridge Municipal Airport | Mobridge | South Dakota | 45°32′47″N 100°24′23″W | |
| KMBL | MBL | Manistee County Blacker Airport | Manistee | Michigan | 44°16′21″N 086°14′49″W | |
| KMBO | | Bruce Campbell Field | Madison | Mississippi | 32°26′19″N 090°06′11″W | |
| KMBS | MBS | MBS International Airport | Midland / Bay City / Saginaw | Michigan | 43°31′58″N 084°04′47″W | |
| KMBT | MBT | Murfreesboro Municipal Airport | Murfreesboro | Tennessee | 35°52′39″N 086°22′39″W | |
| KMBY | MBY | Omar N. Bradley Airport | Moberly | Missouri | 39°27′52″N 092°25′42″W | |
| KMCB | MCB | McComb-Pike County Airport (John E. Lewis Field) | McComb | Mississippi | 31°10′42″N 090°28′19″W | |
| KMCC | MCC | McClellan Airfield | Sacramento | California | 38°40′04″N 121°24′02″W | |
| KMCD | MCD | Mackinac Island Airport | Mackinac Island | Michigan | 45°51′54″N 084°38′14″W | |
| KMCE | | Merced Regional Airport (MacReady Field) | Merced | California | 37°17′05″N 120°30′50″W | |
| KMCF | MCF | MacDill Air Force Base | Tampa | Florida | 27°50′58″N 082°31′16″W | |
| KMCI | MCI | Kansas City International Airport | Kansas City | Missouri | 39°17′51″N 094°42′50″W | |
| KMCK | MCK | McCook Ben Nelson Regional Airport | McCook | Nebraska | 40°12′23″N 100°35′32″W | |
| KMCN | MCN | Middle Georgia Regional Airport | Macon | Georgia | 32°41′34″N 083°38′57″W | |
| KMCO | MCO | Orlando International Airport | Orlando | Florida | 28°25′46″N 081°18′32″W | |
| KMCW | | Mason City Municipal Airport | Mason City | Iowa | 43°09′28″N 093°19′52″W | |
| KMCX | | White County Airport | Monticello | Indiana | 40°42′32″N 086°46′00″W | |
| KMCZ | | Martin County Airport | Williamston | North Carolina | 35°51′44″N 077°10′42″W | |
| KMDA | MDA | Martindale Army Heliport | San Antonio | Texas | 29°25′53″N 098°22′40″W | |
| KMDD | | Midland Airpark | Midland | Texas | 32°02′12″N 102°06′04″W | |
| KMDF | | Mooreland Municipal Airport | Mooreland | Oklahoma | 36°29′05″N 099°11′39″W | |
| KMDH | MDH | Southern Illinois Airport | Carbondale | Illinois | 37°46′41″N 089°15′07″W | |
| KMDQ | | Madison County Executive Airport (Tom Sharp Jr. Field) | Huntsville | Alabama | 34°51′41″N 086°33′27″W | |
| KMDS | | Madison Municipal Airport | Madison | South Dakota | 44°00′59″N 097°05′08″W | |
| KMDT | MDT | Harrisburg International Airport | Middletown | Pennsylvania | 40°11′35″N 076°45′48″W | |
| KMDW | MDW | Chicago Midway International Airport | Chicago | Illinois | 41°47′10″N 087°45′09″W | |
| KMDZ | | Taylor County Airport | Medford | Wisconsin | 45°06′05″N 090°18′01″W | |
| KMEB | | Laurinburg-Maxton Airport | Maxton | North Carolina | 34°47′31″N 079°21′57″W | |
| KMEI | MEI | Meridian Regional Airport (Key Field) | Meridian | Mississippi | 32°19′57″N 088°45′07″W | |
| KMEJ | | Meade Municipal Airport | Meade | Kansas | 37°16′37″N 100°21′22″W | |
| KMEM | MEM | Memphis International Airport | Memphis | Tennessee | 35°02′33″N 089°58′36″W | |
| KMER | MER | Castle Airport | Atwater | California | 37°22′50″N 120°34′05″W | |
| KMEV | | Minden–Tahoe Airport | Minden | Nevada | 39°00′03″N 119°45′07″W | |
| KMEY | | James G. Whiting Memorial Field | Mapleton | Iowa | 42°10′42″N 095°47′37″W | |
| KMEZ | UMZ | Mena Intermountain Municipal Airport | Mena | Arkansas | 34°32′43″N 094°12′10″W | |
| KMFD | MFD | Mansfield Lahm Regional Airport | Mansfield | Ohio | 40°49′17″N 082°31′00″W | |
| KMFE | MFE | McAllen-Miller International Airport | McAllen | Texas | 26°10′33″N 098°14′19″W | |
| KMFI | | Marshfield Municipal Airport (Wisconsin) | Marshfield | Wisconsin | 44°38′13″N 090°11′22″W | |
| KMFR | MFR | Rogue Valley International-Medford Airport | Medford | Oregon | 42°22′27″N 122°52′25″W | |
| KMFV | | Accomack County Airport | Melfa | Virginia | 37°38′48″N 075°45′39″W | |
| KMGC | MGC | Michigan City Municipal Airport | Michigan City | Indiana | 41°42′12″N 086°49′16″W | |
| KMGE | MGE | Dobbins Air Reserve Base (General Lucius D. Clay National Guard Center) | Marietta | Georgia | 33°54′55″N 084°30′59″W | |
| KMGG | | Maple Lake Municipal Airport | Maple Lake | Minnesota | 45°14′10″N 093°59′08″W | |
| KMGJ | | Orange County Airport | Montgomery | New York | 41°30′36″N 074°15′53″W | |
| KMGM | MGM | Montgomery Regional Airport (Dannelly Field) | Montgomery | Alabama | 32°18′02″N 086°23′38″W | |
| KMGN | | Harbor Springs Municipal Airport | Harbor Springs | Michigan | 45°25′32″N 084°54′48″W | |
| KMGR | MGR | Moultrie Municipal Airport | Moultrie | Georgia | 31°05′06″N 083°48′12″W | |
| KMGW | MGW | Morgantown Municipal Airport | Morgantown | West Virginia | 39°38′34″N 079°54′59″W | |
| KMGY | MGY | Dayton Wright Brothers Airport | Dayton | Ohio | 39°35′20″N 084°13′30″W | |
| KMHE | MHE | Mitchell Municipal Airport | Mitchell | South Dakota | 43°46′29″N 098°02′19″W | |
| KMHK | MHK | Manhattan Regional Airport | Manhattan | Kansas | 39°08′28″N 096°40′18″W | |
| KMHL | | Marshall Memorial Municipal Airport | Marshall | Missouri | 39°05′44″N 093°12′10″W | |
| KMHN | | Hooker County Airport | Mullen | Nebraska | 42°02′32″N 101°03′32″W | |
| KMHP | | Metter Municipal Airport | Metter | Georgia | 32°22′26″N 082°04′54″W | |
| KMHR | MHR | Sacramento Mather Airport | Sacramento | California | 38°33′14″N 121°17′51″W | |
| KMHS | | Dunsmuir Municipal-Mott Airport | Mount Shasta | California | 41°15′47″N 122°16′20″W | |
| KMHT | MHT | Manchester-Boston Regional Airport | Manchester | New Hampshire | 42°55′57″N 071°26′08″W | |
| KMHV | | Mojave Air and Space Port (Civilian Aerospace Test Center) | Mojave | California | 35°03′34″N 118°09′06″W | |
| KMIA | MIA | Miami International Airport | Miami | Florida | 25°47′36″N 080°17′26″W | |
| KMIB | MIB | Minot Air Force Base | Minot | North Dakota | 48°24′57″N 101°21′29″W | |
| KMIC | | Crystal Airport | Crystal | Minnesota | 45°03′43″N 093°21′14″W | |
| KMIE | MIE | Delaware County Regional Airport | Muncie | Indiana | 40°14′33″N 085°23′45″W | |
| KMIO | | Miami Municipal Airport | Miami | Oklahoma | 36°54′33″N 094°53′15″W | |
| KMIT | | Shafter Airport (Minter Field) | Shafter | California | 35°30′21″N 119°11′30″W | |
| KMIV | MIV | Millville Executive Airport | Millville | New Jersey | 39°22′04″N 075°04′20″W | |
| KMIW | MIW | Marshalltown Municipal Airport | Marshalltown | Iowa | 42°06′46″N 092°55′04″W | |
| KMJD | | Picayune Municipal Airport | Picayune | Mississippi | 30°29′15″N 089°39′04″W | |
| KMJQ | MJQ | Jackson Municipal Airport | Jackson | Minnesota | 43°39′00″N 094°59′12″W | |
| KMJX | | Robert J. Miller Air Park (Ocean County Airport) | Toms River | New Jersey | 39°55′39″N 074°17′33″W | |
| KMKA | | Miller Municipal Airport | Miller | South Dakota | 44°31′31″N 098°57′29″W | |
| KMKC | MKC | Charles B. Wheeler Downtown Airport | Kansas City | Missouri | 39°07′23″N 094°35′34″W | |
| KMKE | MKE | Milwaukee Mitchell International Airport | Milwaukee | Wisconsin | 42°56′34″N 087°54′52″W | |
| KMKG | MKG | Muskegon County Airport | Muskegon | Michigan | 43°10′04″N 086°14′08″W | |
| KMKJ | | Mountain Empire Airport | Marion / Wytheville | Virginia | 36°53′42″N 081°20′59″W | |
| KMKL | MKL | Jackson Regional Airport | Jackson | Tennessee | 35°35′59″N 088°54′56″W | |
| KMKN | | Comanche County–City Airport | Comanche | Texas | 31°55′13″N 098°35′57″W | |
| KMKO | | Davis Field | Muskogee | Oklahoma | 35°39′28″N 095°21′42″W | |
| KMKS | | Berkeley County Airport | Moncks Corner | South Carolina | 33°11′08″N 080°02′10″W | |
| KMKT | MKT | Mankato Regional Airport | Mankato | Minnesota | 44°13′18″N 093°55′07″W | |
| KMKV | | Marksville Municipal Airport | Marksville | Louisiana | 31°05′41″N 092°04′09″W | |
| KMKY | | Marco Island Airport | Naples | Florida | 25°59′42″N 081°40′21″W | |
| KMLB | MLB | Melbourne Orlando International Airport | Melbourne | Florida | 28°06′10″N 080°38′43″W | |
| KMLC | | McAlester Regional Airport | McAlester | Oklahoma | 34°52′57″N 095°47′00″W | |
| KMLD | | Malad City Airport | Malad City | Idaho | 42°10′14″N 112°17′22″W | |
| KMLE | | Millard Airport | Omaha | Nebraska | 41°11′46″N 096°06′44″W | |
| KMLF | MLF | Milford Municipal Airport (Ben and Judy Briscoe Field) | Milford | Utah | 38°25′36″N 113°00′48″W | |
| KMLI | MLI | Quad Cities International Airport | Moline | Illinois | 41°26′55″N 090°30′27″W | |
| KMLJ | MLJ | Baldwin County Regional Airport | Milledgeville | Georgia | 33°09′15″N 083°14′27″W | |
| KMLS | MLS | Miles City Municipal Airport | Miles City | Montana | 46°25′41″N 105°53′10″W | |
| KMLT | | Millinocket Municipal Airport | Millinocket | Maine | 45°38′52″N 068°41′08″W | |
| KMLU | MLU | Monroe Regional Airport | Monroe | Louisiana | 32°30′39″N 092°02′16″W | |
| KMMH | MMH | Mammoth Yosemite Airport | Mammoth Lakes | California | 37°37′27″N 118°50′20″W | |
| KMMI | | McMinn County Airport | Athens | Tennessee | 35°23′50″N 084°33′45″W | |
| KMMK | | Meriden Markham Municipal Airport | Meriden | Connecticut | 41°30′31″N 072°49′46″W | |
| KMML | MML | Southwest Minnesota Regional Airport (Marshall/Ryan Field) | Marshall | Minnesota | 44°27′02″N 095°49′19″W | |
| KMMS | | Selfs Airport | Marks | Mississippi | 34°13′53″N 090°17′23″W | |
| KMMT | | McEntire Joint National Guard Base | Eastover | South Carolina | 33°55′15″N 080°48′04″W | |
| KMMU | MMU | Morristown Municipal Airport | Morristown | New Jersey | 40°47′58″N 074°24′54″W | |
| KMMV | MMV | McMinnville Municipal Airport | McMinnville | Oregon | 45°11′40″N 123°08′10″W | |
| KMNE | | Minden Airport | Minden | Louisiana | 32°38′46″N 093°17′53″W | |
| KMNF | | Mountain View Airport | Mountain View | Missouri | 36°59′34″N 091°42′52″W | |
| KMNG | | Montana Air National Guard Heliport | Billings | Montana | 45°48′12″N 108°34′00″W | |
| KMNI | | Santee Cooper Regional Airport | Manning | South Carolina | 33°35′14″N 080°12′31″W | |
| KMNM | MNM | Menominee–Marinette Twin County Airport | Menominee | Michigan | 45°07′36″N 087°38′18″W | |
| KMNN | MNN | Marion Municipal Airport | Marion | Ohio | 40°36′58″N 083°03′48″W | |
| KMNV | | Monroe County Airport | Madisonville | Tennessee | 35°32′43″N 084°22′49″W | |
| KMNZ | | Hamilton Municipal Airport | Hamilton | Texas | 31°39′57″N 098°08′55″W | |
| KMOB | MOB | Mobile Regional Airport | Mobile | Alabama | 30°41′29″N 088°14′34″W | |
| KMOD | MOD | Modesto City-County Airport | Modesto | California | 37°37′33″N 120°57′16″W | |
| KMOP | MOP | Mount Pleasant Municipal Airport | Mount Pleasant | Michigan | 43°37′18″N 084°44′15″W | |
| KMOR | | Morristown Regional Airport | Morristown | Tennessee | 36°10′42″N 083°22′38″W | |
| KMOT | MOT | Minot International Airport | Minot | North Dakota | 48°15′28″N 101°16′41″W | |
| KMOX | MOX | Morris Municipal Airport | Morris | Minnesota | 45°33′57″N 095°58′01″W | |
| KMPE | | Philadelphia Municipal Airport | Philadelphia | Mississippi | 32°47′57″N 089°07′34″W | |
| KMPG | | Marshall County Airport | Moundsville | West Virginia | 39°52′51″N 080°44′09″W | |
| KMPI | MPI | Mariposa-Yosemite Airport | Mariposa | California | 37°30′39″N 120°02′22″W | |
| KMPJ | | Petit Jean Park Airport | Morrilton | Arkansas | 35°08′20″N 092°54′33″W | |
| KMPO | | Pocono Mountains Municipal Airport | Mount Pocono | Pennsylvania | 41°08′16″N 075°22′48″W | |
| KMPR | | McPherson Airport | McPherson | Kansas | 38°21′34″N 097°41′12″W | |
| KMPV | | Edward F. Knapp State Airport | Barre-Montpelier | Vermont | 44°12′13″N 072°33′44″W | |
| KMPZ | MPZ | Mount Pleasant Municipal Airport | Mount Pleasant | Iowa | 40°56′48″N 091°30′40″W | |
| KMQB | MQB | Macomb Municipal Airport | Macomb | Illinois | 40°31′11″N 090°39′22″W | |
| KMQI | | Dare County Regional Airport | Manteo | North Carolina | 35°55′08″N 075°41′44″W | |
| KMQJ | MQJ | Indianapolis Regional Airport (Mount Comfort Airport) | Indianapolis | Indiana | 39°50′37″N 085°53′49″W | |
| KMQS | CTH | Chester County G. O. Carlson Airport | Coatesville | Pennsylvania | 39°58′44″N 075°51′56″W | |
| KMQT | MQT | Marquette County Airport | Marquette | Michigan | 46°32′02″N 087°33′45″W | Closed |
| KMQW | MQW | Telfair–Wheeler Airport | McRae-Helena | Georgia | 32°05′49″N 082°52′46″W | |
| KMQY | MQY | Smyrna Airport | Smyrna | Tennessee | 36°00′32″N 086°31′12″W | |
| KMRB | MRB | Eastern West Virginia Regional Airport (Shepherd Field) | Martinsburg | West Virginia | 39°24′07″N 077°59′05″W | |
| KMRC | MRC | Maury County Regional Airport | Columbia | Tennessee | 35°33′15″N 087°10′44″W | |
| KMRF | | Marfa Municipal Airport | Marfa | Texas | 30°22′16″N 104°01′03″W | |
| KMRH | | Michael J. Smith Field | Beaufort | North Carolina | 34°44′01″N 076°39′38″W | |
| KMRJ | | Iowa County Airport | Mineral Point | Wisconsin | 42°53′13″N 090°14′12″W | |
| KMRN | MRN | Foothills Regional Airport | Morganton | North Carolina | 35°49′13″N 081°36′41″W | |
| KMRT | | Union County Airport | Marysville | Ohio | 40°13′29″N 083°21′06″W | |
| KMRY | MRY | Monterey Regional Airport | Monterey | California | 36°35′13″N 121°50′35″W | |
| KMSL | MSL | Northwest Alabama Regional Airport | Muscle Shoals | Alabama | 34°44′43″N 087°36′37″W | |
| KMSN | MSN | Dane County Regional Airport | Madison | Wisconsin | 43°08′24″N 089°20′15″W | |
| KMSO | MSO | Missoula International Airport | Missoula | Montana | 46°54′59″N 114°05′26″W | |
| KMSP | MSP | Minneapolis-Saint Paul International Airport | Bloomington | Minnesota | 44°52′55″N 093°13′18″W | |
| KMSS | MSS | Massena International Airport | Massena | New York | 44°56′09″N 074°50′44″W | |
| KMSV | | Sullivan County International Airport | Monticello | New York | 41°42′06″N 074°47′42″W | |
| KMSY | MSY | Louis Armstrong New Orleans International Airport | New Orleans | Louisiana | 29°59′36″N 090°15′29″W | |
| KMTC | MTC | Selfridge Air National Guard Base | Mt. Clemens | Michigan | 42°36′30″N 082°50′08″W | |
| KMTH | MTH | Florida Keys Marathon Airport | Marathon | Florida | 24°43′34″N 081°03′05″W | |
| KMTJ | | Montrose Regional Airport | Montrose | Colorado | 38°30′35″N 107°53′39″W | |
| KMTN | MTN | Martin State Airport | Baltimore | Maryland | 39°19′32″N 076°24′50″W | |
| KMTO | MTO | Coles County Memorial Airport | Mattoon | Illinois | 39°28′41″N 088°16′45″W | |
| KMTP | MTP | Montauk Airport | Montauk | New York | 41°04′36″N 071°55′14″W | |
| KMTV | | Blue Ridge Airport | Martinsville | Virginia | 36°37′51″N 080°01′06″W | |
| KMTW | | Manitowoc County Airport | Manitowoc | Wisconsin | 44°07′44″N 087°40′50″W | |
| KMUI | MUI | Muir Army Heliport | Fort Indiantown Gap | Pennsylvania | 40°26′05″N 076°34′09″W | |
| KMUL | MUL | Spence Airport | Moultrie | Georgia | 31°08′16″N 083°42′15″W | |
| KMUO | MUO | Mountain Home Air Force Base | Mountain Home | Idaho | 43°02′24″N 115°52′12″W | |
| KMUT | | Muscatine Municipal Airport | Muscatine | Iowa | 41°22′04″N 091°08′54″W | |
| KMUU | | Huntingdon County Airport | Mount Union | Pennsylvania | 40°19′05″N 077°52′34″W | Closed |
| KMUV | MUV | Henry C. Mustin Naval Air Facility | Philadelphia | Pennsylvania | 39°53′33″N 075°09′22″W | Closed |
| KMVC | MVC | Monroe County Airport | Monroeville | Alabama | 31°27′29″N 087°21′04″W | |
| KMVE | MVE | Montevideo–Chippewa County Airport | Montevideo | Minnesota | 44°58′17″N 095°42′43″W | |
| KMVI | | Monte Vista Municipal Airport | Monte Vista | Colorado | 37°31′42″N 106°02′47″W | |
| KMVL | | Morrisville-Stowe State Airport | Morrisville | Vermont | 44°32′05″N 072°36′50″W | |
| KMVM | | Machias Valley Airport | Machias | Maine | 44°42′11″N 067°28′43″W | |
| KMVN | MVN | Mount Vernon Airport | Mount Vernon | Illinois | 38°19′24″N 088°51′31″W | |
| KMVY | MVY | Martha's Vineyard Airport | Vineyard Haven | Massachusetts | 41°23′35″N 070°36′52″W | |
| KMWA | MWA | Veterans Airport of Southern Illinois | Marion | Illinois | 37°45′18″N 089°00′40″W | |
| KMWC | | Lawrence J. Timmerman Airport | Milwaukee | Wisconsin | 43°06′37″N 088°02′04″W | |
| KMWH | | Grant County International Airport | Moses Lake | Washington | 47°12′31″N 119°19′09″W | |
| KMWK | | Mount Airy/Surry County Airport | Mount Airy | North Carolina | 36°27′35″N 080°33′11″W | |
| KMWL | | Mineral Wells Airport | Mineral Wells | Texas | 32°46′54″N 098°03′37″W | |
| KMWM | MWM | Windom Municipal Airport | Windom | Minnesota | 43°54′48″N 095°06′34″W | |
| KMWO | MWO | Middletown Regional Airport | Middletown | Ohio | 39°31′54″N 084°23′47″W | |
| KMXA | | Manila Municipal Airport | Manila | Arkansas | 35°53′40″N 090°09′16″W | |
| KMXF | MXF | Maxwell Air Force Base | Montgomery | Alabama | 32°22′45″N 086°21′45″W | |
| KMXO | | Monticello Regional Airport | Monticello | Iowa | 42°13′13″N 091°09′48″W | |
| KMYF | | Montgomery-Gibbs Executive Airport | San Diego | California | 32°48′57″N 117°08′22″W | |
| KMYJ | | Mexico Memorial Airport | Mexico | Missouri | 39°09′27″N 091°49′06″W | |
| KMYL | | McCall Municipal Airport | McCall | Idaho | 44°53′19″N 116°06′06″W | |
| KMYR | MYR | Myrtle Beach International Airport | Myrtle Beach | South Carolina | 33°40′47″N 078°55′42″W | |
| KMYV | MYV | Yuba County Airport | Marysville | California | 39°05′52″N 121°34′11″W | |
| KMYZ | | Marysville Municipal Airport | Marysville | Kansas | 39°51′23″N 096°37′50″W | |
| KMZH | | Moose Lake Carlton County Airport | Moose Lake | Minnesota | 46°25′08″N 092°48′17″W | |
| KMZJ | MZJ | Pinal Airpark | Marana | Arizona | 32°30′35″N 111°19′31″W | |
| KMZZ | MZZ | Marion Municipal Airport | Marion | Indiana | 40°29′24″N 085°40′47″W | |

== KN ==
| ICAO | IATA | Airport name | Community | State | Coordinates | Notes |
|---|---|---|---|---|---|---|
| KNAB | | Naval Air Station Albany | Albany | Georgia | 31°35′38″N 084°06′00″W | Closed |
| KNBC | BFT | Marine Corps Air Station Beaufort | Beaufort | South Carolina | 32°28′38″N 080°43′23″W | |
| KNBG | NBG | Naval Air Station Joint Reserve Base New Orleans | Belle Chasse | Louisiana | 29°49′28″N 090°02′01″W | |
| KNBJ | NHX | Naval Outlying Landing Field Barin | Foley | Alabama | 30°23′21″N 087°38′07″W | |
| KNBV | | Naval Surface Warfare Center Panama City Heliport | Panama City | Florida | 30°10′31″N 085°45′09″W | |
| KNCA | NCA | Marine Corps Air Station New River | Jacksonville | North Carolina | 34°42′26″N 077°26′43″W | |
| KNCL | | US Fleet Forces Command Heliport | Norfolk | Virginia | 36°55′55″N 076°18′07″W | |
| KNCY | | Naval Weapons Station Yorktown Helipad | Newport News | Virginia | 37°16′06″N 076°34′27″W | |
| KNDY | | Naval Surface Warfare Center Dahlgren | Dahlgren | Virginia | 38°19′30″N 077°02′00″W | |
| KNDZ | | Naval Air Station Whiting Field South | Milton | Florida | 30°42′16″N 087°01′23″W | |
| KNEL | NEL | Naval Air Engineering Station Lakehurst | Lakehurst | New Jersey | 40°02′00″N 074°21′13″W | |
| KNEN | | Naval Outlying Landing Field Whitehouse | Jacksonville | Florida | 30°21′14″N 081°52′19″W | |
| KNEW | NEW | Lakefront Airport | New Orleans | Louisiana | 30°02′33″N 090°01′42″W | |
| KNFD | | Naval Outlying Landing Field Summerdale | Summerdale | Alabama | 30°30′28″N 087°38′44″W | |
| KNFE | | Naval Auxiliary Landing Field Fentress | Chesapeake | Virginia | 36°41′31″N 076°08′04″W | |
| KNFG | NFG | Marine Corps Air Station Camp Pendleton | Camp Pendleton | California | 33°18′04″N 117°21′19″W | |
| KNFJ | | Naval Outlying Landing Field Choctaw | Milton | Florida | 30°30′33″N 086°57′28″W | |
| KNFL | NFL | Naval Air Station Fallon | Fallon | Nevada | 39°25′30″N 118°42′10″W | |
| KNFW | | Naval Air Station Joint Reserve Base Fort Worth | Fort Worth | Texas | 32°46′09″N 097°26′30″W | |
| KNGP | NGP | Naval Air Station Corpus Christi | Corpus Christi | Texas | 27°41′33″N 097°17′28″W | |
| KNGS | | Naval Outlying Landing Field Santa Rosa | Milton | Florida | 30°36′39″N 086°56′24″W | |
| KNGT | | Naval Outlying Field Goliad | Berclair | Texas | 28°36′42″N 097°36′45″W | |
| KNGU | NGU | Naval Station Norfolk | Norfolk | Virginia | 36°56′42″N 076°18′47″W | |
| KNGZ | | Naval Air Station Alameda | Alameda | California | 27°42′16″N 097°26′26″W | |
| KNHK | NHK | Naval Air Station Patuxent River | Patuxent River | Maryland | 37°47′10″N 122°19′07″W | Closed |
| KNHL | | Naval Outlying Landing Field Wolf | Foley | Alabama | 38°17′10″N 076°24′42″W | |
| KNHZ | | Naval Air Station Brunswick | Brunswick | Maine | 30°20′46″N 087°32′30″W | Closed and converted to civilian use - see KBXM |
| KNID | | Naval Air Weapons Station China Lake | Ridgecrest | California | 35°41′08″N 117°41′31″W | |
| KNIP | NIP | Naval Air Station Jacksonville | Jacksonville | Florida | 30°14′09″N 081°40′50″W | |
| KNJK | NJK | Naval Air Facility El Centro | El Centro | California | 32°49′45″N 115°40′18″W | |
| KNJM | | Marine Corps Auxiliary Landing Field Bogue | Swansboro | North Carolina | 34°41′26″N 077°01′47″W | |
| KNJP | NJP | Naval Air Warfare Center Warminster | Warminster | Pennsylvania | 40°12′00″N 075°03′36″W | Closed |
| KNJW | | Naval Outlying Landing Field Joe Williams | Meridian | Mississippi | 32°47′56″N 088°50′04″W | |
| KNKL | | Naval Outlying Landing Field Holley | Fort Walton Beach | Florida | 30°25′51″N 086°53′59″W | |
| KNKT | NKT | Marine Corps Air Station Cherry Point | Cherry Point | North Carolina | 34°54′03″N 076°52′51″W | |
| KNKX | NKX | Marine Corps Air Station Miramar | San Diego | California | 32°52′04″N 117°08′30″W | |
| KNLC | | Naval Air Station Lemoore | Lemoore | California | 36°19′59″N 119°57′07″W | |
| KNLW | | Naval Station Newport Heliport | Newport | Rhode Island | 41°30′12″N 071°19′33″W | |
| KNMM | NMM | Naval Air Station Meridian | Meridian | Mississippi | 32°33′07″N 088°33′20″W | |
| KNOG | | Naval Auxiliary Landing Field Orange Grove | Orange Grove | Texas | 27°54′04″N 098°03′06″W | |
| KNOW | | Coast Guard Air Station Port Angeles | Port Angeles | Washington | 48°08′27″N 123°24′39″W | |
| KNPA | NPA | Naval Air Station Pensacola | Pensacola | Florida | 30°21′09″N 087°19′04″W | |
| KNPI | | Naval Outlying Landing Field Site 8 | Pensacola | Florida | 30°32′35″N 087°22′05″W | |
| KNQA | NQA | Millington Regional Jetport | Millington | Tennessee | 35°21′24″N 089°52′13″W | |
| KNQB | | Naval Outlying Landing Field Silverhill | Robertsdale | Alabama | 30°33′46″N 087°48′36″W | Closed |
| KNQI | NQI | Naval Air Station Kingsville | Kingsville | Texas | 27°30′16″N 097°48′29″W | |
| KNQX | NQX | Naval Air Station Key West | Boca Chica Key | Florida | 24°34′33″N 081°41′20″W | |
| KNRA | | Naval Outlying Landing Field Coupeville | Coupeville | Washington | 48°11′00″N 122°38′00″W | |
| KNRB | | Naval Station Mayport | Jacksonville | Florida | 30°23′31″N 081°25′25″W | |
| KNRC | NRC | NASA Crows Landing Airport | Crows Landing | California | 37°24′29″N 121°06′34″W | Closed |
| KNRN | | Norton Municipal Airport | Norton | Kansas | 39°50′49″N 099°53′31″W | |
| KNRQ | | Naval Outlying Landing Field Spencer | Pace | Florida | 30°37′30″N 087°08′23″W | |
| KNRS | | Naval Outlying Landing Field Imperial Beach | Imperial Beach | California | 32°33′48″N 117°06′42″W | |
| KNSE | | Naval Air Station Whiting Field North | Milton | Florida | 30°43′07″N 087°01′26″W | |
| KNSF | NSF | Naval Air Facility Washington | Camp Springs | Maryland | 38°48′39″N 076°52′01″W | |
| KNSI | | Naval Outlying Landing Field San Nicolas Island | San Nicolas Island | California | 33°14′23″N 119°27′29″W | |
| KNSX | | Naval Outlying Landing Field Site X Heliport | Jay | Florida | 30°48′54″N 087°10′05″W | |
| KNTD | NTD | Naval Air Station Point Mugu | Oxnard | California | 34°07′13″N 119°07′16″W | |
| KNTK | | Marine Corps Air Station Tustin | Santa Ana | California | 33°42′22″N 117°49′38″W | Closed |
| KNTU | NTU | Naval Air Station Oceana | Virginia Beach | Virginia | 36°49′14″N 076°02′00″W | |
| KNUC | | Naval Auxiliary Landing Field San Clemente Island | San Clemente | California | 33°01′22″N 118°35′19″W | |
| KNUI | | Naval Outlying Landing Field Webster | Saint Inigoes | Maryland | 38°08′39″N 076°25′37″W | |
| KNUN | | Naval Outlying Landing Field Saufley | Pensacola | Florida | 30°28′11″N 087°20′17″W | Closed |
| KNUQ | NUQ | Moffett Federal Airfield | Mountain View | California | 37°24′54″N 122°02′54″W | |
| KNUW | | Naval Air Station Whidbey Island | Oak Harbor | Washington | 48°21′07″N 122°39′21″W | |
| KNVD | NVD | Nevada Municipal Airport | Nevada | Missouri | 37°51′08″N 094°18′18″W | |
| KNVI | | Naval Outlying Landing Field Pace | Wallace | Florida | 30°42′09″N 087°11′31″W | |
| KNWL | | Naval Outlying Landing Field Waldron | Corpus Christi | Texas | 27°37′53″N 097°18′42″W | |
| KNXF | | Marine Corps Outlying Field (Red Beach) Camp Pendleton | Camp Pendleton | California | 33°17′09″N 117°27′28″W | |
| KNXP | | Marine Corps Air Ground Combat Center Twentynine Palms | Twentynine Palms | California | 34°13′54″N 116°03′42″W | |
| KNXX | | Naval Air Station Joint Reserve Base Willow Grove | Willow Grove | Pennsylvania | 40°11′59″N 075°08′54″W | Closed |
| KNYG | | Marine Corps Air Facility Quantico | Quantico | Virginia | 38°30′13″N 077°18′18″W | |
| KNYL | YUM | Yuma International Airport / Marine Corps Air Station Yuma | Yuma | Arizona | 32°39′24″N 114°36′22″W | |
| KNZJ | | Marine Corps Air Station El Toro | Santa Ana | California | 33°40′34″N 117°43′52″W | Closed |
| KNZX | | Naval Outlying Landing Field Harold Heliport | Harold | Florida | 30°40′51″N 086°53′14″W | |
| KNZY | NZY | Naval Air Station North Island | San Diego | California | 32°41′57″N 117°12′55″W | |

== KO ==
| ICAO | IATA | Airport name | Community | State | Coordinates | Notes |
|---|---|---|---|---|---|---|
| KOAJ | | Albert J. Ellis Airport | Jacksonville | North Carolina | 34°49′45″N 077°36′44″W | |
| KOAK | OAK | Oakland International Airport | Oakland | California | 37°43′17″N 122°13′15″W | |
| KOAR | | Marina Municipal Airport | Marina | California | 36°40′53″N 121°45′42″W | |
| KOBE | | Okeechobee County Airport | Okeechobee | Florida | 27°15′58″N 080°51′04″W | |
| KOBI | | Woodbine Municipal Airport | Woodbine | New Jersey | 39°13′09″N 074°47′41″W | |
| KOCF | | Ocala International Airport (Jim Taylor Field) | Ocala | Florida | 29°10′18″N 082°13′27″W | |
| KOCH | OCH | Nacogdoches A.L. Mangham Jr. Regional Airport | Nacogdoches | Texas | 31°34′41″N 094°42′34″W | |
| KOCQ | | Oconto – J. Douglas Bake Municipal Airport | Oconto | Wisconsin | 44°52′27″N 087°54′42″W | |
| KOCW | | Washington–Warren Airport | Washington | North Carolina | 35°34′14″N 077°02′59″W | |
| KODO | | Odessa-Schlemeyer Field | Odessa | Texas | 31°55′17″N 102°23′13″W | |
| KODX | | Evelyn Sharp Field | Ord | Nebraska | 41°37′27″N 098°57′09″W | |
| KOEA | OEA | O'Neal Airport | Vincennes | Indiana | 38°41′29″N 087°33′08″W | Closed |
| KOEB | | Branch County Memorial Airport | Coldwater | Michigan | 41°56′01″N 085°03′08″W | |
| KOEL | | Oakley Municipal Airport | Oakley | Kansas | 39°06′36″N 100°48′58″W | |
| KOEO | OEO | L.O. Simenstad Municipal Airport | Osceola | Wisconsin | 45°18′34″N 092°41′24″W | |
| KOFF | | Offutt Air Force Base | Omaha | Nebraska | 41°07′10″N 095°54′31″W | |
| KOFK | | Norfolk Regional Airport (Karl Stefan Memorial Field) | Norfolk | Nebraska | 41°59′08″N 097°26′06″W | |
| KOFP | | Hanover County Municipal Airport | Richmond / Ashland | Virginia | 37°42′32″N 077°26′11″W | |
| KOGA | | Searle Field | Ogallala | Nebraska | 41°07′10″N 101°45′36″W | |
| KOGB | | Orangeburg Municipal Airport | Orangeburg | South Carolina | 33°27′25″N 080°51′34″W | |
| KOGD | | Ogden-Hinckley Airport | Ogden | Utah | 41°11′44″N 112°00′47″W | |
| KOGM | | Ontonagon County Airport | Ontonagon | Michigan | 46°50′43″N 089°22′01″W | |
| KOGS | | Ogdensburg International Airport | Ogdensburg | New York | 44°40′55″N 075°27′56″W | |
| KOIC | | Lt. Warren Eaton Airport | Norwich | New York | 42°33′59″N 075°31′27″W | |
| KOIN | | Oberlin Municipal Airport | Oberlin | Kansas | 39°50′02″N 100°32′20″W | |
| KOJA | | Thomas P. Stafford Airport | Weatherford | Oklahoma | 35°32′45″N 098°40′07″W | |
| KOJC | | Johnson County Executive Airport | Olathe | Kansas | 38°50′51″N 094°44′15″W | |
| KOKB | | Oceanside Municipal Airport (Bob Maxwell Field) | Oceanside | California | 33°13′05″N 117°21′05″W | |
| KOKC | OKC | Will Rogers World Airport | Oklahoma City | Oklahoma | 35°23′35″N 097°36′03″W | |
| KOKH | ODW | DeLaurentis Airport | Oak Harbor | Washington | 48°15′06″N 122°40′25″W | |
| KOKK | | Kokomo Municipal Airport | Kokomo | Indiana | 40°31′41″N 086°03′32″W | |
| KOKM | | Okmulgee Regional Airport | Okmulgee | Oklahoma | 35°40′05″N 095°56′55″W | |
| KOKS | | Garden County Airport | Oshkosh | Nebraska | 41°24′04″N 102°21′18″W | |
| KOKV | | Winchester Regional Airport | Winchester | Virginia | 39°08′38″N 078°08′40″W | |
| KOKZ | | Kaolin Field | Sandersville | Georgia | 32°58′00″N 082°50′18″W | |
| KOLD | OLD | Old Town Municipal Airport and Seaplane Base (Dewitt Field) | Old Town | Maine | 44°57′09″N 068°40′28″W | |
| KOLE | | Cattaraugus County-Olean Airport | Olean | New York | 42°14′28″N 078°22′17″W | |
| KOLF | | L. M. Clayton Airport | Wolf Point | Montana | 48°05′40″N 105°34′30″W | |
| KOLG | | Solon Springs Municipal Airport | Solon Springs | Wisconsin | 46°18′53″N 091°48′59″W | |
| KOLM | | Olympia Regional Airport | Olympia | Washington | 46°58′10″N 122°54′09″W | |
| KOLS | OLS | Nogales International Airport | Nogales | Arizona | 31°25′04″N 110°50′52″W | |
| KOLU | | Columbus Municipal Airport | Columbus | Nebraska | 41°26′53″N 097°20′34″W | |
| KOLV | | Olive Branch Airport | Olive Branch | Mississippi | 34°58′44″N 089°47′13″W | |
| KOLY | OLY | Olney-Noble Airport | Olney | Illinois | 38°43′19″N 088°10′26″W | |
| KOLZ | | Oelwein Municipal Airport | Oelwein | Iowa | 42°40′51″N 091°58′25″W | |
| KOMA | OMA | Eppley Field | Omaha | Nebraska | 41°18′00″N 095°53′42″W | |
| KOMH | | Orange County Airport | Orange | Virginia | 38°14′50″N 078°02′44″W | |
| KOMK | | Omak Airport | Omak | Washington | 48°27′51″N 119°31′05″W | |
| KOMN | | Ormond Beach Municipal Airport | Ormond Beach | Florida | 29°18′04″N 081°06′50″W | |
| KONA | | Winona Municipal Airport (Max Conrad Field) | Winona | Minnesota | 44°04′38″N 091°42′30″W | |
| KONL | | O'Neill Municipal Airport (John L. Baker Field) | O'Neill | Nebraska | 42°28′10″N 098°41′14″W | |
| KONM | ONM | Socorro Municipal Airport | Socorro | New Mexico | 34°01′21″N 106°54′11″W | |
| KONO | | Ontario Municipal Airport | Ontario | Oregon | 44°01′10″N 117°00′47″W | |
| KONP | | Newport Municipal Airport | Newport | Oregon | 44°34′49″N 124°03′28″W | |
| KONT | ONT | Ontario International Airport | Ontario | California | 34°03′22″N 117°36′04″W | |
| KONX | | Currituck County Regional Airport | Currituck | North Carolina | 36°23′59″N 076°00′56″W | |
| KONY | | Olney Municipal Airport | Olney | Texas | 33°21′03″N 098°49′09″W | |
| KONZ | | Grosse Ile Municipal Airport | Grosse Ile | Michigan | 42°05′57″N 083°09′41″W | |
| KOOA | OOA | Oskaloosa Municipal Airport | Oskaloosa | Iowa | 41°13′34″N 092°29′38″W | |
| KOPF | | Miami-Opa Locka Executive Airport | Opa-locka | Florida | 25°54′27″N 080°16′42″W | |
| KOPL | | St. Landry Parish Airport (Ahart Field) | Opelousas | Louisiana | 30°33′30″N 092°05′58″W | |
| KOPN | | Thomaston-Upson County Airport | Thomaston | Georgia | 32°57′17″N 084°15′48″W | |
| KOQN | | Brandywine Airport | West Chester | Pennsylvania | 39°59′24″N 075°34′55″W | |
| KOQU | NCO | Quonset State Airport | North Kingstown | Rhode Island | 41°35′50″N 071°24′44″W | |
| KOQW | | Maquoketa Municipal Airport | Maquoketa | Iowa | 42°03′03″N 090°44′21″W | |
| KORB | | Orr Regional Airport | Orr | Minnesota | 48°00′57″N 092°51′22″W | |
| KORC | | Orange City Municipal Airport | Orange City | Iowa | 42°59′20″N 096°03′45″W | Closed |
| KORD | ORD | O'Hare International Airport | Chicago | Illinois | 41°58′43″N 087°54′17″W | |
| KORE | | Orange Municipal Airport | Orange | Massachusetts | 42°34′12″N 072°17′19″W | |
| KORF | ORF | Norfolk International Airport | Norfolk | Virginia | 36°53′41″N 076°12′04″W | |
| KORG | | Orange County Airport | Orange | Texas | 30°04′09″N 093°48′13″W | |
| KORH | | Worcester Regional Airport | Worcester | Massachusetts | 42°16′02″N 071°52′33″W | |
| KORK | | North Little Rock Municipal Airport | North Little Rock | Arkansas | 34°49′59″N 092°15′15″W | |
| KORL | | Orlando Executive Airport | Orlando | Florida | 28°32′44″N 081°19′59″W | |
| KORS | ESD | Orcas Island Airport | Eastsound | Washington | 48°42′29″N 122°54′38″W | |
| KOSA | MPS | Mount Pleasant Regional Airport | Mount Pleasant | Texas | 33°05′49″N 094°57′42″W | |
| KOSC | OSC | Oscoda-Wurtsmith Airport | Oscoda | Michigan | 44°27′06″N 083°23′39″W | |
| KOSH | | Wittman Regional Airport | Oshkosh | Wisconsin | 43°59′04″N 088°33′25″W | |
| KOSU | OSU | Ohio State University Airport (OSU Don Scott Airport) | Columbus | Ohio | 40°04′47″N 083°04′23″W | |
| KOSX | | Kosciusko-Attala County Airport | Kosciusko | Mississippi | 33°05′25″N 089°32′31″W | |
| KOTG | OTG | Worthington Municipal Airport | Worthington | Minnesota | 43°39′18″N 095°34′45″W | |
| KOTH | | Southwest Oregon Regional Airport | North Bend | Oregon | 43°25′02″N 124°15′46″W | |
| KOTM | | Ottumwa Regional Airport | Ottumwa | Iowa | 41°06′24″N 092°26′53″W | |
| KOUN | | University of Oklahoma Westheimer Airport | Norman | Oklahoma | 35°14′44″N 097°28′20″W | |
| KOVE | | Oroville Municipal Airport | Oroville | California | 39°29′16″N 121°37′19″W | |
| KOVL | | Olivia Regional Airport | Olivia | Minnesota | 44°46′43″N 095°01′58″W | |
| KOVO | | North Vernon Airport | North Vernon | Indiana | 39°02′42″N 085°36′14″W | |
| KOVS | | Boscobel Airport | Boscobel | Wisconsin | 43°09′39″N 090°40′26″W | |
| KOWA | OWA | Owatonna Degner Regional Airport | Owatonna | Minnesota | 44°07′24″N 093°15′36″W | |
| KOWB | | Owensboro-Daviess County Regional Airport | Owensboro | Kentucky | 37°44′20″N 087°10′01″W | |
| KOWD | | Norwood Memorial Airport | Norwood | Massachusetts | 42°11′26″N 071°10′23″W | |
| KOWI | | Ottawa Municipal Airport | Ottawa | Kansas | 38°32′20″N 095°15′10″W | |
| KOWK | | Central Maine Airport of Norridgewock | Norridgewock | Maine | 44°42′56″N 069°51′59″W | |
| KOWP | | William R. Pogue Municipal Airport | Sand Springs | Oklahoma | 36°10′31″N 096°09′07″W | |
| KOWX | | Putnam County Airport | Ottawa | Ohio | 41°02′08″N 083°58′55″W | |
| KOXB | OCE | Ocean City Municipal Airport | Ocean City | Maryland | 38°18′38″N 075°07′26″W | |
| KOXC | | Waterbury-Oxford Airport | Oxford | Connecticut | 41°28′43″N 073°08′07″W | |
| KOXD | | Miami University Airport | Oxford | Ohio | 39°30′08″N 084°47′04″W | |
| KOXI | | Starke County Airport | Knox | Indiana | 41°19′47″N 086°39′44″W | |
| KOXR | | Oxnard Airport | Oxnard | California | 34°12′03″N 119°12′26″W | |
| KOXV | OXV | Knoxville Municipal Airport | Knoxville | Iowa | 41°17′57″N 093°06′49″W | |
| KOYM | | St. Marys Municipal Airport | Saint Marys | Pennsylvania | 41°24′45″N 078°30′09″W | |
| KOZA | | Ozona Municipal Airport | Ozona | Texas | 30°44′07″N 101°12′11″W | |
| KOZR | OZR | Cairns Army Airfield | Fort Novosel / Ozark | Alabama | 31°16′33″N 085°42′48″W | |
| KOZS | OZS | Camdenton Memorial Airport | Camdenton | Missouri | 37°58′26″N 092°41′28″W | |
| KOZW | | Livingston County Spencer J. Hardy Airport | Howell | Michigan | 42°37′46″N 083°58′56″W | |

== KP ==
| ICAO | IATA | Airport name | Community | State | Coordinates | Notes |
|---|---|---|---|---|---|---|
| KPAE | PAE | Snohomish County Airport (Paine Field) | Everett | Washington | 47°54′22″N 122°16′53″W | |
| KPAH | PAH | Barkley Regional Airport | Paducah | Kentucky | 37°03′37″N 088°46′23″W | |
| KPAI | | Barton Heliport | Pacoima | California | 34°15′31″N 118°24′25″W | |
| KPAM | | Tyndall AFB | Panama City | Florida | 30°04′43″N 085°34′35″W | |
| KPAN | PJB | Payson Airport | Payson | Arizona | 34°15′25″N 111°20′21″W | |
| KPAO | | Palo Alto Airport | Palo Alto | California | 37°27′40″N 122°06′54″W | |
| KPBF | | Grider Field | Pine Bluff | Arkansas | 34°10′37″N 091°56′14″W | |
| KPBG | PBG | Plattsburgh International Airport | Plattsburgh | New York | 44°39′03″N 073°28′05″W | |
| KPBH | | Price County Airport | Phillips | Wisconsin | 45°42′32″N 090°24′09″W | |
| KPBX | | Pike County Airport (Hatcher Field) | Pikeville | Kentucky | 37°33′42″N 082°33′59″W | |
| KPCA | | Picacho Stagefield ARNG Heliport | Tucson | Arizona | 32°39′48″N 111°29′14″W | |
| KPCD | | Perryville Regional Airport | Perryville | Missouri | 37°52′07″N 089°51′44″W | |
| KPCM | | Plant City Airport | Plant City | Florida | 28°00′01″N 082°09′51″W | |
| KPCU | | Picayune-Pearl River County Airport | Picayune | Mississippi | 30°31′20″N 089°42′24″W | Closed |
| KPCW | | Erie–Ottawa International Airport | Port Clinton | Ohio | 41°30′59″N 082°52′10″W | |
| KPCZ | | Waupaca Municipal Airport (Brunner Field) | Waupaca | Wisconsin | 44°20′00″N 089°01′11″W | |
| KPDC | | Prairie du Chien Municipal Airport | Prairie du Chien | Wisconsin | 43°01′09″N 091°07′25″W | |
| KPDK | PDK | DeKalb-Peachtree Airport | Atlanta | Georgia | 33°52′32″N 084°18′07″W | |
| KPDT | PDT | Eastern Oregon Regional Airport | Pendleton | Oregon | 45°41′42″N 118°50′29″W | |
| KPDX | PDX | Portland International Airport | Portland | Oregon | 45°35′19″N 122°35′51″W | |
| KPEA | | Pella Municipal Airport | Pella | Iowa | 41°24′00″N 092°56′45″W | |
| KPEO | | Penn Yan Airport (Yates County Airport) | Penn Yan | New York | 42°38′14″N 077°03′10″W | |
| KPEQ | PEQ | Pecos Municipal Airport | Pecos | Texas | 31°22′57″N 103°30′39″W | |
| KPEX | | Paynesville Municipal Airport | Paynesville | Minnesota | 45°22′19″N 094°44′41″W | |
| KPEZ | | Pleasanton Municipal Airport | Pleasanton | Texas | 28°57′15″N 098°31′12″W | |
| KPFC | | Pacific City State Airport | Pacific City | Oregon | 45°11′59″N 123°57′44″W | |
| KPFN | | Panama City-Bay County International Airport | Panama City | Florida | 30°12′44″N 085°40′58″W | Closed 2010 |
| KPGA | PGA | Page Municipal Airport | Page | Arizona | 36°55′34″N 111°26′54″W | |
| KPGD | PGD | Punta Gorda Airport | Punta Gorda | Florida | 26°55′08″N 081°59′27″W | |
| KPGR | | Kirk Field | Paragould | Arkansas | 36°03′50″N 090°30′33″W | |
| KPGV | PGV | Pitt-Greenville Airport | Greenville | North Carolina | 35°38′07″N 077°23′07″W | |
| KPHD | | Harry Clever Field Airport | New Philadelphia | Ohio | 40°28′13″N 081°25′12″W | |
| KPHF | PHF | Newport News/Williamsburg International Airport | Newport News | Virginia | 37°07′55″N 076°29′35″W | |
| KPHG | | Phillipsburg Municipal Airport | Phillipsburg | Kansas | 39°44′09″N 099°19′02″W | |
| KPHH | | Robert F. Swinnie Airport | Andrews | South Carolina | 33°27′06″N 079°31′34″W | |
| KPHK | | Palm Beach County Glades Airport | Pahokee | Florida | 26°47′06″N 080°41′36″W | |
| KPHL | PHL | Philadelphia International Airport | Philadelphia | Pennsylvania | 39°52′19″N 075°14′28″W | |
| KPHN | PHN | St. Clair County International Airport | Port Huron | Michigan | 42°54′39″N 082°31′44″W | |
| KPHP | | Philip Airport | Philip | South Dakota | 44°02′55″N 101°36′03″W | |
| KPHT | | Henry County Airport | Paris | Tennessee | 36°20′18″N 088°22′58″W | |
| KPHX | PHX | Phoenix Sky Harbor International Airport | Phoenix | Arizona | 33°26′03″N 112°00′42″W | |
| KPIA | PIA | General Wayne A. Downing Peoria International Airport | Peoria | Illinois | 40°39′51″N 089°41′36″W | |
| KPIB | PIB | Hattiesburg-Laurel Regional Airport | Hattiesburg | Mississippi | 31°28′02″N 089°20′13″W | |
| KPIE | PIE | St. Pete-Clearwater International Airport | St. Petersburg | Florida | 27°54′36″N 082°41′15″W | |
| KPIH | PIH | Pocatello Regional Airport | Pocatello | Idaho | 42°54′35″N 112°35′45″W | |
| KPIL | | Port Isabel-Cameron County Airport | Port Isabel | Texas | 26°09′58″N 097°20′45″W | |
| KPIM | PIM | Harris County Airport | Pine Mountain | Georgia | 32°50′26″N 084°52′57″W | |
| KPIR | PIR | Pierre Regional Airport | Pierre | South Dakota | 44°22′58″N 100°17′10″W | |
| KPIT | PIT | Pittsburgh International Airport | Pittsburgh | Pennsylvania | 40°29′46″N 080°14′46″W | |
| KPJC | | Zelienople Municipal Airport | Zelienople | Pennsylvania | 40°48′07″N 080°09′39″W | |
| KPJY | | Pinckneyville-DuQuoin Airport | Pinckneyville | Illinois | 37°58′38″N 089°21′38″W | |
| KPKB | PKB | Mid-Ohio Valley Regional Airport | Parkersburg | West Virginia | 39°20′42″N 081°26′22″W | |
| KPKD | PKD | Park Rapids Municipal Airport | Park Rapids | Minnesota | 46°54′02″N 095°04′23″W | |
| KPKF | PKF | Park Falls Municipal Airport | Park Falls | Wisconsin | 45°57′18″N 090°25′28″W | |
| KPKV | PKV | Calhoun County Airport | Port Lavaca | Texas | 28°39′15″N 096°40′53″W | |
| KPLB | PLB | Clinton County Airport | Plattsburgh | New York | 44°41′15″N 073°31′28″W | Closed 2007 |
| KPLD | | Portland Municipal Airport | Portland | Indiana | 40°27′06″N 084°59′20″W | |
| KPLK | | M. Graham Clark Downtown Airport | Point Lookout | Missouri | 36°37′33″N 093°13′44″W | |
| KPLN | PLN | Pellston Regional Airport | Pellston | Michigan | 45°34′15″N 084°47′48″W | |
| KPLR | PLR | St. Clair County Airport | Pell City | Alabama | 33°33′32″N 086°14′57″W | |
| KPLU | PLU | Pierce County Airport (Thun Field) | Graham | Washington | 47°06′14″N 122°17′14″W | |
| KPMB | | Pembina Municipal Airport | Pembina | North Dakota | 48°56′33″N 097°14′27″W | |
| KPMD | | Palmdale Regional Airport | Palmdale | California | 34°37′43″N 118°05′04″W | |
| KPMH | PMH | Greater Portsmouth Regional Airport | Portsmouth | Ohio | 38°50′26″N 082°50′50″W | |
| KPMP | PPM | Pompano Beach Airpark | Pompano Beach | Florida | 26°14′50″N 080°06′40″W | |
| KPMU | | Panola County Airport | Batesville | Mississippi | 34°21′49″N 089°53′33″W | |
| KPMV | PMV | Plattsmouth Municipal Airport | Plattsmouth | Nebraska | 40°56′52″N 095°55′02″W | |
| KPMZ | PMZ | Plymouth Municipal Airport | Plymouth | North Carolina | 35°48′39″N 076°45′30″W | |
| KPNA | PWY | Ralph Wenz Field | Pinedale | Wyoming | 42°47′44″N 109°48′26″W | |
| KPNC | PNC | Ponca City Regional Airport | Ponca City | Oklahoma | 36°43′55″N 097°05′59″W | |
| KPNE | PNE | Northeast Philadelphia Airport | Philadelphia | Pennsylvania | 40°04′55″N 075°00′38″W | |
| KPNM | PNM | Princeton Municipal Airport | Princeton | Minnesota | 45°33′36″N 093°36′30″W | |
| KPNN | PNN | Princeton Municipal Airport | Princeton | Maine | 45°12′02″N 067°33′52″W | |
| KPNS | PNS | Pensacola International Airport | Pensacola | Florida | 30°28′24″N 087°11′12″W | |
| KPNT | | Pontiac Municipal Airport | Pontiac | Illinois | 40°55′28″N 088°37′26″W | |
| KPOB | | Pope Field (military) | Fayetteville | North Carolina | 35°10′15″N 079°00′52″W | |
| KPOC | | Brackett Field | La Verne | California | 34°05′30″N 117°46′54″W | |
| KPOE | POE | Polk Army Airfield | Fort Polk | Louisiana | 31°02′41″N 093°11′30″W | |
| KPOF | POF | Poplar Bluff Regional Business Airport | Poplar Bluff | Missouri | 36°46′26″N 090°19′30″W | |
| KPOH | POH | Pocahontas Municipal Airport | Pocahontas | Iowa | 42°44′34″N 094°38′50″W | |
| KPOU | | Hudson Valley Regional Airport (Poughkeepsie Airport) | Poughkeepsie | New York | 41°37′36″N 073°53′03″W | |
| KPOV | | Portage County Regional Airport | Ravenna | Ohio | 41°12′37″N 081°15′06″W | |
| KPOY | | Powell Municipal Airport | Powell | Wyoming | 44°52′02″N 108°47′35″W | |
| KPPA | PPA | Perry LeFors Field | Pampa | Texas | 35°36′47″N 100°59′46″W | |
| KPPF | | Tri-City Airport | Parsons | Kansas | 37°19′51″N 095°30′22″W | |
| KPPO | LPO | La Porte Municipal Airport | La Porte | Indiana | 41°34′21″N 086°44′04″W | |
| KPPQ | | Pittsfield Penstone Municipal Airport | Pittsfield | Illinois | 39°38′21″N 090°46′44″W | |
| KPQI | PQI | Presque Isle International Airport | Presque Isle | Maine | 46°41′20″N 068°02′41″W | |
| KPQL | PGL | Trent Lott International Airport | Pascagoula | Mississippi | 30°27′46″N 088°31′45″W | |
| KPQN | | Pipestone Municipal Airport | Pipestone | Minnesota | 43°59′00″N 096°18′01″W | |
| KPRB | | Paso Robles Municipal Airport | Paso Robles | California | 35°40′22″N 120°37′37″W | |
| KPRC | PRC | Ernest A. Love Field | Prescott | Arizona | 34°39′16″N 112°25′11″W | |
| KPRG | | Edgar County Airport | Paris | Illinois | 39°42′01″N 087°40′11″W | |
| KPRN | | Mac Crenshaw Memorial Airport | Greenville | Alabama | 31°50′44″N 086°36′38″W | |
| KPRO | PRO | Perry Municipal Airport | Perry | Iowa | 41°49′41″N 094°09′35″W | |
| KPRS | | Presidio Lely International Airport | Presidio | Texas | 29°38′03″N 104°21′41″W | |
| KPRX | | Cox Field | Paris | Texas | 33°38′12″N 095°27′03″W | |
| KPRZ | | Portales Municipal Airport | Portales | New Mexico | 34°08′44″N 103°24′37″W | |
| KPSB | | Mid-State Regional Airport | Philipsburg, Centre County | Pennsylvania | 40°53′00″N 078°05′14″W | |
| KPSC | PSC | Tri-Cities Airport | Pasco | Washington | 46°15′53″N 119°07′09″W | |
| KPSF | | Pittsfield Municipal Airport | Pittsfield | Massachusetts | 42°25′37″N 073°17′34″W | |
| KPSK | | New River Valley Airport | Dublin | Virginia | 37°08′14″N 080°40′43″W | |
| KPSM | | Portsmouth International Airport at Pease | Portsmouth | New Hampshire | 43°04′41″N 070°49′24″W | |
| KPSN | PSN | Palestine Municipal Airport | Palestine | Texas | 31°46′47″N 095°42′23″W | |
| KPSO | | Stevens Field | Pagosa Springs | Colorado | 37°17′17″N 107°03′18″W | |
| KPSP | PSP | Palm Springs International Airport | Palm Springs | California | 33°49′47″N 116°30′24″W | |
| KPSX | PSX | Palacios Municipal Airport | Palacios | Texas | 28°43′39″N 096°15′03″W | |
| KPTB | | Dinwiddie County Airport | Petersburg | Virginia | 37°11′02″N 077°30′27″W | |
| KPTD | | Potsdam Municipal Airport (Damon Field) | Potsdam | New York | 44°40′36″N 074°56′54″W | |
| KPTG | | Lee County Airport | Pennington Gap | Virginia | 36°44′46″N 083°02′14″W | Closed |
| KPTK | PTK | Oakland County International Airport | Waterford Township | Michigan | 42°39′56″N 083°25′13″W | |
| KPTN | | Harry P. Williams Memorial Airport | Patterson | Louisiana | 29°42′34″N 091°20′20″W | |
| KPTS | | Atkinson Municipal Airport | Pittsburg | Kansas | 37°26′58″N 094°43′52″W | |
| KPTT | PTT | Pratt Regional Airport | Pratt | Kansas | 37°42′09″N 098°44′49″W | |
| KPTV | PTV | Porterville Municipal Airport | Porterville | California | 36°01′47″N 119°03′46″W | |
| KPTW | | Heritage Field | Pottstown | Pennsylvania | 40°14′22″N 075°33′24″W | |
| KPUB | PUB | Pueblo Memorial Airport | Pueblo | Colorado | 38°17′15″N 104°29′43″W | |
| KPUC | | Carbon County Regional Airport (Buck Davis Field) | Price | Utah | 39°36′50″N 110°45′05″W | |
| KPUJ | | Silver Comet Field at Paulding Northwest Atlanta Airport | Dallas | Georgia | 33°54′43″N 084°56′26″W | |
| KPUL | | Port of Poulsbo Marina Moorage Seaplane Base | Poulsbo | Washington | 47°44′03″N 122°38′53″W | |
| KPUW | PUW | Pullman-Moscow Regional Airport | Pullman | Washington | 46°44′38″N 117°06′29″W | |
| KPVB | | Platteville Municipal Airport | Platteville | Wisconsin | 42°41′22″N 090°26′40″W | |
| KPVC | | Provincetown Municipal Airport | Provincetown | Massachusetts | 42°04′19″N 070°13′17″W | |
| KPVD | PVD | T.F. Green State Airport | Providence | Rhode Island | 41°43′26″N 071°25′44″W | |
| KPVE | | Beech River Regional Airport | Darden | Tennessee | 35°39′23″N 088°11′43″W | |
| KPVF | | Placerville Airport | Placerville | California | 38°43′27″N 120°45′12″W | |
| KPVG | | Hampton Roads Executive Airport | Chesapeake | Virginia | 36°46′49″N 076°26′56″W | |
| KPVJ | | Pauls Valley Municipal Airport | Pauls Valley | Oklahoma | 34°42′34″N 097°13′24″W | |
| KPVU | PVU | Provo Municipal Airport | Provo | Utah | 40°13′09″N 111°43′24″W | |
| KPVW | PVW | Hale County Airport | Plainview | Texas | 34°10′08″N 101°42′57″W | |
| KPVZ | | Casement Airport | Painesville | Ohio | 41°43′59″N 081°13′08″W | Closed |
| KPWA | PWA | Wiley Post Airport | Oklahoma City | Oklahoma | 35°32′03″N 097°38′49″W | |
| KPWC | | Pine River Regional Airport | Pine River | Minnesota | 46°43′29″N 094°22′54″W | |
| KPWD | | Sher-Wood Airport | Plentywood | Montana | 48°47′20″N 104°31′23″W | |
| KPWG | | McGregor Executive | Waco | Texas | 31°29′06″N 097°18′59″W | |
| KPWK | PWK | Chicago Executive Airport (formerly PalWaukee) | Wheeling | Illinois | 42°06′51″N 087°54′06″W | |
| KPWM | PWM | Portland International Jetport | Portland | Maine | 43°38′46″N 070°18′33″W | |
| KPWT | PWT | Bremerton National Airport | Bremerton | Washington | 47°29′25″N 122°45′53″W | |
| KPXE | PXE | Perry-Houston County Airport | Perry | Georgia | 32°30′38″N 083°46′02″W | |
| KPYG | | Pageland Airport | Pageland | South Carolina | 34°44′31″N 080°20′42″W | |
| KPYM | PYM | Plymouth Municipal Airport | Plymouth | Massachusetts | 41°54′32″N 070°43′44″W | |
| KPYN | | Piedmont Municipal Airport | Piedmont | Missouri | 37°07′36″N 090°42′46″W | |
| KPYP | PYP | Centre-Piedmont-Cherokee County Regional Airport | Centre | Alabama | 34°05′24″N 085°36′36″W | |
| KPYX | PYX | Perryton Ochiltree County Airport | Perryton | Texas | 36°24′46″N 100°45′07″W | |
| KPZQ | | Presque Isle County Airport | Rogers City | Michigan | 45°24′26″N 083°48′46″W | |
