= Korc =

Korc or KORC may refer to:

== People ==
- Agata Korc, Polish swimmer (born 1986)
- Rafał Korc, Polish Paralympic athlete (born 1982)

== Radio call signs ==
- KORC-LP, a low-power radio station (105.9 FM) licensed to serve Corvallis, Oregon, United States
- KVTT, a radio station (1110 AM) licensed to serve Mineral Wells, Texas, United States, which held the call sign KORC from 1947 to 1981
- KWDP, a radio station (820 AM) licensed to serve Waldport, Oregon, which held the call sign KORC from 1991 to 2011
- KZHC-FM, a radio station (92.7 FM) licensed to serve Burns, Oregon, which held the call signs KORC-FM and KORC from 2010 to 2017

== Other uses ==
- Orange City Municipal Airport (ICAO: KORC), a closed airport in Orange City, Iowa
