= LVJ =

LVJ may refer to:

- Liverpool James Street railway station, Liverpool, National Rail station code
- Pearland Regional Airport, Brazoria County, Texas, FAA LID airport code
