= OMH =

OMH may refer to:

- Omh (trigraph), a Latin-script trigraph used in Irish
- musicOMH, a music website
- Office of Minority Health, an office of the United States government
- Office of Mental Health, an agency of the New York state government
- The Old Malthouse School, a closed preparatory school in Langton Matravers, Dorset, England
- Old Market Hall, Shrewsbury, an Elizabethan building in Shrewsbury, Shropshire, England
- Orange County Airport (Virginia), in Orange County, Virginia, United States (FAA location identifier)
- Urmia Airport, in Urmia County, West Azerbaijan Province, Iran (IATA airport code)
- Operation Midnight Hammer, a 2025 American military action against Iran
