= OEA =

OEA may refer to:

- Oea, the Phoenician name for Tripoli, Libya
- Office of Economic Adjustment
- Ohio Education Association
- Oleoylethanolamide, an endogenous peroxisome proliferator-activated receptor alpha (PPAR -α) agonist
- Oregon Education Association
- Organización de los Estados Americanos (Organization of American States), a group dedicated to strengthening ties in the western hemisphere
- O'Neal Airport's IATA code
- Operadora Estatal de Aeropuertos, a Mexican airline agency and owner of Hermanos Serdán International Airport
- Office of the Employment Advocate, Australian agency now subsumed under the Workplace Authority
