= W45 =

W45 may refer to:

- W45 (nuclear warhead)
- Luray Caverns Airport, in Page County, Virginia, United States
- Mizuho Station, in Hokkaido, Japan
- W45, a classification in masters athletics
- W45, a Toyota W transmission
