= Halifax County Airport =

- IATA: RZZ; ICAO: KRZZ; FAA LID: RZZ

Summary
- Airport type: Public
- Owner: City of Roanoke Rapids
- Serves: Roanoke Rapids, North Carolina
- Elevation AMSL: 256 ft (78 m)
- Coordinates: 36°26′22″N 077°42′34″W

Map
- Location of airport in North Carolina

Runways
Direction	Length		Surface
Direction	ft	m	Surface
5/23	4,006	1,221	Asphalt
16/34	2,100	640	Turf

Statistics (2007)
- Aircraft operations: 31,500
- Based aircraft: 24
- Source: Federal Aviation Administration

Halifax County Airport (IATA: RZZ, ICAO: KRZZ, FAA LID: RZZ) was a public use airport located three nautical miles (6 km) southwest of the central business district of Roanoke Rapids, a city in Halifax County, North Carolina, United States. It was owned by the City of Roanoke Rapids. This airport was included in the National Plan of Integrated Airport Systems for 2009–2013, which categorized it as a general aviation facility.

== Facilities and aircraft ==
This airport KRZZ, is closed. The Halifax Northampton airport KIXA is open.

Halifax County Airport covered an area of 281 acres (114 ha) at an elevation of 256 feet (78 m) above mean sea level. It had two runways: 5/23 is 4,006 by 75 feet (1,221 x 23 m) with an asphalt surface; 16/34 is 2,100 by 150 feet (640 x 46 m) with a turf surface.

For the 12-month period ending August 14, 2007, the airport had 31,500 aircraft operations, an average of 86 per day: 89% general aviation, 7% air taxi, and 4% military. At that time there were 24 aircraft based at this airport: 96% single-engine and 4% multi-engine.

According to recent satellite imagery, it appears the airport is now being used as a solar farm.

== See also ==
- Halifax-Northampton Regional Airport (36°19′47″N 077°38′07″W)
- List of airports in North Carolina
