= Sippia Paul Hull =

Chickasaw woman and early settler (1852–1937)

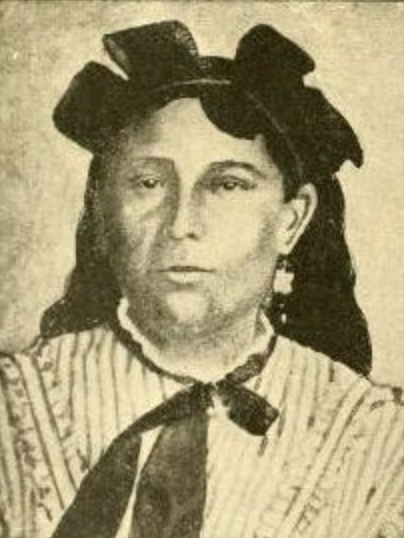
- Hull in 1891
- Born: 1852; Chickasaw Nation, Indian Territory
- Died: February 15, 1937 (aged 84); Gorman, California, U.S.
- Citizenship: Chickasaw Nation, American
- Children: 7
- Relatives: Homer Paul (politician)

Sippia Paul Hull (1852 – February 15, 1937) was a Chickasaw woman and early settler of Pauls Valley, Oklahoma, where she managed a large farm and household alongside her husband. She documented her experiences growing up in the Chickasaw Nation and living through significant historical events in Indian Territory, with her writings preserved in the Pauls Valley Memorial Library.

== Early life and education ==
Hull, born in 1852 in the Cross Timbers region of the Chickasaw Nation, was the daughter of Smith Paul, and a Chickasaw woman from Mississippi. Her early years were marked by the wilderness, where deer, antelope, and buffalo were plentiful. Paul's father served as a government agent for friendly Native American tribes in the region and was a landowner with several acres under cultivation.

During her childhood, Hull and her family lived in Pauls Valley, Oklahoma, a settlement founded by her father in the area that later bore his name. Due to conflicts with neighboring tribes, her family experienced periods of fear and tension, particularly from raids by warring tribes. Her family and other settlers frequently took refuge in nearby fields and woods. Hull's education began at home, where her father hired teachers to provide instruction for her and her siblings. She also attended a government-established Indian school at Fort Sill after the Civil War.

Hull married Jim Arnold at the age of sixteen. Arnold later disappeared on a trip to Texas, and she assumed he had died.

== Career ==
Hull enrolled herself and her daughter at a school in Fort Sill operated by Quakers. It was here that she met William Hull, an Englishman working under Indian agent Lawrie Tatum. The two married, and they established a farm on the Washita River near Whitebead, Oklahoma. Hull played a significant role in managing her family's farm and household. Her skills included spinning cotton into thread, weaving cloth, making clothes, and producing food staples like sausage. She also learned to manufacture various household items, such as hats and caps for her family.

Hull wrote about her experiences growing up in the Chickasaw Nation. These accounts were later stored in the archives of the Pauls Valley Memorial Library.

== Personal life ==
Hull's personal life was closely intertwined with her family's legacy in Pauls Valley. Her father, Smith Paul, was a well-known figure in the region, and Hull lived through pivotal moments in the early history of Indian Territory, including interactions with both friendly and hostile Native American groups. She and William Hull had six children. Later in life, Hull and her husband moved to California, where they settled after William's health deteriorated. William eventually died in California, and Hull remained there with her children. Hull died at her daughter's home on February 15, 1937, in Gorman, California from flu complications and old age.

Her great-nephew Homer Paul was a member of the Oklahoma Legislature.
