= Wabash Municipal Airport =

- IATA: none; ICAO: KIWH; FAA LID: IWH

Summary
- Airport type: Public
- Owner: Wabash BOAC
- Operator: Northern Indiana Aviation
- Location: Wabash
- Elevation AMSL: 796 ft / 243 m
- Coordinates: 40°45′43″N 085°47′56″W
- Website: www.wabashairport.com/

Map
- Location of airport in Indiana/United States IWH (the United States)

Runways
Direction	Length		Surface
Direction	ft	m	Surface
9/27	4,401	1,341	Asphalt
18/36	1,940	591	Asphalt
- Source: Federal Aviation Administration

Wabash Municipal Airport (ICAO: KIWH, FAA LID: IWH) is a public airport 3 nautical miles (5.6 km; 3.5 mi) southeast of Wabash, in Wabash County, Indiana. The airport was founded in May 1958.
