= Panola County Airport =

Airport in Mississippi, US

- IATA: none; ICAO: KPMU; FAA LID: PMU

Summary
- Airport type: Public
- Owner: Panola County
- Serves: Batesville, Mississippi
- Elevation AMSL: 221.1 ft / 67 m
- Coordinates: 34°21′48.6″N 089°53′34.4″W
- Interactive map of Panola County Airport

Runways
Direction	Length		Surface
Direction	ft	m	Surface
1/19	5,001	1,524	Asphalt
- Source: Federal Aviation Administration

Panola County Airport (ICAO: KPMU, FAA LID: PMU) is a public-use airport located 4 km (2.5 mi) from the town of Batesville, Mississippi. The National Plan of Integrated Airport Systems for 2011–2015 categorized it as a general aviation facility.

== Facilities ==
The airport is located at an elevation of 221 ft (67 m). It has one runway: 1/19, which is 5001 x 75 ft. (1524 x 23 m). The airport has no control tower. In 2024, the airport was awarded $108,000 as part of an AIG grant, as part of a larger $35 million grant to airports across Mississippi.
