= Pauls Valley, Oklahoma =

City in Oklahoma, US

- City
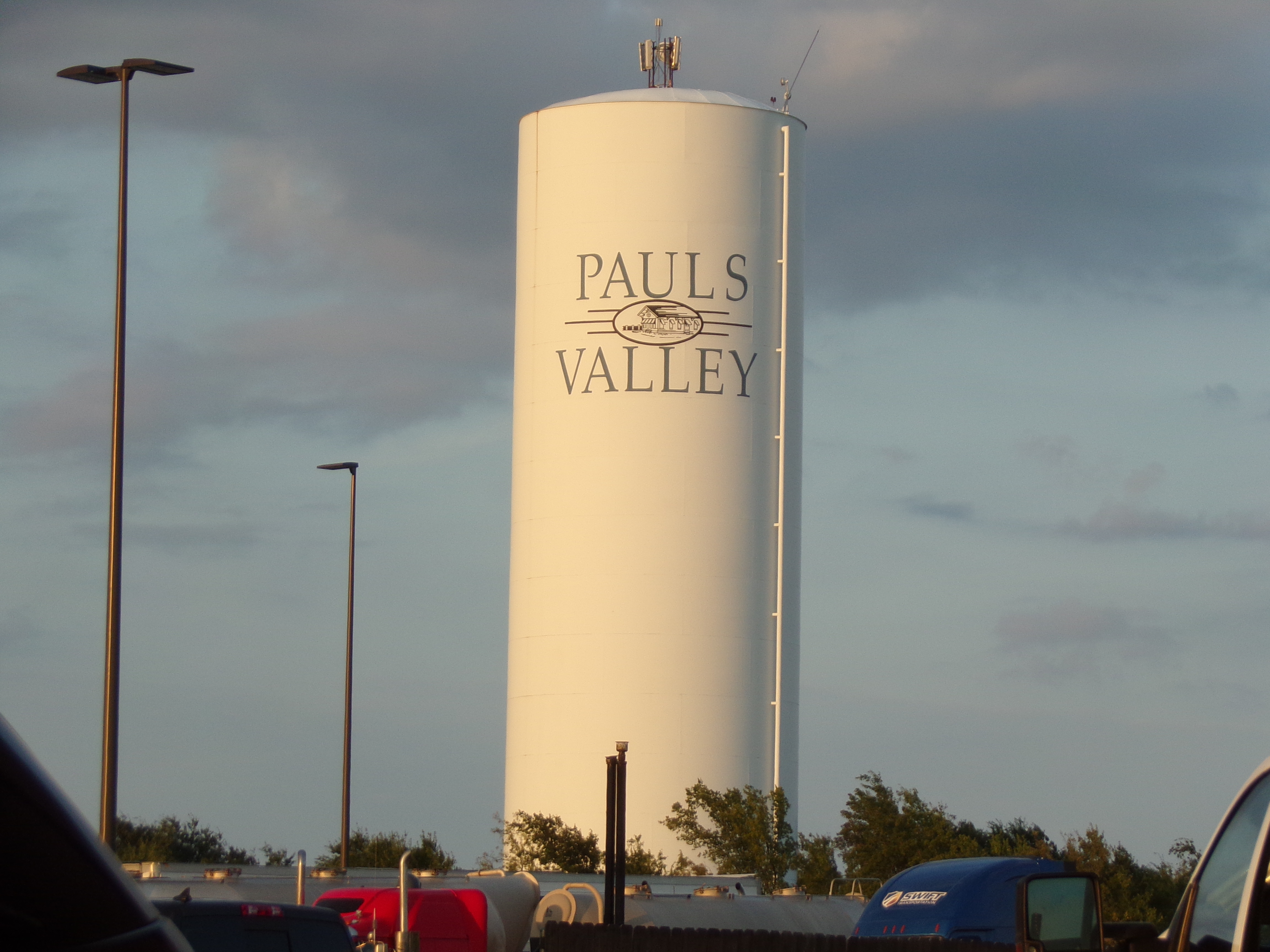
- Water tower in Pauls Valley

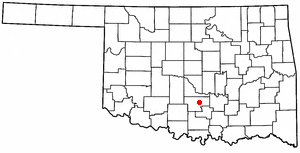
- Location of Pauls Valley, Oklahoma
- Coordinates: 34°44′16″N 97°13′51″W
- Country: United States
- State: Oklahoma
- County: Garvin

Area
  - Total: 8.49 sq mi (21.99 km^{2})
  - Land: 8.32 sq mi (21.56 km^{2})
  - Water: 0.17 sq mi (0.43 km^{2})
- Elevation: 873 ft (266 m)

Population (2020)
  - Total: 5,992
  - Density: 719.9/sq mi (277.94/km^{2})
- Time zone: UTC-6 (Central (CST))
  - Summer (DST): UTC-5 (CDT)
- ZIP code: 73075
- Area code: 405
- FIPS code: 40-57550
- GNIS feature ID: 2411387
- Website: www.paulsvalley.com

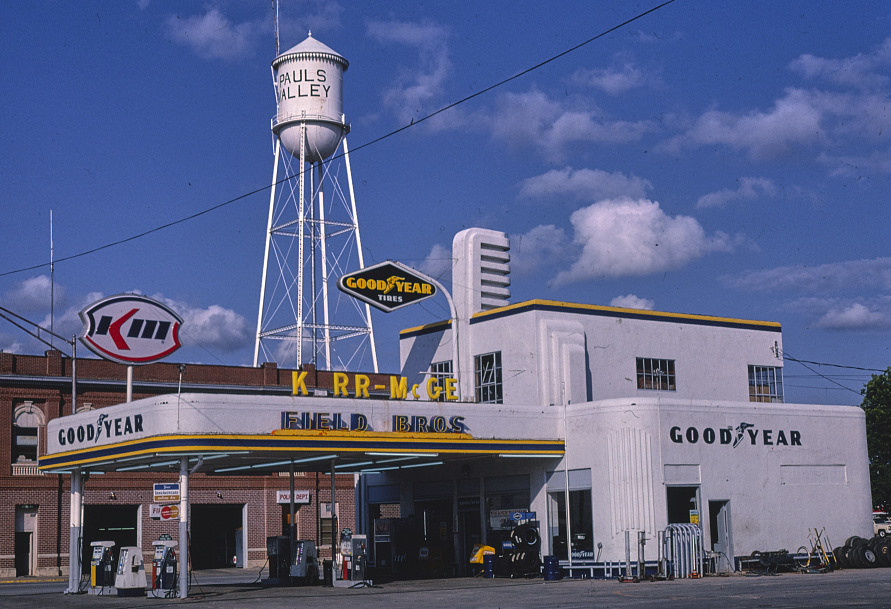
Kerr-McGee Service Station in Pauls Valley, 1982

Pauls Valley is a city in and the county seat of Garvin County, Oklahoma, United States. The population was 5,992 at the 2020 census, a decline of 3.2 percent from the figure of 6,187 in 2010. It was settled by and named for Smith Paul, a North Carolina native who married a Chickasaw woman and became a citizen of the Chickasaw Nation before the Civil War. The town economy is largely based on agriculture and oil production.

== History ==
The area that eventually became the city of Pauls Valley was one of the earliest European-American settlements in what was then known as Indian Territory. Smith Paul, born in 1809 in New Bern, North Carolina, discovered the fertile bottom land which is now Pauls Valley while a member of a wagon train traveling to California. Paul described the land as "a section where the bottom land was rich and blue stem grass grew so high that a man on horseback was almost hidden in its foliage."

The Tri-Party Treaty of January 1, 1837, ceded this part of what is now the State of Oklahoma to the Chickasaw Nation. When the Chickasaw people were relocated to Indian Territory that year, Smith Paul moved with them and married Ela-Teecha, a Chickasaw woman. In 1847, the Pauls established a plantation on the rich Garvin County bottom land, where Rush Creek joined the Washita River, which became known to locals as "Smith Paul's Valley". Mail to the Pauls was often addressed to "Smith Paul's Large Farm". By 1871, postal service was established in the area, although the post office was designated "Paul's Valley, Arkansas", because the Indian Territory was being administered out of Arkansas at that time.

The Atchison, Topeka and Santa Fe Railway (a.k.a. Santa Fe Railway) shortened the name to "Paul's Valley" when it built a track through the community in 1887, completing its connection between Kansas and the Gulf Coast. The railroad brought growth and prosperity to Smith Paul's Valley. The first newspaper was published in 1887. The Pauls Valley town site was laid out in 1892, though the plat was not approved by the Dawes Commission until 1903.

At the time of its founding, Pauls Valley was located in Pickens County, Chickasaw Nation.

A U.S. courthouse was built in 1895. The first white school in Indian Territory was established, and brick buildings were built downtown. In 1909, the streets were bricked. Today, Pauls Valley has more brick streets—17,986 square yards (15,039 m^{2})—than any other town in the United States.

From 1948–1954, Pauls Valley was home to the Pauls Valley Raiders, a minor league baseball team. The Pauls Valley Raiders were a member of the Class D Sooner State League and an affiliate of the New York Giants (1952–1953). The Pauls Valley Raiders played at Wacker Park.

When the Santa Fe Railway discontinued its Lone Star route in 1979, the 1905 building fell into disuse. By 1985, the railroad had obtained a permit to raze the old depot. Adrienne Grimmet, who was then president of the Pauls Valley Historical Society, started a campaign to save the old structure. Her efforts resulted in the city's buying the depot and turning it over to the historical society for conversion into a museum. Individuals donated their time and skills, and local businesses either donated or discounted the cost of materials to perform the necessary renovations, which began in 1991.

In 1999, Amtrak began its Heartland Flyer service between Oklahoma City and Fort Worth, passing through Pauls Valley. City officials agreed to build a new waiting room for Amtrak passengers adjacent to the old depot. The new Pauls Valley station has a climate-controlled waiting area and restrooms, but is unstaffed, having no ticketing or baggage handling facilities. It also has a 10-car parking lot outside. The architecture was designed to be compatible with the old Santa Fe-style building.

The Oklahoma Cartoonists Hall of Fame, located in the Toy and Action Figure Museum, was opened in Pauls Valley in 2005.

=== Pauls Valley High School shooting ===
On April 7, 2026, a shooting occurred at Pauls Valley High School in Oklahoma. 20-year-old Victor Lee Hawkins attempted to shoot a person in the lobby before being tackled by principal Kirk Moore, who was shot once in the leg. Hawkins had extensively researched the Columbine massacre and planned to kill students and staff, then himself.

Moore was celebrated as a hero after the shooting, and Pauls Valley High School students elected him prom king on April 17, ten days after the shooting.

== Geography ==
Pauls Valley is located east of the center of Garvin County. It is 57 miles (92 km) south of Oklahoma City, at the junction of Interstate 35 and State Highway 19.

According to the United States Census Bureau, the city has a total area of 8.7 square miles (22.6 km^{2}), of which 8.6 square miles (22.2 km^{2}) is land and 0.2 square miles (0.4 km^{2}), or 1.90%, is water. The Washita River, a tributary of the Red River, flows through the city north of the downtown area.

The Pauls Valley City Lake, located about 3 miles (5 km) northeast of the center of town, offers recreational opportunities, including fishing, camping, swimming, Jet Skiing, hunting, and a pavilion for groups to use.

== Demographics ==
Historical population
Census	Pop.	Note	%±
1900	1,467		—
1910	2,689		83.3%
1920	3,694		37.4%
1930	4,235		14.6%
1940	5,104		20.5%
1950	6,896		35.1%
1960	6,856		−0.6%
1970	5,769		−15.9%
1980	5,664		−1.8%
1990	6,150		8.6%
2000	6,256		1.7%
2010	6,187		−1.1%
2020	5,992		−3.2%
U.S. Decennial Census

=== 2020 census ===
As of the 2020 census, Pauls Valley had a population of 5,992. The median age was 37.7 years. 25.3% of residents were under the age of 18 and 18.1% of residents were 65 years of age or older. For every 100 females there were 93.2 males, and for every 100 females age 18 and over there were 90.4 males age 18 and over.

92.7% of residents lived in urban areas, while 7.3% lived in rural areas.

There were 2,398 households in Pauls Valley, of which 31.7% had children under the age of 18 living in them. Of all households, 37.2% were married-couple households, 21.6% were households with a male householder and no spouse or partner present, and 33.1% were households with a female householder and no spouse or partner present. About 33.6% of all households were made up of individuals and 14.9% had someone living alone who was 65 years of age or older.

There were 2,965 housing units, of which 19.1% were vacant. Among occupied housing units, 49.3% were owner-occupied and 50.7% were renter-occupied. The homeowner vacancy rate was 3.2% and the rental vacancy rate was 18.7%.

Racial composition as of the 2020 census
Race	Percent
White	65.0%
Black or African American	4.4%
American Indian and Alaska Native	7.1%
Asian	0.7%
Native Hawaiian and Other Pacific Islander	0.1%
Some other race	10.1%
Two or more races	12.5%
Hispanic or Latino (of any race)	19.4%

=== 2000 census ===
As of the 2000 census, there were 6,256 people, 2,475 households, and 1,591 families residing in the city. The population density was 749.9 inhabitants per square mile (289.5/km^{2}). There were 3,007 housing units at an average density of 360.4 per square mile (139.2/km^{2}). The racial makeup of the city was 79.27% White, 5.29% African American, 7.40% Native American, 0.66% Asian, 0.06% Pacific Islander, 3.47% from other races, and 3.85% from two or more races. Hispanic or Latino of any race were 7.53% of the population.

There were 2,475 households, out of which 30.5% had children under the age of 18 living with them, 46.6% were married couples living together, 14.1% had a female householder with no husband present, and 35.7% were non-families. 32.0% of all households were made up of individuals, and 17.4% had someone living alone who was 65 years of age or older. The average household size was 2.38 and the average family size was 3.00.

In the city, the population was spread out, with 24.4% under the age of 18, 9.2% from 18 to 24, 27.1% from 25 to 44, 20.6% from 45 to 64, and 18.7% who were 65 years of age or older. The median age was 38 years. For every 100 females, there were 88.5 males. For every 100 females age 18 and over, there were 84.6 males.

The median income for a household in the city was $26,654, and the median income for a family was $32,348. Males had a median income of $27,014 versus $18,965 for females. The per capita income for the city was $15,553. About 12.9% of families and 20.7% of the population were below the poverty line, including 23.0% of those under age 18 and 17.7% of those age 65 or over.

== Economy ==
Agricultural is the primary economic activity in the Pauls Valley area. Corn, wheat, hay, and cotton have been grown successfully in the region, and cattle production is a major activity. Petroleum industry services is the second largest activity in the region. The nearby Golden Trend oil and gas field is still one of the major producing fields in Oklahoma. In more recent years, the town has attracted some light manufacturing plants such as plastics products.

Established in 1921, the Pauls Valley Chamber of Commerce is today a 180-member business association with the mission of advancing the commercial, industrial, educational, civic, general business and cultural climate of Pauls Valley. It is a partner with businesses active on the I-35 corridor of central Oklahoma. Pauls Valley is located on Exits 70 and 72.

Major employers include Walmart Distribution Center, Walmart Supercenter, Pauls Valley Public Schools, Amor Flexibles North America, Seth Wadley Auto Group, Covercraft, Garvin County Community Living Center, and the City of Pauls Valley. Pauls Valley is also the home of Field's Pies, which are sold in grocery stores across Oklahoma and surrounding states.

== Education ==
Pauls Valley Public Schools provides basic education through high school for Pauls Valley.

Public schools:

- Pauls Valley High School
- Pauls Valley Junior High School
- Pauls Valley Elementary School
- Pauls Valley Intermediate School

== Transportation ==
=== Railroad ===
The Pauls Valley station is one of only five Amtrak passenger stations still operating in Oklahoma. It shares property with the railroad station that was originally built by the Santa Fe Railroad in 1905. The Amtrak facility handles two trains per day (the Heartland Flyer). Amtrak does not provide either ticketing or baggage services at this station.

=== Air ===
Pauls Valley Municipal Airport (PVJ) is a city-owned, general aviation facility located 2 miles (3 km) south of the Pauls Valley business district. (Note: PVJ is the FAA Identifier Code. There is no ICAO identifier for this facility.) The street address is 500 Airport Road. The airport is open Monday through Friday between 8:00 AM and 5:00 PM Central Time.

=== Bus ===
- Greyhound Lines
- Delta Public Transit

== Notable people ==
- Clifford Cleveland Brooks (1886–1944), Georgia native, sold real estate in Pauls Valley c. 1910; member of the Louisiana State Senate from 1924 to 1932 from northeast delta parishes
- Roger Eason (1918–1998), National Football League player, born in Pauls Valley
- Joseph Glasco (1925–1996), abstract expressionist painter and sculptor
- Sippia Paul Hull (1852–1937), Chickasaw, early settler, daughter of Pauls Valley founder Smith Paul
- Jennings Poindexter (1910–1983), Major League Baseball pitcher, born in Pauls Valley
- T. J. Rushing (born 1983), National Football League player, born in Pauls Valley
- Jean Shepard (1933–2016), singer and songwriter, born in Pauls Valley (birth name Ollie Imogene Shepherd)
- G. D. Spradlin (1920–2011), movie and TV actor, born in Pauls Valley
- Ben T. Williams (1910–1982), Oklahoma Supreme Court justice (1953–1982)
- Alma Wilson (1917–1999), first female appointed to serve as an Oklahoma Supreme Court justice and later the first female chief justice of the Oklahoma Supreme Court (1982–1997)
