= Halifax–Northampton Regional Airport =

- IATA: none; ICAO: KIXA; FAA LID: IXA

Summary
- Airport type: Public
- Owner: Halifax–Northampton Regional Airport Authority
- Serves: Roanoke Rapids, North Carolina
- Elevation AMSL: 145 ft (44 m)
- Coordinates: 36°19′47″N 077°38′07″W

Map
- Location of airport in North Carolina

Runways
| Direction | Length | | Surface |
| Direction | ft | m | Surface |
|---|---|---|---|
| 2/20 | 5,500 | 1,676 | Asphalt |

Statistics (2009)
- Aircraft operations: 2,900
- Based aircraft: 20
- Source: Federal Aviation Administration

Halifax–Northampton Regional Airport (ICAO: KIXA, FAA LID: IXA) is a public use airport located eight nautical miles (9 mi, 15 km) south of the central business district of Roanoke Rapids, a city in Halifax County, North Carolina, United States. It is owned by the Halifax–Northampton Regional Airport Authority. This airport is included in the National Plan of Integrated Airport Systems for 2011–2015, which categorized it as a general aviation facility.

Although most U.S. airports use the same three-letter location identifier for the FAA and IATA, this airport is assigned IXA by the FAA but has no designation from the IATA (which assigned IXA to Singerbhil Airport in Agartala, India). The airport's ICAO identifier is KIXA.

== Facilities and aircraft ==
Halifax–Northampton Regional Airport covers an area of 797 acres (323 ha) at an elevation of 145 feet (44 m) above mean sea level. It has one runway designated 2/20 with an asphalt surface measuring 5,500 by 101 feet (1,676 x 31 m).

For the 12-month period ending July 17, 2009, the airport had 2,900 aircraft operations, an average of 241 per month: 90% general aviation and 10% military. At that time there were 20 aircraft based at this airport: 90% single-engine and 10% multi-engine.

== See also ==
- List of airports in North Carolina
- Halifax County Airport (36°26′22″N 077°42′34″W)
