= Pauls Valley Municipal Airport =

Airport in Oklahoma, United States of America

- IATA: none; ICAO: KPVJ; FAA LID: PVJ

Summary
- Airport type: Public
- Owner: City of Pauls Valley
- Serves: Pauls Valley, Oklahoma
- Elevation AMSL: 971 ft (296 m)
- Coordinates: 34°42′34″N 097°13′24″W

Map
- Location of airport in Oklahoma PVJ (the United States)

Runways
| Direction | Length | | Surface |
| Direction | ft | m | Surface |
|---|---|---|---|
| 17/35 | 5,001 | 1,524 | Concrete |

Statistics (2009)
- Aircraft operations: 3,600
- Based aircraft: 38
- Source: Federal Aviation Administration

Pauls Valley Municipal Airport (ICAO: KPVJ, FAA LID: PVJ) is a city-owned, public-use airport located two nautical miles (4 km) south of the central business district of Pauls Valley, a city in Garvin County, Oklahoma, United States. It is included in the National Plan of Integrated Airport Systems for 2011–2015, which categorized it as a general aviation facility.

Although most U.S. airports use the same three-letter location identifier for the FAA and IATA, this airport is assigned PVJ by the FAA, but has no designation from the IATA.

== Facilities and aircraft ==
Pauls Valley Municipal Airport covers an area of 480 acres (194 ha) at an elevation of 971 feet (296 m) above mean sea level. It has one runway with concrete surfaces: 17/35 is 5,001 by 100 feet (1,524 x 30 m).

For the 12-month period ending February 10, 2009, the airport had 3,600 aircraft operations, an average of 300 per month: 83% general aviation and 17% military. At that time there were 38 aircraft based at this airport: 92% single-engine, 5% ultralight, and 3% helicopter.

== See also ==
- List of airports in Oklahoma
