= South Haven Area Regional Airport =

Public use airport in Michigan, United States

Coordinates: 42°21′10″N 086°15′13″W

South Haven Area Regional Airport is a public-use airport located 3 miles south of South Haven, Michigan. It is publicly owned by the city through the South Haven Area Regional Airport Authority.

In 2019, the airport was awarded with the Airport of the Year Award General Aviation Airport Category. The award is presented in recognition of sustained excellence in contribution to aviation progress in the State of Michigan.

== Facilities and aircraft ==
The airport has two runways. Runway 5/23 is 4800 x 75 ft (1463 x 23 m) and is paved with asphalt. Runway 14/32 is 3260 x 190 ft (994 x 58 m) and is turf.

The airport has a fixed-base operator that sells fuel – both avgas and jet fuel – as well as services such as general maintenance, courtesy and rental cars, a conference room, a crew lounge, snooze rooms, and more.

For the 12-month period ending December 31, 2020, the airport had 27,000 aircraft operations, an average of 74 per day. It was composed entirely of general aviation. For the same time period, there are 40 aircraft based on the field, all airplanes: 36 single-engine and 4 multi-engine.

== Accidents and incidents ==
- On August 14, 2001, a Cessna 177 sustained substantial damage during an on-ground collision with a ditch while landing on runway 04 at the South Haven Area Regional Airport. According to the pilot, during the landing, at approximately five feet above the ground, there was a "strong crosswind gust." The pilot reported that after he encountered the gust of wind he, "... should have applied full power and initiated a go-around." The pilot stated that the airplane departed the right side of the runway and impacted a ditch. The probable cause was found to be the pilot's failure to maintain aircraft control during the landing.
- On July 15, 2006, an Armpriest Breezy was destroyed when it impacted a drainage ditch during an initial climbout from South Haven Area Regional Airport. The pilot reported that during takeoff with about "3/4 of the runway gone, there was a pronounced vibration from [the] engine." The pilot stated he pulled the throttle back to idle but a "substantial" vibration was still present. The pilot reported he shut the engine off and attempted to land on runway 14 before the crash. The probable cause was found to be an inadvertent stall by pilot during climb following propeller blade damage from the compartment door separation after takeoff. The low altitude and airspeed not maintained by the pilot were additional causes.
- On November 24, 2006, a Cessna 150 was damaged during landing when it departed the runway surface and nosed over in a ditch. The pilot reported that he attempted a landing BUT executed a go-around. He reported that, during the second landing attempt, the airplane touched down and veered to the left. The airplane subsequently went off the runway and into a ditch along the side of the runway. The airplane nosed over in the ditch.
- On June 15, 2009, a Cessna A188B crashed while landing on the grass runway at South Haven Regional. The pilot said he lowered the aircraft's nose upon reaching the paved taxiway, but the airplane bounced when contacting the taxiway and veered right. The pilot attempted to correct, but the airplane ground-looped on the paved intersecting runway/taxiway.
- On August 1, 2021, a Piper Archer made an emergency landing at South Haven Regional Airport while en route from Wisconsin to Ohio.
- On August 2, 2022, an Aerospace 600 aircraft crashed a mile from South Haven Regional Airport. The crash is under investigation by the South Haven Police, Michigan State Police, the Van Buren and Allegan county sheriff's offices, the FAA, and the U.S. Air Force.

== See also ==
- List of airports in Michigan
