= Presque Isle County Airport =

Public use airport in Rogers City, Michigan

Coordinates: 45°24′26″N 083°48′47″W

Presque Isle County Airport (ICAO: KPZQ, FAA LID: PZQ) is a public-use airport located 1 mile south of Rogers City, Michigan. It is publicly owned by Presque Isle County.

The airport is located near the site of a proposed wind farm. Airport leaders oppose the construction of this farm because its proximity to the airport means the airport could lose the GPS instrument approach procedures that guide airplanes to the airport's runway in poor weather conditions. Nine of the towers would protrude into the GPS approach paths, and all would top out in the airspace restricted for the airport.

The airport has been the focus of attention from city leaders, who want to see the airport continue to receive funding to support growth at the airport. While nearby Leo E. Goetz Airport faced financial struggles, Presque Isle County fought for additional funding the encourage more pilots to fly into the airport and stay longer.

Presque Isle County does not receive consistent federal funding, and most of its budget comes from the county. Additional revenue comes from the State of Michigan, and the airport earns more money from fuel sales, hangar rentals, and landing fees assessed to charter planes.

== Facilities and aircraft ==
The airport has a single paved runway. Runway 9/27 measures 4106 x 75 ft (1252 x 23 m) and is made of asphalt. The airport received a $58,000 grant from the Federal Aviation Administration in 2020 to improve its runway surface and sealing.

The aircraft has a fixed-base operator that sells avgas and offers amenities such as a courtesy car, a crew lounge, hangars and tiedowns, and more. Campsites and cooking are also available on-site for pilots.

For the 12-month period ending December 31, 2021, the airport had 996 aircraft operations per year, or about 83 per month. It was composed entirely of general aviation. For the same time period, 6 aircraft were based on the field, all single-engine airplanes.

== Accidents and incidents ==
- On September 11, 2021, a Quad City Ultralight Challenger II experimental airplane was substantially damaged when it was involved in an accident at Presque Isle County. The pilot, who did not have a pilot certificate, reported that about 100 ft into the takeoff roll on runway 27 the airplane began to swerve right, but before he could abort the takeoff he heard a bang and the airplane pitched up and rolled. A witness reported that the airplane abruptly pitched up, rolled right, and impacted the ground in a left-wing down attitude. The witness stated that the airplane had completed about 270° of right roll when the left wing impacted the ground.

== See also ==
- List of airports in Michigan
