= Pearland Regional Airport =

Coordinates: 29°31′17″N 095°14′32″W

- IATA: none; ICAO: KLVJ; FAA LID: LVJ

Summary
- Airport type: Privately owned, public use
- Owner: Clover Acquisition Corp.
- Operator: Texas Aviation Partners, LLC.
- Serves: Houston, Texas
- Location: Brazoria County, Texas (formerly in Pearland, Texas)
- Elevation AMSL: 44 ft (13 m)
- Website: www.flypearland.com

Map
- Location within Texas Location within the United States

Runways
Direction	Length		Surface
Direction	ft	m	Surface
14/32	4,313	1,315	Concrete

Statistics (2000)
- Aircraft operations: 87,125
- Based aircraft: 175
- Source: Federal Aviation Administration

Pearland Regional Airport (ICAO: KLVJ, FAA LID: LVJ) is in unincorporated Brazoria County, Texas, near Pearland in Greater Houston, 17 miles (27 km) south of Downtown Houston. It was formerly Clover Field.

Most U.S. airports use the same three-letter location identifier for the FAA and IATA, but Pearland Regional Airport is LVJ to the FAA and has no IATA code.

It was in the Pearland city limits from November 27, 2017, until March 26, 2018.

== Facilities ==
The airport covers 450 acres (180 ha); its single runway, 14/32, is 4,313 x 75 ft (1315 x 23 m) concrete. In the year ending May 30, 2000 the airport had 87,125 aircraft operations, average 238 per day: 99.7% general aviation and 0.3% air taxi. 175 aircraft were then based at the airport: 94% single-engine, 2% multi-engine and 4% helicopter.

== History ==
The airport was built in 1947 by Perry Brown and covered 320 acres at the time. Clover Acquisition purchased the property in 1957 and subsequently renamed it Clover Field. In 2003 the name was changed to Pearland Regional Airport.

The land with the airport, "Area L", is an unincorporated area; it was annexed by the City of Pearland on November 27, 2017. However, in March 2018 the Pearland city council voted to deannex the territory. It was de-annexed effective March 26, 2018.

== See also ==
- List of airports in Texas
