= Orange County Airport (Virginia) =

Airport in Virginia, United States

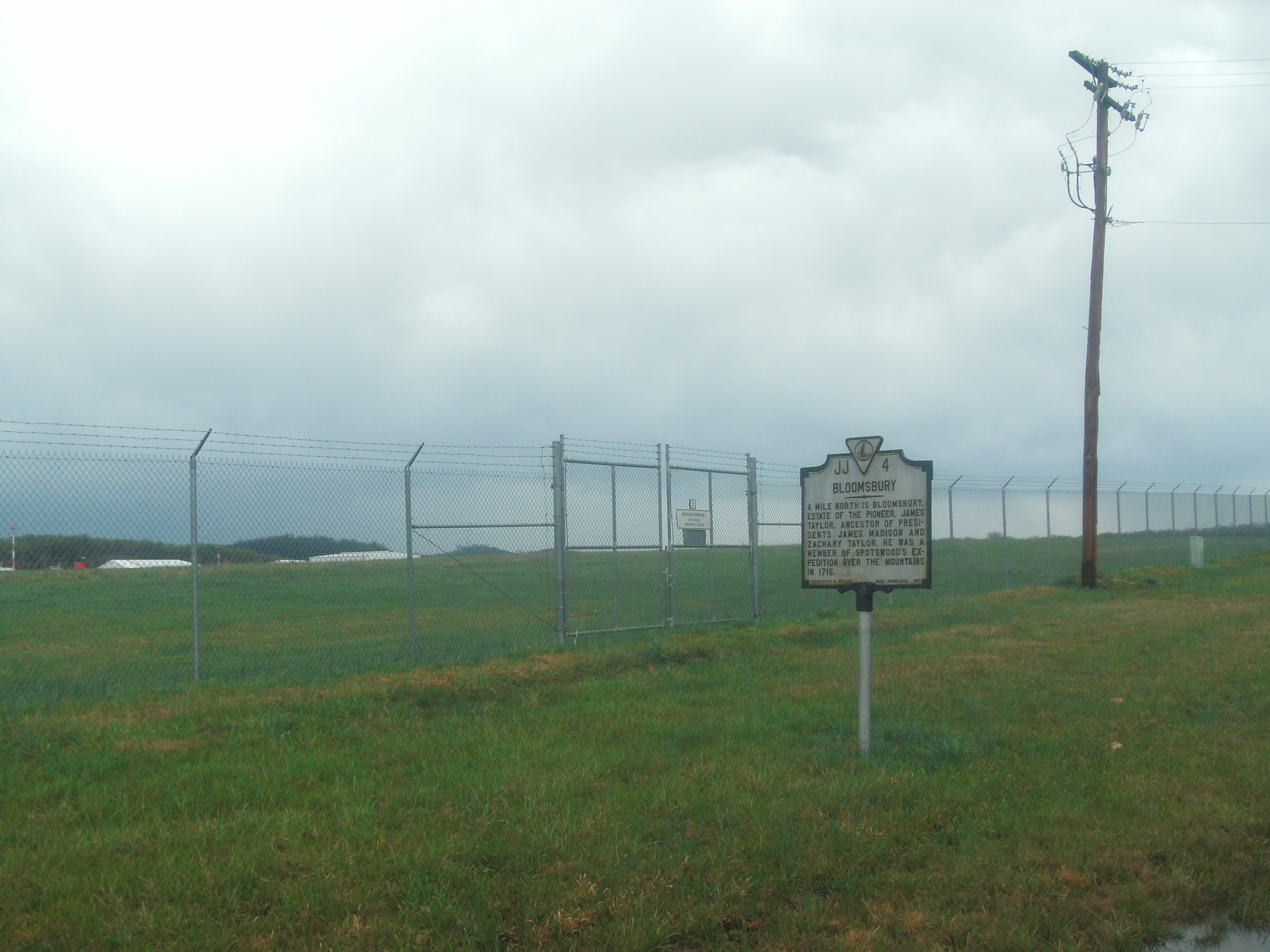
- IATA: none; ICAO: KOMH; FAA LID: OMH

Summary
- Airport type: Public
- Owner: Orange County
- Serves: Orange, Virginia
- Elevation AMSL: 464 ft (141 m)
- Coordinates: 38°14′50″N 078°02′44″W
- Website: OrangeCountyVA.gov/...

Map
- Location of airport in Virginia OMH (the United States)

Runways
Direction	Length		Surface
Direction	ft	m	Surface
8/26	3,200	975	Asphalt

Statistics (2011)
- Aircraft operations: 8,623
- Based aircraft: 27
- Source: Federal Aviation Administration

Orange County Airport (ICAO: KOMH, FAA LID: OMH) is a county-owned, public-use airport in Orange County, Virginia, United States. It is located three nautical miles (6 km) east of the central business district of Orange, Virginia. This airport is included in the National Plan of Integrated Airport Systems for 2011–2015, which categorized it as a general aviation facility.

Although most U.S. airports use the same three-letter location identifier for the FAA and IATA, this airport is assigned OMH by the FAA but has no designation from the IATA (which assigned OMH to Urumiyeh Airport in Urumiyeh, Iran). (Prior to 2000, the airport identifier was W93.)

== Facilities and aircraft ==
Orange County Airport covers an area of 322 acres (130 ha) at an elevation of 464 feet (141 m) above mean sea level. It has one runway designated 8/26 with an asphalt surface measuring 3,200 by 75 feet (975 x 23 m).

For the 12-month period ending May 31, 2014, the airport had 8,838 aircraft operations, an average of 24 per day: 98% general aviation, 1% military, and 1% air taxi. At that time there were 34 aircraft based at this airport: 79% single-engine, 9% multi-engine, 6% ultralight, and 6% helicopter.
