= Luray Caverns Airport =

Airport in Virginia, United States

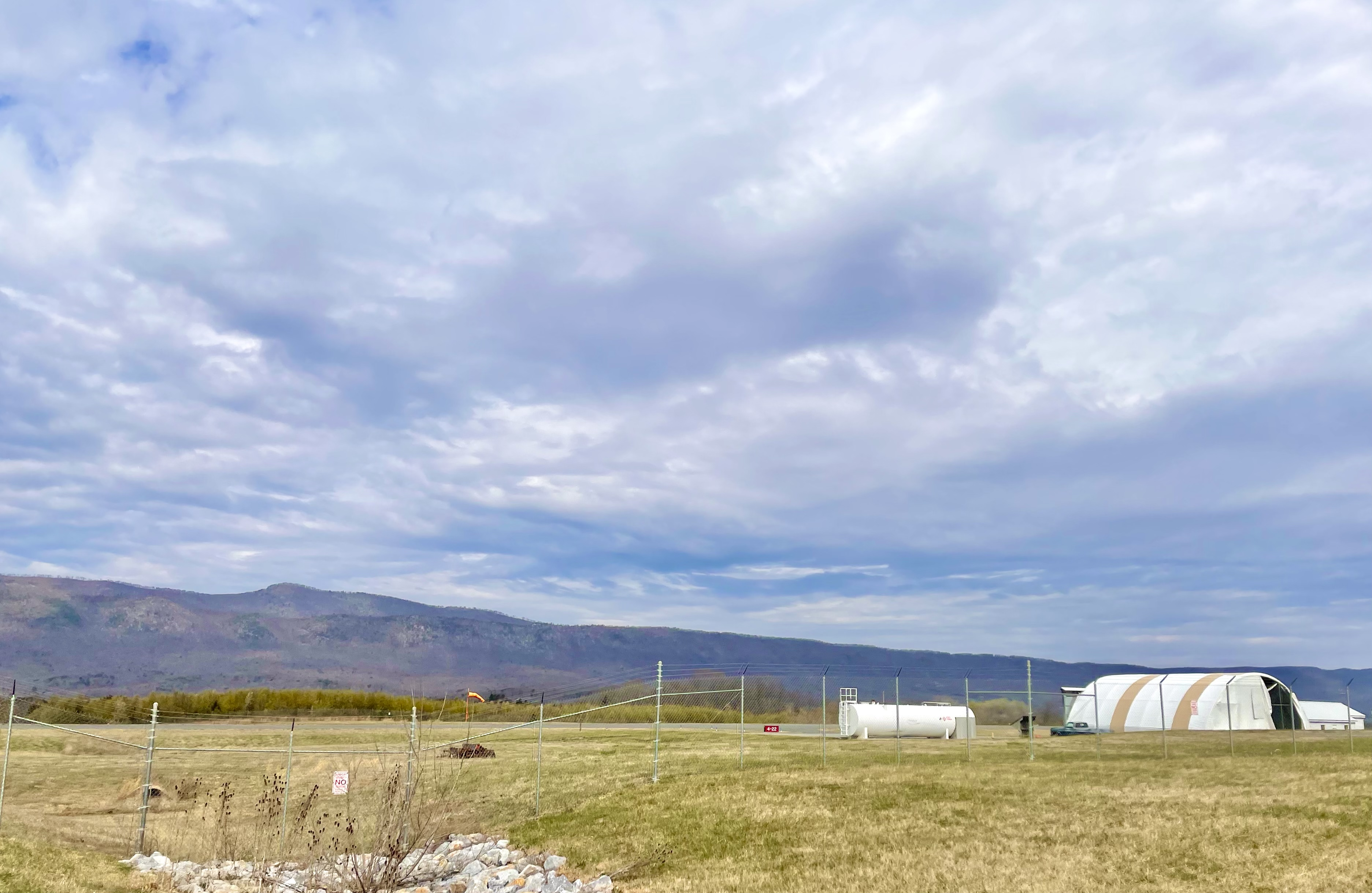
- IATA: none; ICAO: KLUA; FAA LID: LUA

Summary
- Airport type: Public
- Owner: Luray & Page County
- Serves: Luray, Virginia
- Elevation AMSL: 903 ft / 275 m
- Coordinates: 38°40′01″N 078°30′02″W

Map
- Location of airport in Virginia

Runways
Direction	Length		Surface
Direction	ft	m	Surface
4/22	3,125	952	Asphalt

Statistics (2011)
- Aircraft operations: 8,076
- Based aircraft: 14
- Source: Federal Aviation Administration

Luray Caverns Airport (ICAO: KLUA, FAA LID: LUA, formerly W45) is a public use airport located two nautical miles (4 km) west of the central business district of Luray, a town in Page County, Virginia, United States. The airport is owned by the Town of Luray and Page County, through the joint Luray-Page County Airport Authority. It is included in the National Plan of Integrated Airport Systems for 2011–2015, which categorized it as a general aviation airport.

Although most U.S. airports use the same three-letter location identifier for the FAA and IATA, this airport is assigned LUA by the FAA, but has no designation from the IATA (which assigned LUA to Tenzing-Hillary Airport in Lukla, Nepal).

== Facilities and aircraft ==
Luray Caverns Airport covers an area of 95 acres (38 ha) at an elevation of 903 feet (275 m) above mean sea level. It has one runway designated 4/22 with an asphalt surface measuring 3,125 by 75 feet (952 x 23 m).

For the 12-month period ending June 30, 2011, the airport had 8,076 aircraft operations, an average of 22 per day: 93% general aviation, 6% air taxi, and 1% military. At that time there were 14 aircraft based at this airport: 79% single-engine, and 21% multi-engine.

== History and expansion ==
Luray Caverns Airport began construction in 1969 on 49 acres of land donated by Ted Graves, owner of Luray Caverns. Operations began in 1971. The airport has expanded several times since. New hangars were built in 2008 and the property boundary was expanded.

Through 2027, the airport is expected to have more than $9,000,000 in improvements, including the addition of 18 more Tee hangar units, a new terminal building, a taxiway, and a fuel farm. The runway will also be extended to 4,400 feet.

Since the airport's opening, courtesy transportation has been available to and from the attractions of Luray Caverns upon request.
