= O'Neal Airport =

- IATA: ~~OEA~~; ICAO: ~~KOEA~~; FAA LID: ~~OEA~~

Summary
- Airport type: Public (Closed)
- Owner: Vincennes University
- Serves: Vincennes, Indiana
- Elevation AMSL: 414 ft (126 m)
- Coordinates: 38°41′29″N 087°33′08″W
- Interactive map of O'Neal Airport

Runways
Direction	Length		Surface
Direction	ft	m	Surface
9/27	3,450	1,052	Turf
14/32	2,625	800	Turf
3/21	2,350	716	Turf

Statistics (2004)
- Aircraft operations: 8,000
- Based aircraft: 18
- Source: Federal Aviation Administration

O'Neal Airport (IATA: ~~OEA~~, ICAO: ~~KOEA~~, FAA LID: ~~OEA~~) was a public use airport owned by Vincennes University and located in Lawrence County, Illinois, United States. The airport was one nautical mile (1.85 km) west of the central business district of Vincennes, a city in Knox County. The airport is now closed.

== Facilities and aircraft ==
O'Neal Airport covered an area of 250 acres (100 ha) at an elevation of 414 feet (126 m) above mean sea level. It had three runways with turf surfaces: 9/27 is 3,450 by 150 feet (1,052 x 46 m); 14/32 is 2,625 by 135 feet (800 x 41 m); 3/21 is 2,350 by 120 feet (716 x 37 m) and was also the location of an FAA navigational aid (NAVAID), the OEA non-directional beacon (NDB).

For the 12-month period ending August 31, 2004, the airport had 8,000 general aviation aircraft operations, an average of 21 per day. At that time there were 18 aircraft based at this airport: 67% single-engine, 22% multi-engine, 6% helicopter and 6% ultralight.
