= Orange City Municipal Airport =

Airport in Iowa, United States

- IATA: none; ICAO: KORC; FAA LID: ORC

Summary
- Airport type: Public
- Owner: City of Orange City
- Serves: Orange City, Iowa
- Elevation AMSL: 1,414 ft (431 m)
- Coordinates: 42°59′25″N 096°03′46″W

Map
- Location of airport in Iowa/United States ORC (the United States)

Runways
Direction	Length		Surface
Direction	ft	m	Surface
16/34	4,250	1,295	Concrete

Statistics (2009)
- Aircraft operations: 4,200
- Based aircraft: 11
- Source: Federal Aviation Administration

Orange City Municipal Airport (ICAO: KORC, FAA LID: ORC) was a city-owned public-use airport located one nautical mile (1.85 km) south of the central business district of Orange City, a city in Sioux County, Iowa, United States. This airport was included in the FAA's National Plan of Integrated Airport Systems for 2009–2013, which categorized it as a general aviation facility.

Although many U.S. airports use the same three-letter location identifier for the FAA and IATA, this facility was assigned ORC by the FAA but had no designation from the IATA (which assigned ORC to Orocue Airport in Orocue, Colombia).

In 2018 the airport was closed and replaced by the new Sioux County Regional Airport located 5 miles to the west.

== Facilities and aircraft ==
Orange City Municipal Airport covered an area of 80 acres (32 ha) at an elevation of 1,414 feet (431 m) above mean sea level. It had one runway designated 16/34 with a 4,250 by 60 feet (1,295 x 18 m) concrete surface. For the 12-month period ending August 19, 2009, the airport had 4,200 general aviation aircraft operations, an average of 81 per week: 43% local and 57% itinerant. At that time there were 11 aircraft based at this airport: 10 single-engine and 1 multi-engine.
