= 2020–21 Australian region cyclone season =

Tropical cyclone season

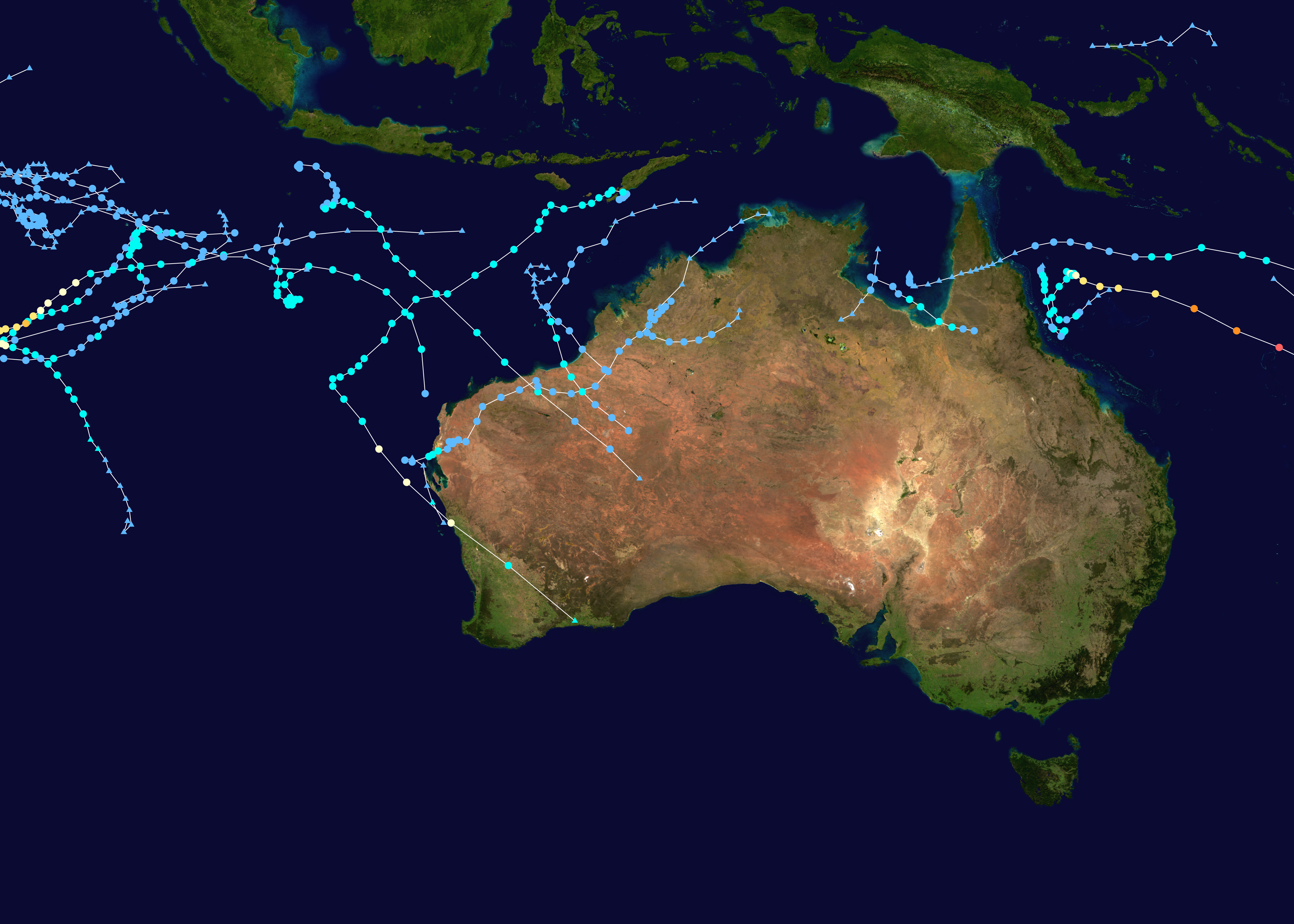
- Season summary map

Seasonal boundaries
- First system formed: 24 November 2020
- Last system dissipated: 12 April 2021

Strongest storm
- Name: Niran
  - Maximum winds: 205 km/h (125 mph) (10-minute sustained)
  - Lowest pressure: 931 hPa (mbar)

Seasonal statistics
- Tropical lows: 19
- Tropical cyclones: 8
- Severe tropical cyclones: 3
- Total fatalities: 272 total (Second-deadliest Australian region cyclone season on record)
- Total damage: $701 million (2020 USD)

Related articles
- 2020–21 South-West Indian Ocean cyclone season; 2020–21 South Pacific cyclone season

The 2020–21 Australian region cyclone season was a below average but very deadly season when most tropical cyclones formed in the Southern Indian Ocean and Pacific Oceans between 90°E and 160°E. It produced 8 tropical cyclones with 3 strengthening into severe tropical cyclones. However, it featured the region's third-deadliest cyclone on record—Cyclone Seroja, which brought severe floods and landslides to southern Indonesia and East Timor. The season officially began on 1 November 2020 and started with the formation of Tropical Low 01U on 24 November within the basin, which would later become Tropical Storm Bongoyo in the South-West Indian Ocean, and ended with the dissipation of a tropical low on 24 April, 6 days before the season ended on 30 April. However, a tropical cyclone could form at any time between 1 July 2020 and 30 June 2021 and would count towards the season total. During the season, tropical cyclones were officially monitored by one of the three tropical cyclone warning centres (TCWCs) for the region which are operated by the Australian Bureau of Meteorology, National Weather Service of Papua New Guinea and the Indonesian Agency for Meteorology, Climatology and Geophysics. The United States Joint Typhoon Warning Center (JTWC) and other national meteorological services including Météo-France also monitored the basin during the season.

== Season forecasts ==
In October 2020, Australia's Bureau of Meteorology (BOM) issued its tropical cyclone outlook for the 2020–21 season, and in the same month, the agency contributed towards the Southwest Pacific Tropical Cyclone Outlook, along with New Zealand's MetService, NIWA and the Fiji Meteorological Service (FMS). Each of the outlooks accounted for analogue seasons and the effects of various climate drivers, which included the state of the El Niño Southern Oscillation (ENSO). Below average sea surface temperatures in the eastern tropical Pacific Ocean and atmospheric conditions indicated a La Niña pattern, and it was declared that a La Niña had emerged on 29 September 2020. The BOM predicted that the La Niña pattern will persist into early 2021, and waters north of Australia and the Southwestern Pacific Ocean will be warmer than average in the coming three months. The bureau also advised that cyclone kits include a supply of face masks and hand sanitisers, owing to the concurrent COVID-19 pandemic.

The BOM expected an average to slightly above average number of tropical cyclones for the season. The agency predicted a 66% chance of above average activity for the region as a whole, compared with the average of 11 tropical cyclones. They also predicted that the Western and Northwestern sub-regions both had a 63% chance of experiencing more tropical cyclones than usual, the Northern region had a 57% chance of above average activity, and the Eastern region had a 67% chance of more tropical cyclones than the average. The Northwestern sub-region had a probability of two tropical cyclones crossing the Western Australian coast, with a significant risk of at least one of these to be a severe tropical cyclone.

The Southwest Pacific Tropical Cyclone Outlook covered a portion of the Australian region that comprised waters surrounding Papua New Guinea, the Solomon Islands, the Coral Sea, and the northern Tasman Sea including Norfolk Island. The outlook called for a reduced level of tropical cyclone activity in the early season, from November to January, but an increased level of activity in the late season, from February to April. Near normal activity during the season was expected for Papua New Guinea and the Solomon Islands, while an elevated level of activity was expected in the Coral Sea and the northern Tasman Sea, especially during the late season.

== Systems ==
=== Tropical Low 01U (Bongoyo) ===
- Tropical low (Australian scale)
- Tropical depression (SSHWS)
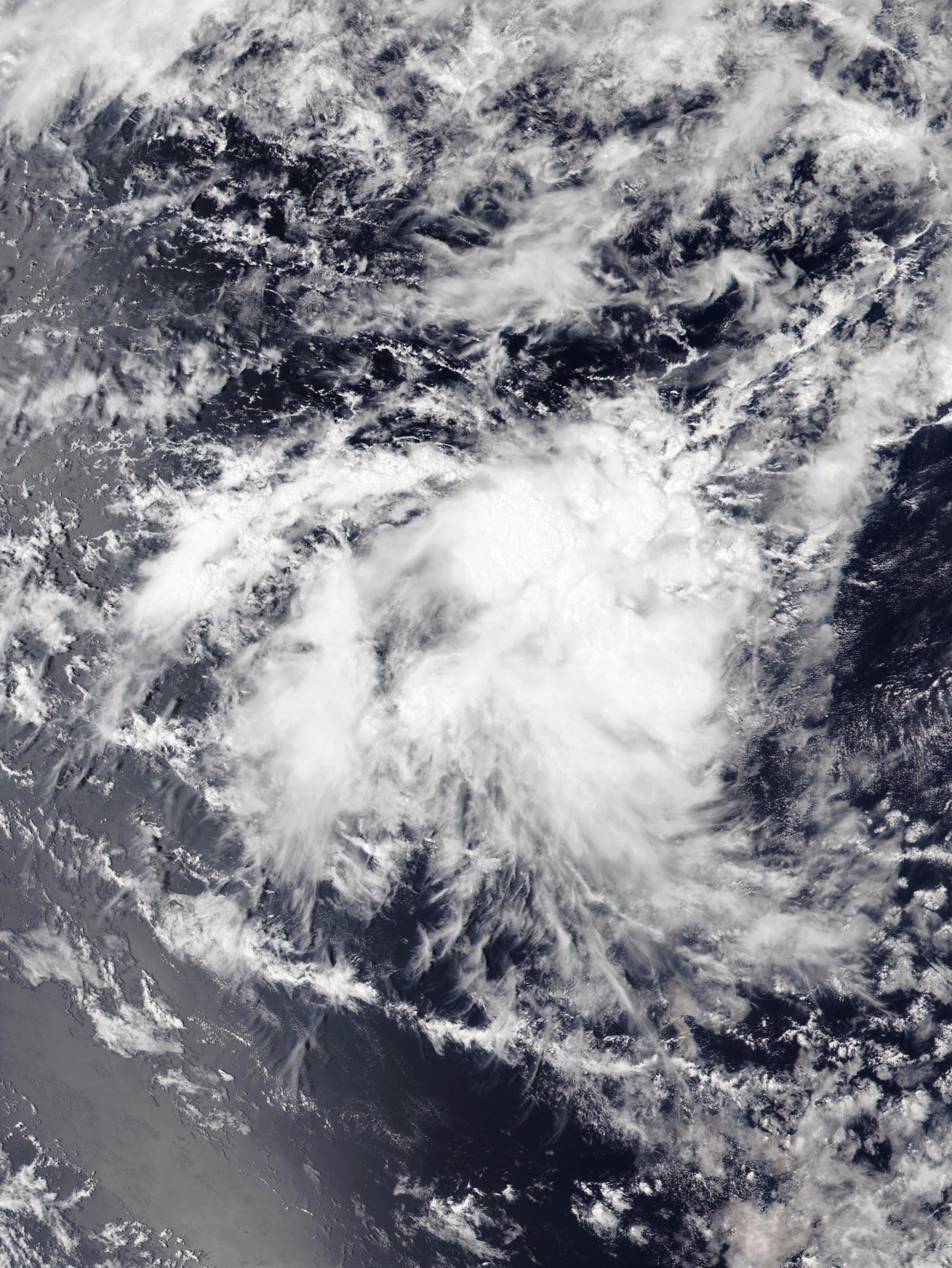
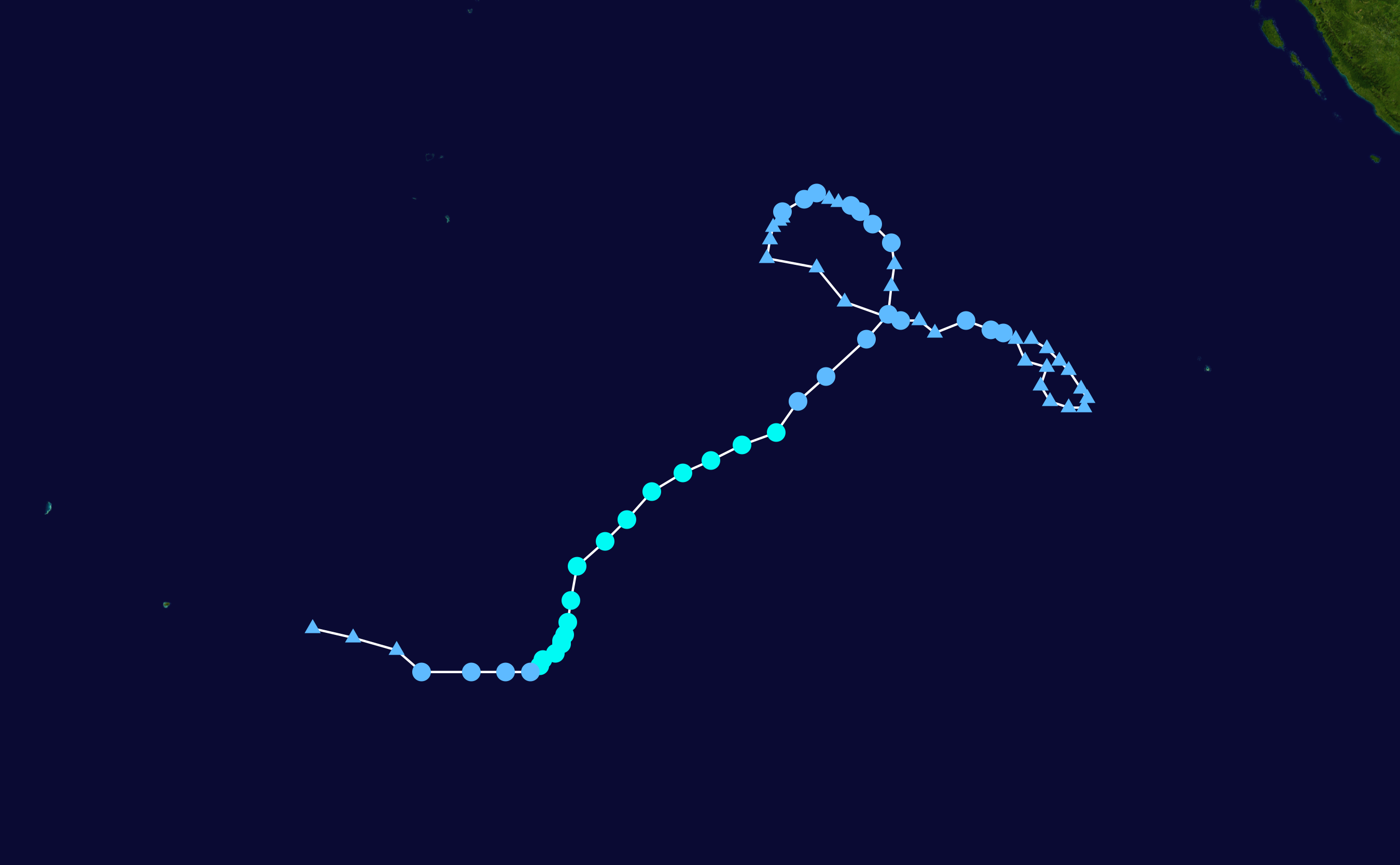
- Duration: 24 November – 30 November (Exited basin)
- Peak intensity: 45 km/h (30 mph) (10-min); 1005 hPa (mbar)

During mid to late November 2020, a moderate strength pulse of the Madden–Julian Oscillation (MJO) tracked eastwards across the equatorial Indian Ocean towards the Maritime Continent and Australian longitudes. The presence of the MJO brought an increase in tropical moisture to the atmospheric environment, as well as aiding the formation of Tropical Cyclone Alicia in the South-West Indian Ocean region in mid November. On 24 November, the Bureau of Meteorology (BOM) reported that a tropical low had developed within a trough in the far northwestern corner of the Australian region, located approximately 860 km (530 mi) northwest of the Cocos Islands. The system was assigned the identifier code 01U by the BOM. The Joint Typhoon Warning Center (JTWC) assessed environmental conditions as being only marginally conducive for tropical cyclogenesis, with good poleward outflow and sea surface temperatures near 30 °C (86 °F) being offset by the effects of moderate vertical wind shear. Consequently, the tropical low was expected to have only a low chance of developing into a tropical cyclone prior to moving westwards out of the Australian region later in the week.

Deep convection persisted over the system as the tropical low tracked gradually southwards over the following days, and by early 27 November, a curved convective rainband had developed on the eastern side. Despite this, the system remained mostly disorganised in the marginal environment, with an elongated low-level circulation centre. On 29 November, the tropical low began to be steered slowly towards the west-northwest on the northern side of the subtropical high pressure belt. The system encountered somewhat weaker wind shear along its new track, allowing deep convection to develop closer to the low-level circulation centre. Before any significant intensification could occur, however, the tropical low exited the Australian region on 30 November, passing into the area of responsibility of Météo-France's tropical cyclone warning centre in Réunion. The system later intensified into Severe Tropical Storm Bongoyo in the South-West Indian Ocean cyclone region on 7 December. At its peak intensity in the Australian region, the BOM estimated the system's minimum atmospheric pressure as 1005 hPa (29.68 inHg) on 25 November. Satellite scatterometer data revealed maximum sustained winds of approximately 45 km/h (30 mph) at 02:30 UTC on 30 November, a few hours prior to the system exiting the Australian region.

Tropical Low 01U made its closest approach to the Cocos Islands on 27–28 November, passing a little more than 500 km (310 mi) to the west. Increased winds, as well as occasional showers and thunderstorms, occurred across the islands while the system was located nearby. Maximum 10-minute sustained winds of 39 km/h (24 mph) with gusts to 46 km/h (29 mph) were observed at the airport on West Island at 04:30 UTC on 27 November. A total of 23.6 mm (0.93 in) of rainfall was also recorded on 24–28 November.

=== Tropical Low 02U ===
- Tropical low (Australian scale)
- Tropical storm (SSHWS)
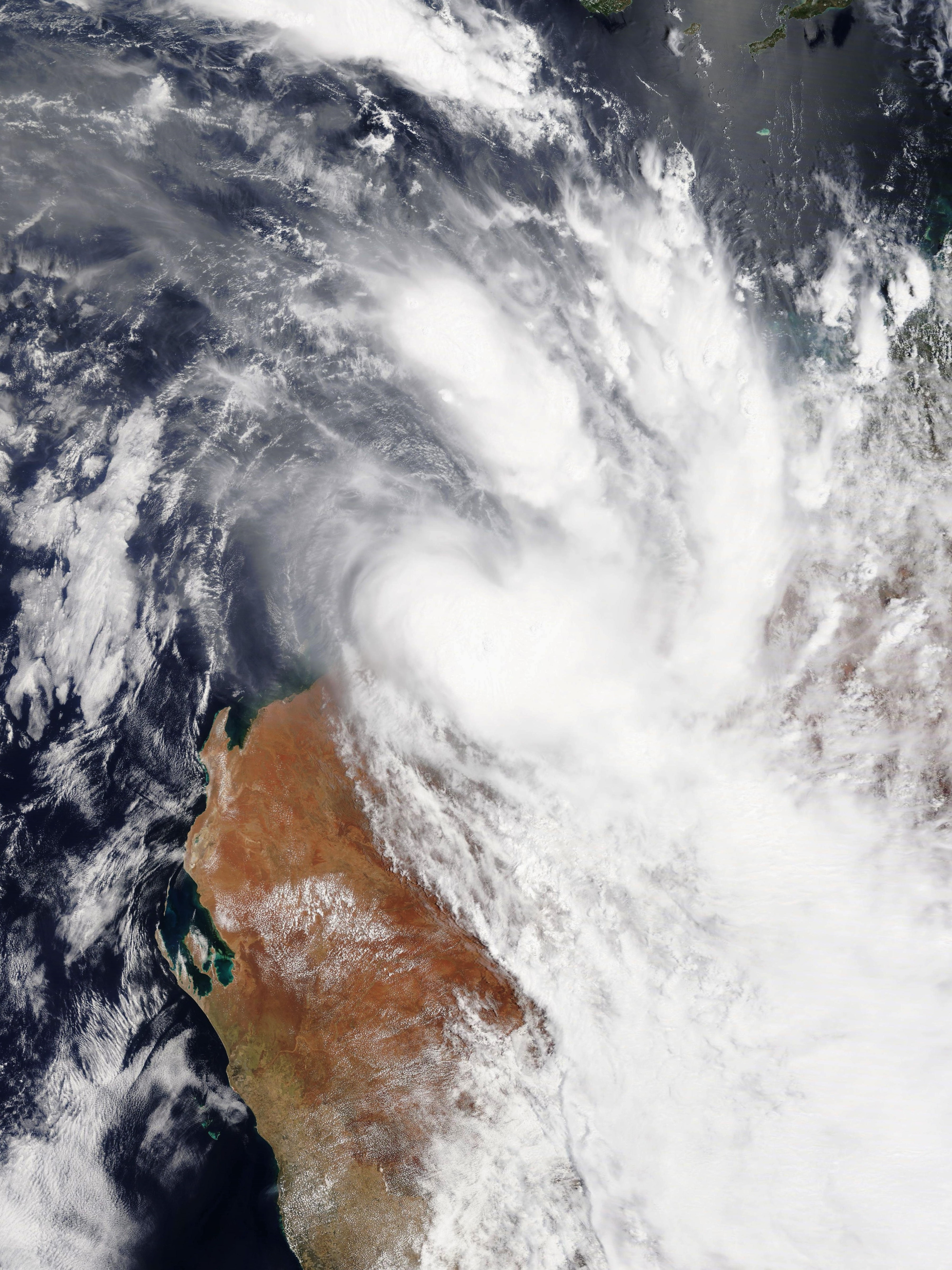
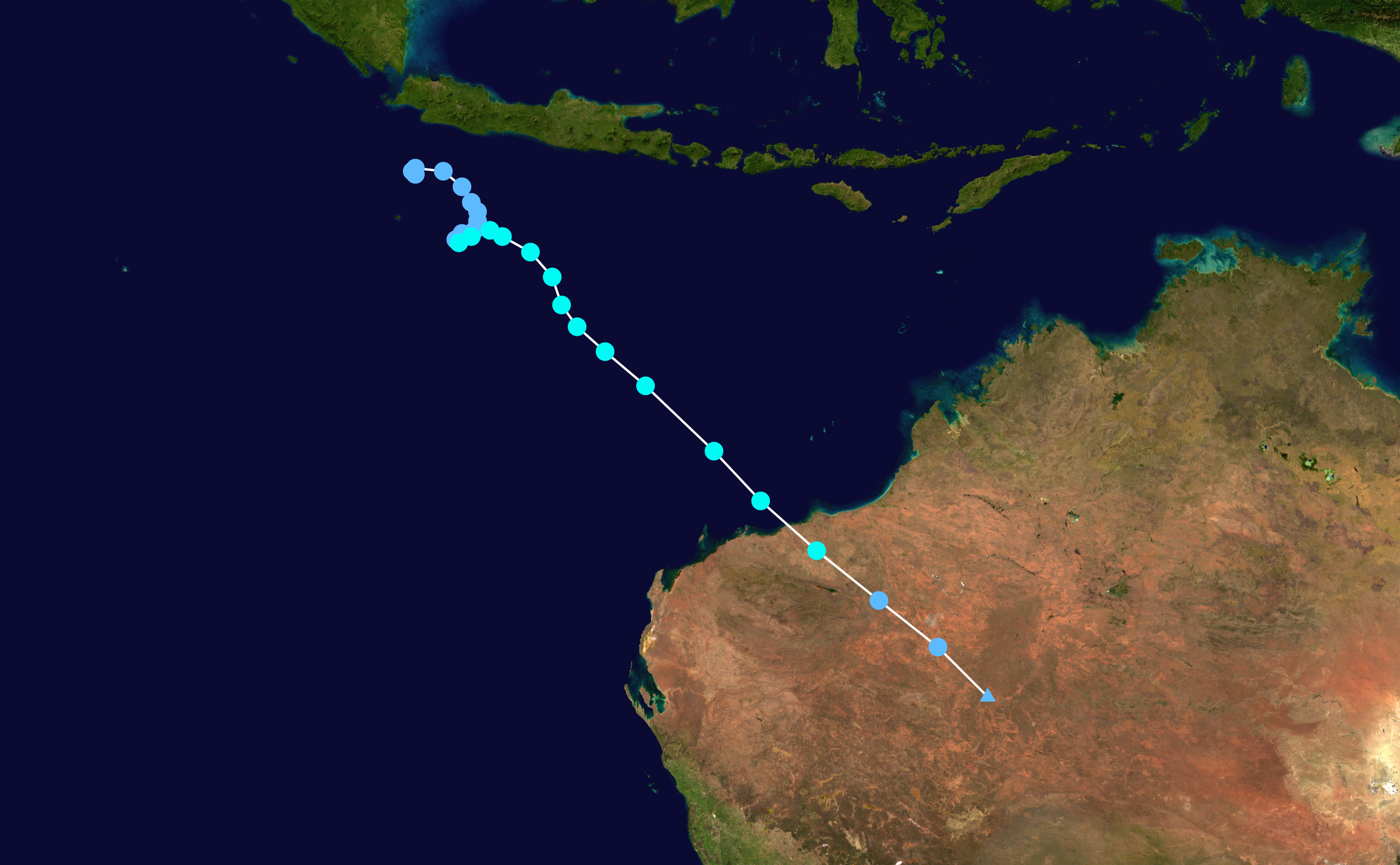
- Duration: 6 December – 12 December
- Peak intensity: 75 km/h (45 mph) (10-min); 991 hPa (mbar)

On 6 December, the Bureau of Meteorology (BOM) reported that a tropical low had developed within a monsoon trough near the western end of Java, approximately 200 km (120 mi) north-northeast of Christmas Island. The system was assigned the official identifier code 02U upon formation. Initially located in an unfavourable environment for intensification, the tropical low began to encounter somewhat improved conditions as it tracked towards the southeast. On 7 December, warm sea surface temperatures and strong diffluence in the upper troposphere fuelled the development of deep convection around the system's low-level circulation centre. Referencing the tropical low's quickly improving structure and the presence of a weak eye feature in microwave satellite imagery, the Joint Typhoon Warning Center (JTWC) issued a Tropical Cyclone Formation Alert for the system at 05:30 UTC. After tracking in a clockwise path around the northeastern side of Christmas Island, Tropical Low 02U became quasi-stationary on 8 December. Deep convection continued to develop near the centre during the overnight period, and as the low began to track eastwards, the JTWC upgraded the system to a tropical storm on the Saffir–Simpson hurricane wind scale at 18:00 UTC on 8 December.

Tropical Low 02U soon assumed a southeastward course, steered by the influence of a subtropical ridge situated to the east. Environmental conditions remained only marginally favourable for development, however, and the system's deep convection became displaced to the southwest of the centre due to northeasterly vertical wind shear, leaving the low-level circulation centre fully exposed. During this period, the JTWC reported that the tropical low's one-minute sustained winds had decreased to approximately 65 km/h (40 mph), from the earlier peak of 85 km/h (55 mph). By 12:00 UTC on 10 December, the system had begun to accelerate towards the southeast, moving into an environment more favourable for intensification. The interaction with an upper-level trough enhanced the tropical low's poleward outflow channel, allowing deep convection to rebuild over the centre of the system. This enabled the system to strengthen as it rapidly approached the coast of Western Australia at a speed of approximately 40 km/h (25 mph), although vertical wind shear once again began to increase.

Tropical Low 02U made landfall between Port Hedland and Whim Creek on the Pilbara coastline just after 03:00 UTC on 11 December. About three hours prior to landfall, the JTWC reported that maximum one-minute sustained winds had increased to 75 km/h (45 mph). Sustained gale-force winds were observed at Bedout Island and Port Hedland around the time of landfall, peaking at 70 km/h (45 mph) at both locations. Ten-minute sustained winds also reached 63 km/h (39 mph) on Legendre Island at 00:00 UTC. Despite these wind readings, the BOM did not classify the low as a Category 1 tropical cyclone because they determined that gale-force winds did not extend more than halfway around the centre. They attributed the strong winds on the eastern side of the system to a combination of enhanced northwesterly monsoonal flow and the system's fast translational velocity, rather than the low having intensified into a tropical cyclone. The tropical low continued rapidly inland across Western Australia over the next day, accelerating to about 50 km/h (30 mph) soon after landfall. Despite tracking over land, the BOM indicated that sustained winds to gale force, accompanied by gusts of up to 100 km/h (60 mph), could still occur near the centre of the system, particularly on the eastern side. The weakening tropical low was last mentioned by the BOM at around 08:00 UTC on 12 December, while located in the southeastern corner of Western Australia.

=== Tropical Low ===
- Tropical low (Australian scale)
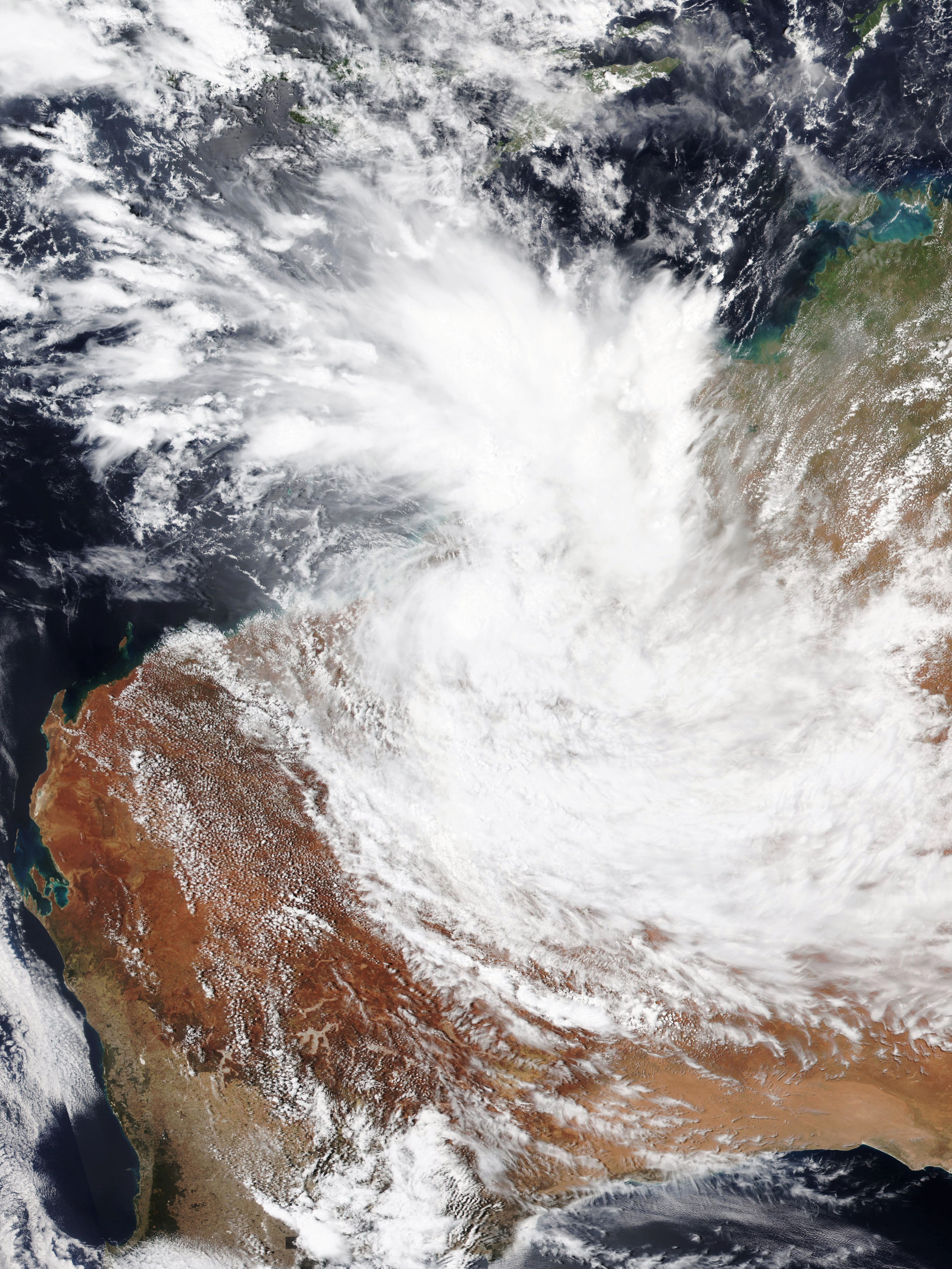
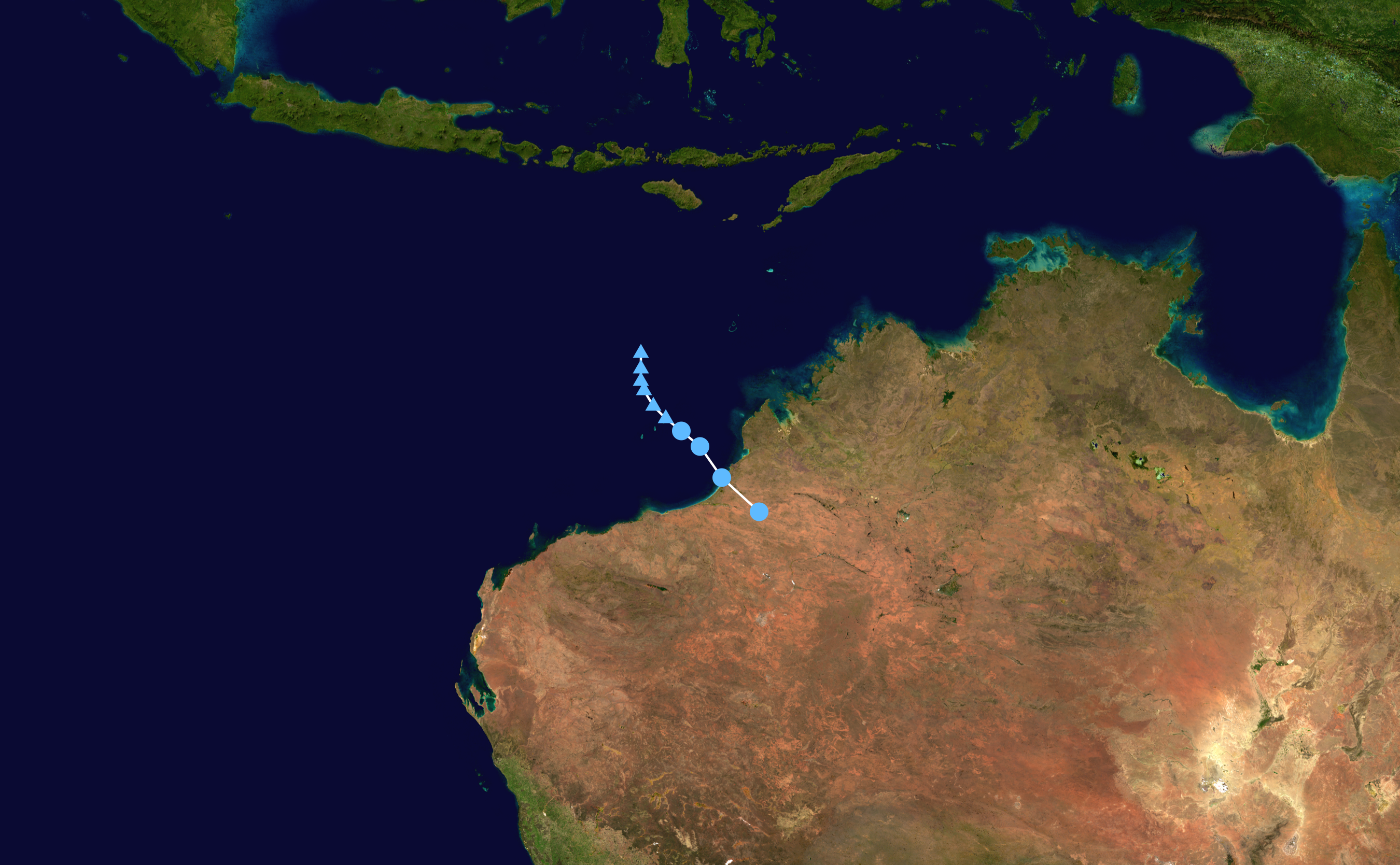
- Duration: 7 December – 11 December
- Peak intensity: 55 km/h (35 mph) (10-min); 997 hPa (mbar)

The presence of the Madden–Julian Oscillation and an equatorial Rossby wave in the Australian region contributed to the formation of another broad low-pressure system in the monsoon trough over the far eastern Indian Ocean during early December. Initially lacking organised deep convection, the system proceeded to track in a generally southwards direction towards the Kimberley region of Western Australia. By late on 7 December, infrared satellite imagery indicated an improvement in the structure of the low, with the system displaying an increase in flaring deep convection, accompanied by rotation evident in the lower troposphere. Owing to the increase in organisation, the Bureau of Meteorology (BOM) classified the system as a tropical low by 21:00 UTC, when it was located approximately 330 km (210 mi) northwest of Broome. Environmental conditions around the system were conducive for tropical cyclogenesis, with low vertical wind shear, good upper-level outflow and sea surface temperatures near 30 °C (86 °F). Due to the system's proximity to the coast, however, both the BOM and the Joint Typhoon Warning Center (JTWC) forecast only a low chance of development into a tropical cyclone before making landfall.

As the tropical low tracked southeastwards towards the coast, environmental conditions continued to improve, with sea surface temperatures nearing 31 °C (88 °F) and the system maintaining a robust poleward outflow channel in the upper troposphere. As the system strengthened in the moderately favourable environment, the BOM estimated the minimum atmospheric pressure at the centre of the low to be 997 hPa (29.44 inHg) at 18:00 UTC on 8 December. The JTWC issued a Tropical Cyclone Formation Alert for the tropical low at 21:30 UTC, noting the presence of convective rainbands wrapping into the system, as well as persistent deep convection over the low-level circulation centre. By this time, however, the system was quickly approaching the Australian coast, so the time available for further intensification was very limited. The tropical low made landfall on the Kimberley coast between Bidyadanga and the Anna Plains cattle station just after 00:00 UTC on 9 December. The system moved inland over the following days, tracking in a generally south-southeasterly direction. The system was last mentioned as a tropical low by the BOM on 11 December while located in central Western Australia.

The tropical low and associated thunderstorms generated strong winds in coastal and inland areas of the Kimberley and Pilbara regions as it tracked through the area, including sustained winds near gale force at several offshore sites. 10-minute sustained winds of at least 50 km/h (30 mph) persisted for approximately four hours on Adele Island late on 8 December (UTC), peaking at 56 km/h (35 mph) at 21:00 UTC, with a 76 km/h (47 mph) gust observed shortly thereafter. Sustained winds also reached 56 km/h (35 mph) at Bedout Island on 8 December, with a peak gust of 67 km/h (42 mph), and Rowley Shoals recorded maximum sustained winds of 52 km/h (32 mph) and gusts to 65 km/h (40 mph). Maximum wind gust speeds recorded on the mainland included 67 km/h (42 mph) at Port Hedland; 65 km/h (40 mph) in Warburton; 63 km/h (39 mph) at Lombadina; 61 km/h (38 mph) at Giles and Telfer, 59 km/h (37 mph) at Christmas Creek; 56 km/h (35 mph) at Broome, Curtin, Derby and Barimunya, 54 km/h (34 mph) at Karratha and Marble Bar; 52 km/h (32 mph) at Roebourne; and 50 km/h (30 mph) at Mandora.

As the sprawling tropical low tracked inland, flood watches and warnings were issued for large swathes of the deserts of western central Australia, incorporating parts of Western Australia, the Northern Territory and South Australia.

=== Tropical Low 03U ===
- Tropical low (Australian scale)
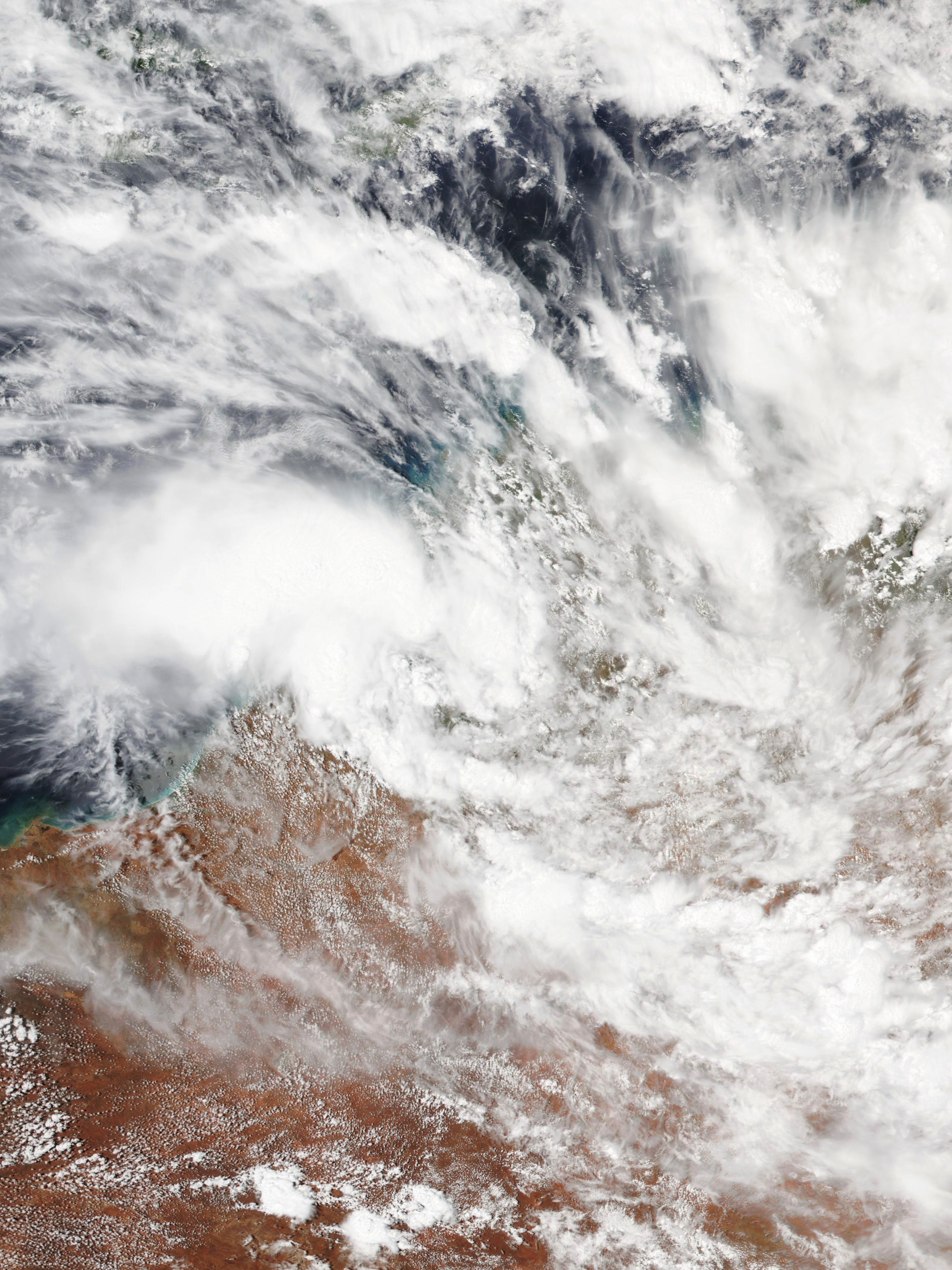
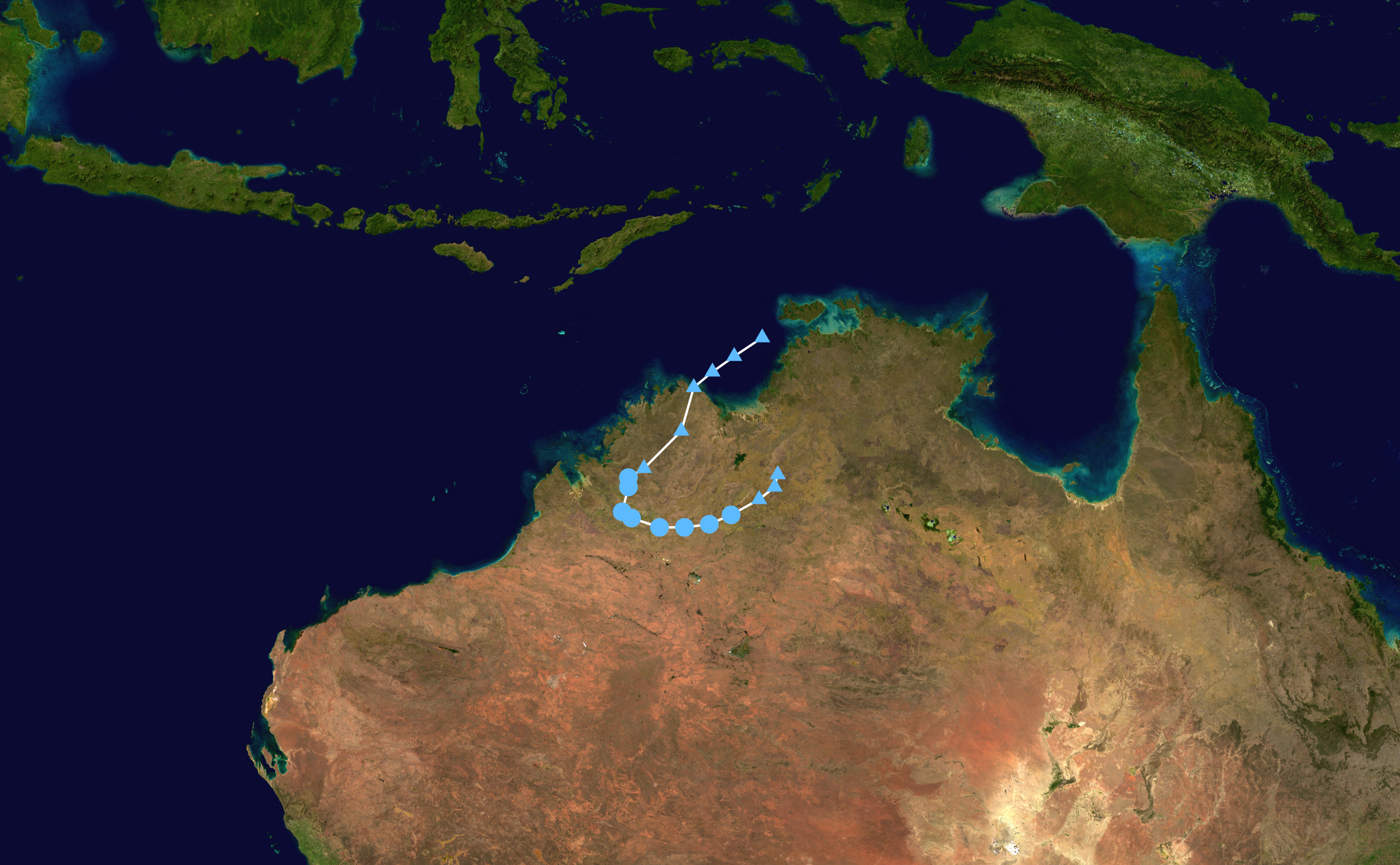
- Duration: 18 December – 23 December
- Peak intensity: 55 km/h (35 mph) (10-min); 993 hPa (mbar)

During mid December, favourable conditions from a pulse of the Madden–Julian Oscillation (MJO) located over the eastern Maritime Continent contributed to the re-formation of the monsoon trough over northern Australia. The combined influence of the MJO and the monsoonal conditions generated widespread cloudiness and rainfall across the Australian tropics, leading to an increased likelihood of tropical cyclone formation in the region. On 17 December, a low-pressure system developed within the monsoon trough, near the northern coast of the Top End, and began to move westwards. The Bureau of Meteorology (BOM) classified the system as a tropical low by 06:00 UTC the following day while it was located near the Tiwi Islands, and assigned the identifier code 03U. The system soon assumed a southwestward track towards the Kimberley region. Environmental conditions were favourable for tropical cyclogenesis, with low to moderate vertical wind shear, good upper-level outflow and very warm sea surface temperatures nearing 31 °C (88 °F). Despite this, the tropical low's close proximity to land hindered intensification, and only limited development occurred before the system made landfall on 19 December near the Cambridge Gulf, between Wyndham and Kalumburu. Around this time, the BOM estimated the tropical low's central atmospheric pressure to be 995 hPa (29.38 inHg).

The system continued towards the southwest over the ensuing hours, paralleling the coast of Western Australia. Despite tracking over land, the tropical low showed signs of organisation, with the generally favourable atmospheric conditions allowing the development of formative convective banding in the system's southern semicircle. After reaching the Dampier Peninsula on 20 December, the system turned sharply to the east and began tracking further inland. By the following day, the tropical low became slow-moving over the southeastern Kimberley region, during which time a minimum atmospheric pressure of 992.5 hPa (29.31 inHg) was recorded at Halls Creek. During the next couple of days, the system continued moving eastward, before dissipating on 23 December.

Tropical Low 03U generated strong winds in the Kimberley region and on nearby islands for several days while located nearby. Maximum 10-minute sustained winds of 57 km/h (35 mph) with a gust to 72 km/h (45 mph) were observed on Browse Island, and Adele Island recorded sustained winds of 54 km/h (34 mph) with a gust to 69 km/h (43 mph). Troughton Island also experienced a gust of 95 km/h (60 mph) during a thunderstorm on 21 December.

=== Tropical Low 04U ===
- Tropical low (Australian scale)
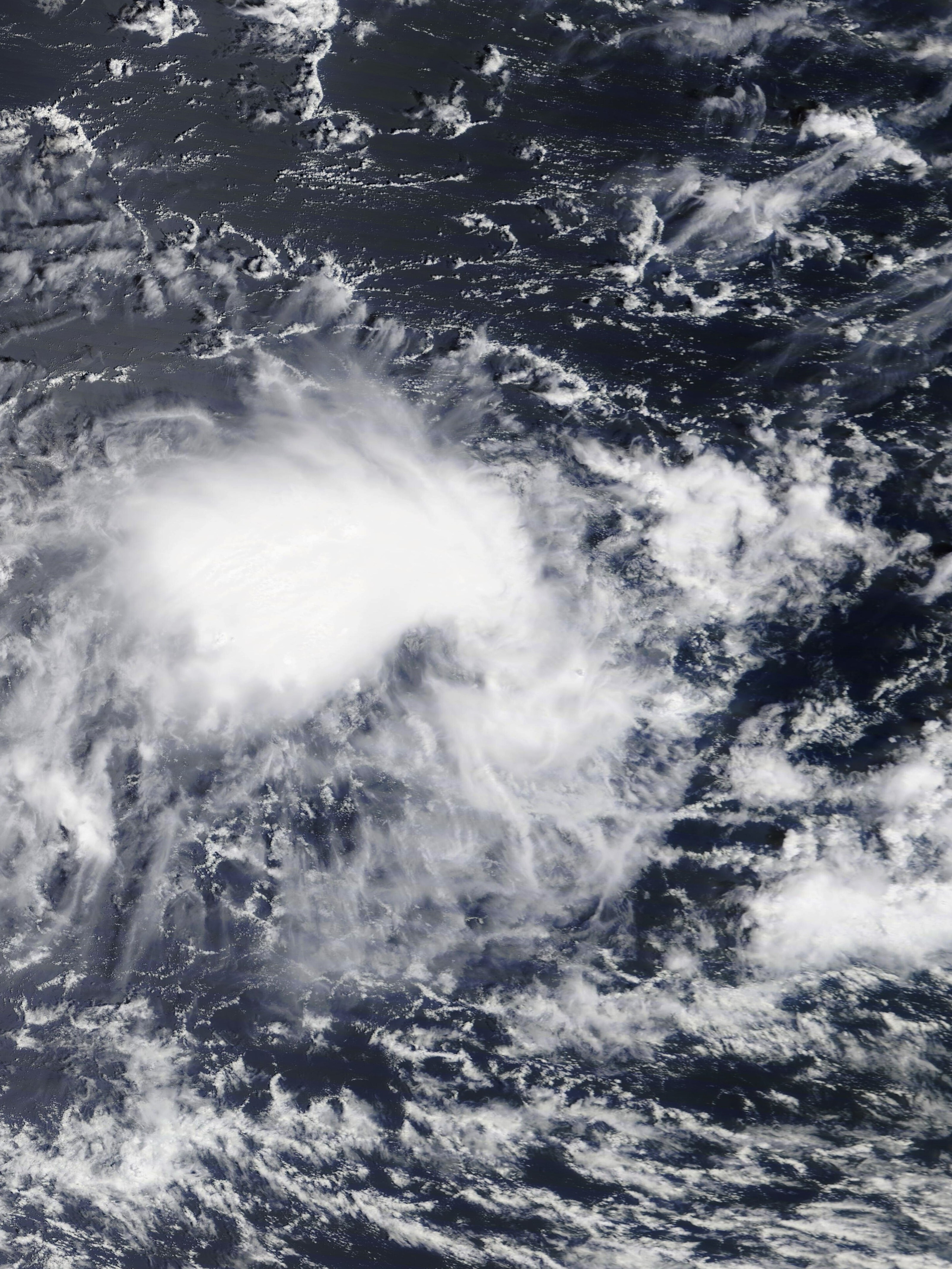
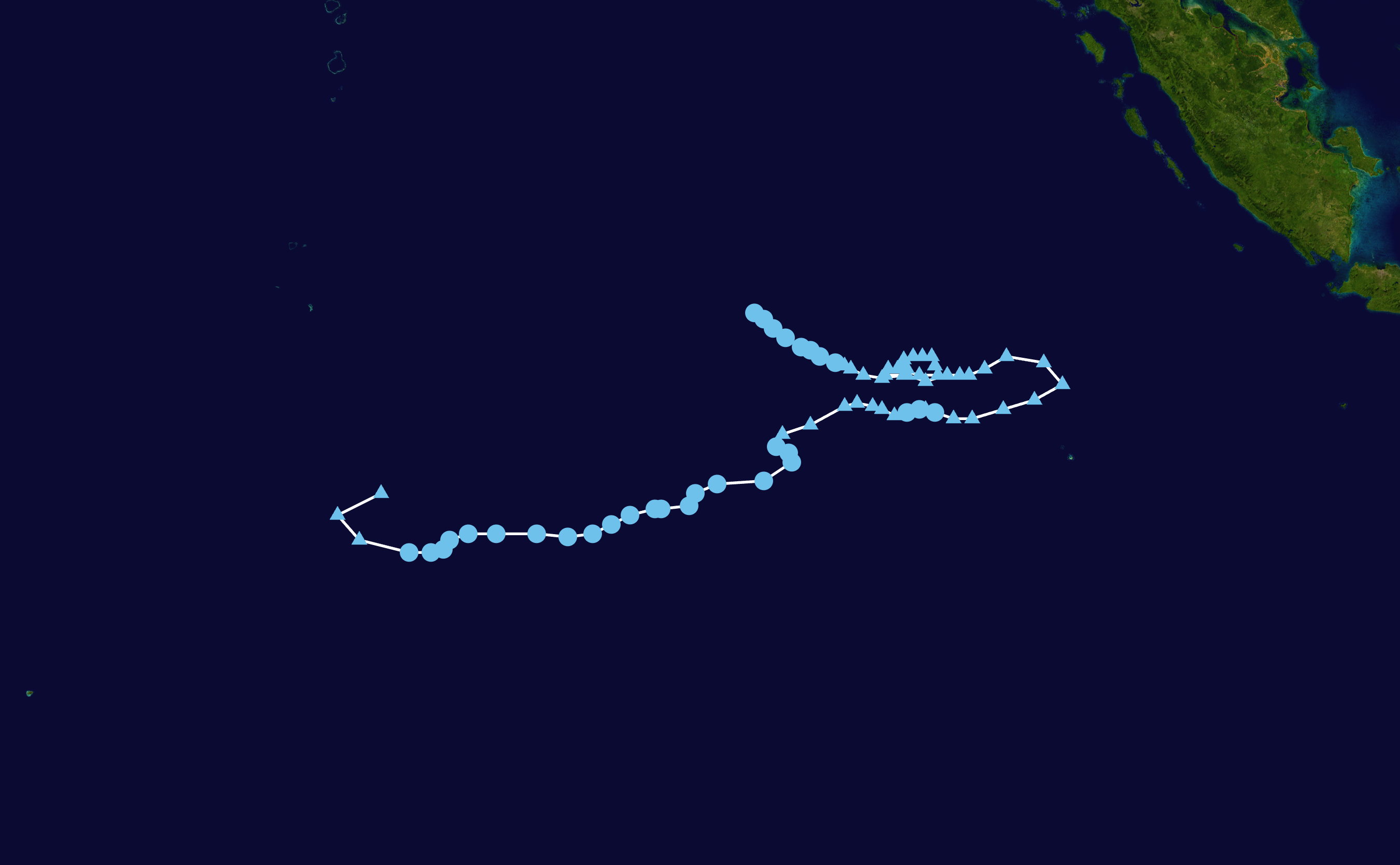
- Duration: 20 December (Entered basin) – 28 December (Exited basin)
- Peak intensity: 35 km/h (25 mph) (10-min); 1003 hPa (mbar)

On 20 December, a tropical disturbance that was being monitored by Météo-France's tropical cyclone warning centre in Réunion crossed into the Australian region from the South-West Indian Ocean basin. Upon entering the region, the system was classified as a tropical low by the Bureau of Meteorology (BOM), and had an estimated central atmospheric pressure of 1006 hPa (29.71 inHg). Initially situated approximately 825 km (513 mi) west-northwest of the Cocos Islands, the system was located in an environment that was generally unfavourable for intensification, with moderate to strong vertical wind shear offsetting otherwise conducive upper-level outflow and warm sea surface temperatures of 28–29 °C (82–84 °F). It again exited the basin on 28 December without any significant intensification where RSMC Réunion reclassified the system as Tropical Depression 05.

=== Tropical Cyclone Imogen ===
- Category 2 tropical cyclone (Australian scale)
- Tropical storm (SSHWS)
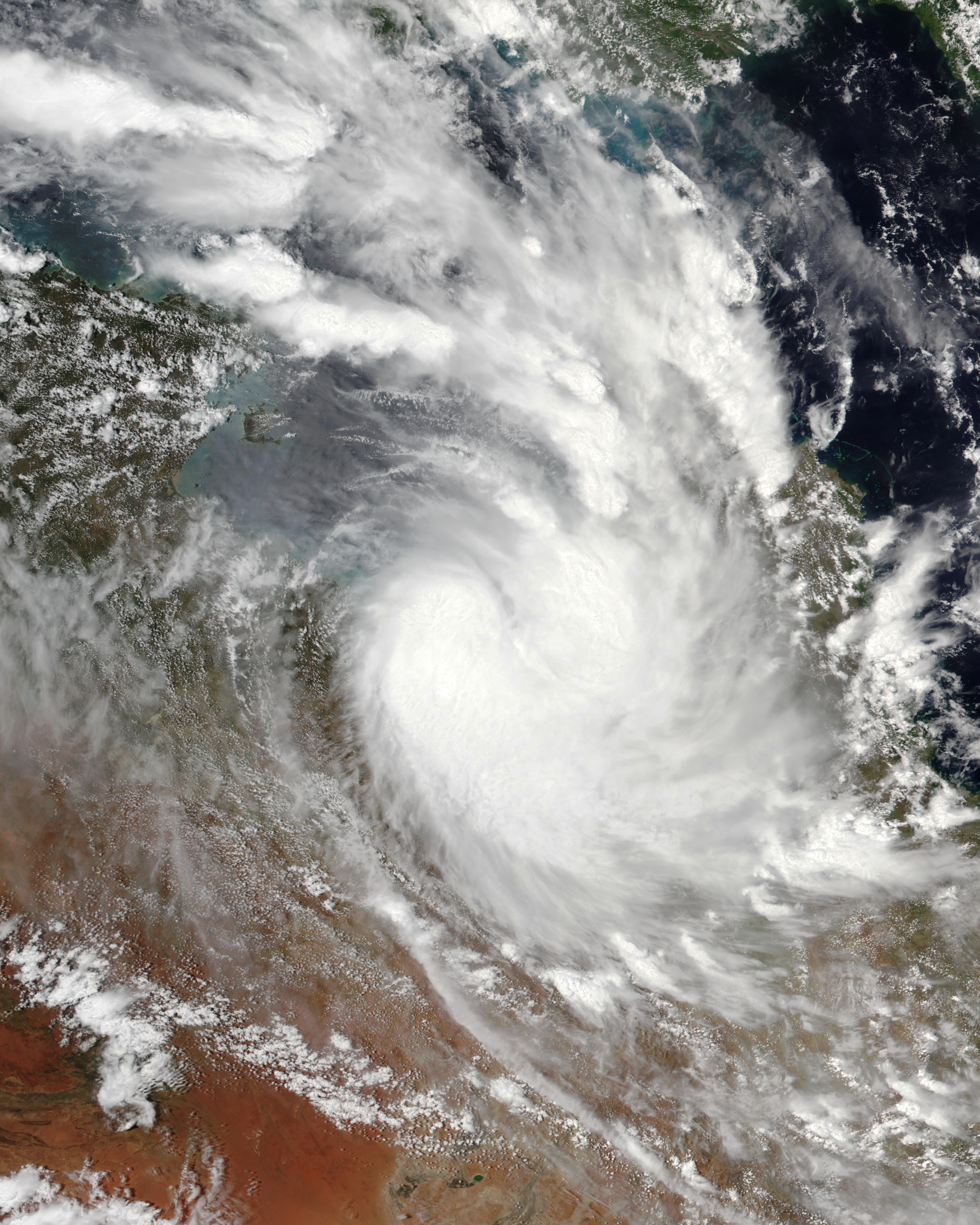
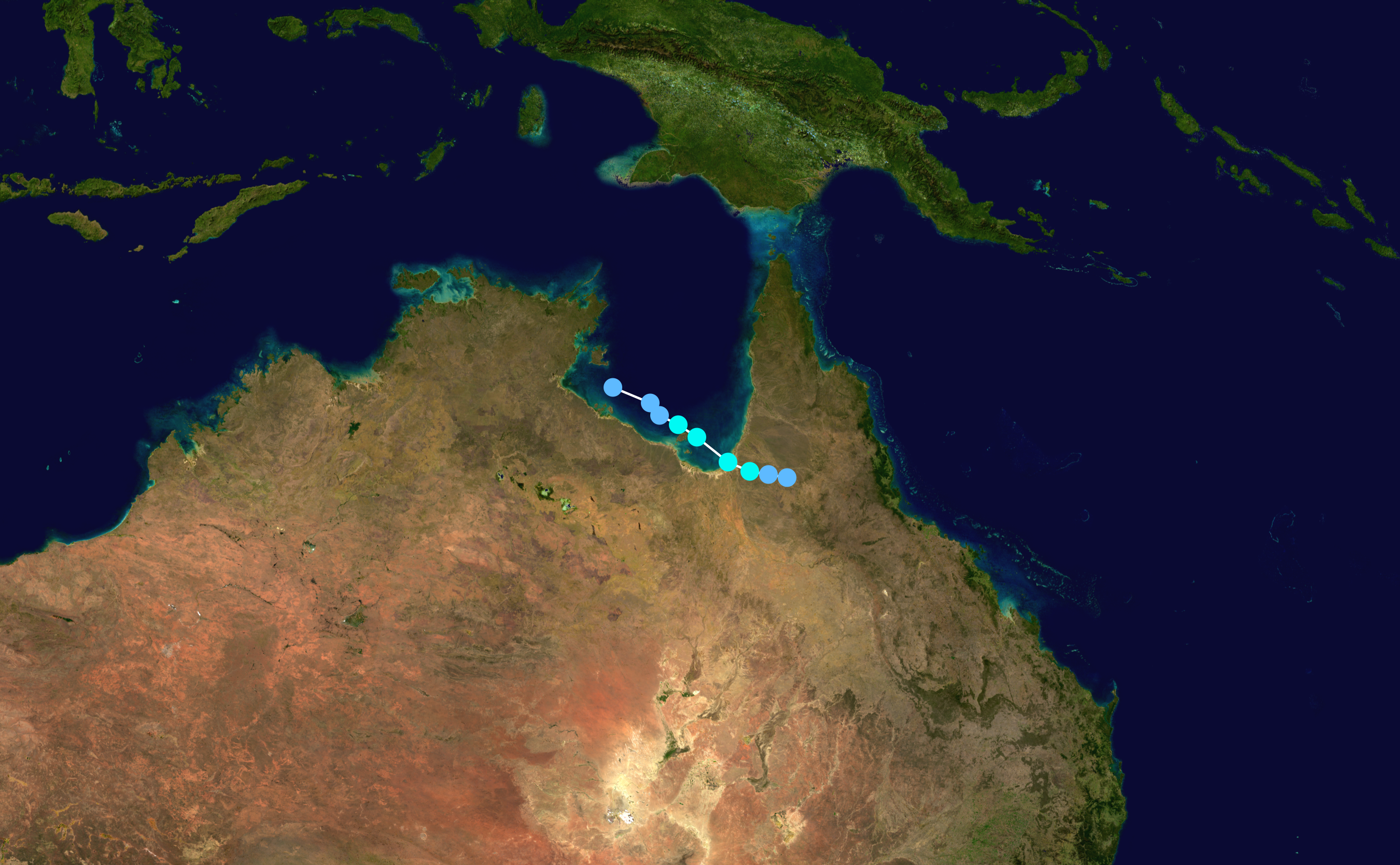
- Duration: 1 January – 6 January
- Peak intensity: 95 km/h (60 mph) (10-min); 985 hPa (mbar)

On 1 January, the Bureau of Meteorology (BOM) reported that a tropical low had formed near Groote Eylandt in the western Gulf of Carpentaria, located about 635 km (395 mi) east-southeast of Darwin. The system was assigned the identifier code 05U by the BOM. Environmental conditions were assessed as being favourable for tropical cyclogenesis, characterised by very warm sea surface temperatures of up to 31 °C (88 °F), low to moderate vertical wind shear and an established poleward outflow channels in the upper levels. Flaring convection began to develop around the consolidating low-level circulation centre as the system tracked southeastward over the Gulf of Carpentaria, and at 00:00 UTC on 2 January, the BOM issued a tropical cyclone watch for parts of the northwestern Queensland coast. The tropical low continued to strengthen as convective rainbands began to wrap into the system's centre, with moist northwesterly cross-equatorial flow from over Indonesia feeding the system in the low to mid troposphere. By 18:00 UTC, vertical wind shear values had decreased further as the tropical low moved underneath an upper-level ridge; however, despite the highly favourable environmental conditions, intensification was limited somewhat by the broad and elongated nature of the low-level circulation center. The Joint Typhoon Warning Center (JTWC) issued a Tropical Cyclone Formation Alert for the system at 20:00 UTC.

Tropical Low 05U made landfall on the western coast of Mornington Island at around 02:00 UTC on 3 January, with maximum sustained winds near the centre of 55 km/h (35 mph). Intensification proceeded as the system re-emerged over the Gulf of Carpentaria a few hours later, with spiral rainbands continuing to develop around the centre of the system and deep convection becoming more concentrated. At 06:00 UTC, the tropical low was upgraded to a Category 1 tropical cyclone by the BOM, and was named Imogen, becoming the first tropical cyclone of the 2020–21 season. At the same time, the JTWC indicated that maximum one-minute sustained winds had increased to 65 km/h (40 mph), making Imogen equivalent to a tropical storm on the Saffir–Simpson hurricane wind scale. In combination with the low-level northwesterly flow, an upper-tropospheric trough situated to the south of the system began to gradually accelerate Imogen towards the southeast. Deep convection continued to concentrate over the centre of the cyclone; however, due to the system's proximity to land, limited time was available for further intensification. Tropical Cyclone Imogen made landfall just to the north of Karumba, Queensland, at 11:00 UTC on 3 January. At the time of landfall, maximum 10-minute sustained winds were estimated at 65 km/h (40 mph), with gusts to 100 km/h (60 mph) and a minimum atmospheric pressure of 994 hPa (29.35 inHg). The JTWC reported that maximum one-minute sustained winds had reached 85 km/h (55 mph) by this time.

Despite the centre of the system tracking over land, Imogen maintained its organisation for several hours, assisted by the flat terrain that had been saturated by heavy rainfall generated by the cyclone itself. The BOM reported that maximum 10-minute sustained winds peaked at 85 km/h (55 mph), with gusts to 110 km/h (70 mph), at 15:00 UTC on 3 January—about four hours after landfall—as the cyclone was passing to the northeast of Normanton. At this time, the automatic weather station at the town's airport recorded a minimum atmospheric pressure of 989.3 hPa (0.08859 inHg). The system weakened to a tropical low, before it was last noted to the north-northwest of Townsville.

=== Tropical Low 06U ===
- Tropical low (Australian scale)
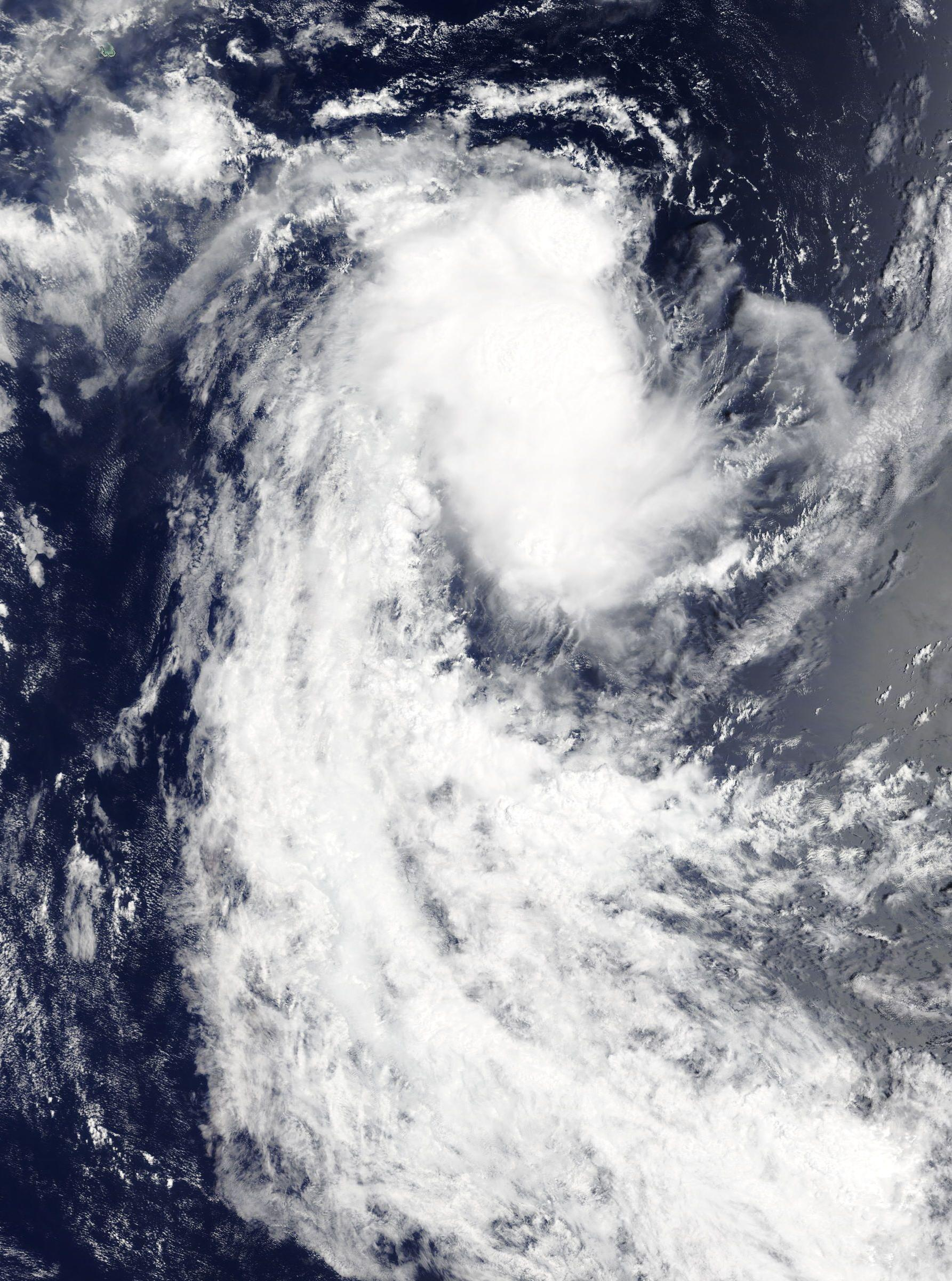
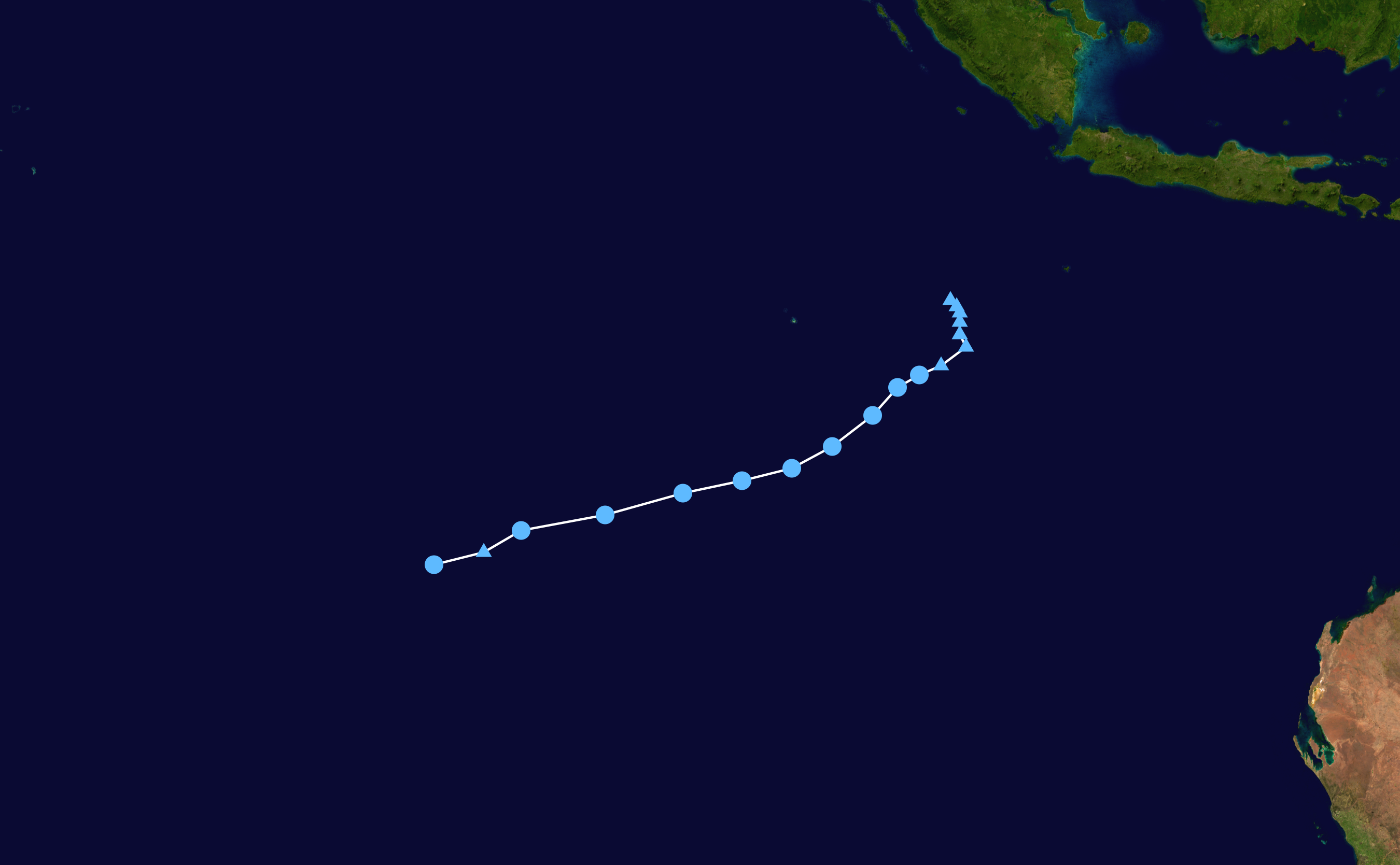
- Duration: 5 January – 10 January
- Peak intensity: 65 km/h (40 mph) (10-min); 999 hPa (mbar)

On 5 January, the Bureau of Meteorology (BOM) reported that a weak tropical low had formed within a trough over the eastern Indian Ocean, centred approximately 500 km (310 mi) northeast of the Cocos Islands. Environmental conditions were assessed by the BOM as being unfavourable for significant intensification of the low, citing in particular the strong easterly winds in the upper troposphere that were forecast to develop by 10 January. The tropical low meandered gradually southwards over the following days, passing well to the east of the Cocos Islands on 8–9 January, around which time the system began to accelerate towards the west-southwest. On 9 January, the Joint Typhoon Warning Center (JTWC) reported the development of formative convective rainbands wrapping into the tropical low's centre, and determined that environmental conditions were favourable for the system to strengthen, in contrast with the BOM's assessment. The JTWC noted the presence of strong poleward upper-level outflow, low vertical wind shear values and warm sea surface temperatures of 29–30 °C (84–86 °F). By 05:00 UTC on 10 January, gale-force winds had developed in the southern quadrants of the tropical low, in part due to the fast translational velocity of the system towards the west-southwest. The system's minimum atmospheric pressure was estimated at 1002 hPa (29.59 inHg) at that time. Then, the system exited the basin towards the Southwest Indian Ocean on 10 January, before dissipating immediately thereafter, due to unfavourable high wind shear.

=== Tropical Cyclone Joshua ===
- Category 1 tropical cyclone (Australian scale)
- Tropical storm (SSHWS)
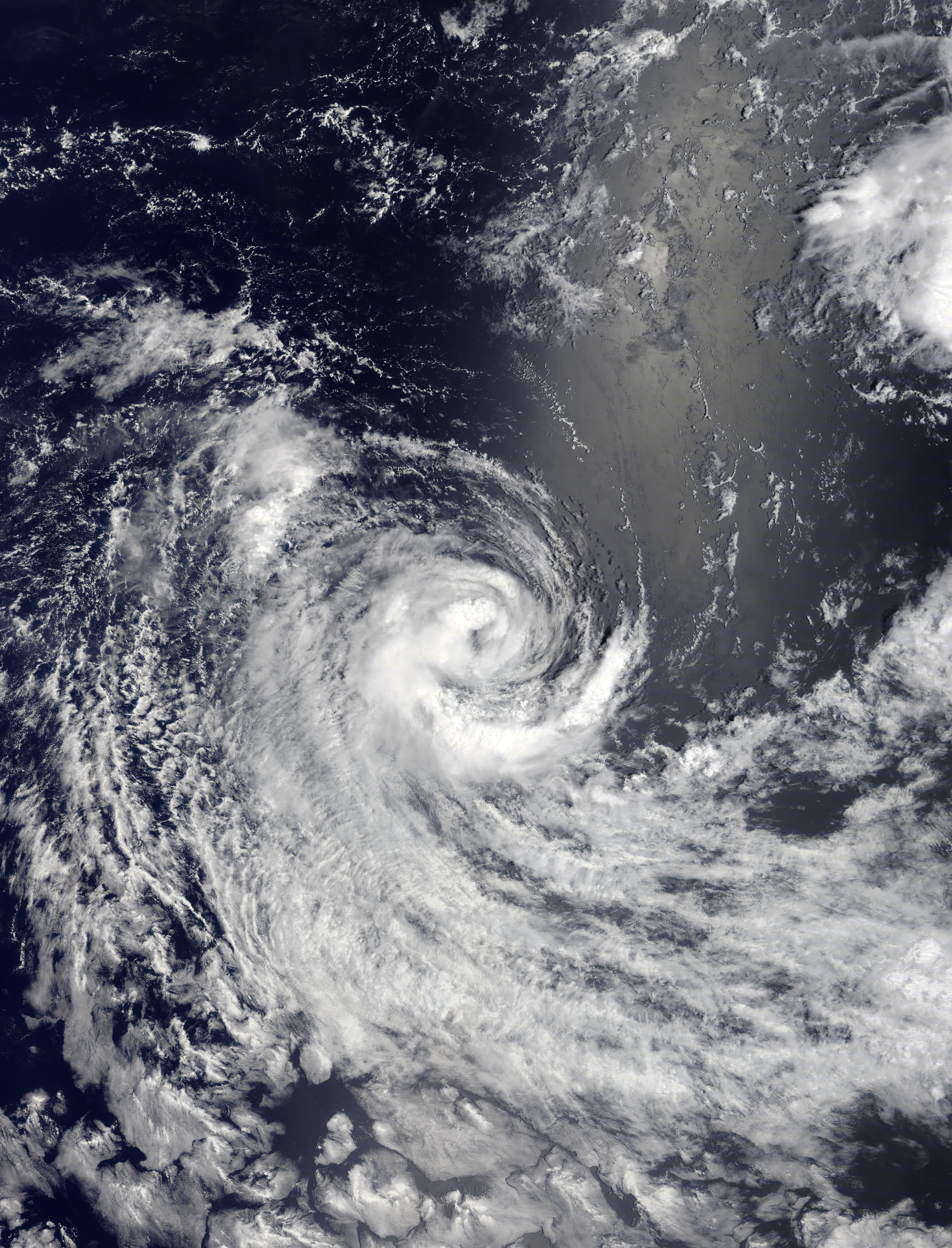
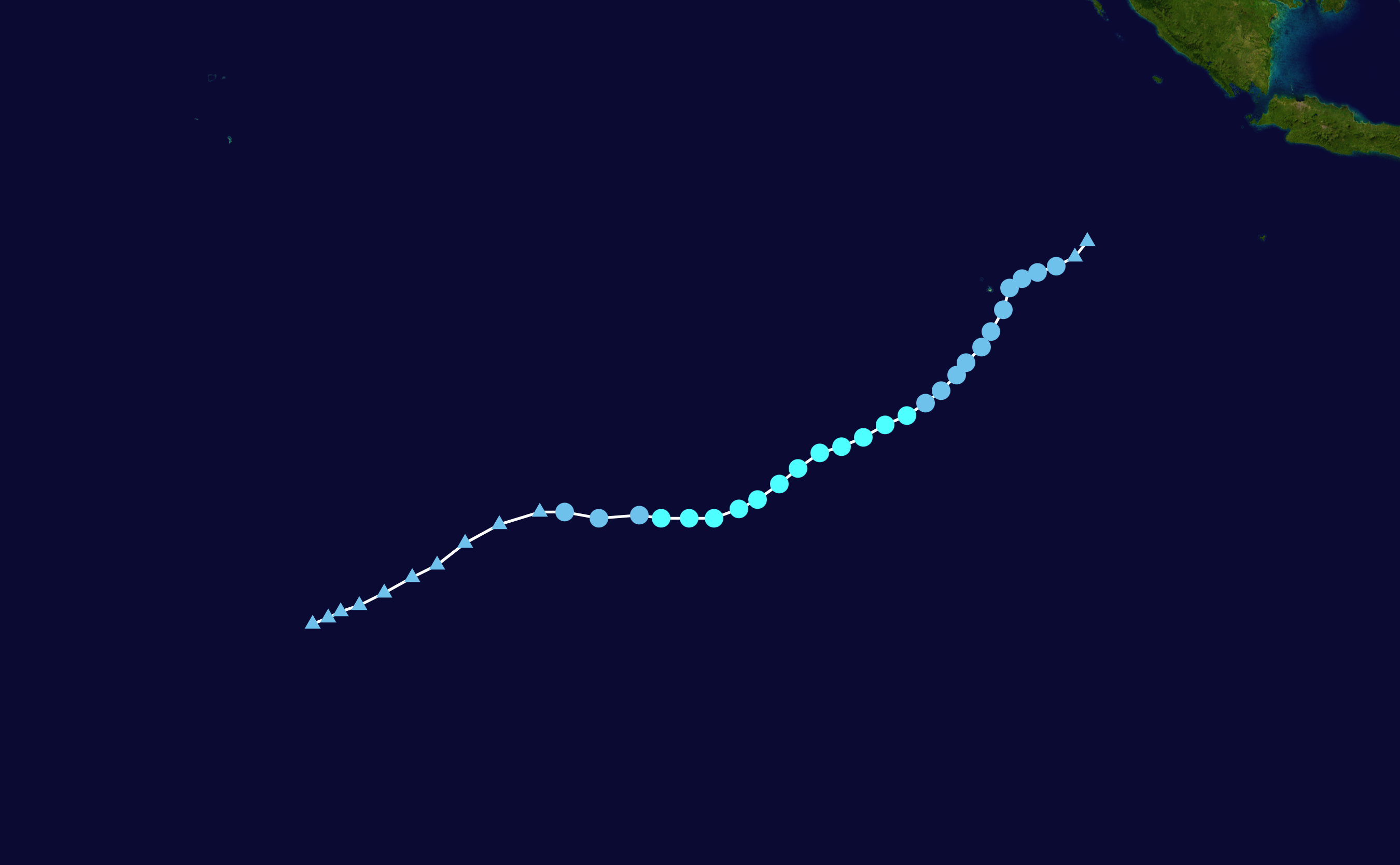
- Duration: 13 January – 17 January (Exited basin)
- Peak intensity: 75 km/h (45 mph) (10-min); 992 hPa (mbar)

On 13 January, a tropical low developed approximately 200 kilometres (120 mi) east-northeast of the Cocos Islands, which the Bureau of Meteorology (BOM) designated as 07U. Afterward, the tropical low began moving southwestward, while gradually organizing. On 16 January, gale-force winds started to develop and by 12:00 UTC on the same day, the low had intensified further into Tropical Cyclone Joshua, which became the second named storm both in the 2020–21 Australian region cyclone season and worldwide. Joshua continued to move southwestwards, before moving into the South-West Indian Ocean on 17 January.

=== Tropical Low 08U ===
- Tropical low (Australian scale)
- Tropical storm (SSHWS)
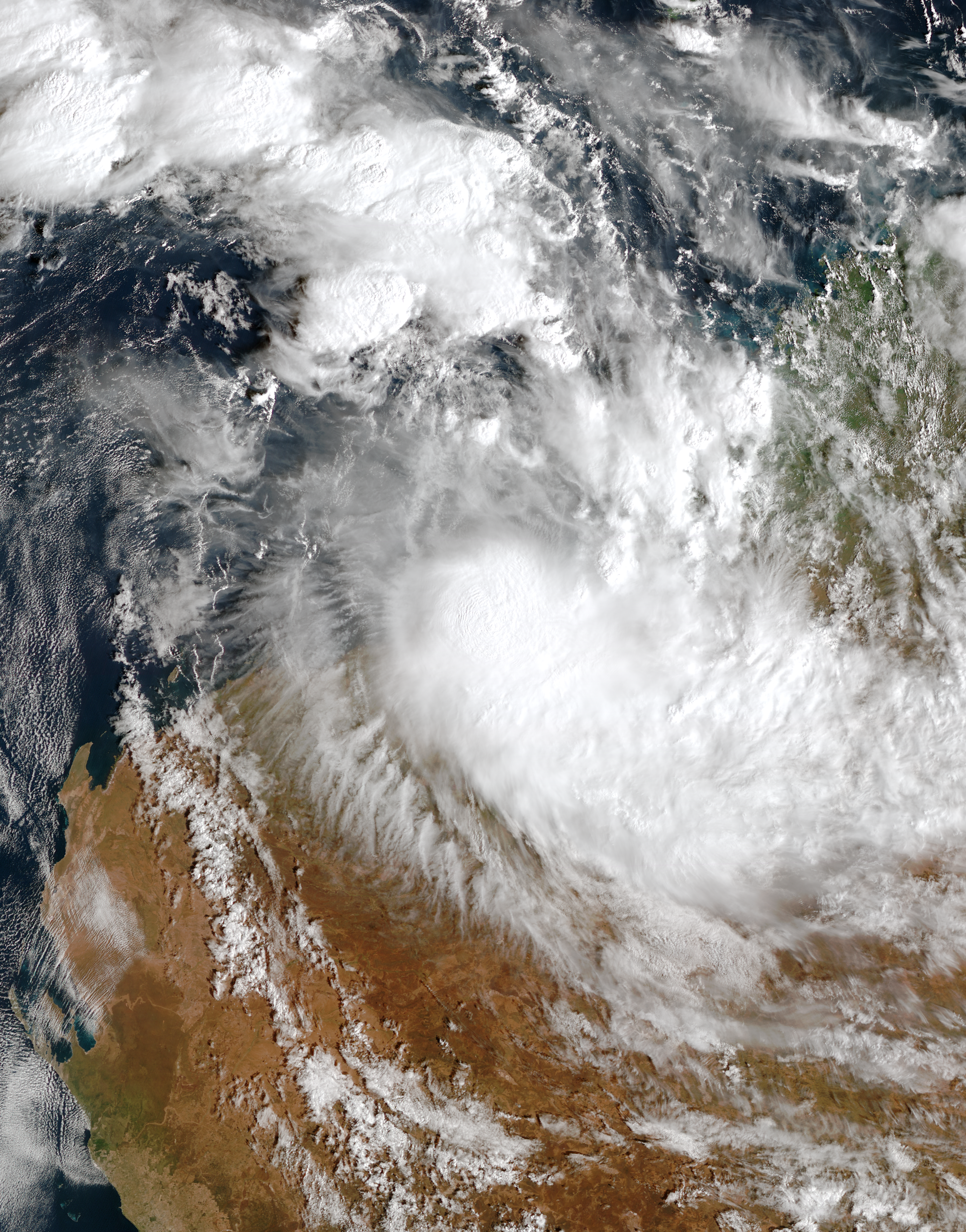
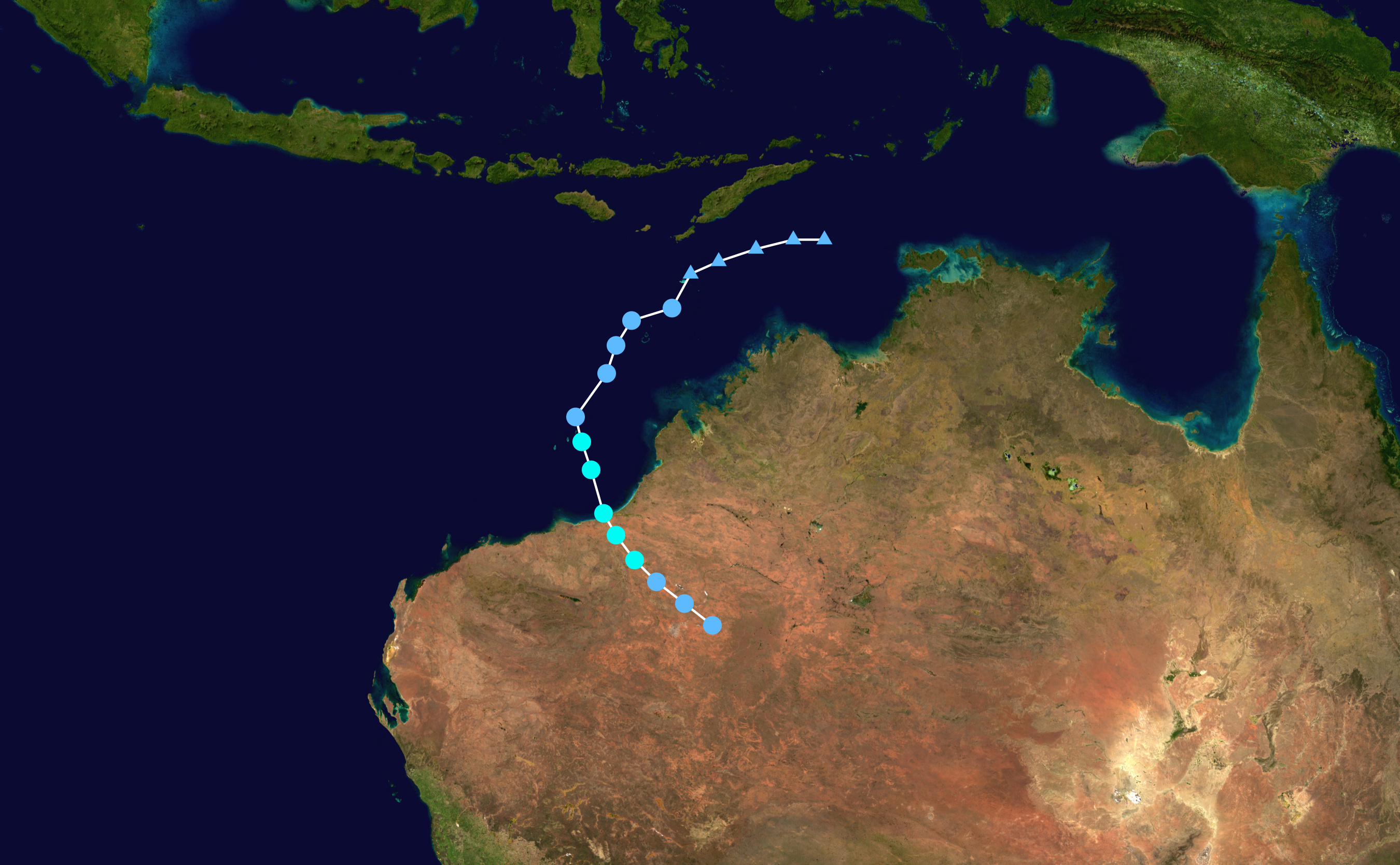
- Duration: 15 January – 23 January
- Peak intensity: 65 km/h (40 mph) (10-min); 998 hPa (mbar)

On 15 January, the BoM began monitoring a developing tropical low embedded within a monsoon trough in the Gulf of Carpentaria, near Northern Territory, designating it as 08U. The system moved ashore on Northern Territory near Nhulunbuy and emerged over the Timor Sea the next morning. The tropical low then moved slowly to the southwest for several days. The BoM issued Tropical Cyclone Watches from Bidyadanga to Roebourne on 21 January as they forecasted it to become a Category 1 tropical cyclone before landfall. Despite a favorable environment of low wind shear and high sea surface temperatures, the storm remained a tropical low due to lack of outflow. On the same day, the JTWC issued a Tropical Cyclone Formation Alert (TCFA) due to an improvement in the structure of the storm. The JTWC upgraded it to Tropical Storm 14S the next day as the system had gale-force winds; however, the BoM didn't upgrade the tropical low to a Category 1 cyclone. Later, the storm made landfall over Western Australia near Broome, and the JTWC issued its final warning soon thereafter. The low rapidly weakened before dissipating completely on 23 January, as it entered South Australia.

As early as 20 January, the communities in Pilbara and Kimberley were advised to prepare for the storm's heavy rain and destructive winds, with tourists being urged to evacuate sooner. However, damages are less than initially feared.

=== Tropical Cyclone Kimi ===
- Category 1 tropical cyclone (Australian scale)
- Tropical storm (SSHWS)
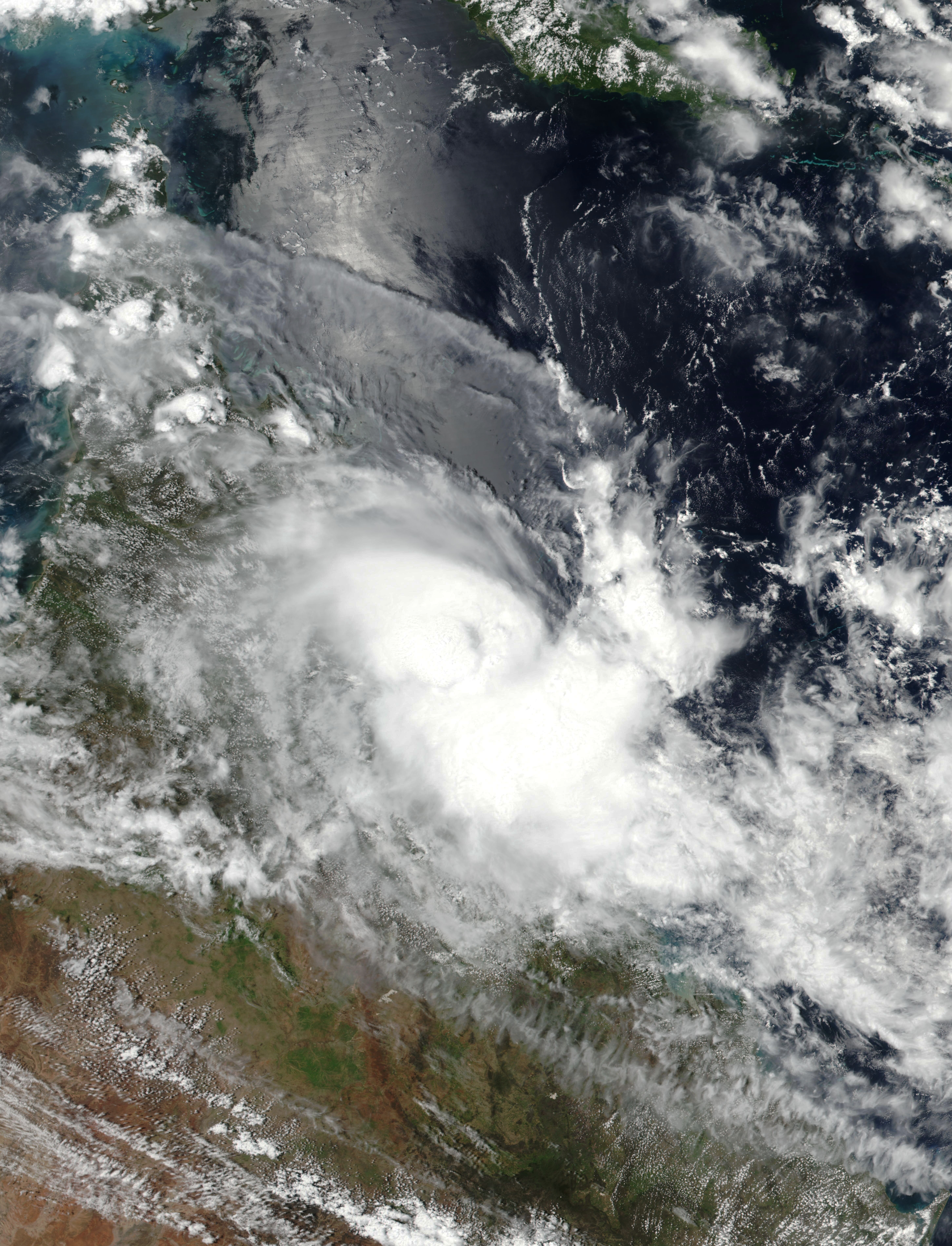
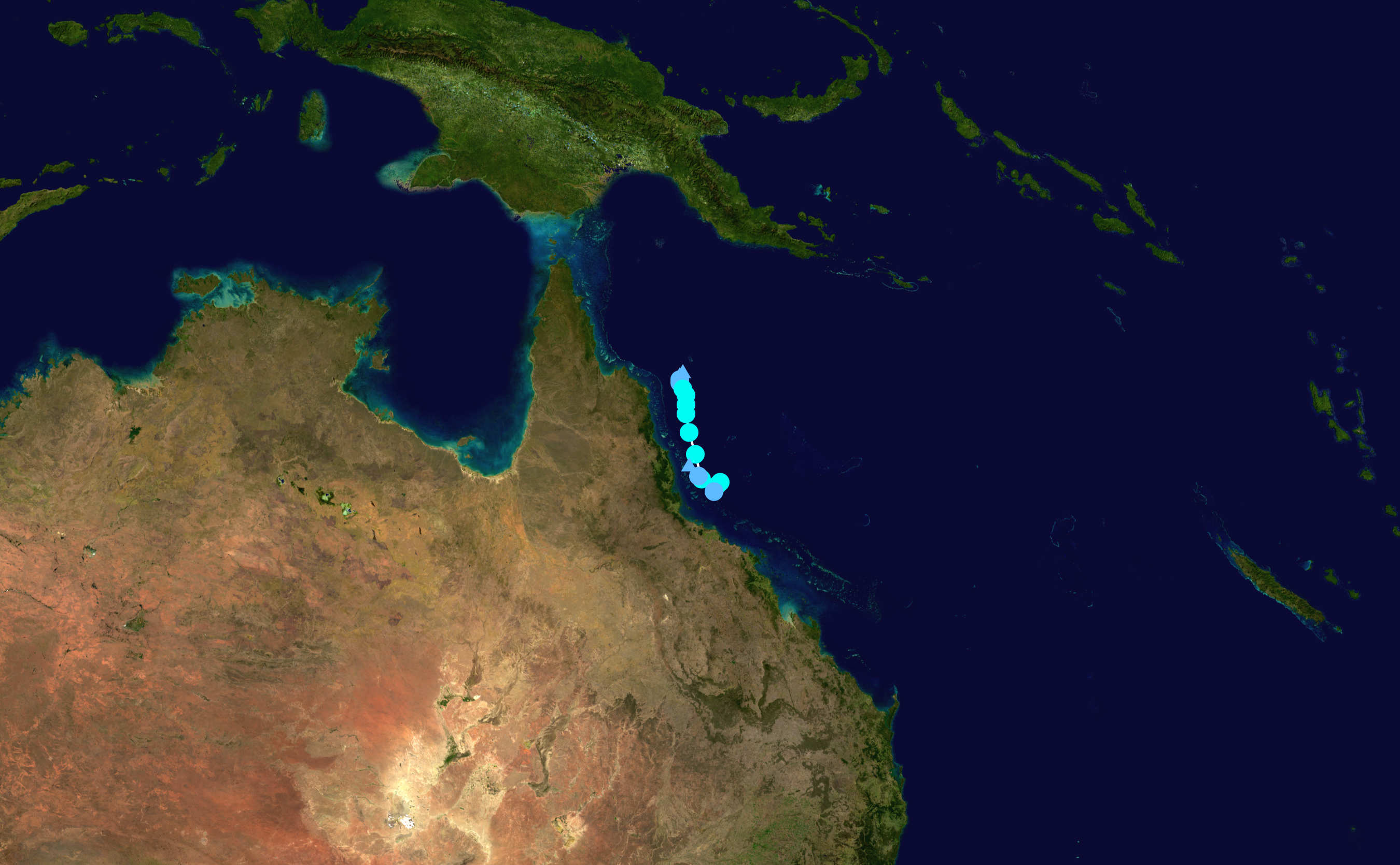
- Duration: 16 January – 19 January
- Peak intensity: 85 km/h (50 mph) (10-min); 990 hPa (mbar)

On 12 January, the Bureau of Meteorology noted that a monsoonal trough could develop within a week, that would make conditions in the Australian Region basin favorable for tropical cyclogenesis. On 16 January, a weak tropical low formed to the northeast of Queensland. Later that day, the Joint Typhoon Warning Center (JTWC) issued a Tropical Cyclone Formation Alert on the system. At 02:10 UTC on 17 January, the Bureau of Meteorology upgraded the tropical low into Tropical Cyclone Kimi, while located northeast of Cooktown. A small tropical cyclone, Kimi moved slowly southward while remaining offshore of the Australian coastline. Late on 17 January, radar imagery from Cairns developed low-level convective rainbands, which wrapped into the storm's center of circulation. Around this time, Kimi grew large bursts of deep convection, with a well-defined circulation visible on satellite imagery. However organization began to slow on 18 January, with convection becoming displaced to the west of the center. Radar from Townsville and satellite imagery showed that some unexpected wind shear had caused convection to now become displaced to the southeast of the center as the deep convection began to weaken from the wind shear. The wind shear also caused Kimi began to move away from the coast of Australia. Late on 18 January, Tropical Cyclone Kimi weakened into a tropical low while moving slowly away from the North Queensland coast.

On 17 January, a Tropical Cyclone Warning was put in effect from Cape Melville to Cardwell in Queensland, which extended inland to Palmer and Chillagoe. By the next day, a Tropical Cyclone Watch had been issued from Ayr to Bowen, while most of the initial warning zone had been cancelled. A Flood Watch was issued for areas expected to receive heavy rainfall from the storm. The Queensland Fire and Emergency Services advised residents to prepare emergency supplies in the limited time available before the storm. The emergency services also provided sandbags and tarps to protect structures. The Cairns Central was closed on 18 January. The Flecker Botanical Gardens briefly ceased operation starting on 17 January, and the Daintree River Ferry operated for only a part of 18 January. Offshore Cairns, roughly 200 people on Fitzroy Island were evacuated. Ports in Cairns, Port Douglas, Innisfail, and Cooktown were only open for emergency movements, as well as Half Moon Bay Marina. Meteorologist Shane Kennedy said that Kimi will bring significant impacts regardless if it intensifies or not. They also noted that there was a flood risk due to the impacts of Cyclone Imogen. Eleanor Rosam of the SES said crews, such as swiftwater rescue personnel, have been sent on stand-by for the potential impacts of Kimi. She urged those in the path of the incoming storm to prepare. As Kimi became less of a threat to Cairns, many places and services that had previously announced cancellations and closure were reopened. As Kimi moved further south, the Townsville Airport ceased operations between 18 and 19 January. The cyclone prompted an emergency alert for Palm Island, which expected a close pass. As early as 18 January, large waves occurred between the towns of Yarrabah and Lucinda in the Australian state of Queensland. Areas still received flash flooding despite the absence of a direct hit from Kimi, most notably around Innisfail, which recorded some of the highest rainfall totals including a 158 mm (6.22 in) reading at a gauge in the town.

=== Tropical Low 10U ===
- Tropical low (Australian scale)
- Tropical storm (SSHWS)
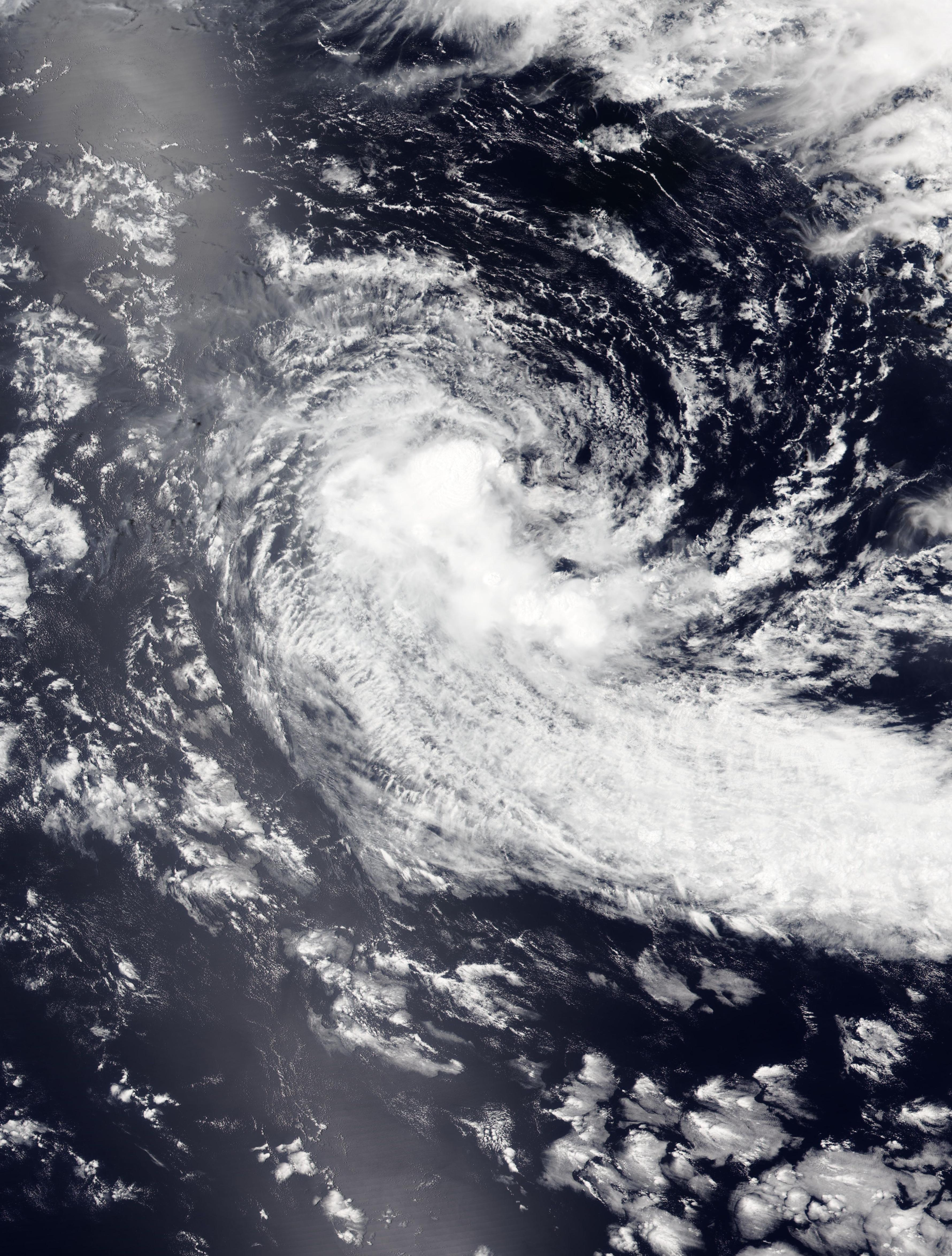
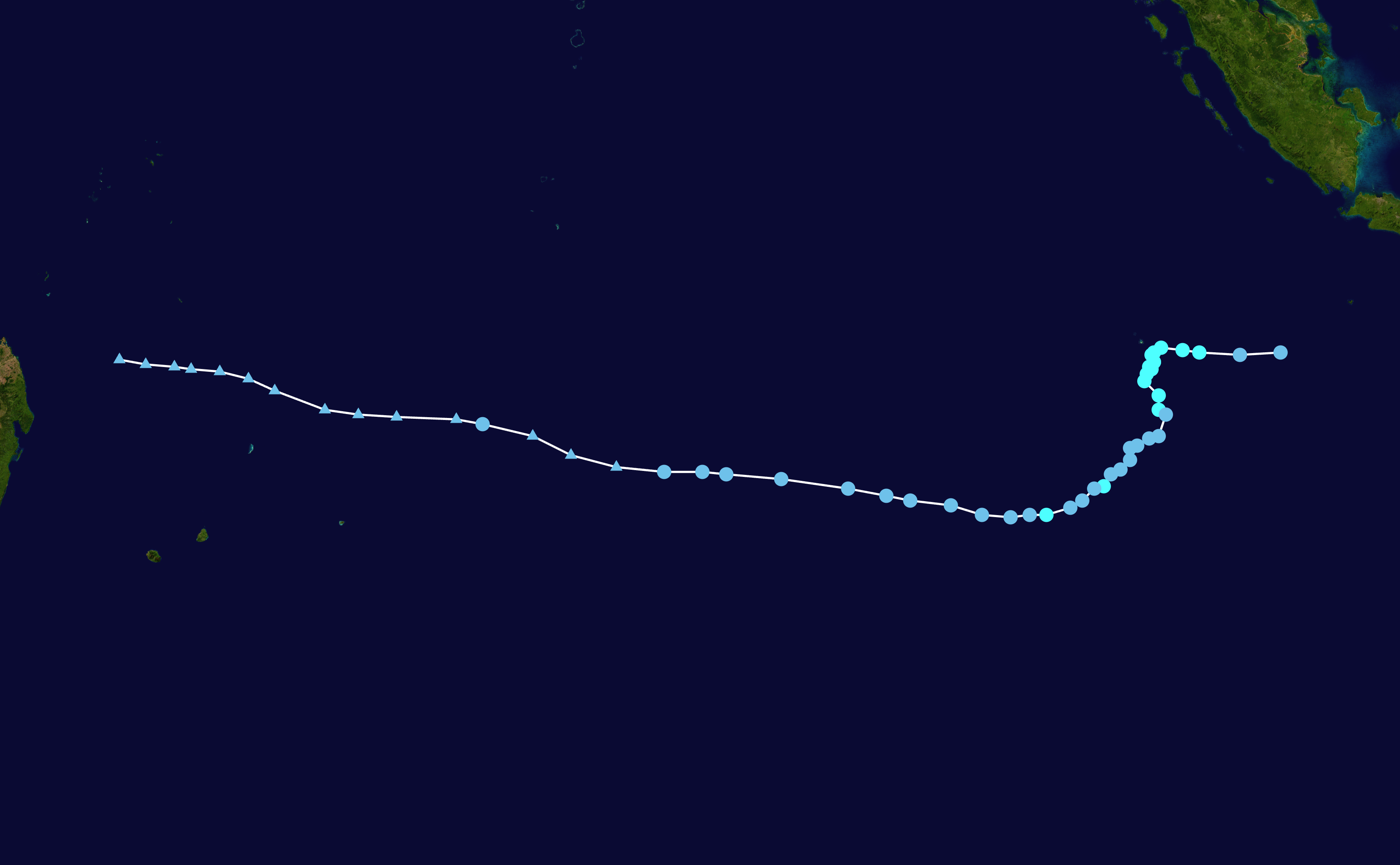
- Duration: 19 January – 27 January (Exited basin)
- Peak intensity: 75 km/h (45 mph) (10-min); 995 hPa (mbar)

On 19 January, a tropical low formed to the southeast of Christmas Island, with the BoM designating the system as 10U. The low moved towards the west, prompting the BoM to issue rainfall warnings to the Cocos Islands by that time. The JTWC issued a Tropical Cyclone Formation Alert on the same day and upgraded it as Tropical Storm 13S by the next morning on the Saffir–Simpson scale. It passed very close to the Cocos Islands while having gale-force winds, before turning towards the south late on 21 January. Despite favorable conditions, the tropical low remained weak due to persistent high wind shear around the system. The JTWC reported that maximum one-minute sustained winds of 10U peaked at 65 km/h (40 mph) while BoM recorded ten-minute sustained winds of 75 km/h (45 mph). Despite these wind readings, the low was not named due to gale winds not exceeding half of the storm's centre. Without any further intensification, it exited the basin towards the South-West Indian Ocean basin on 27 January and was reclassified as Tropical Depression 09.

=== Tropical Cyclone Lucas ===
- Category 2 tropical cyclone (Australian scale)
- Tropical storm (SSHWS)
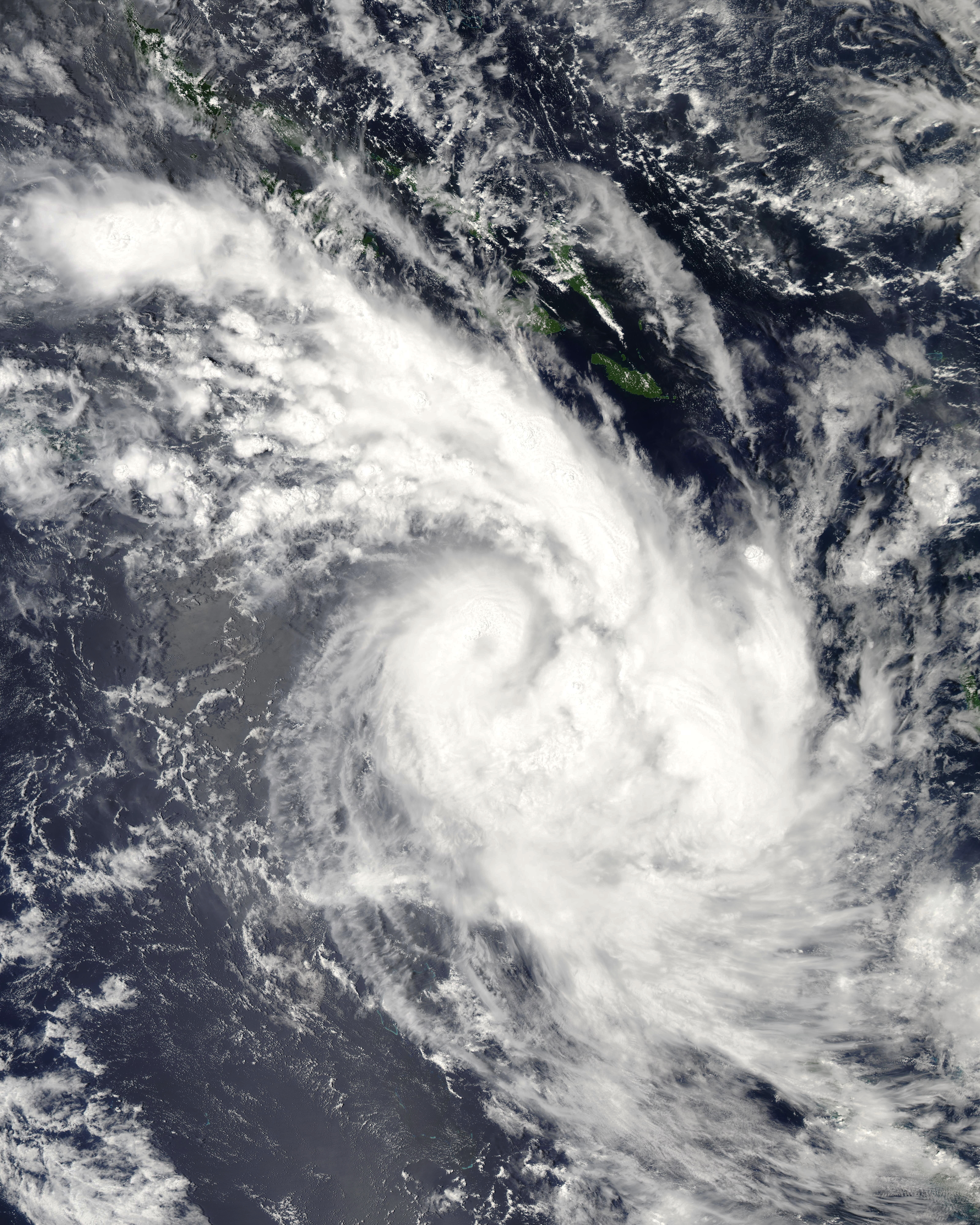
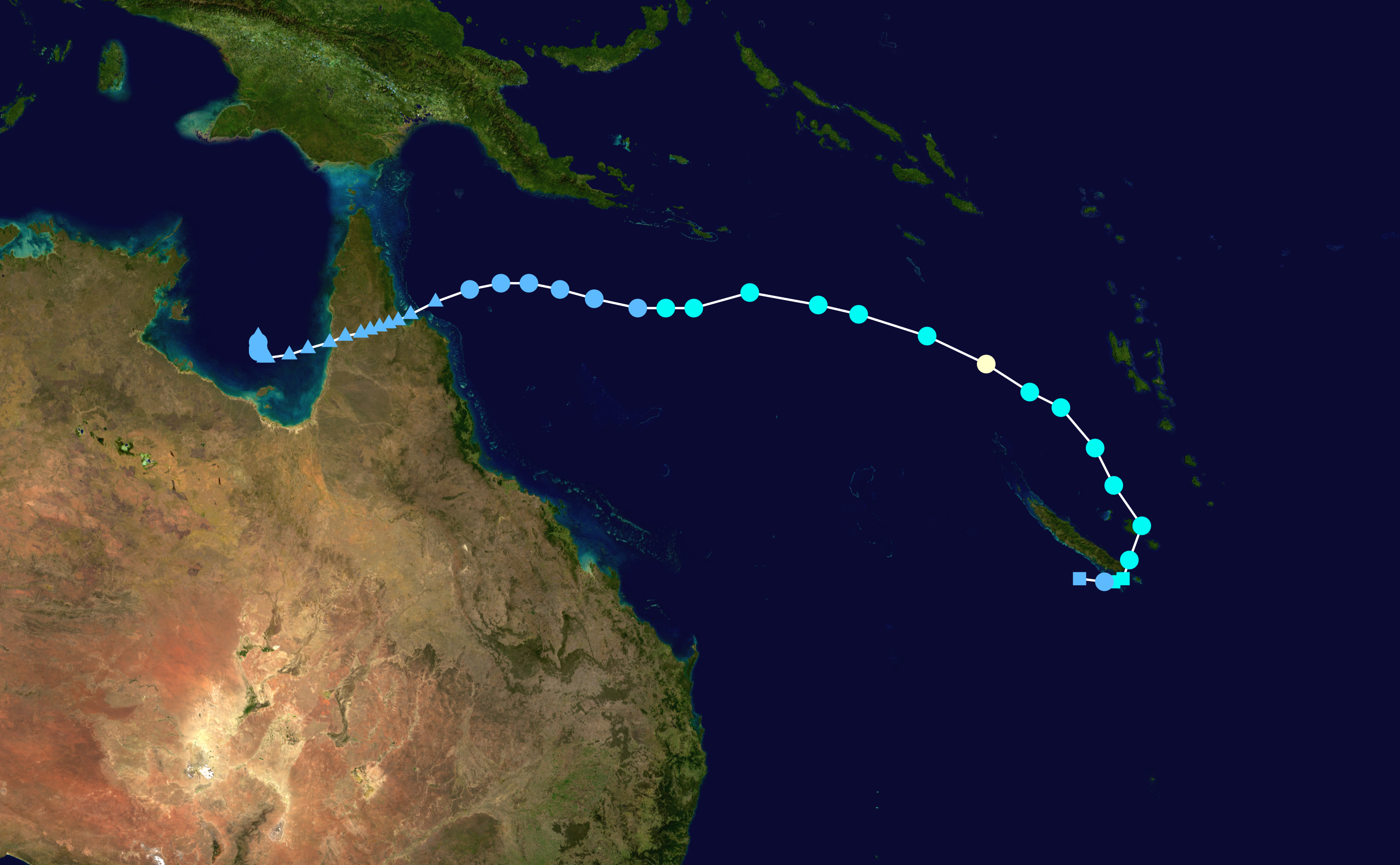
- Duration: 25 January – 1 February (Exited basin)
- Peak intensity: 100 km/h (65 mph) (10-min); 985 hPa (mbar)

On 25 January, a tropical low formed from a monsoon trough in the Gulf of Carpentaria, about 210 kilometres (130 mi) to the north of Mornington Island, with the BoM designating the system as 11U. The system slowly moved to the east, before moving ashore over Cape York Peninsula near Pormpuraaw on 27 January. It weakened as it traversed land and on 29 January, it moved offshore on Princess Charlotte Bay as it continued to move eastward. On the afternoon of 31 January, it strengthened further to Tropical Cyclone Lucas while moving away from the Queensland coast. On the afternoon of 1 February, Lucas crossed into the South Pacific cyclone region as a Category 2 tropical cyclone, to the north-northwest of Nouméa, New Caledonia.

=== Tropical Low 12U ===
- Tropical low (Australian scale)
- Tropical storm (SSHWS)
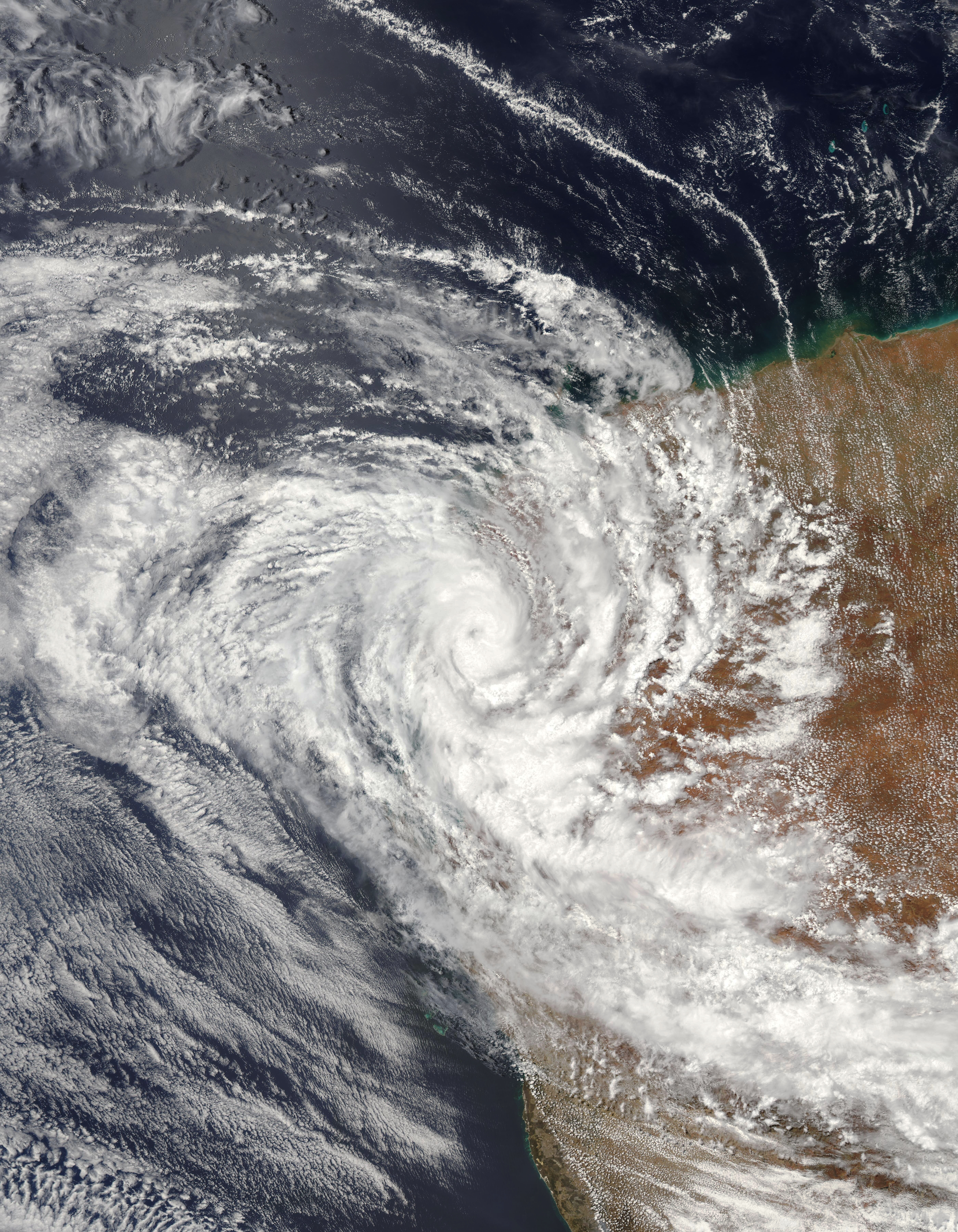
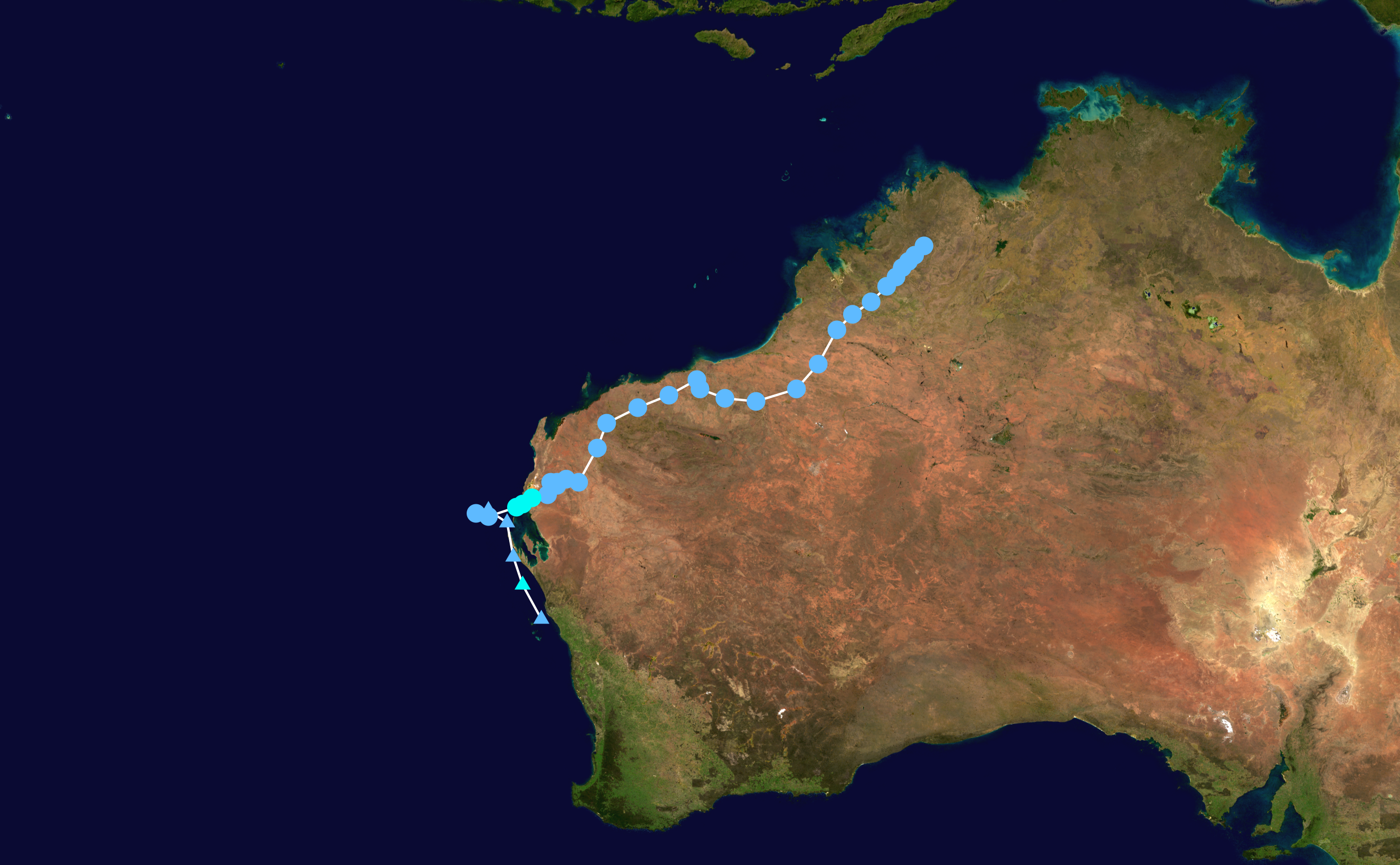
- Duration: 28 January – 5 February
- Peak intensity: 55 km/h (35 mph) (10-min); 992 hPa (mbar)

During 25 January, the BoM reported that Tropical Low 12U was forming over the southern Joseph Bonaparte Gulf. At that time, the tropical low was already producing heavy rainfall and gusty winds across the Kimberley and Pilbara coast. On 28 January, the BoM reported that the tropical low had developed over the coastal region of the Northern Territory, with the low proceeding to move southwestward, overland. The storm moved in a southwestward direction over Australia's coastal region for the next several days, roughly parallel to the coastline. Early on 4 February, 12U emerged over water near Shark Bay, as the storm turned to the west. Upon emerging over water, 12U began to strengthen slowly. However, on 5 February, the BoM issued their final warning for 12U, as it was no longer expected to develop into a tropical cyclone. The JTWC followed suit and issued their final warning on the system. Later that day, the tropical low turned back towards the coast and became extratropical, before proceeding to move south-southeastward, along the coastline of Western Australia. On 8 February, the system left the coast of Australia, before being absorbed into another extratropical storm a day later.

=== Severe Tropical Cyclone Marian ===
- Category 4 severe tropical cyclone (Australian scale)
- Category 3 tropical cyclone (SSHWS)
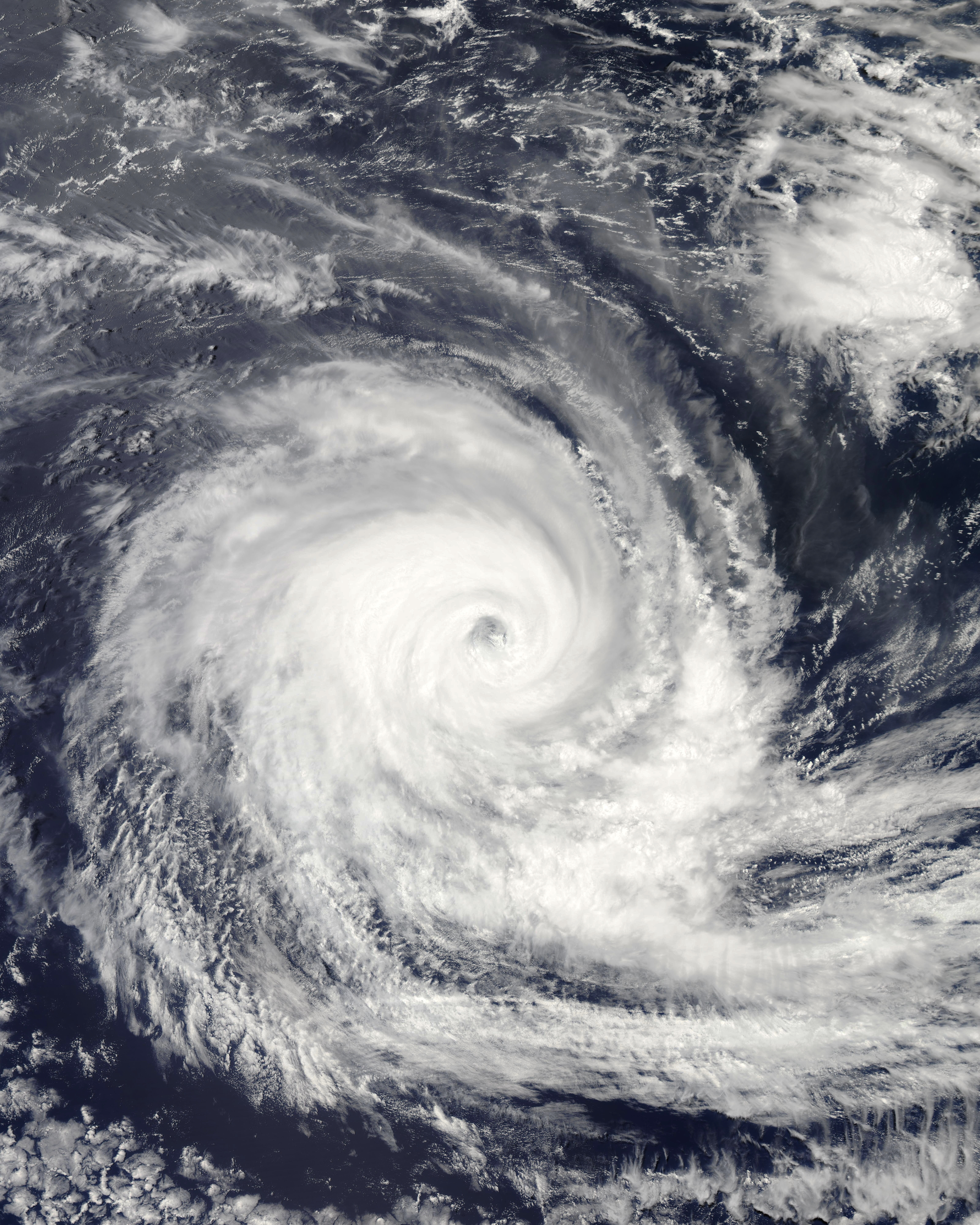
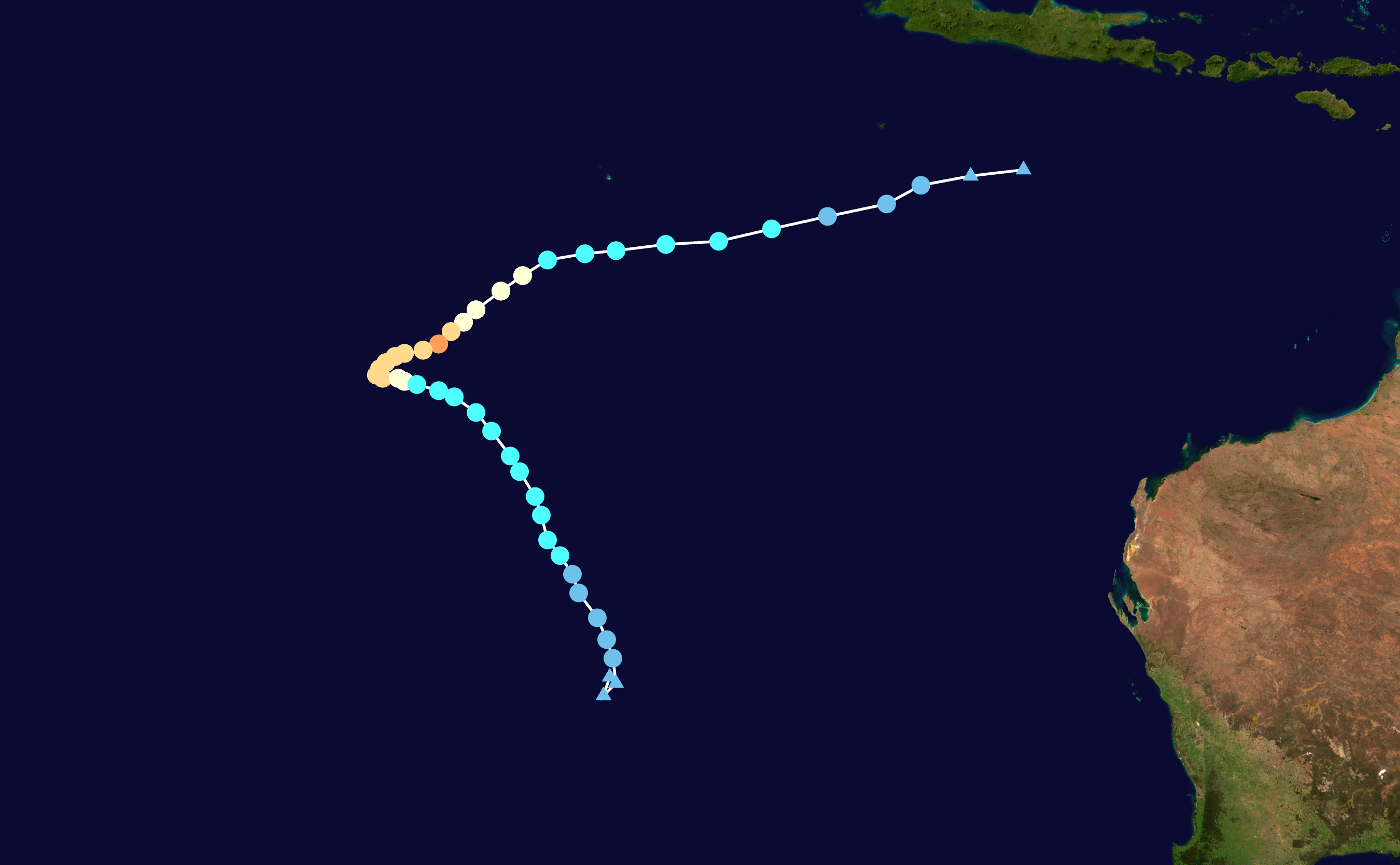
- Duration: 21 February – 9 March (Out of basin on 1–2 March)
- Peak intensity: 165 km/h (105 mph) (10-min); 951 hPa (mbar)

On 21 February, a tropical low formed, approximately 540 kilometres (340 mi) to the north-northwest of Broome, with the BoM designating the system as 15U. At 03:30 UTC on 25 February the JTWC issued a TCFA on the disturbance, tracking it as Invest 98S. Roughly 24 hours later, the agency released its first warning on the tropical cyclone. By 06:00 UTC that day, the BOM upgraded the tropical low into a tropical cyclone, giving it the name Marian. Soon after formation, the storm started to rapidly intensify amid favorable conditions, and early on 28 February, the storm reached Severe Tropical Cyclone status, with a well-defined eye surrounded by intense convection. Meanwhile, the JTWC assessed the storm as a Category 2-equivalent tropical cyclone, before upgrading it to a Category 3-equivalent storm later that day. The storm briefly crossed into the MFR's area of responsibility before abruptly turning to the southeast where it reached the peak intensity. It again reentered into the Australian region basin on 2 March and very slowly weakened. By 6 March, the storm was downgraded to a tropical low as it encountered high wind shear and sea surface temperatures as low as 24 °C, while it rapidly weakened.

=== Severe Tropical Cyclone Niran ===
- Category 5 severe tropical cyclone (Australian scale)
- Category 5 tropical cyclone (SSHWS)
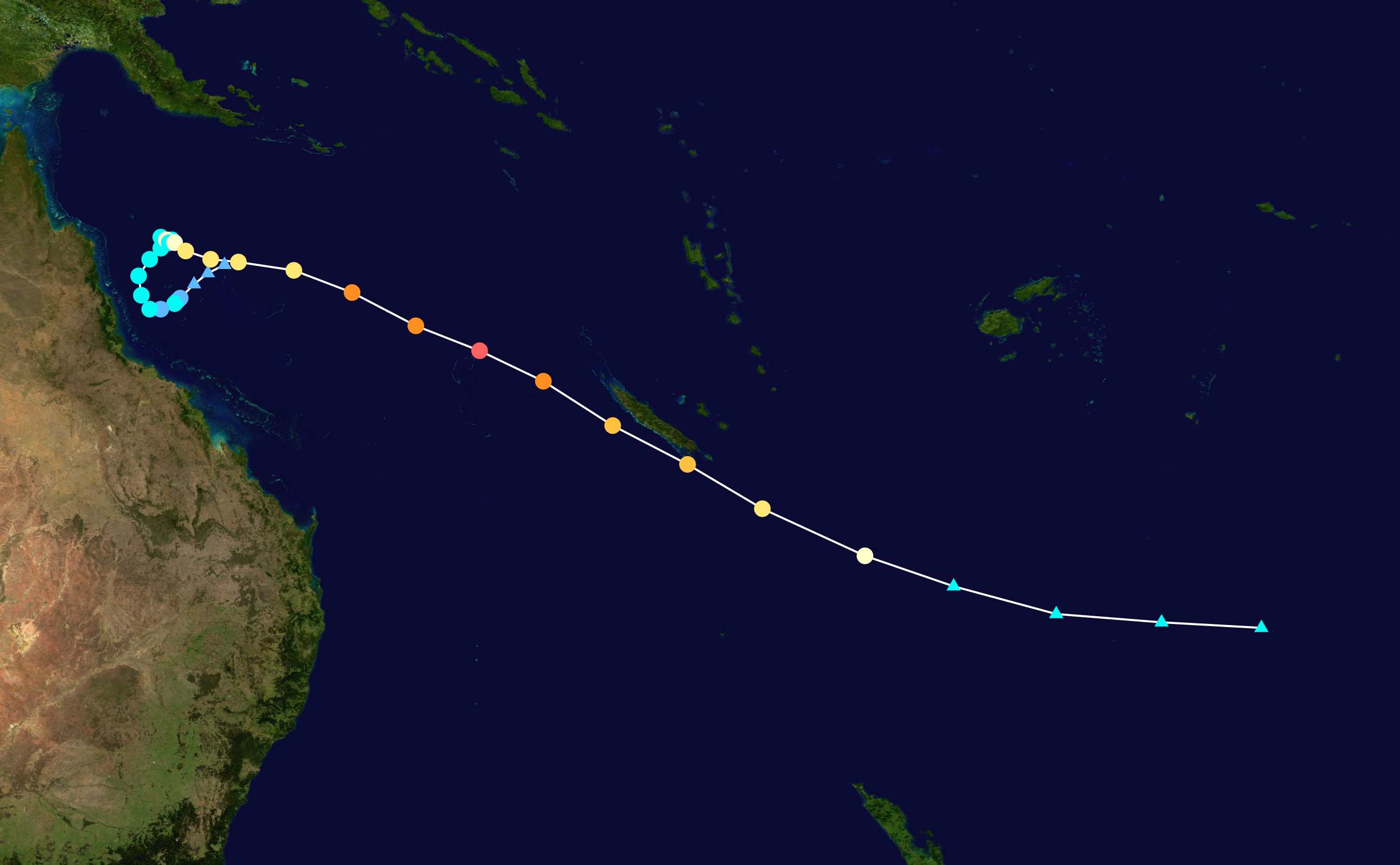
- Duration: 27 February – 5 March (Exited basin)
- Peak intensity: 205 km/h (125 mph) (10-min); 931 hPa (mbar)

During 27 February, the Bureau of Meteorology (BOM) began to monitor a developing tropical low off the coast of northern Queensland. The low began to strengthen while remaining offshore the state, within an area favorable for tropical cyclogenesis. On 1 March, the tropical low was upgraded into a tropical cyclone by the BOM, and was provided the name Niran. Later that same day, the strengthening cyclone reached Category 2 status on the Australian scale. Niran soon began to pull away from the coast of Australia while intensifying, reaching Category 3 status on the Australian scale, late on 3 March. Niran later reached category 4 status on the Australian scale late on the next day and Category 5 on 5 March. The storm accelerated southwestwards and crossed into the FMS' area of responsibility on 6 March whilst weakening.

Niran did an extensive amount of damage to banana crops in Queensland. Farmers assessed the crop damage to be A$200 million (US$154 million), and there were fears that the prices for bananas would jump again. Damage to farm infrastructure was labeled "catastrophic" and "severe" by locals. In production nurseries, shade houses and tree crops were damaged. Stephen Lowe, the council chief executive of The Australian Banana Growers’ Council, estimated about 5,000 hectares of crops were affected, and 150 farms were damaged.

=== Tropical Low 21U ===
- Tropical low (Australian scale)
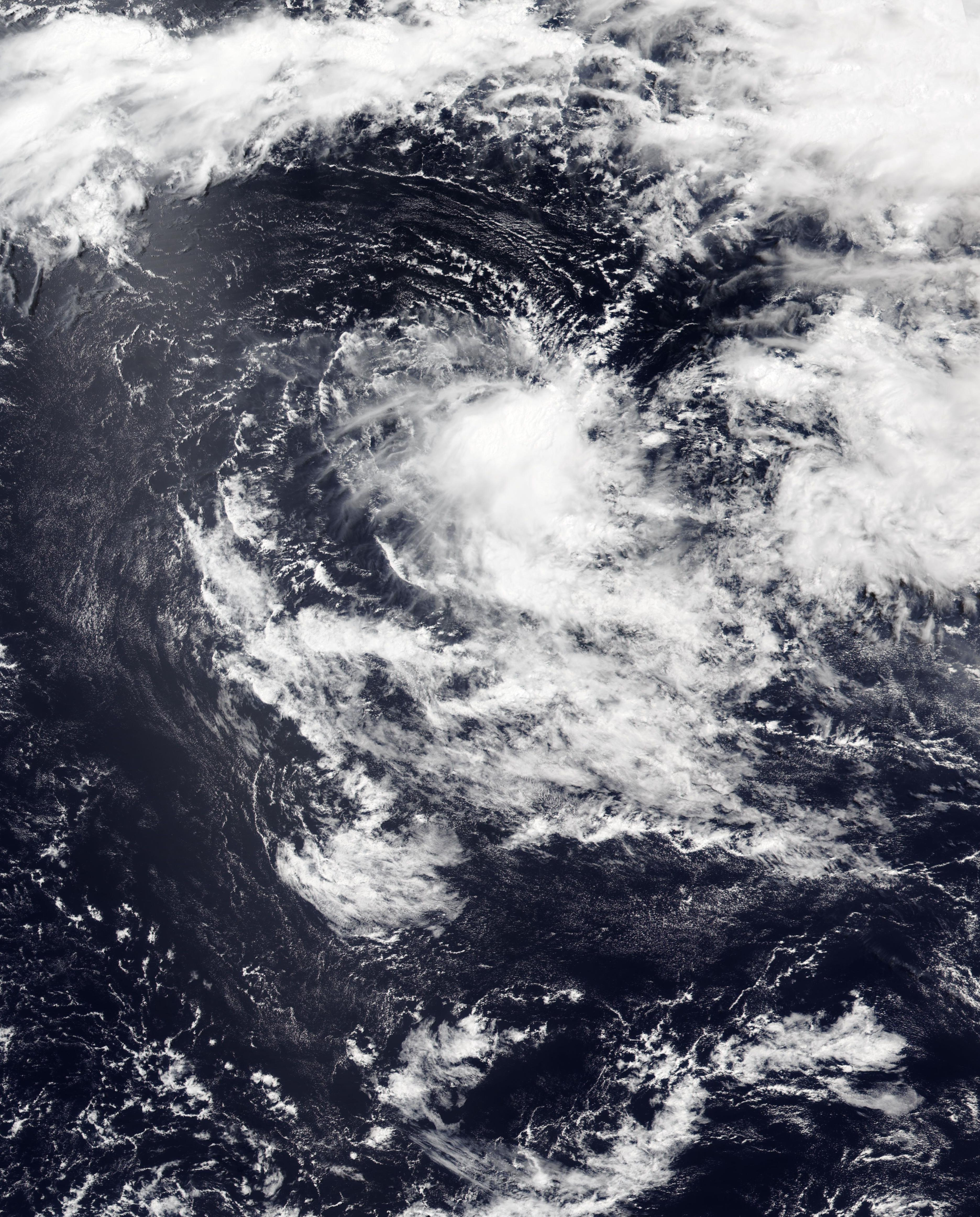
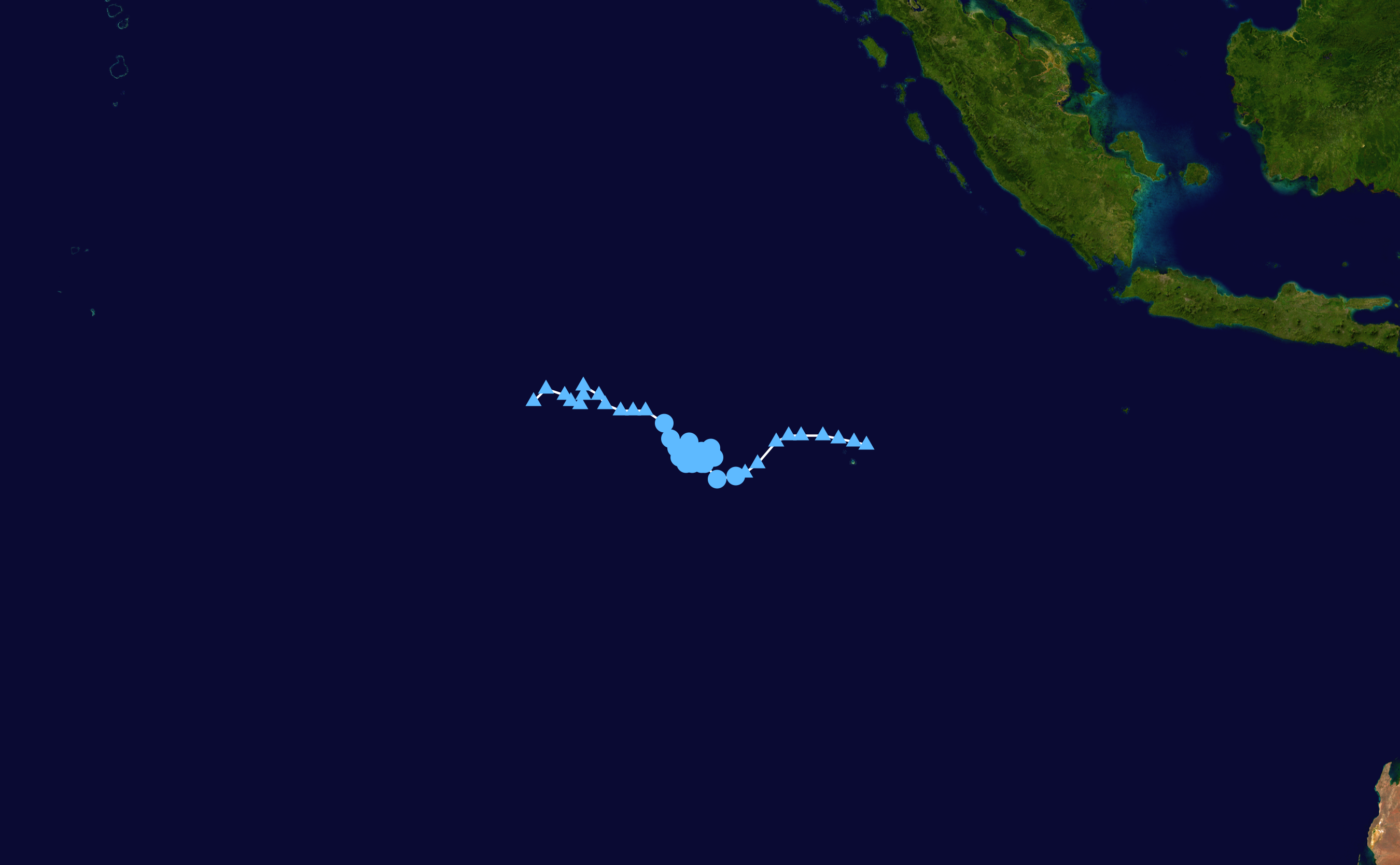
- Duration: 21 March – 26 March
- Peak intensity: 65 km/h (40 mph) (10-min); 1000 hPa (mbar)

A tropical low developed near the Cocos Islands on 21 March, with the BoM designating the system as 21U as it moved west-northwest at 8 km/h. It was last noted on 26 March.

=== Severe Tropical Cyclone Seroja ===
- Category 3 severe tropical cyclone (Australian scale)
- Category 1 tropical cyclone (SSHWS)
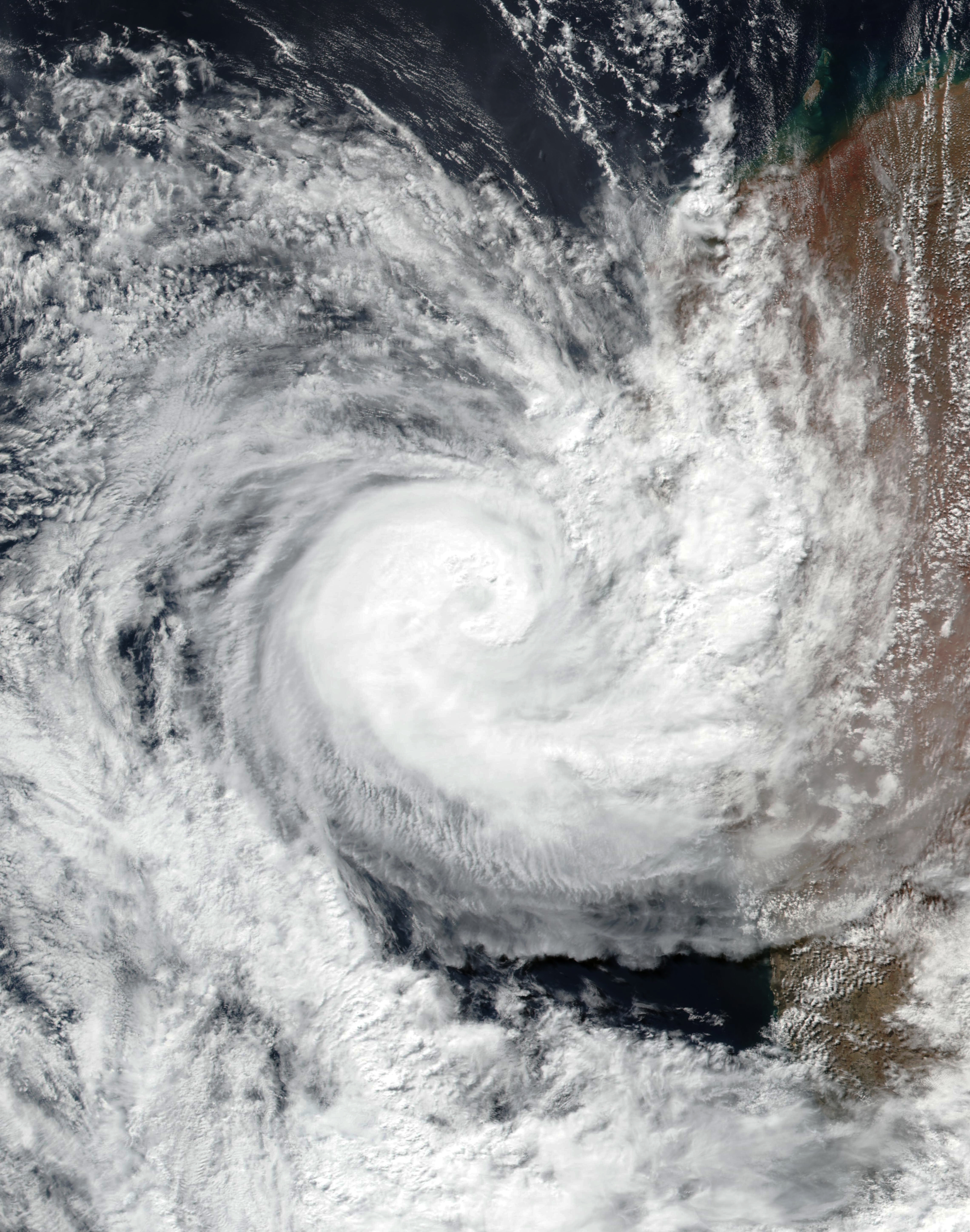
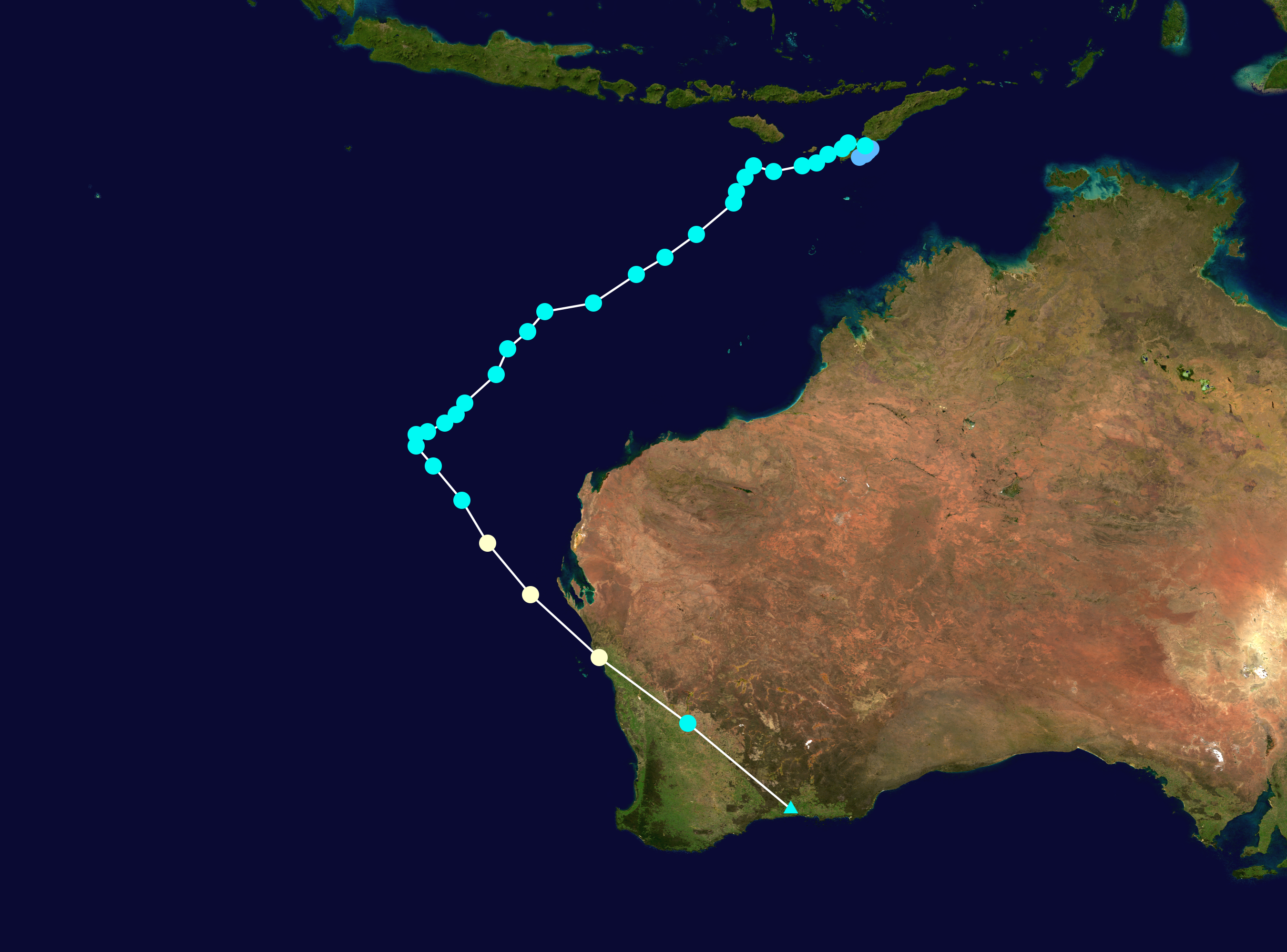
- Duration: 3 April – 12 April
- Peak intensity: 120 km/h (75 mph) (10-min); 971 hPa (mbar)

On 29 March, the BoM mentioned that Tropical Low 22U was forming to the south of Timor. By 3 April, the tropical low fully developed within an active trough. The low was located in a generally favorable environment with deep moisture, low vertical wind shear, and defined outflow. The low drifted close to the coast of Timor very slowly with persistent spiraling bands of convection occupying the storm's circulation, producing prolific rainfall in the surrounding regions on 3–4 April. At this time, the low-pressure system was located inside the Area of Responsibility (AoR) of TCWC Jakarta. By the early morning of 4 April, the presentation of its structure had improved with spiral bands of deep convection and tight curvature at its center. Although there were fluctuations in central convection, a favorable environment of deep moisture, low vertical wind shear, and good outflow meant further development of the system was expected. Meanwhile, the Joint Typhoon Warning Center (JTWC) issued their first warning on the storm as Tropical Cyclone 26S at 15:00 on UTC 4 April. The tropical low slowly gained strength, intensifying to a Category 1 tropical cyclone, and was given the name Seroja by the Tropical Cyclone Warning Centre (TCWC) Jakarta at 20:00 UTC on 4 April, about 95 km (59 mi) north-northwest of Rote Island.

During 5 April, Seroja continued to move at 3 km/h (1.9 mph) in a west-southwest direction, away from the Indonesian coastline. The storm intensified to a Category 2 tropical cyclone at 19:00 UTC with 10-minute sustained winds of 105 km/h (65 mph) and its central pressure having deepened to 982 mb (29.00 inHg). Long term uncertainty in both track and intensity persisted in the forecasting of Seroja's track, due to interaction with Tropical Low 23U, to the far west of the storm. Seroja held this strength for roughly 12 hours before unexpectedly weakening to a Category 1 tropical cyclone yet again on 6 April, due to southeasterly wind shear and dry air partially exposing the low level circulation (LLC) and degrading its thunderstorm activity. Seroja fluctuated in strength for several hours, intensifying slightly on 7 April as it continued in a generally southwesterly direction. Seroja became disorganized on satellite imagery as convection became dislocated to the south on 8 April, while it began to interact with Tropical Cyclone Odette just to the northwest, as a result of the Fujiwhara effect, complicating the forecasts for the tropical cyclone and causing it to weaken again. Seroja resumed intensification by the next day, re-intensifying into a Category 2 tropical cyclone at 13:16 UTC on 9 April, as the storm began to weaken and absorb Odette, and wind shear started to ease off. On 10 April, Odette had lost most of its convection, and the storm began to be drawn into Seroja's circulation, before being absorbed into Seroja later that day. Afterward, Seroja turned southeastward while strengthening, becoming a Category 3 severe tropical cyclone early on 11 April. Seroja continued rapidly accelerating towards the southeast, before making landfall near Gregory, Western Australia, or just north of Geraldton at peak strength, with 1-minute sustained winds of 130 km/h (80 mph), 10-minute sustained winds of 120 km/h (75 mph), and a minimum central pressure of 971 hPa (28.7 inHg), with observations of gusts as high as 150 km/h (95 mph). Following landfall, Seroja accelerated to the southeast while gradually weakening, before transitioning into an extratropical cyclone later that day.

As a tropical low, Seroja caused widespread rainfall and thunderstorms in the East Nusa Tenggara province of Indonesia. Within the province in East Flores Regency, 44 people were thought to have died and 9 people were critically injured from mudslides, burying their homes and bodies while bridges and roads connecting to Flores Island and Adonara Island were destroyed. The death toll was later lowered to 41 after search and rescue teams reverified the victims' health, although an additional 27 were cited to be missing. In East Timor, 3 people died in a landslide including a two-year-old child. East Timor Prime Minister Taur Matan Ruak cited the floods as one of the most devastating incidents to effect the country in 40 years. By 9 April, the death toll had risen to 209 with 167 dead in Indonesia and 42 in East Timor. Damage from Seroja in East Timor was expected to exceed US$100 million, according to Prime Minister Taur Matan Ruak. In Western Australia, damage from Seroja was estimated to cost up to AUD$200 million (US$155 million). Overall, the storm caused over $255 million (2021 USD) in damages.

=== Tropical Cyclone Odette ===
- Category 2 tropical cyclone (Australian scale)
- Tropical storm (SSHWS)
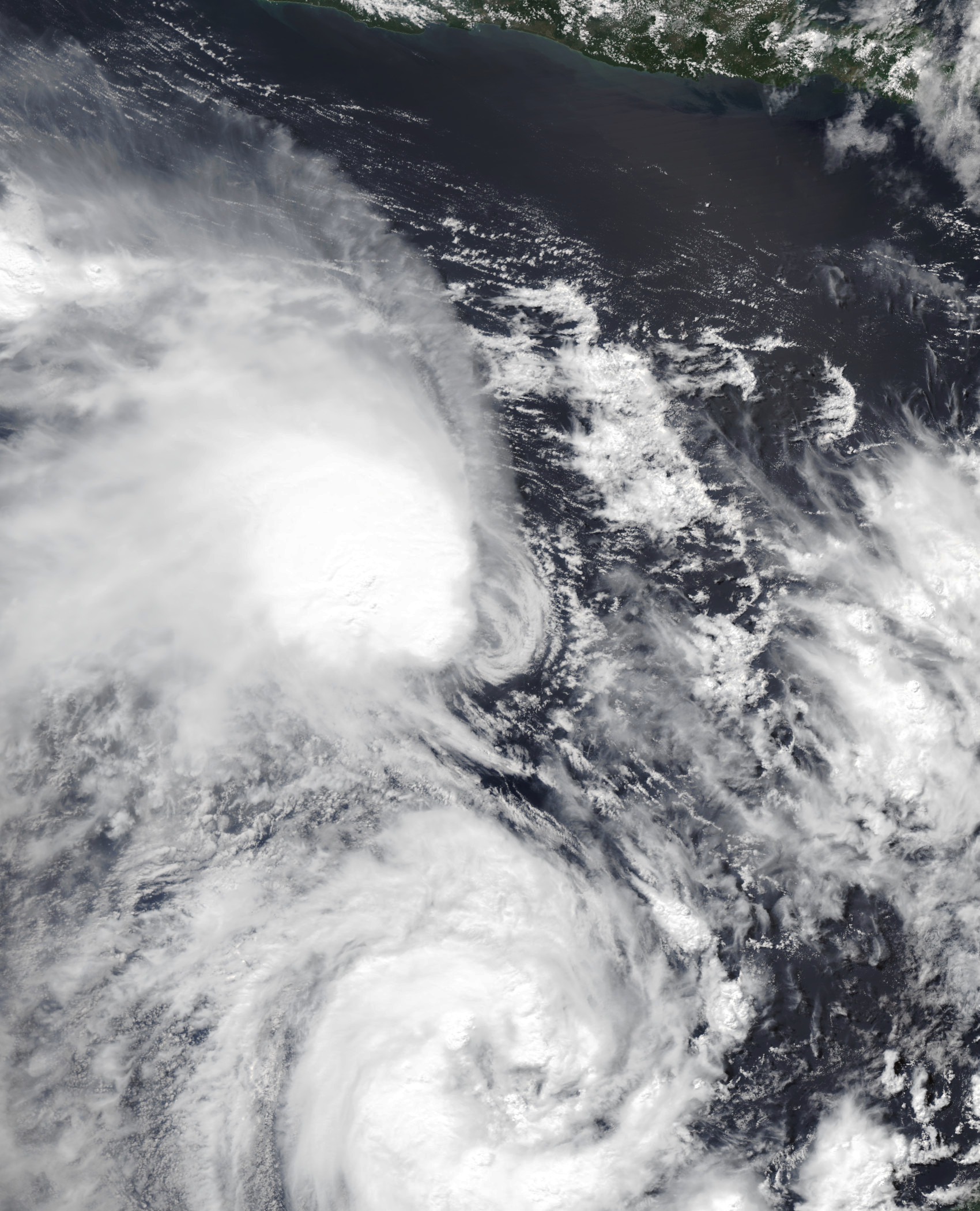
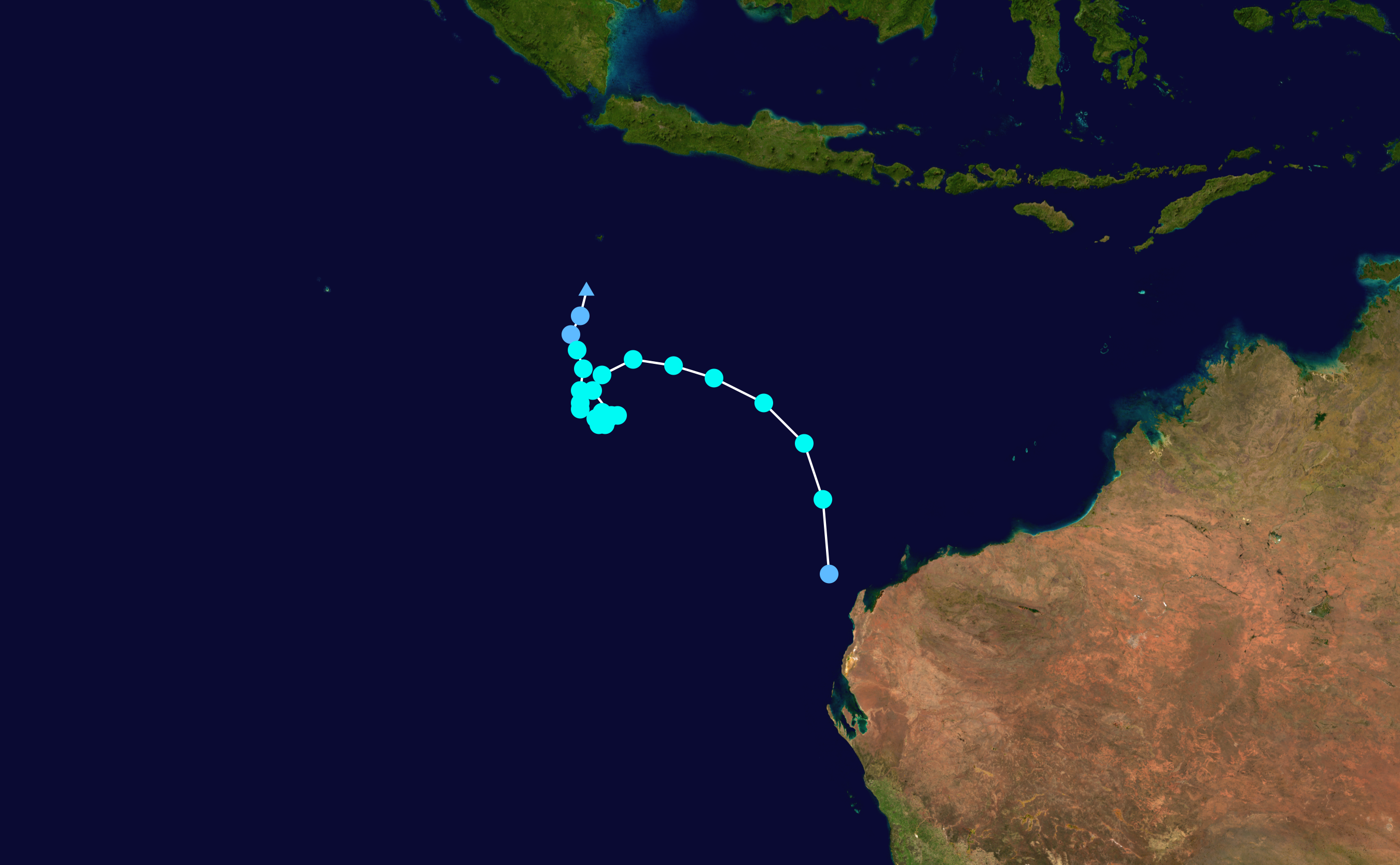
- Duration: 3 April – 10 April
- Peak intensity: 95 km/h (60 mph) (10-min); 986 hPa (mbar)

A well-defined and slow-moving tropical low, 23U, formed near Christmas Island on 3 April, on the same day where a trough spawned another system in the Northern Region near Timor. It caused some sporadic rain showers on the island. On 8 April, the system began interacting with Cyclone Seroja to the northeast, due to the Fujiwhara effect, causing both systems to weaken, though the tropical low subsequently strengthened into Tropical Cyclone Odette later that day. On 9 April, Odette began to weaken, as the storm was gradually absorbed into Seroja, which was strengthening around the same time. On 10 April, Odette had lost most of its convection, and the storm began to be drawn into Seroja's circulation. During this time, Odette weakened further into a tropical low. Later that day, Odette was fully absorbed into Seroja, and the BoM issued their final advisory on the storm.

=== Tropical Low 24U ===
- Tropical low (Australian scale)
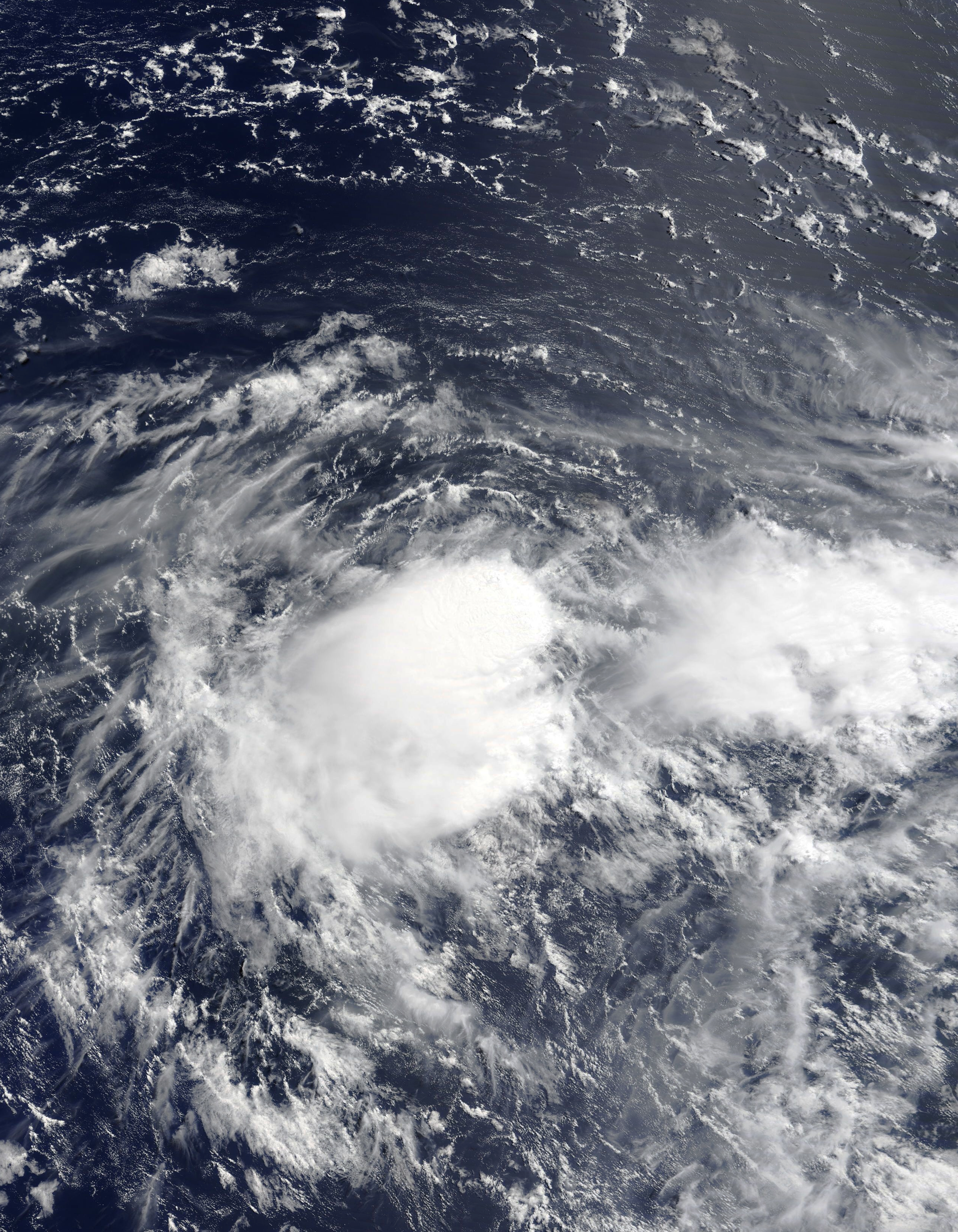
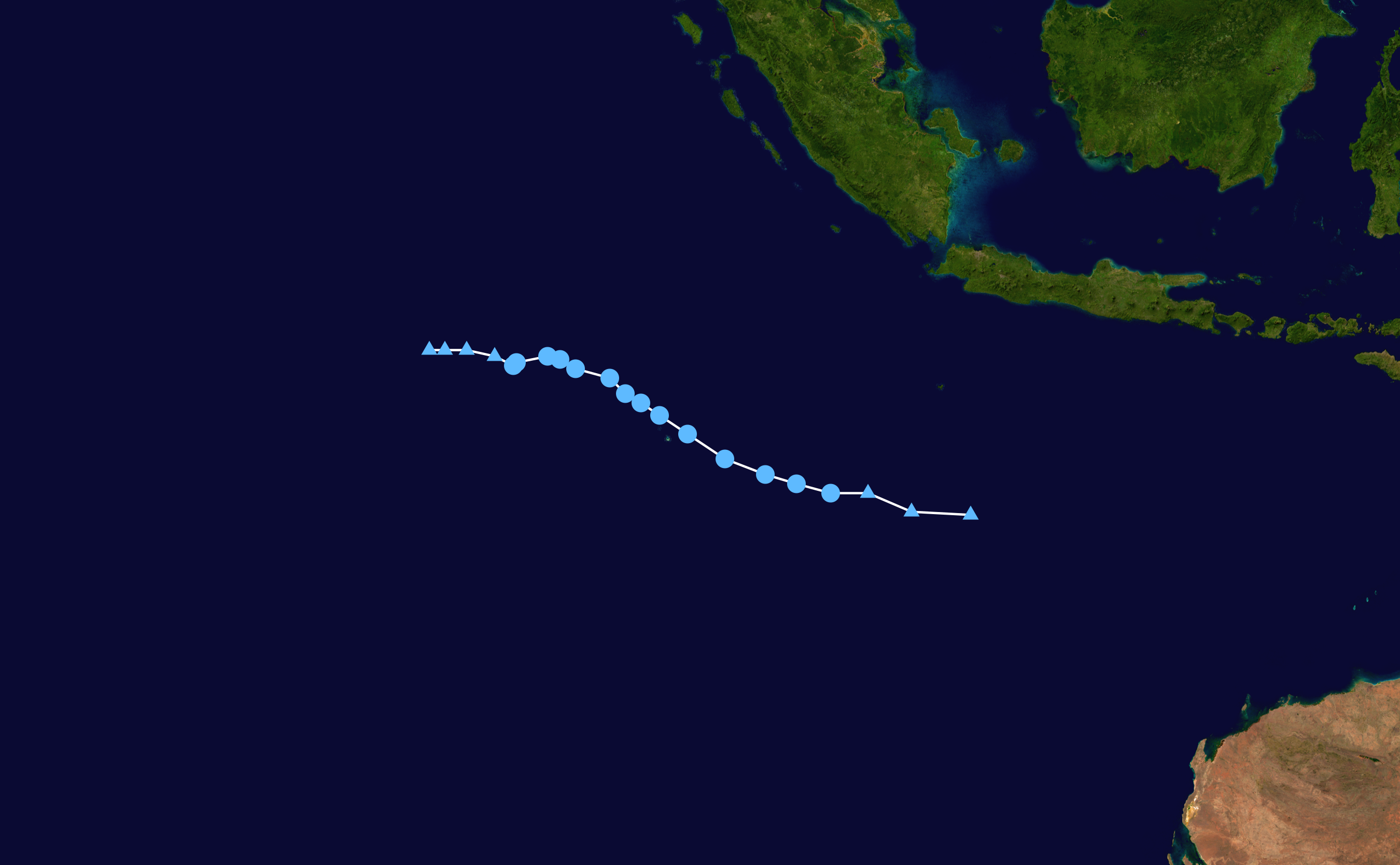
- Duration: 6 April – 11 April
- Peak intensity: 65 km/h (40 mph) (10-min); 1000 hPa (mbar)

An active phase of Madden–Julian oscillation spawned a tropical low in the central Indian Ocean, northwest of the Cocos Islands on 6 April. Moving east-southeastwards, the system gradually organized; it eventually attained gale-force winds in the southwest portion of the system on 9 April. However, the Bureau of Meteorology didn't classify the system as a Category 1 tropical cyclone as these winds did not extend more than halfway around the centre of the low. Also that day, 24U passed to the south of the islands, causing little impacts. As the storm neared the proximity of restrengthening Cyclone Odette, the system started to weaken, dissipating on 11 April.

== Storm names ==
=== Bureau of Meteorology ===
The Australian Bureau of Meteorology Tropical Cyclone Warning Centre (Australian TCWC) monitors all tropical cyclones that form within the Australian region, including any within the areas of responsibility of TCWC Jakarta or TCWC Port Moresby. Should a tropical low reach tropical cyclone strength within the Australian TCWC's area of responsibility, it will be assigned the next name from the following naming list. The names that were used for 2020–21 season are listed below:

- Imogen
- Joshua
- Kimi
- Lucas
- Marian
- Niran
- Odette

=== TCWC Jakarta ===
The tropical cyclone warning centre in Jakarta monitors tropical cyclones from the Equator to 11°S, between the longitudes 90°E and 145°E. Should a tropical depression reach tropical cyclone strength within TCWC Jakarta's area of responsibility, it will be assigned the next name from the following list: The name that was used for 2020–21 season is listed below:

- Seroja

=== TCWC Port Moresby ===
Tropical cyclones that develop between the Equator and 11°S, between the longitudes 151°E and 160°E, are assigned names by the tropical cyclone warning centre in Port Moresby, Papua New Guinea. Tropical cyclone formation in this area is rare, and no cyclones have been named in it since 2007. As names are assigned in a random order, the whole list is shown below:

- Alu (unused)
- Buri (unused)
- Dodo (unused)
- Emau (unused)
- Fere (unused)
- Hibu (unused)
- Ila (unused)
- Kama (unused)
- Lobu (unused)
- Maila (unused)

== Season effects ==
2020–21 Australian region cyclone season
Name	Dates active	Peak intensity			Areas affected	Damage (US$)	Deaths	Refs
Name	Dates active	Category	Wind speed	Pressure	Areas affected	Damage (US$)	Deaths	Refs
Bongoyo	November 24 – 30	Tropical low	Not specified	Not specified	None	None	None	
02U	December 5 – 12	Tropical low	75 km/h (45 mph)	992 hPa (29.29 inHg)	Western Australia	Unknown	None	
03U	December 18 – 23	Tropical low	Not specified	995 hPa (29.38 inHg)	Northern Territory, Kimberley	Unknown	None	
04U	December 20 – 28	Tropical low	Not specified	1003 hPa (29.62 inHg)	Cocos Islands	Unknown	None	
Imogen	January 1 – 6	Category 2 tropical cyclone	95 km/h (60 mph)	985 hPa (29.09 inHg)	Northern Territory, Queensland	>$10 million	None	
06U	January 5 – 10	Tropical low	65 km/h (40 mph)	999 hPa (29.50 inHg)	None	None	None	
Joshua	January 13 – 17	Category 1 tropical cyclone	85 km/h (50 mph)	990 hPa (29.23 inHg)	Cocos Islands	Unknown	None	
08U	January 18 – 23	Tropical low	65 km/h (40 mph)	994 hPa (29.35 inHg)	Northern Territory, Western Australia	Unknown	None	
Kimi	January 18 – 23	Category 1 tropical cyclone	85 km/h (50 mph)	990 hPa (29.23 inHg)	Queensland	Minimal	None	
10U	January 19 – 27	Tropical low	75 km/h (45 mph)	994 hPa (29.35 inHg)	Cocos Islands	Unknown	None	
Lucas	January 24 – February 1	Category 2 tropical cyclone	95 km/h (60 mph)	985 hPa (29.09 inHg)	Queensland, New Caledonia	Unknown	None	
12U	January 28 – February 8	Tropical low	65 km/h (40 mph)	990 hPa (29.23 inHg)	Western Australia	Unknown	None	
13U	February 6 – 8	Tropical low	Not specified	996 hPa (29.41 inHg)	Northern Territory	None	None	
Marian	February 21 – March 9	Category 3 severe tropical cyclone	165 km/h (105 mph)	951 hPa (28.08 inHg)	Cocos Island	Unknown	Unknown	
Niran	February 27 – March 6	Category 5 severe tropical cyclone	205 km/h (125 mph)	936 hPa (27.64 inHg)	Queensland, New Caledonia	$250 million	Unknown	
21U	March 20 – 26	Tropical low	65 km/h (40 mph)	1000 hPa (29.53 inHg)	Cocos Islands	None	None	
Seroja	April 3 – 12	Category 3 severe tropical cyclone	120 km/h (75 mph)	967 hPa (28.56 inHg)	East Timor, Indonesia, Western Australia	$491 million	271	
Odette	April 3 – 10	Category 2 tropical cyclone	95 km/h (60 mph)	986 hPa (29.12 inHg)	Western Australia	None	None	
24U	April 6 – 11	Tropical low	65 km/h (40 mph)	1000 hPa (29.53 inHg)	None	None	None	
Season aggregates
19 systems	November 24, 2020 – April 12, 2021		205 km/h (125 mph)	936 hPa (27.64 inHg)		$751 million	271	

== See also ==
- Weather of 2020 and 2021
- List of Southern Hemisphere tropical cyclone seasons
- Tropical cyclones in 2020, 2021
- Atlantic hurricane seasons: 2020, 2021
- Pacific hurricane seasons: 2020, 2021
- Pacific typhoon seasons: 2020, 2021
- North Indian Ocean cyclone seasons: 2020, 2021
- 2020–21 South-West Indian Ocean cyclone season
- 2020–21 South Pacific cyclone season
