= List of airports by IATA code: E =

The DST column shows the months in which Daylight Saving Time, a.k.a. Summer Time, begins and ends. A blank DST box usually indicates that the location stays on Standard Time all year, although in some cases the location stays on Summer Time all year. If a location is currently on DST, add one hour to the time in the Time column.

IATA	ICAO	Airport name	Location served	Time	DST
-EA-
EAA	PAEG	Eagle Airport	Eagle, Alaska, United States	UTC−09:00	Mar-Nov
EAB	ODAS	Abbs Airport	Abbs, Yemen	UTC+03:00	
EAE	NVSE	Siwo Airport	Emae Island, Shefa, Vanuatu	UTC+11:00	
EAL		Elenak Airport	Mejato Island, Kwajalein Atoll, Marshall Islands	UTC+12:00	
EAM	OENG	Najran Domestic Airport	Najran, Saudi Arabia	UTC+03:00	
EAN	KEAN	Phifer Airfield	Wheatland, Wyoming, United States	UTC−07:00	Mar-Nov
EAP		metropolitan area^{2}	Basel, Switzerland / Mulhouse, Alsace, France	UTC+01:00	Mar-Oct
EAR	KEAR	Kearney Regional Airport	Kearney, Nebraska, United States	UTC−06:00	Mar-Nov
EAS	LESO	San Sebastián Airport	San Sebastián, Basque Country, Spain	UTC+01:00	Mar-Oct
EAT	KEAT	Pangborn Memorial Airport	Wenatchee, Washington, United States	UTC−08:00	Mar-Nov
EAU	KEAU	Chippewa Valley Regional Airport	Eau Claire, Wisconsin, United States	UTC−06:00	Mar-Nov
-EB-
EBA	LIRJ	Marina di Campo Airport	Elba Island, Tuscany, Italy	UTC+01:00	Mar-Oct
EBB	HUEN	Entebbe International Airport	Entebbe, Uganda	UTC+03:00	
EBD	HSOB	El Obeid Airport	El Obeid, Sudan	UTC+03:00	
EBG	SKEB	El Bagre Airport (El Tomin Airport)	El Bagre, Colombia	UTC−05:00	
EBH	DAOY	El Bayadh Airport	El Bayadh, Algeria	UTC+01:00	
EBJ	EKEB	Esbjerg Airport	Esbjerg, Denmark	UTC+01:00	Mar-Oct
EBL	ORER	Erbil International Airport	Erbil, Iraqi Kurdistan	UTC+03:00	
EBM	DTTR	El Borma Airport	El Borma, Tunisia	UTC+01:00	
EBN		Ebadon Airstrip	Ebadon Island, Kwajalein Atoll, Marshall Islands	UTC+12:00	
EBO		Ebon Airport	Ebon Atoll, Marshall Islands	UTC+12:00	
EBS	KEBS	Webster City Municipal Airport	Webster City, Iowa, United States	UTC−06:00	Mar-Nov
EBU	LFMH	Saint-Étienne–Bouthéon Airport	Saint-Étienne, Rhône-Alpes, France	UTC+01:00	Mar-Oct
EBW	FKKW	Ebolowa Airport	Ebolowa, Cameroon	UTC+01:00	
-EC-
ECA		Iosco County Airport (FAA: 6D9)	East Tawas, Michigan, United States	UTC−05:00	Mar-Nov
ECG	KECG	Elizabeth City Regional Airport	Elizabeth City, North Carolina, United States	UTC−05:00	Mar-Nov
ECH	YECH	Echuca Airport	Echuca, Victoria, Australia	UTC+10:00	Oct-Apr
ECI	MNLP	Costa Esmeralda Airport	Rivas, Nicaragua	UTC−06:00	
ECN	LCEN	Ercan International Airport	Nicosia (Lefkoşa), Northern Cyprus	UTC+03:00	
ECO		El Encanto Airport	El Encanto, Colombia	UTC−05:00	
ECP	KECP	Northwest Florida Beaches International Airport	Panama City, Florida, United States	UTC−06:00	Mar-Nov
ECR	SKEH	El Charco Airport	El Charco, Colombia	UTC−05:00	
ECS	KECS	Mondell Field	Newcastle, Wyoming, United States	UTC−07:00	Mar-Nov
-ED-
EDA		Edna Bay Seaplane Base	Edna Bay, Alaska, United States	UTC−09:00	Mar-Nov
EDB	HSDB	El Debba Airport	El Debba, Sudan	UTC+03:00	
EDD		Erldunda Airport	Erldunda, Northern Territory, Australia	UTC+09:30	
EDE	KEDE	Northeastern Regional Airport	Edenton, North Carolina, United States	UTC−05:00	Mar-Nov
EDF	PAED	Elmendorf Air Force Base	Anchorage, Alaska, United States	UTC−09:00	Mar-Nov
EDI	EGPH	Edinburgh Airport	Edinburgh, Scotland, United Kingdom	UTC±00:00	Mar-Oct
EDK	KEQA	Captain Jack Thomas/El Dorado Airport (FAA: EQA)	El Dorado, Kansas, United States	UTC−06:00	Mar-Nov
EDL	HKEL	Eldoret International Airport	Eldoret, Kenya	UTC+03:00	
EDM	LFRI	La Roche-sur-Yon Aerodrome	La Roche-sur-Yon, Pays de la Loire, France	UTC+01:00	Mar-Oct
EDO	LTFD	Balıkesir Koca Seyit Airport	Edremit, Turkey	UTC+03:00	
EDQ		Erandique Airport	Erandique, Honduras	UTC−06:00	
EDR	YPMP	Edward River Airport	Pormpuraaw, Queensland, Australia	UTC+10:00	
EDW	KEDW	Edwards Air Force Base	Edwards, California, United States	UTC−08:00	Mar-Nov
-EE-
EEA	SNCP	Planalto Serrano Regional Airport	Correia Pinto, Santa Catarina, Brazil	UTC−03:00	
EED	KEED	Needles Airport	Needles, California, United States	UTC−08:00	Mar-Nov
EEK	PAEE	Eek Airport	Eek, Alaska, United States	UTC−09:00	Mar-Nov
EEN	KEEN	Dillant–Hopkins Airport	Keene, New Hampshire, United States	UTC−05:00	Mar-Nov
-EF-
EFD	KEFD	Ellington Field	Houston, Texas, United States	UTC−06:00	Mar-Nov
EFG	AYEF	Efogi Airport	Efogi, Papua New Guinea	UTC+10:00	
EFK	KEFK	Newport State Airport	Newport, Vermont, United States	UTC−05:00	Mar-Nov
EFL	LGKF	Cephalonia International Airport	Cephalonia, Greece	UTC+02:00	Mar-Oct
EFW	KEFW	Jefferson Municipal Airport	Jefferson, Iowa, United States	UTC−06:00	Mar-Nov
-EG-
EGA	AYEN	Engati Airport	Engati, Papua New Guinea	UTC+10:00	
EGC	LFBE	Bergerac Dordogne Périgord Airport	Bergerac, Aquitaine, France	UTC+01:00	Mar-Oct
EGE	KEGE	Eagle County Regional Airport	Eagle / Vail, Colorado, United States	UTC−07:00	Mar-Nov
EGI	KEGI	Duke Field (Eglin Auxiliary Field 3)	Crestview, Florida, United States	UTC−06:00	Mar-Nov
EGL	HANG	Neghelle Airport	Neghelle, Ethiopia	UTC+03:00	
EGM	AGGS	Seghe Airport	Seghe, Western Province, Solomon Islands	UTC+11:00	
EGN	HSGN	Geneina Airport	Geneina, Sudan	UTC+03:00	
EGO	UUOB	Belgorod International Airport	Belgorod, Belgorod Oblast, Russia	UTC+03:00	
EGP		Maverick County Memorial International Airport	Eagle Pass, Texas, United States	UTC−06:00	Mar-Nov
EGS	BIEG	Egilsstaðir Airport	Egilsstaðir, Iceland	UTC±00:00	
EGV	KEGV	Eagle River Union Airport	Eagle River, Wisconsin, United States	UTC−06:00	Mar-Nov
EGX	PAII	Egegik Airport (FAA: EII)	Egegik, Alaska, United States	UTC−09:00	Mar-Nov
-EH-
EHL	SAVB	El Bolsón Airport	El Bolsón, Río Negro, Argentina	UTC−03:00	
EHM	PAEH	Cape Newenham LRRS Airport	Cape Newenham, Alaska, United States	UTC−09:00	Mar-Nov
EHU	ZHEC	Ezhou Huahu Airport	Echeng District, Ezhou, Hubei, China	UTC+08:00	
-EI-
EIA		Popondetta Airport	Eia, Papua New Guinea	UTC+10:00	
EIB	EDGE	Eisenach-Kindel Airport	Eisenach, Thuringia, Germany	UTC+01:00	Mar-Oct
EIE	UNII	Yeniseysk Airport	Yeniseysk, Krasnoyarsk Krai, Russia	UTC+07:00	
EIH		Einasleigh Airport	Einasleigh, Queensland, Australia	UTC+10:00	
EIK	URKE	Yeysk Airport	Yeysk, Krasnodar Krai, Russia	UTC+03:00	
EIL	PAEI	Eielson Air Force Base	Fairbanks, Alaska, United States	UTC−09:00	Mar-Nov
EIN	EHEH	Eindhoven Airport	Eindhoven, Netherlands	UTC+01:00	Mar-Oct
EIS	TUPJ	Terrance B. Lettsome International Airport	Tortola, British Overseas Territory of Virgin Islands	UTC−04:00	
EIY	LLEY	Ein Yahav Airfield	Ein Yahav, Israel	UTC+02:00	Mar-Oct
-EJ-
EJA	SKEJ	Yariguíes Airport	Barrancabermeja, Colombia	UTC−05:00	
EJH	OEWJ	Al Wajh Domestic Airport	Al Wajh, Saudi Arabia	UTC+03:00	
EJN		Ejin Banner Taolai Airport	Ejin Banner, Inner Mongolia, China	UTC+08:00	
EJT		Enejit Airport	Enejit, Mili Atoll, Marshall Islands	UTC+12:00	
-EK-
EKA	KEKA	Murray Field	Eureka, California, United States	UTC−08:00	Mar-Nov
EKB	UASB	Ekibastuz Airport	Ekibastuz, Kazakhstan	UTC+06:00	
EKD		Elkedra Airport	Elkedra, Northern Territory, Australia	UTC+09:30	
EKE		Ekereku Airport	Ekereku, Guyana	UTC−04:00	
EKI	KEKM	Elkhart Municipal Airport (FAA: EKM)	Elkhart, Indiana, United States	UTC−05:00	Mar-Nov
EKN	KEKN	Elkins-Randolph County Airport	Elkins, West Virginia, United States	UTC−05:00	Mar-Nov
EKO	KEKO	Elko Regional Airport	Elko, Nevada, United States	UTC−08:00	Mar-Nov
EKS	UHSK	Shakhtyorsk Airport	Shakhtyorsk, Sakhalin Oblast, Russia	UTC+11:00	
EKT	ESSU	Eskilstuna Airport	Eskilstuna, Sweden	UTC+01:00	Mar-Oct
EKX	KEKX	Elizabethtown Regional Airport (Addington Field)	Elizabethtown, Kentucky, United States	UTC−05:00	Mar-Nov
-EL-
ELA	KELA	Eagle Lake Airport	Eagle Lake, Texas, United States	UTC−06:00	Mar-Nov
ELB	SKBC	Las Flores Airport	El Banco, Colombia	UTC−05:00	
ELC	YELD	Elcho Island Airport	Elcho Island, Northern Territory, Australia	UTC+09:30	
ELD	KELD	South Arkansas Regional Airport at Goodwin Field	El Dorado, Arkansas, United States	UTC−06:00	Mar-Nov
ELE		El Real Airport	El Real, Panama	UTC−05:00	
ELF	HSFS	El Fasher Airport	El Fasher, Sudan	UTC+03:00	
ELG	DAUE	El Golea Airport	El Goléa, Algeria	UTC+01:00	
ELH	MYEH	North Eleuthera Airport	North Eleuthera, Eleuthera Island, Bahamas	UTC−05:00	Mar-Nov
ELI	PFEL	Elim Airport	Elim, Alaska, United States	UTC−09:00	Mar-Nov
ELJ	SVWX	El Recreo Airport	El Recreo, Colombia	UTC−05:00	
ELK	KELK	Elk City Regional Business Airport	Elk City, Oklahoma, United States	UTC−06:00	Mar-Nov
ELL	FAER	Ellisras Airport	Ellisras, South Africa	UTC+02:00	
ELM	KELM	Elmira/Corning Regional Airport	Elmira / Corning, New York, United States	UTC−05:00	Mar-Nov
ELN	KELN	Bowers Field	Ellensburg, Washington, United States	UTC−08:00	Mar-Nov
ELO	SATD	Eldorado Airport	Eldorado, Misiones, Argentina	UTC−03:00	
ELP	KELP	El Paso International Airport	El Paso, Texas, United States	UTC−07:00	Mar-Nov
ELQ	OEGS	Prince Nayef bin Abdulaziz Regional Airport	Buraidah, Saudi Arabia	UTC+03:00	
ELR		Elelim Airport	Elelim, Indonesia	UTC+09:00	
ELS	FAEL	East London Airport	East London, South Africa	UTC+02:00	
ELT	HETR	El Tor Airport	El Tor, Egypt	UTC+02:00	
ELU	DAUO	Guemar Airport	El Oued, Algeria	UTC+01:00	
ELV	PAEL	Elfin Cove Seaplane Base	Elfin Cove, Alaska, United States	UTC−09:00	Mar-Nov
ELW		Ellamar Seaplane Base (FAA: 1Z9)	Ellamar, Alaska, United States	UTC−09:00	Mar-Nov
ELX		El Tigre Airport	El Tigre, Venezuela	UTC−04:00	
ELY	KELY	Ely Airport	Ely, Nevada, United States	UTC−08:00	Mar-Nov
ELZ	KELZ	Wellsville Municipal Airport (Tarantine Field)	Wellsville, New York, United States	UTC−05:00	Mar-Nov
-EM-
EMA	EGNX	East Midlands Airport	Nottingham / Leicester / Derby, England, United Kingdom	UTC±00:00	Mar-Oct
EMD	YEML	Emerald Airport	Emerald, Queensland, Australia	UTC+10:00	
EME	EDWE	Emden Airport	Emden, Lower Saxony, Germany	UTC+01:00	Mar-Oct
EMG	FAEM	Empangeni Airport	Empangeni, South Africa	UTC+02:00	
EMI	AYEE	Emirau Airport	Emirau Island, Papua New Guinea	UTC+10:00	
EMK	PAEM	Emmonak Airport (FAA: ENM)	Emmonak, Alaska, United States	UTC−09:00	Mar-Nov
EML	LSME	Emmen Air Base	Emmen, Switzerland	UTC+01:00	Mar-Oct
EMM	KEMM	Kemmerer Municipal Airport	Kemmerer, Wyoming, United States	UTC−07:00	Mar-Nov
EMN	GQNI	Néma Airport	Néma, Mauritania	UTC±00:00	
EMO	AYEO	Emo Airport	Emo, Papua New Guinea	UTC+10:00	
EMP	KEMP	Emporia Municipal Airport	Emporia, Kansas, United States	UTC−06:00	Mar-Nov
EMS	AYEB	Embessa Airport	Embessa, Papua New Guinea	UTC+10:00	
EMT	KEMT	San Gabriel Valley Airport	El Monte, California, United States	UTC−08:00	Mar-Nov
EMX	SAVD	El Maitén Airport	El Maitén, Chubut, Argentina	UTC−03:00	
EMY	HEMN	El Minya Airport	El Minya, Egypt	UTC+02:00	
-EN-
ENA	PAEN	Kenai Municipal Airport	Kenai, Alaska, United States	UTC−09:00	Mar-Nov
ENB	YEEB	Eneabba Airport	Eneabba, Western Australia, Australia	UTC+08:00	
ENC	LFSN	Nancy-Essey Airport	Nancy, Lorraine, France	UTC+01:00	Mar-Oct
END	KEND	Vance Air Force Base	Enid, Oklahoma, United States	UTC−06:00	Mar-Nov
ENE	WATE	H. Hasan Aroeboesman Airport	Ende, Indonesia	UTC+08:00	
ENF	EFET	Enontekiö Airport	Enontekiö, Finland	UTC+02:00	Mar-Oct
ENH	ZHES	Enshi Xujiaping Airport	Enshi, Hubei, China	UTC+08:00	
ENI	RPEN	El Nido Airport	El Nido, Philippines	UTC+08:00	
ENJ		El Naranjo Airport	El Naranjo, Guatemala	UTC−06:00	
ENK	EGAB	Enniskillen/St Angelo Airport	Enniskillen, Northern Ireland, United Kingdom	UTC±00:00	Mar-Oct
ENL	KENL	Centralia Municipal Airport	Centralia, Illinois, United States	UTC−06:00	Mar-Nov
ENN	PANN	Nenana Municipal Airport	Nenana, Alaska, United States	UTC−09:00	Mar-Nov
ENO	SGEN	Teniente Amin Ayub Gonzalez Airport	Encarnacion, Paraguay	UTC−04:00	Oct-Mar
ENS	EHTW	Enschede Airport Twente	Enschede, Netherlands	UTC+01:00	Mar-Oct
ENT	PKMA	Enewetak Auxiliary Airfield	Enewetak, Marshall Islands	UTC+12:00	
ENU	DNEN	Akanu Ibiam International Airport	Enugu, Nigeria	UTC+01:00	
ENV	KENV	Wendover Airport	Wendover, Utah, United States	UTC−07:00	Mar-Nov
ENW	KENW	Kenosha Regional Airport	Kenosha, Wisconsin, United States	UTC−06:00	Mar-Nov
ENY	ZLYA	Yan'an Nanniwan Airport	Yan'an, Shaanxi, China	UTC+08:00	
-EO-
EOH	SKMD	Olaya Herrera Airport	Medellín, Colombia	UTC−05:00	
EOI	EGED	Eday Airport	Eday, Scotland, United Kingdom	UTC±00:00	Mar-Oct
EOK	KEOK	Keokuk Municipal Airport	Keokuk, Iowa, United States	UTC−06:00	Mar-Nov
EOR	SVED	El Dorado Airport	El Dorado, Venezuela	UTC−04:00	
EOS	KEOS	Neosho Hugh Robinson Airport	Neosho, Missouri, United States	UTC−06:00	Mar-Nov
EOZ	SVEZ	Elorza Airport	Elorza, Venezuela	UTC−04:00	
-EP-
EPA	SADP	El Palomar Airport	El Palomar, Buenos Aires, Argentina	UTC−03:00	
EPG		Browns Airport (FAA: NE69)	Weeping Water, Nebraska, United States	UTC−06:00	Mar-Nov
EPH	KEPH	Ephrata Municipal Airport	Ephrata, Washington, United States	UTC−08:00	Mar-Nov
EPL	LFSG	Épinal – Mirecourt Airport	Épinal / Mirecourt, Lorraine, France	UTC+01:00	Mar-Oct
EPN		Epéna Airport	Epéna, Republic of the Congo	UTC+01:00	
EPR	YESP	Esperance Airport	Esperance, Western Australia, Australia	UTC+08:00	
EPS	MDAB	Arroyo Barril Airport	Samaná, Dominican Republic	UTC−04:00	
EPT	AYEL	Eliptamin Airport	Eliptamin, Papua New Guinea	UTC+10:00	
EPU	EEPU	Pärnu Airport	Pärnu, Estonia	UTC+02:00	Mar-Oct
-EQ-
EQS	SAVE	Esquel Airport	Esquel, Chubut, Argentina	UTC−03:00	
-ER-
ERA	HCMU	Erigavo Airport	Erigavo, Somalia	UTC+03:00	
ERB	YERN	Pukatja Airport (Ernabella Airport)	Pukatja, South Australia, Australia	UTC+09:30	Oct-Apr
ERC	LTCD	Erzincan Airport	Erzincan, Turkey	UTC+03:00	
ERD	UKDB	Berdiansk Airport	Berdiansk, Ukraine	UTC+02:00	Mar-Oct
ERE	AYEV	Erave Airport	Erave, Papua New Guinea	UTC+10:00	
ERF	EDDE	Erfurt–Weimar Airport	Erfurt, Thuringia, Germany	UTC+01:00	Mar-Oct
ERG	UIKE	Erbogachen Airport	Yerbogachen, Irkutsk Oblast, Russia	UTC+08:00	
ERH	GMFK	Moulay Ali Cherif Airport	Errachidia, Morocco	UTC±00:00	Mar-Oct^{1}
ERI	KERI	Erie International Airport (Tom Ridge Field)	Erie, Pennsylvania, United States	UTC−05:00	Mar-Nov
ERL	ZBER	Erenhot Saiwusu International Airport	Erenhot, Inner Mongolia, China	UTC+08:00	
ERM	SSER	Erechim Airport	Erechim, Rio Grande do Sul, Brazil	UTC−03:00	
ERN	SWEI	Eirunepé Airport (Amaury Feitosa Tomaz Airport)	Eirunepé, Amazonas, Brazil	UTC−05:00	
ERQ	YESE	Elrose Airport	Eloise Copper Mine, Queensland, Australia	UTC+10:00	
ERR	KERR	Errol Airport	Errol, New Hampshire, United States	UTC−05:00	Mar-Nov
ERS	FYWE	Eros Airport	Windhoek, Namibia	UTC+01:00	Sep-Apr
ERT		Erdenet Airport	Erdenet, Mongolia	UTC+08:00	
ERU	AYER	Erume Airport	Erume, Papua New Guinea	UTC+10:00	
ERV	KERV	Kerrville Municipal Airport (Louis Schreiner Field)	Kerrville, Texas, United States	UTC−06:00	Mar-Nov
ERZ	LTCE	Erzurum Airport	Erzurum, Turkey	UTC+03:00	
-ES-
ESA		Esa'ala Airport	Esa'ala, Papua New Guinea	UTC+10:00	
ESB	LTAC	Esenboğa International Airport	Ankara, Turkey	UTC+03:00	
ESC	KESC	Delta County Airport	Escanaba, Michigan, United States	UTC−05:00	Mar-Nov
ESD	KORS	Orcas Island Airport (FAA: ORS)	Eastsound, Washington, United States	UTC−08:00	Mar-Nov
ESE	MMES	Ensenada Airport	Ensenada, Baja California, Mexico	UTC−08:00	Apr-Oct
ESF	KESF	Esler Airfield (Esler Regional Airport)	Alexandria, Louisiana, United States	UTC−06:00	Mar-Nov
ESG	SGME	Dr. Luis María Argaña International Airport	Mariscal Estigarribia, Paraguay	UTC−04:00	Oct-Mar
ESH	EGKA	Shoreham Airport (Brighton City Airport)	Shoreham-by-Sea, England, United Kingdom	UTC±00:00	Mar-Oct
ESI		Espinosa Airport	Espinosa, Minas Gerais, Brazil	UTC−03:00	
ESK	LTBI	Eskişehir Airport	Eskişehir, Turkey	UTC+03:00	
ESL	URWI	Elista Airport	Elista, Kalmykia, Russia	UTC+03:00	
ESM	SETN	Carlos Concha Torres International Airport	Esmeraldas, Ecuador	UTC−05:00	
ESN	KESN	Easton Airport (Newnam Field)	Easton, Maryland, United States	UTC−05:00	Mar-Nov
ESO		Ohkay Owingeh Airport (FAA: E14)	Española, New Mexico, United States	UTC−07:00	Mar-Nov
ESP		Stroudsburg–Pocono Airport (FAA: N53)	East Stroudsburg, Pennsylvania, United States	UTC−05:00	Mar-Nov
ESR	SCES	Ricardo García Posada Airport	El Salvador, Chile	UTC−04:00	Aug-May
ESS	EDLE	Essen/Mülheim Airport	Essen, North Rhine-Westphalia, Germany	UTC+01:00	Mar-Oct
EST	KEST	Estherville Municipal Airport	Estherville, Iowa, United States	UTC−06:00	Mar-Nov
ESU	GMMI	Essaouira-Mogador Airport	Essaouira, Morocco	UTC±00:00	Mar-Oct^{1}
ESW	KESW	Easton State Airport	Easton, Washington, United States	UTC−08:00	Mar-Nov
-ET-
ETB	KETB	West Bend Municipal Airport	West Bend, Wisconsin, United States	UTC−06:00	Mar-Nov
ETD	YEDA	Etadunna Airport	Etadunna, South Australia, Australia	UTC+09:30	Oct-Apr
ETE	HAMM	Genda Wuha Airport	Metemma, Ethiopia	UTC+03:00	
ETH	LLET	J. Hozman Airport	Eilat, Israel	UTC+02:00	Mar-Oct
ETM	LLER	Ramon Airport	Eilat, Israel	UTC+02:00	Mar-Oct
ETN	KETN	Eastland Municipal Airport	Eastland, Texas, United States	UTC−06:00	Mar-Nov
ETR	SERO	Santa Rosa International Airport	Santa Rosa, Ecuador	UTC−05:00	
ETS	KEDN	Enterprise Municipal Airport (FAA: EDN)	Enterprise, Alabama, United States	UTC−06:00	Mar-Nov
ETZ	LFJL	Metz–Nancy–Lorraine Airport	Metz / Nancy, Lorraine, France	UTC+01:00	Mar-Oct
-EU-
EUA	NFTE	Eua Airport (Kaufana Airport)	Eua, Tonga	UTC+13:00	Nov-Jan
EUC	YECL	Eucla Airport	Eucla, Western Australia, Australia	UTC+08:00	
EUE		Eureka Airport (FAA: 05U)	Eureka, Nevada, United States	UTC−08:00	Mar-Nov
EUF	KEUF	Weedon Field	Eufaula, Alabama, United States	UTC−06:00	Mar-Nov
EUG	KEUG	Eugene Airport (Mahlon Sweet Airport)	Eugene, Oregon, United States	UTC−08:00	Mar-Nov
EUM	EDHN	Neumünster Airport	Neumünster, Schleswig-Holstein, Germany	UTC+01:00	Mar-Oct
EUN	GMML	Hassan I Airport	Laayoune, Morocco	UTC±00:00	Mar-Oct^{1}
EUO		Paratebueno Airport	Paratebueno, Colombia	UTC−05:00	
EUQ	RPVS	Evelio Javier Airport (Antique Airport)	San Jose de Buenavista, Philippines	UTC+08:00	
EUX	TNCE	F. D. Roosevelt Airport	Oranjestad, Sint Eustatius, Caribbean Netherlands	UTC−04:00	
-EV-
EVA		Ben Bruce Memorial Airpark (FAA: 4TE8)	Evadale, Texas, United States	UTC−06:00	Mar-Nov
EVD		Eva Downs Airport	Eva Downs, Northern Territory, Australia	UTC+09:30	
EVE	ENEV	Harstad/Narvik Airport, Evenes	Harstad / Narvik, Norway	UTC+01:00	Mar-Oct
EVG	ESND	Sveg Airport	Sveg, Sweden	UTC+01:00	Mar-Oct
EVH	YEVD	Evans Head Memorial Aerodrome	Evans Head, New South Wales, Australia	UTC+10:00	Oct-Apr
EVM	KEVM	Eveleth-Virginia Municipal Airport	Eveleth, Minnesota, United States	UTC−06:00	Mar-Nov
EVN	UDYZ	Zvartnots International Airport	Yerevan, Armenia	UTC+04:00	
EVV	KEVV	Evansville Regional Airport	Evansville, Indiana, United States	UTC−06:00	Mar-Nov
EVW	KEVW	Evanston-Uinta County Burns Field	Evanston, Wyoming, United States	UTC−07:00	Mar-Nov
EVX	LFOE	Évreux-Fauville Air Base	Évreux, Upper Normandy, France	UTC+01:00	Mar-Oct
-EW-
EWB	KEWB	New Bedford Regional Airport	New Bedford / Fall River, Massachusetts, United States	UTC−05:00	Mar-Nov
EWE	WAKG	Ewer Airport	Ewer, Indonesia	UTC+09:00	
EWI	WABT	Enarotali Airport	Enarotali, Indonesia	UTC+09:00	
EWK	KEWK	Newton City/County Airport	Newton, Kansas, United States	UTC−06:00	Mar-Nov
EWN	KEWN	Coastal Carolina Regional Airport	New Bern, North Carolina, United States	UTC−05:00	Mar-Nov
EWO	FCOE	Ewo Airport	Ewo, Republic of the Congo	UTC+01:00	
EWR	KEWR	Newark Liberty International Airport	Newark, New Jersey, United States	UTC−05:00	Mar-Nov
-EX-
EXI		Excursion Inlet Seaplane Base	Excursion Inlet, Alaska, United States	UTC−09:00	Mar-Nov
EXM	YEXM	Exmouth Airport	Exmouth, Western Australia, Australia	UTC+08:00	
EXT	EGTE	Exeter Airport	Exeter, England, United Kingdom	UTC±00:00	Mar-Oct
-EY-
EYK	USHQ	Beloyarsk Airport	Beloyarsky, Khanty-Mansi Autonomous Okrug, Russia	UTC+05:00	
EYL	GAYE	Yélimané Airport	Yélimané, Mali	UTC±00:00	
EYP	SKYP	El Alcaraván Airport	Yopal, Colombia	UTC−05:00	
EYR		Yerington Municipal Airport (FAA: O43)	Yerington, Nevada, United States	UTC−08:00	Mar-Nov
EYS	HKES	Eliye Springs Airport	Eliye Springs, Kenya	UTC+03:00	
EYW	KEYW	Key West International Airport	Key West, Florida, United States	UTC−05:00	Mar-Nov
-EZ-
EZE	SAEZ	Ministro Pistarini International Airport	Buenos Aires, Argentina	UTC−03:00	
EZS	LTCA	Elazığ Airport	Elazığ, Turkey	UTC+03:00	
EZV		Beryozovo Airport	Beryozovo, Khanty-Mansi Autonomous Okrug, Russia	UTC+05:00	

== Notes ==
- ^1 Morocco temporarily suspends DST for the month of Ramadan.
- ^2 EAP is IATA code used for EuroAirport Basel Mulhouse Freiburg (IATA: BSL / MLH).
