= Marion Airport (disambiguation) =

Marion Airport may refer to:

- Marion Airport in Marion, Iowa, United States (FAA: C17)
- Marion Municipal Airport (Indiana) in Marion, Indiana, United States (FAA/IATA: MZZ)
- Marion Municipal Airport (Kansas) in Marion, Kansas, United States (FAA: 43K)
- Marion Municipal Airport (Ohio) in Marion, Ohio, United States (FAA/IATA: MNN)
- Marion-Crittenden County Airport in Marion, Kentucky, United States (FAA: 5M9)

Other airports in places named Marion:

- Mountain Empire Airport in Marion/Wytheville, Virginia, United States (FAA: MKJ)
- Shiflet Field in Marion, North Carolina, USA (FAA:9A9)
- Vaiden Field in Marion, Alabama, USA (FAA: A08)
- Williamson County Regional Airport in Marion, Illinois, United States (FAA/IATA: MWA)

== See also ==
- Marion County Airport (disambiguation)
