= GGI =

GGI may refer to:

== Organisations ==
- Galileo Galilei Institute for Theoretical Physics, near Florence, Italy
- General Glass Industries, a defunct American glassmaker
- Global Governance Institute, a Belgian think tank
- Guardian Girls International, an international NGO

== Other uses ==
- Global Governance Initiative, a diplomatic initiative presesented by CCP General Secretary Xi Jinping
- General Graphics Interface, a former computer graphics project
- Grinnell Regional Airport (FAA LID code), in Iowa, US
- Gullah Gullah Island, an American television series
