= EOK =

EOK may refer to:

- Aero K, ICAO airline code
- Entrepreneurs of Knoxville, an American fraternal service organization
- Estonian Olympic Committee (Estonian: Eesti Olümpiakomitee)
- Hellenic Basketball Federation (Greek: Ελληνική Ομοσπονδία Καλαθοσφαίρισης), the governing body for basketball in Greece
- Keokuk Municipal Airport, in Iowa
- National Organization of Crete (Greek: Εθνική Οργάνωση Κρήτης), a World War II era resistance organization
