= Corning Municipal Airport =

Corning Municipal Airport may refer to:

- Corning Municipal Airport (Arkansas) in Corning, Arkansas, United States (FAA: 4M9)
- Corning Municipal Airport (California) in Corning, California, United States (FAA: 0O4)
- Corning Municipal Airport (Iowa) in Corning, Iowa, United States (FAA: CRZ)

== See also ==
- Corning Airport (disambiguation)
