= Air Race Classic =

Women's American transcontinental air race

The Air Race Classic is an annual transcontinental air race for female pilots. Route lengths are approximately 2,400 statute miles (3,900 km). All flights are conducted in day visual flight rules (VFR) conditions. Each aircraft is handicapped for speed and engine power. The goal is to have the actual ground speed be as far over the handicapped speed as possible.

This women's-only air race started in 1929 as the Women's Air Derby by pilots including Amelia Earhart at the time when female pilots were banned from competing against men. Following the discontinuation of the Powder Puff Derby in 1977, the Air Race Classic was established that same year by a new organization to take its place.

== 2024 Air Race Classic ==
The 2024 race will commence on June 18, departing from KMDH Southern Illinois Airport in Carbondale, IL. This thrilling international competition covers a distance of 2,269 nautical miles, concluding on June 21 at KFNL Northern Colorado Regional Airport in Loveland, CO. Among the contenders, one prominent team commands attention: Team Mach .182, headed by Captain Logan Nissen and Co-Pilot Kelly Hansen. Get ready to witness exhilarating feats of aviation prowess as pilots navigate their way through challenging terrain and unpredictable weather to reach the finish line.

== 2019 Air Race Classic ==
The 2019 race will take off at June 18, 2019, from Jackson, Tennessee, for a 2,538-mile international competition that ends June 21 in Welland, Ontario.

== 2014 Air Race Classic ==
The 2014 race will occur June 16–19, 2014 with ten stops in 4 days flying from Concord, California to New Cumberland, Pennsylvania in the quest for the fastest time.

== 2012 Air Race Classic ==
The 2012 race will run from Lake Havasu City, Arizona (HII, Lake Havasu City Airport) to Batavia, Ohio (I69, Clermont County Airport), a distance of 2330.2 nm/2681.5 sm.

== 2011 Air Race Classic ==
June 17–21, 2011 from Iowa City, Iowa (IOW, Iowa City Municipal Airport) to Mobile, Alabama (BFM, Mobile Downtown Airport), a distance of 2365.4 nm/2722.0 sm. The race was won by Leah Hetzel and Sarah Morris flying a Cirrus SR-20.

== 2010 Air Race Classic ==
June 22–25, 2010 from Fort Myers, Florida (RSW, Southwest Florida International Airport) to Frederick, Maryland (FDK, Frederick Municipal Airport), a distance of 2,158 nm. This year's theme was "100 years of licensed women pilots." The race was won by Terry Carbonell of Alva, Florida, Ellen Herr of Fort Myers, and Laura Ying Gao of Spring Hill, Florida.

== 2009 Air Race Classic ==
June 23–26, 2009 from Denver (APA, Centennial Airport) to Atlantic, Iowa (AIO, Atlantic Municipal Airport), a distance of 2359.0 nm/2714.7 sm. The race was won by pilots Kelly Burris of Ann Arbor, Michigan and Erin Recke of Seattle in a Beechcraft Debonair.

== 2008 Air Race Classic ==
Thirty-three teams completed the race in June 2008, flying a course from Bozeman, Montana (BZN, Gallatin Field Airport) to Mansfield, Massachusetts (1B9, Mansfield Municipal Airport). Intermediate route stops were Miles City, Montana, Aberdeen, South Dakota, Mason City, Iowa, Decatur, Illinois, Frankfort, Kentucky, Franklin, Pennsylvania, and Saratoga Springs, New York.

== 2003 Air Race Classic ==
Thirty-six planes participated in the 2003 race from June 21 through June 25 flying over 2000 miles. The race started in Pratt, KS and finished in Kitty Hawk, NC and was amongst several world-wide races commemorating the 100th anniversary of powered flight. f Elaine Roehrig won the 2003 All Women's Air Race Classic with navigator/co-pilot Marolyn Wilson. The women flew a 1965 Piper/Cherokee PA-28-140.
