= RDK =

RDK may refer to:

- Reichsbund der Kinderreichen, a defunct German Natalist group
- Russian Volunteer Corps, a Russian nationalist paramilitary unit, fighting for the side of Ukraine. (Russkiy dobrovolcheskiy korpus)
- RDK, the FAA LID code for Red Oak Municipal Airport, Iowa, United States
