= Toledo Municipal Airport =

Toledo Municipal Airport may refer to:

- Toledo Municipal Airport (Iowa)
- Toledo Executive Airport, Ohio, formerly Toledo Municipal Airport
