= 004 =

004, 0O4, O04, OO4 may refer to:

- 004, fictional British 00 Agent
- 0O4, Corning Municipal Airport (California)
- O04, the Oversea-Chinese Banking Corporation
- Abdul Haq Wasiq, Guantanamo detainee 004
- Junkers Jumo 004 turbojet engine
- Lauda Air Flight 004, an international passenger flight operated by a Boeing 767-300ER that crashed on 26 May 1991
- Charmander, the 4th Pokémon (#004) from the first generation Kanto region Pokédex
- BAR 004, a Formula One racing car
- Tyrrell 004, a Formula One racing car

== See also ==
- A-004, the sixth and final test of the Apollo launch escape vehicle
