= Osceola Municipal Airport =

Osceola Municipal Airport may refer to:

- Osceola Municipal Airport (Arkansas) in Osceola, Arkansas, United States (FAA: 7M4)
- Osceola Municipal Airport (Iowa) in Osceola, Iowa, United States (FAA: I75)
- Osceola Municipal Airport (Missouri) in Osceola, Missouri, United States (FAA: 3MO)
