= MPZ =

MPZ or mpz may refer to:

- Myelin protein zero, a single membrane glycoprotein which in humans is encoded by the MPZ gene
- MPZ, the DS100 code for Penzberg station, Bavaria, Germany
- MPZ, the IATA and FAA LID code for Mount Pleasant Municipal Airport (Iowa), Iowa, United States
- mpz, the ISO 639-3 code for Mpi language, Thailand
