= CSQ =

CSQ may refer to:

- Centrale des syndicats du Québec, a Canadian trade union
- Conseil de la Souveraineté du Québec, a nonpartisan association for independence of Quebec, now renamed to Organisations unies pour l'indépendance (OUI).
- Conservatory String Quartet, a Canadian string quartet
- The airport code for Creston Municipal Airport
- The ISO 639-3 code for Croatian Sign Language
