= Bloomfield Municipal Airport =

Bloomfield Municipal Airport may refer to:

- Bloomfield Municipal Airport (Iowa) in Bloomfield, Iowa, United States (FAA: 4K6)
- Bloomfield Municipal Airport (Nebraska) in Bloomfield, Nebraska, United States (FAA: 84Y)
