= EYS =

EYS or Eys can refer to:

- Eliye Springs Airport (IATA code EYS), an airport in Kenya
- Eu Yan Sang, a company specialising in traditional Chinese medicine
- Eys, a village in the Netherlands
