= Humboldt Municipal Airport =

Humboldt Municipal Airport may refer to:

- Humboldt Municipal Airport (Iowa) in Humboldt, Iowa, United States (FAA: 0K7)
- Humboldt Municipal Airport (Tennessee) in Humboldt, Tennessee, United States (FAA: M53)
