= Toledo Airport =

Toledo Airport may refer to:

- Toledo Airport (Brazil) in Toledo, Paraná, Brazil (IATA: TOW)
- Toledo Express Airport in Toledo, Ohio, United States (IATA: TOL)
- Toledo Suburban Airport in Lambertville, Michigan, United States (IATA: DUH)
- Toledo State Airport in Toledo, Oregon, United States (FAA: 5S4)
- Toledo Municipal Airport (Iowa) in Toledo, Iowa, United States (FAA: 8C5)
