= MXO =

MXO may refer to:

- Monticello Regional Airport, the FAA LID code MXO
- Maxtor, the NYSE code MXO
- Mbowe language, the ISO 639-3 code mxo
- The Matrix Online (MxO), a massively multiplayer online role-playing game
