= Muscatine Municipal Airport =

Airport in Iowa

- IATA: MUT; ICAO: KMUT; FAA LID: MUT

Summary
- Airport type: Public
- Owner: City of Muscatine
- Serves: Muscatine, Iowa
- Elevation AMSL: 547 ft (167 m)
- Coordinates: 41°22′04″N 091°08′54″W

Map
- Location within Iowa Location within the United States

Runways
Direction	Length		Surface
Direction	ft	m	Surface
6/24	5,500	1,676	Concrete
12/30	4,000	1,219	Concrete

Statistics (2007)
- Aircraft operations: 14,106
- Based aircraft: 36
- Source: Federal Aviation Administration

Muscatine Municipal Airport (IATA: MUT, ICAO: KMUT, FAA LID: MUT) five miles (8 km) southwest of Muscatine, in Muscatine County, Iowa, United States.

Ozark Airlines DC-3s served Muscatine for a year or two starting in 1951.

== Facilities ==
The airport covers 604 acres (244 ha) and has two concrete runways: 6/24 is 5,500 x 100 ft (1,676 x 30 m) and 12/30 is 4,000 x 75 ft (1,219 x 23 m), both in good condition. Runway 24 is equipped with an ILS system with MALSR approach lighting. Runways 6/24 are equipped with VASI glide slope indicators and runways 12/30 are equipped with PAPI glide slope indicators. At night, all approach lighting can be activated via CTAF (Preset OFF). All runways have RNAV approaches and low to high intensity lighting, which can be increased via CTAF (Present Low). All runways have a left traffic pattern.

In the year ending May 24, 2007 the airport had 14,106 aircraft operations, average 38 per day: 94% general aviation and 6% air taxi. 36 aircraft were then based at this airport: 75% single-engine, 8% multi-engine, 11% jet and 6% glider.

The local fixed-base operator, Carver Aero, provides aircraft charter, aircraft rental, and flight training, with some line services available. The airport is staffed from approximately 07:00 to 18:00 local (except holidays).

KMUT is equipped with an AWOS-3, found on frequency 119.755, and the combined CTAF and UNICOM is on frequency 122.700. The "Port City" VOR-DME (DDD) is located on site, with frequency 116.50.

== Accidents and incidents ==
January 16, 1997 an Learjet 24 operated by Air Cargo Express crashed after landing at Muscatine. Snow on the side of the runway caused the plane to be dragged to the left. Probable cause was the pilot's failure to maintain directional control.

== See also ==
- List of airports in Iowa
