= Hawarden Municipal Airport =

- IATA: none; ICAO: none; FAA LID: 2Y2

Summary
- Airport type: Public
- Owner: City of Hawarden
- Serves: Hawarden, Iowa
- Elevation AMSL: 1,190 ft (360 m)
- Coordinates: 43°02′13″N 096°29′34″W

Map
- Location of airport in Iowa

Runways
Direction	Length		Surface
Direction	ft	m	Surface
16/34	2,030	619	Concrete

Statistics (2008)
- Aircraft operations: 1,250
- Based aircraft: 5
- Source: Federal Aviation Administration

Hawarden Municipal Airport (FAA LID: 2Y2) was a city-owned, public-use airport located two nautical miles (4 km) north of the central business district of Hawarden, a city in Sioux County, Iowa. It was closed at unspecified date.

== Facilities and aircraft ==
Hawarden Municipal Airport covered an area of 69 acres (28 ha) at an elevation of 1,190 feet (363 m) above mean sea level. It had one runway designated 16/34 with a concrete surface measuring 2,030 by 50 feet (619 x 15 m).

For the 12-month period ending April 16, 2008, the airport had 1,250 general aviation aircraft operations, an average of 104 per month. At that time there were five single-engine aircraft based at this airport.

== See also ==
- List of airports in Iowa
