= Eldora Municipal Airport =

Eldora Airport
- IATA: none; ICAO: none; FAA LID: 27P (formerly 6C0)

Summary
- Airport type: Public
- Owner: Marc Broer
- Serves: Eldora, Iowa
- Elevation AMSL: 979 ft (298 m)
- Coordinates: 42°19′49″N 093°06′51″W

Map
- Location of airport in Iowa 27P (the United States)

Runways
Direction	Length		Surface
Direction	ft	m	Surface
18/36	2,750	838	Turf

Statistics (2011)
- Aircraft operations: 304
- Source: Federal Aviation Administration

Eldora Airport (FAA LID: 27P (formerly 6C0)) is a privately owned, public-use airport located two nautical miles (4 km) southwest of the central business district of Eldora, a city in Hardin County, Iowa, United States.

== Facilities and aircraft ==
Eldora Airport covers an area of 17 acres (7 ha) at an elevation of 979 feet (298 m) above mean sea level. It has one runway designated 18/36 with a turf surface measuring 2,750 by 100 feet (838 x 30 m).

For the 12-month period ending July 29, 2011, the airport had 304 general aviation aircraft operations, an average of 25 per month.

== See also ==
- List of airports in Iowa
