= Northeast Iowa Regional Airport =

- IATA: CCY; ICAO: KCCY; FAA LID: CCY

Summary
- Airport type: Public
- Owner: North Cedar Aviation Authority
- Serves: Charles City, Iowa
- Elevation AMSL: 1,125 ft (343 m)
- Coordinates: 43°04′21″N 092°36′39″W

Map
- Location of airport in Iowa/United States CCY (the United States)

Runways
| Direction | Length | | Surface |
| Direction | ft | m | Surface |
|---|---|---|---|
| 12/30 | 4,001 | 1,220 | Concrete |
| 4/22 | 2,536 | 773 | Turf |
| 17/35 | 1,780 | 543 | Turf |

Statistics (2007)
- Aircraft operations: 5,250
- Based aircraft: 24
- Source: Federal Aviation Administration

Northeast Iowa Regional Airport (IATA: CCY, ICAO: KCCY, FAA LID: CCY) is a public airport located three miles (5 km) east of the central business district of Charles City, in Floyd County, Iowa, United States. It is owned by the North Cedar Aviation Authority and was formerly known as Charles City Municipal Airport.

== Facilities and aircraft ==
Northeast Iowa Regional Airport covers an area of 200 acres (81 ha) which contains one concrete paved runway: 12/30 measuring 4,001 x 75 ft (1,220 x 23 m). It also has two turf runways: 4/22 measuring 2,536 x 160 ft (773 x 49 m) and 17/35 measuring 1,780 x 170 ft (543 x 52 m).

For the 12-month period ending August 14, 2007, the airport had 5,250 aircraft operations, an average of 14 per day: 87% general aviation and 13% air taxi. At that time there were 24 aircraft based at this airport: 88% single-engine and 13% multi-engine.

== See also ==
- List of airports in Iowa
