= Algona Municipal Airport =

- IATA: AXG; ICAO: KAXA; FAA LID: AXA

Summary
- Airport type: Public
- Owner: City of Algona
- Serves: Algona, Iowa
- Elevation AMSL: 1,219 ft (372 m)
- Coordinates: 43°04′40″N 094°16′19″W

Map
- Location of airport in Iowa/United States AXA (the United States)

Runways
Direction	Length		Surface
Direction	ft	m	Surface
12/30	3,960	1,207	Concrete
18/36	2,895	882	Turf

Statistics (2023)
- Aircraft operations (year ending 6/28/2023): 7,500
- Source: Federal Aviation Administration

Algona Municipal Airport (IATA: AXG, ICAO: KAXA, FAA LID: AXA) is a public airport located two miles (3 km) west of the central business district of Algona, a city in Kossuth County, Iowa, United States. It is owned by the City of Algona.

Although most U.S. airports use the same three-letter location identifier for the FAA and IATA, Algona Municipal is assigned AXA by the FAA and AXG by the IATA (which assigned AXA to Wallblake Airport in Anguilla).

== Facilities and aircraft ==
Algona Municipal Airport covers an area of 221 acres (89 ha) which contains two runways: 12/30 with a concrete pavement measuring 3,960 by 75 ft (1,207 by 23 m) and 18/36 with a turf surface measuring 2,895 by 160 ft (882 by 49 m).

For the 12-month period ending June 28, 2023, the airport had 7,500 aircraft operations, an average of 21 per day, all of which were general aviation.

== See also ==
- List of airports in Iowa
