= Audubon County Airport =

- IATA: none; ICAO: KADU; FAA LID: ADU

Summary
- Airport type: Public
- Owner: Audubon County Airport Authority
- Location: Audubon, Iowa
- Elevation AMSL: 1,287 ft (392 m)
- Coordinates: 41°42′05″N 094°55′14″W

Map
- Location of airport in Iowa/United States ADU (the United States)

Runways
Direction	Length		Surface
Direction	ft	m	Surface
14/32	3,640	1,109	Concrete

Statistics (2005)
- Aircraft operations: 2,562
- Source: Federal Aviation Administration

Audubon County Airport (ICAO: KADU, FAA LID: ADU), formerly Audubon Municipal Airport, is a public airport located one mile (2 km) southeast of the central business district of Audubon, a city in Audubon County, Iowa, United States. It is owned by the Audubon County Airport Authority.

Although most U.S. airports use the same three-letter location identifier for the FAA and IATA, Audubon County Airport is assigned ADU by the FAA but has no designation from the IATA (which assigned ADU to Ardabil Airport in Ardabil, Iran).

== Facilities and aircraft ==
Audubon County Airport covers an area of 46 acres (19 ha) which contains one concrete paved runway (14/32) measuring 3,640 x 60 ft (1,109 x 18 m). For the 12-month period ending September 28, 2005, the airport had 2,562 aircraft operations: 96% general aviation and 4% air taxi.

== See also ==
- List of airports in Iowa
