= Arthur N. Neu Airport =

- IATA: CIN; ICAO: KCIN; FAA LID: CIN

Summary
- Airport type: Public
- Owner: City of Carroll
- Serves: Carroll, Iowa
- Elevation AMSL: 1,204 ft (367 m)
- Coordinates: 42°02′46″N 094°47′20″W
- Website: cityofcarroll.com/...

Map
- Location within Iowa Location within the United States

Runways
Direction	Length		Surface
Direction	ft	m	Surface
13/31	5,506	1,678	Concrete
3/21	3,301	1,006	Concrete

Statistics
- Aircraft operations (2015): 7,700
- Based aircraft (2017): 16
- Source: Federal Aviation Administration

Arthur N. Neu Airport (IATA: CIN, ICAO: KCIN, FAA LID: CIN) is a public airport five miles southeast of Carroll, in Carroll County, Iowa. Also known as Arthur N. Neu Municipal Airport, it was established at its current location in the 1940s.

== Facilities ==
Arthur N. Neu Airport covers 300 acres (120 ha) at an elevation of 1,204 feet (367 m). It has two lighted runways: Runway 13/31 is 5,506 by 100 feet (1,676 x 30 m) with an instrument approach and non-directional beacon. Runway 3/21 is 3,301 by 60 feet (1,006 x 18 m).

In the year ending August 20, 2017, the airport had 7,700 aircraft operations, average 21 per day: 91% general aviation, 8% air taxi and <1% military. In January 2017, 16 aircraft were based at the airport: 11 single-engine, 4 multi-engine and 1 ultralight. The airport has hangar space for 24 aircraft.

== See also ==
- List of airports in Iowa
