= James G. Whiting Memorial Field =

- IATA: none; ICAO: KMEY; FAA LID: MEY

Summary
- Airport type: Public
- Owner: City of Mapleton
- Serves: Mapleton, Iowa
- Elevation AMSL: 1,116 ft (340 m)
- Coordinates: 42°10′42″N 095°47′37″W

Map
- Location of airport in Iowa/United States MEY (the United States)

Runways
Direction	Length		Surface
Direction	ft	m	Surface
2/20	2,801	854	Concrete

Statistics (2011)
- Aircraft operations: 3,250
- Based aircraft: 10
- Source: Federal Aviation Administration

James G. Whiting Memorial Field (ICAO: KMEY, FAA LID: MEY) is a city-owned public-use airport located one nautical mile (2 km) north of the central business district of Mapleton, a city in Monona County, Iowa, United States. It is included in the National Plan of Integrated Airport Systems for 2011–2015, which categorized it as a general aviation facility.

Although many U.S. airports use the same three-letter location identifier for the FAA and IATA, this airport is assigned MEY by the FAA but has no designation from the IATA (which assigned MEY to Meghauli Airport in Meghauli, Nepal).

== Facilities and aircraft ==
James G. Whiting Memorial Field covers an area of 164 acres (66 ha) at an elevation of 1,116 feet (340 m) above mean sea level. It has one runway designated 2/20 with a concrete surface measuring 2,801 by 60 feet (854 x 18 m).

For the 12-month period ending March 17, 2011, the airport had 3,250 general aviation aircraft operations, an average of 270 per month. At that time there were 10 aircraft based at this airport: 80% single-engine and 20% ultralight.

== See also ==
- List of airports in Iowa
