= Anita Municipal Airport =

Anita Municipal Airport Kevin Burke Memorial Field
- IATA: none; ICAO: none; FAA LID: Y43

Summary
- Airport type: Public
- Owner: City of Anita
- Serves: Anita, Iowa
- Elevation AMSL: 1,251 ft (381 m)
- Coordinates: 41°26′25″N 094°46′11″W
- Website: www.AnitaIowa.com/...

Map
- Location of airport in Iowa Y43 (the United States)

Runways
Direction	Length		Surface
Direction	ft	m	Surface
5/23	2,825	861	Turf

Statistics (2009)
- Aircraft operations: 1,000
- Source: Federal Aviation Administration

Anita Municipal Airport (FAA LID: Y43), also known as Kevin Burke Memorial Field, is a city-owned public-use airport located one nautical mile (2 km) south of the central business district of Anita, a city in Cass County, Iowa, United States.

== Facilities and aircraft ==
Anita Municipal Airport covers an area of 40 acres (16 ha) at an elevation of 1,251 feet (381 m) above mean sea level. It has one runway designated 5/23 with a turf surface measuring 2,825 by 95 feet (861 x 29 m). For the 12-month period ending March 18, 2009, the airport had 1,000 general aviation aircraft operations, an average of 83 per month.

== See also ==
- List of airports in Iowa
