= Corning Airport =

Corning Airport may refer to:

- Elmira-Corning Regional Airport, Elmira, New York

== See also ==
- Corning Municipal Airport (disambiguation)
