= Decorah Municipal Airport =

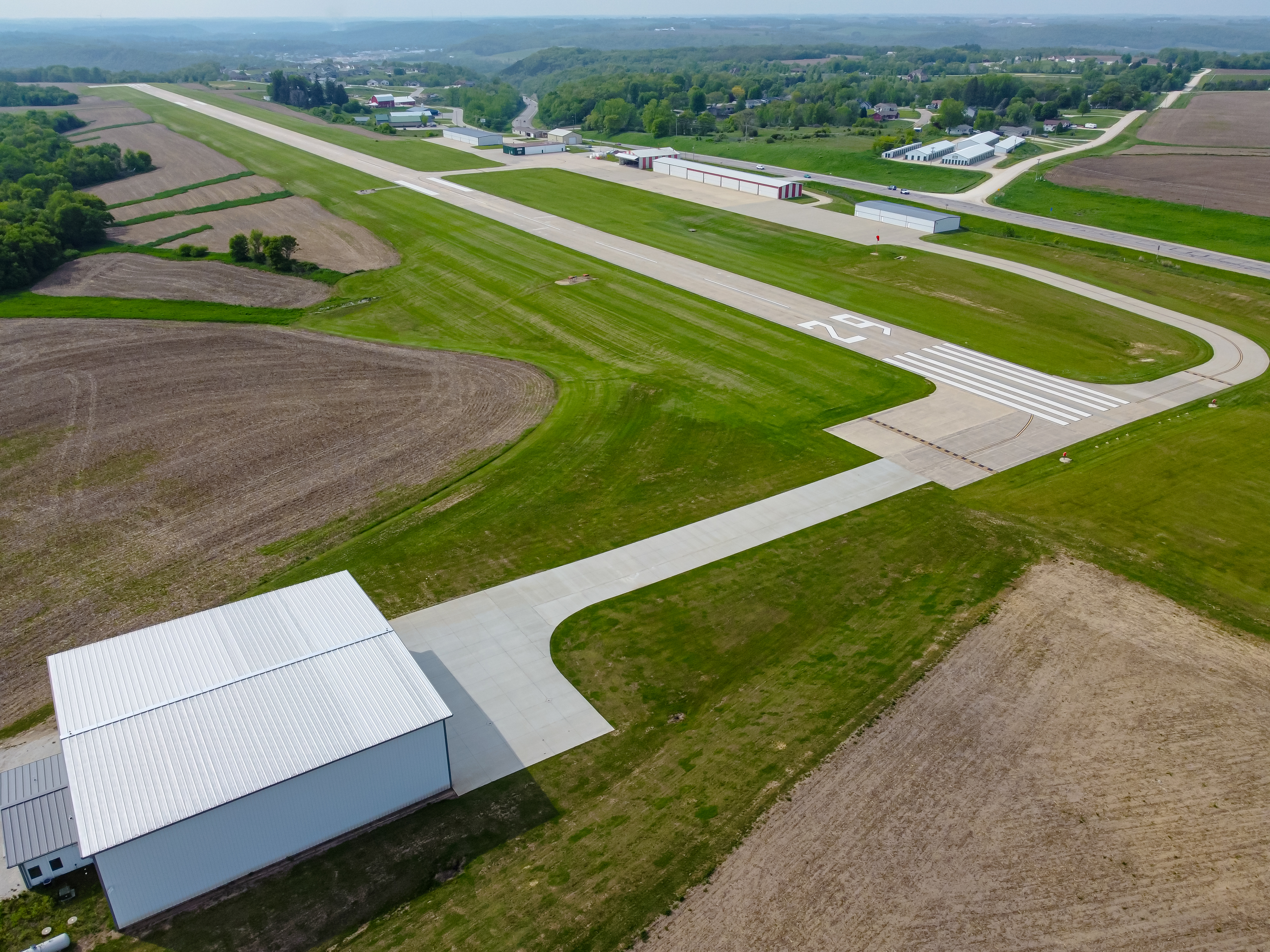
- IATA: DEH; ICAO: KDEH; FAA LID: DEH

Summary
- Airport type: Public
- Owner: City of Decorah
- Serves: Decorah, Iowa
- Elevation AMSL: 1,158 ft (353 m)
- Coordinates: 43°16′32″N 091°44′22″W

Map
- Location of airport in Iowa/United States DEH (the United States)

Runways
Direction	Length		Surface
Direction	ft	m	Surface
11/29	4,001	1,220	Concrete

Statistics (2007)
- Aircraft operations: 9,100
- Based aircraft: 25
- Source: Federal Aviation Administration

Decorah Municipal Airport (IATA: DEH, ICAO: KDEH, FAA LID: DEH) is a city-owned public-use airport located two nautical miles (3.7 km) southeast of the central business district of Decorah, in Winneshiek County, Iowa, United States.

== Facilities and aircraft ==
Decorah Municipal Airport covers an area of 154 acres (62 ha) at an elevation of 1,158 feet (353 m) above mean sea level. It has one runway designated 11/29 with a concrete surface measuring 4,001 by 75 feet (1,220 x 23 m).

For the 12-month period ending July 19, 2007, the airport had 9,100 general aviation aircraft operations, an average of 24 per day. At that time, there were 25 aircraft based at this airport: 96% single-engine and 4% ultralight.

== See also ==
- List of airports in Iowa
