= Waverly Municipal Airport =

- IATA: none; ICAO: none; FAA LID: C25

Summary
- Owner: City of Waverly
- Location: Waverly, Iowa
- Coordinates: 42°44′30″N 092°30′24″W

Maps
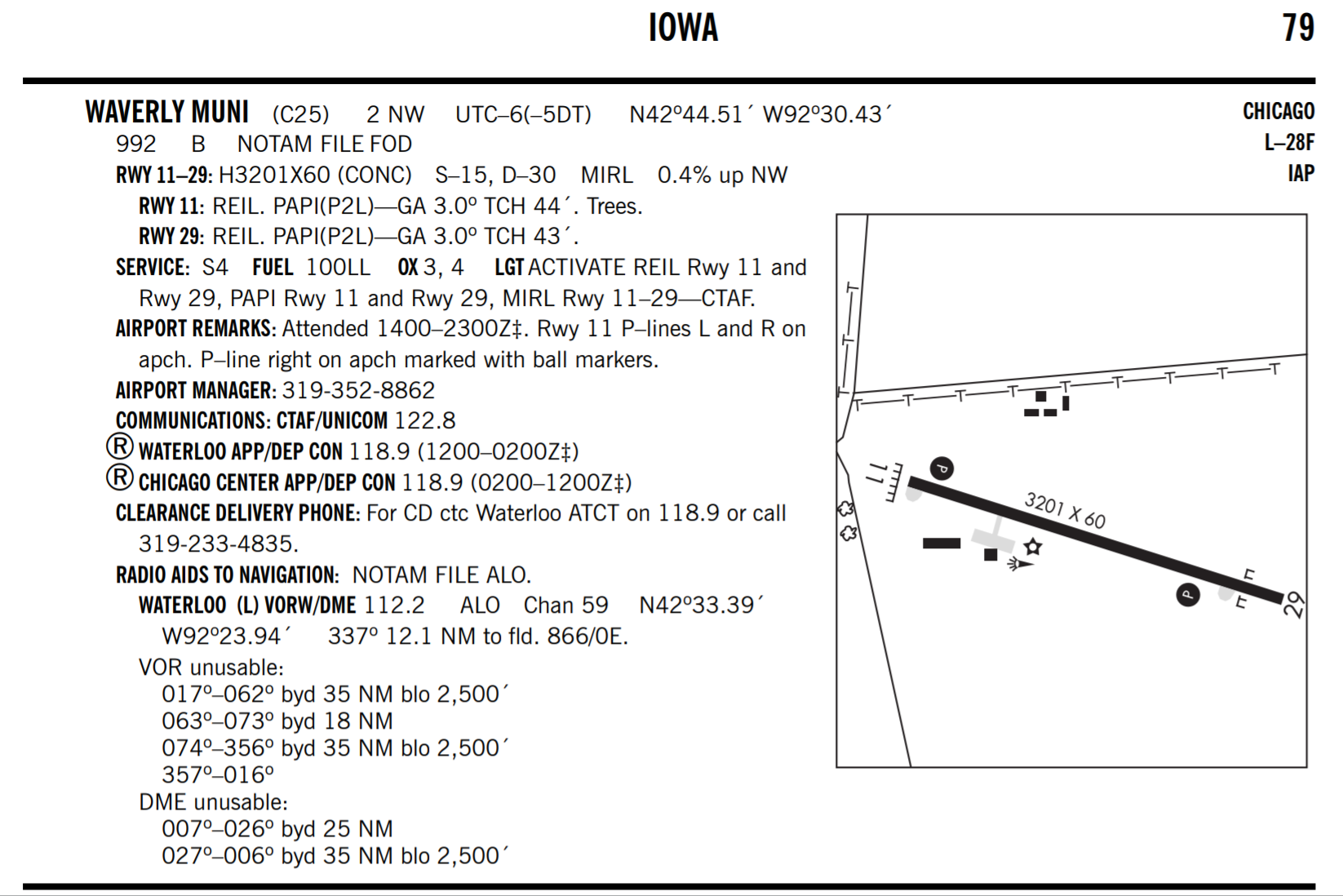
- Runway chart for Waverly Municipal Airport

- Location in Iowa C25 (the United States)

Runways
Direction	Length		Surface
Direction	ft	m	Surface
11/29	3,201	976	Concrete

Waverly Municipal Airport (FAA LID: C25) is in Waverly, Iowa, United States, on 35th Street approximately 2 nautical miles away from the city center.

The airport is owned and maintained by the City of Waverly. It is a public use airport and can service a wide variety of small single and multi-engine piston and turboprop aircraft.

== Current use ==
The airport mostly sees use by transient air traffic and agricultural aircraft. A small number of aircraft are permanently based here. A small set of hangars are located near the FBO/maintenance building. Waverly Municipal Airport is frequently used for crop dusting and other agricultural aviation purposes. It is also home to a maintenance facility capable of doing major airframe maintenance and overhaul on small to mid-size general aviation aircraft.

== Airport services ==
Waverly Municipal Airport offers multiple services on site from multiple companies. These include:

- Swieter Aircraft - Airframe, engine, and aircraft systems maintenance/overhaul provider
- Waverly Air Service - Fixed-base operator (FBO) based at the airport, responsible for providing fuel and hangar/tie-down services
- Iowa Flight Training - Offers flight lessons and pilot training materials
- McCandless Aircraft and Avionics - Aircraft parts and avionics dealer and installer

Self-service fuel is also available to aircraft at the airport; only 100LL AvGas is sold.

== Runway ==
Waverly Municipal Airport has one runway. Its east end is at heading 287° and its west end is at heading 107°. The east end of the runway is marked 29 and the west end is marked 11. The runway is 3,201ft long and made from concrete. Lights are installed on the runway for safe nighttime operations. The runway is long enough to land all small single-engine piston aircraft and most multi-engine piston aircraft. Most types of single-engine turboprop aircraft can also land safely, as well as some small multi-engine turboprop aircraft. The runway can support a select few very light jets, but the airport does not provide Jet A1 fuel for these aircraft.

== See also ==
- List of airports in Iowa
