= Denison Municipal Airport =

Airport in Iowa, United States

- IATA: DNS; ICAO: KDNS; FAA LID: DNS

Summary
- Airport type: Public
- Owner: City of Denison
- Serves: Denison, Iowa
- Elevation AMSL: 1,274 ft (388 m)
- Coordinates: 41°59′12″N 095°22′50″W
- Website: www.DenisonIA.com/...

Map
- Location of airport in Iowa / United States DNS (the United States)

Runways
Direction	Length		Surface
Direction	ft	m	Surface
12/30	5,000	1,524	Concrete
18/36	2,019	615	Turf
6/24	1,790	546	Turf

Statistics (2012)
- Aircraft operations: 6,309
- Based aircraft: 11
- Source: Federal Aviation Administration

Denison Municipal Airport (IATA: DNS, ICAO: KDNS, FAA LID: DNS) is a city-owned, public-use airport located two nautical miles (4 km) southwest of the central business district of Denison, a city in Crawford County, Iowa, United States. It is included in the National Plan of Integrated Airport Systems for 2011–2015, which categorized it as a general aviation facility.

== Facilities and aircraft ==
Denison Municipal Airport covers an area of 205 acres (83 ha) at an elevation of 1,274 feet (388 m) above mean sea level. It has one concrete paved runway designated 12/30 which is 5,000 by 75 feet (1,524 x 23 m) and two turf runways: 18/36 is 2,019 by 105 feet (615 x 32 m) and 6/24 is 1,790 by 178 feet (546 x 54 m).

For the 12-month period ending May 30, 2012, the airport had 6,309 aircraft operations, an average of 17 per day: 97% general aviation, 3% air taxi, and <1% military. At that time there were 11 aircraft based at this airport: 82% single-engine and 18% multi-engine.

== See also ==
- List of airports in Iowa
