= Spirit Lake Municipal Airport =

Airport in Iowa, United States

- IATA: RTL; ICAO: none; FAA LID: 0F3

Summary
- Airport type: Public
- Owner: Dickinson County Airport Authority
- Location: Okoboji, Iowa
- Elevation AMSL: 1,434 ft / 437 m
- Coordinates: 43°23′14.867″N 95°8′20.984″W

Map
- Location of airport in Iowa OF3 (the United States)

Runways
Direction	Length		Surface
Direction	ft	m	Surface
16/34	3,015	919	Asphalt

Statistics (2012)
- Aircraft operations: 4,200
- Based aircraft: 12
- Source: Federal Aviation Administration

Spirit Lake Municipal Airport (IATA: RTL, FAA LID: 0F3) is a county-owned public-use airport located in Okoboji, Iowa, United States.

== Facilities and aircraft ==
Spirit Lake Municipal Airport covers an area of 65 acres (26 ha) and contains one asphalt runway (16/34: 3,015 × 50 ft). For the 12-month period ending June 12, 2012, the airport had 4,200 aircraft operations. There are 12 aircraft based at this airport: 11 single-engine and 1 multi-engine.

== See also ==
- List of airports in Iowa
