= List of airports in Iowa =

This is a list of airports in Iowa (a U.S. state), grouped by type and sorted by location. It contains all public-use and military airports in the state. Some private-use and former airports may be included where notable, such as airports that were previously public-use, those with commercial enplanements recorded by the FAA or airports assigned an IATA airport code.

== Airports ==
This list contains the following information:

- **City served** – The city generally associated with the airport, as per the airport's master record with the Federal Aviation Administration. This is not always the actual location since some airports are located in smaller towns outside of the city they serve. It is not meant to be a complete list of cities served, which can be found in or added to each airport's Wikipedia article.
- **FAA** – The location identifier assigned by the Federal Aviation Administration (FAA). These are linked to each airport's page at the Iowa DOT Office of Aviation.
- **IATA** – The airport code assigned by the International Air Transport Association (IATA). Those that do not match the FAA code are shown in bold.
- **ICAO** – The location indicator assigned by the International Civil Aviation Organization (ICAO).
- **Airport name** – The official airport name. Those shown in **bold** indicate the airport has scheduled passenger service on commercial airlines.
- **Role** – One of four FAA airport categories, as per the 2017–2021 National Plan of Integrated Airport Systems (NPIAS) report released September 2016:
  - P-s: Commercial service – primary are publicly owned airports that receive scheduled passenger service and have more than 10,000 passenger boardings (enplanements) each year. Each primary airport is sub-classified by the FAA as one of the following four "hub" types (s):
    - L: Large hub that accounts for at least 1% of total U.S. passenger enplanements.
    - M: Medium hub that accounts for between 0.25% and 1% of total U.S. passenger enplanements.
    - S: Small hub that accounts for between 0.05% and 0.25% of total U.S. passenger enplanements.
    - N: Nonhub that accounts for less than 0.05% of total U.S. passenger enplanements, but more than 10,000 annual enplanements.
  - CS: Commercial service – nonprimary are publicly owned airports that receive scheduled passenger service and have at least 2,500 passenger boardings each year.
  - R: Reliever airports are designated by the FAA to relieve congestion at a large commercial service airport and to provide more general aviation access to the overall community.
  - GA: General aviation airports are the largest single group of airports in the U.S. airport system. They are public-use airports that do not have scheduled service or have scheduled service with less than 2,500 passenger boardings each year.
- **Enplanements** – The number of enplanements (commercial passenger boardings) that occurred at the airport in calendar year 2024, as per FAA records released 2025.

City served	FAA	IATA	ICAO	Airport name	Role	Enplanements (2024)
				**Commercial service – primary airports**		
Cedar Rapids	CID	CID	KCID	**Eastern Iowa Airport**	P-S	759,978
Des Moines	DSM	DSM	KDSM	**Des Moines International Airport**	P-S	1,555,454
Dubuque	DBQ	DBQ	KDBQ	**Dubuque Regional Airport**	P-N	6,078
Sioux City	SUX	SUX	KSUX	**Sioux Gateway Airport** (Brig. General Bud Day Field)	P-N	28,299
Waterloo	ALO	ALO	KALO	**Waterloo Regional Airport**	P-N	12,006
				**Commercial service – nonprimary airports**		
Burlington	BRL	BRL	KBRL	**Southeast Iowa Regional Airport**	CS	3,951
Fort Dodge	FOD	FOD	KFOD	**Fort Dodge Regional Airport**	CS	7,733
Mason City	MCW	MCW	KMCW	**Mason City Municipal Airport**	CS	6,564
				**Reliever airports**		
Ankeny	IKV	IKV	KIKV	Ankeny Regional Airport	R	319
				**General aviation airports**		
Albia	4C8			Albia Municipal Airport	GA	0
Algona	AXA	**AXG**	KAXA	Algona Municipal Airport	GA	0
Ames	AMW	AMW	KAMW	Ames Municipal Airport	GA	18
Atlantic	AIO	AIO	KAIO	Atlantic Municipal Airport	GA	0
Audubon	ADU		KADU	Audubon County Airport (was Audubon Municipal)	GA	0
Belle Plaine	TZT		KTZT	Belle Plaine Municipal Airport	GA	0
Bloomfield	4K6			Bloomfield Municipal Airport	GA	0
Boone	BNW	BNW	KBNW	Boone Municipal Airport	GA	0
Carroll	CIN	CIN	KCIN	Arthur N. Neu Airport	GA	0
Centerville	TVK		KTVK	Centerville Municipal Airport	GA	0
Chariton	CNC		KCNC	Chariton Municipal Airport	GA	0
Charles City	CCY	CCY	KCCY	Northeast Iowa Regional Airport (was Charles City Municipal)	GA	0
Cherokee	CKP		KCKP	Cherokee County Regional Airport (Iowa) (was Cherokee Municipal)	GA	0
Clarinda	ICL	ICL	KICL	Schenck Field	GA	0
Clarion	CAV		KCAV	Clarion Municipal Airport	GA	0
Clinton	CWI	CWI	KCWI	Clinton Municipal Airport	GA	0
Council Bluffs	CBF	CBF	KCBF	Council Bluffs Municipal Airport	GA	0
Creston	CSQ	CSQ	KCSQ	Creston Municipal Airport	GA	0
Davenport	DVN	DVN	KDVN	Davenport Municipal Airport	GA	0
Decorah	DEH	DEH	KDEH	Decorah Municipal Airport	GA	0
Denison	DNS	DNS	KDNS	Denison Municipal Airport	GA	0
Emmetsburg	EGQ		KEGQ	Emmetsburg Municipal Airport	GA	0
Estherville	EST	EST	KEST	Estherville Municipal Airport	GA	0
Fairfield	FFL	FFL	KFFL	Fairfield Municipal Airport	GA	0
Forest City	FXY	FXY	KFXY	Forest City Municipal Airport	GA	0
Fort Madison	FSW	**FMS**	KFSW	Fort Madison Municipal Airport	GA	0
Greenfield	GFZ		KGFZ	Greenfield Municipal Airport	GA	0
Grinnell	GGI		KGGI	Grinnell Regional Airport (was Grinnell Municipal)	GA	0
Guthrie Center	GCT		KGCT	Guthrie County Regional Airport	GA	0
Hampton	HPT	HPT	KHPT	Hampton Municipal Airport	GA	0
Harlan	HNR		KHNR	Harlan Municipal Airport	GA	0
Humboldt	0K7	HUD		Humboldt Municipal Airport	GA	0
Independence	IIB		KIIB	James H. Connell Field at Independence Municipal Airport	GA	0
Iowa City	IOW	IOW	KIOW	Iowa City Municipal Airport	GA	609
Iowa Falls	IFA	IFA	KIFA	Iowa Falls Municipal Airport	GA	1
Jefferson	EFW	EFW	KEFW	Jefferson Municipal Airport	GA	0
Keokuk	EOK	EOK	KEOK	Keokuk Municipal Airport	GA	0
Knoxville	OXV		KOXV	Knoxville Municipal Airport	GA	0
Lamoni	LWD		KLWD	Lamoni Municipal Airport	GA	0
Le Mars	LRJ	LRJ	KLRJ	Le Mars Municipal Airport	GA	0
Manchester	C27			Manchester Municipal Airport	GA	0
Mapleton	MEY		KMEY	James G. Whiting Memorial Field	GA	0
Maquoketa	OQW		KOQW	Maquoketa Municipal Airport	GA	0
Marshalltown	MIW	MIW	KMIW	Marshalltown Municipal Airport	GA	0
Maurice	SXK		KSXK	Sioux County Regional Airport	GA	2
Monticello	MXO	MXO	KMXO	Monticello Regional Airport	GA	0
Mount Pleasant	MPZ	MPZ	KMPZ	Mount Pleasant Municipal Airport	GA	5
Muscatine	MUT	MUT	KMUT	Muscatine Municipal Airport	GA	0
Newton	TNU	TNU	KTNU	Newton Municipal Airport (Earl Johnson Field)	GA	5
Oelwein	OLZ		KOLZ	Oelwein Municipal Airport	GA	6
Osceola	I75			Osceola Municipal Airport	GA	0
Oskaloosa	OOA	OOA	KOOA	Oskaloosa Municipal Airport	GA	0
Ottumwa	OTM	OTM	KOTM	Ottumwa Regional Airport (was Ottumwa Industrial Airport)	GA	0
Pella	PEA		KPEA	Pella Municipal Airport	GA	0
Perry	PRO	PRO	KPRO	Perry Municipal Airport	GA	0
Pocahontas	POH	POH	KPOH	Pocahontas Municipal Airport	GA	0
Red Oak	RDK		KRDK	Red Oak Municipal Airport	GA	0
Rockwell City	2Y4			Rockwell City Municipal Airport	GA	0
Sac City	SKI		KSKI	Sac City Municipal Airport	GA	0
Sheldon	SHL		KSHL	Sheldon Regional Airport	GA	0
Shenandoah	SDA		KSDA	Shenandoah Municipal Airport	GA	0
Spencer	SPW	SPW	KSPW	Spencer Municipal Airport	GA	6
Storm Lake	SLB	SLB	KSLB	Storm Lake Municipal Airport	GA	0
Tipton	8C4			Mathews Memorial Airport	GA	0
Vinton	VTI		KVTI	Vinton Veterans Memorial Airpark	GA	0
Washington	AWG		KAWG	Washington Municipal Airport	GA	0
Waverly	C25			Waverly Municipal Airport	GA	0
Webster City	EBS	EBS	KEBS	Webster City Municipal Airport	GA	0
West Union	3Y2			George L. Scott Municipal Airport	GA	0
Winterset	3Y3			Winterset Municipal Airport (was Winterset-Madison County)	GA	0
				**Other public-use airports** (not listed in NPIAS)		
Ackley	4C7			Ackley Municipal Airport		
Allison	K98			Allison Municipal Airport		
Amana	C11			Amana Airport		
Anita	Y43			Anita Municipal Airport (Kevin Burke Memorial Field)		
Bedford	Y46			Bedford Municipal Airport		
Belmond	Y48			Belmond Municipal Airport		
Corning	CRZ		KCRZ	Corning Municipal Airport		
Corydon	0E9			Corydon Airport		
Cresco	CJJ		KCJJ	Ellen Church Field		19
Des Moines	Y76			Morningstar Field (closed indefinitely)		
Dyersville	IA8			Dyersville Area Airport		
Eagle Grove	EAG		KEAG	Eagle Grove Municipal Airport		
Eldora	27P			Eldora Airport		
Elkader	I27			Elkader Airport		
Grundy Center	6K7			Grundy Center Municipal Airport		
Ida Grove	IDG	IDG	KIDG	Ida Grove Municipal Airport		
Indianola	6Z6			Nash Field Indianola		
Keosauqua	6K9			Keosauqua Municipal Airport		
Lake Mills	0Y6			Lake Mills Municipal Airport		
Larchwood	2VA			Zangger Vintage Airpark		
Marion	C17			Marion Airport		
Milford	4D8			Fuller Airport		
Monona	7C3			Monona Municipal Airport		
Montezuma	7C5			Sig Field		
Mount Ayr	1Y3			Mount Ayr Municipal Airport (Judge Lewis Field)		
New Hampton	1Y5			New Hampton Municipal Airport		
Northwood	5D2			Northwood Municipal Airport		
Osage	D02			Osage Municipal Airport		
Paullina	1Y9			Paullina Municipal Airport		
Radcliffe	2Y1			Drake Airport		
Ringsted	8Y8			Peltz Field		
Rock Rapids	RRQ		KRRQ	Rock Rapids Municipal Airport		
Sibley	ISB		KISB	Sibley Municipal Airport		
Spirit Lake	0F3	RTL		Spirit Lake Municipal Airport		
Sully	8C2			Sully Municipal Airport		
Toledo	8C5			Toledo Municipal Airport		
Traer	8C6			Traer Municipal Airport		
Waukon	Y01	UKN		Waukon Municipal Airport		
Woodbine	3Y4			Woodbine Municipal Airport		
				**Notable private-use airports**		
Guttenberg	IA23			GAA Private Airport		
Postville	IA45			Dale Delight Airport		
				**Notable former airports**		
Hartley	~~0Y4~~			Lambert Fechter Municipal Airport (closed 2008?)		
Hawarden	~~2Y2~~			Hawarden Municipal Airport		
Onawa	~~K36~~			Onawa Municipal Airport (closed 2015)		
Orange City	~~ORC~~		~~KORC~~	Orange City Municipal Airport (closed 2020?)		
Pekin				NOLF Linby (1943-1955)		
Primghar	~~2Y0~~			Primghar Airport (closed 2020?)		
Sioux Center	~~SOY~~		~~KSOY~~	Sioux Center Municipal Airport (closed 2020?)		
Wall Lake	~~3Y0~~			Wall Lake Municipal Airport (closed 2005/2006?)		

== See also ==
- Essential Air Service
- Iowa World War II Army Airfields
- Wikipedia:WikiProject Aviation/Airline destination lists: North America#Iowa
