= Perry Municipal Airport (Iowa) =

Airport in Iowa

- IATA: PRO; ICAO: KPRO; FAA LID: PRO

Summary
- Airport type: Public
- Owner: City of Perry
- Serves: Perry, Iowa
- Elevation AMSL: 1,013 ft / 309 m
- Coordinates: 41°49′41″N 094°09′35″W

Map
- Location of airport in Iowa/United States PRO (the United States)

Runways
Direction	Length		Surface
Direction	ft	m	Surface
14/32	5,500	1,676	Concrete
4/22	2,322	708	Turf

Statistics (2007)
- Aircraft operations: 4,750
- Based aircraft: 19
- Source: Federal Aviation Administration

Perry Municipal Airport (IATA: PRO, ICAO: KPRO, FAA LID: PRO) is a city-owned public-use airport located three nautical miles (6 km) west of the central business district of Perry, a city in Dallas County, Iowa, United States. This airport is included in the FAA's National Plan of Integrated Airport Systems for 2015–2019, which categorized it as a general aviation facility. The Perry Municipal Airport is the only Public Airport in Dallas County.

== Facilities and aircraft ==
Perry Municipal Airport covers an area of 138 acres (56 ha) at an elevation of 1,013 feet (309 m) above mean sea level. It has two runways: 14/32 is 5,500 by 100 feet (1,676 x 30 m) with a grooved concrete surface and 4/22 is 2,322 by 237 feet (708 x 72 m) with a turf surface.

For the 12-month period ending July 16, 2007, the airport had 4,750 aircraft operations, an average of 13 per day: 98% general aviation and 2% military. At that time there were 19 aircraft based at this airport: 95% single-engine and 5% jet.

In early November 2022, Jack Butler became the general manager. Previously, he was the director of Perry public works for 23 years.

== See also ==
- List of airports in Iowa
