= Clinton Municipal Airport (Iowa) =

Airport in Iowa, United States

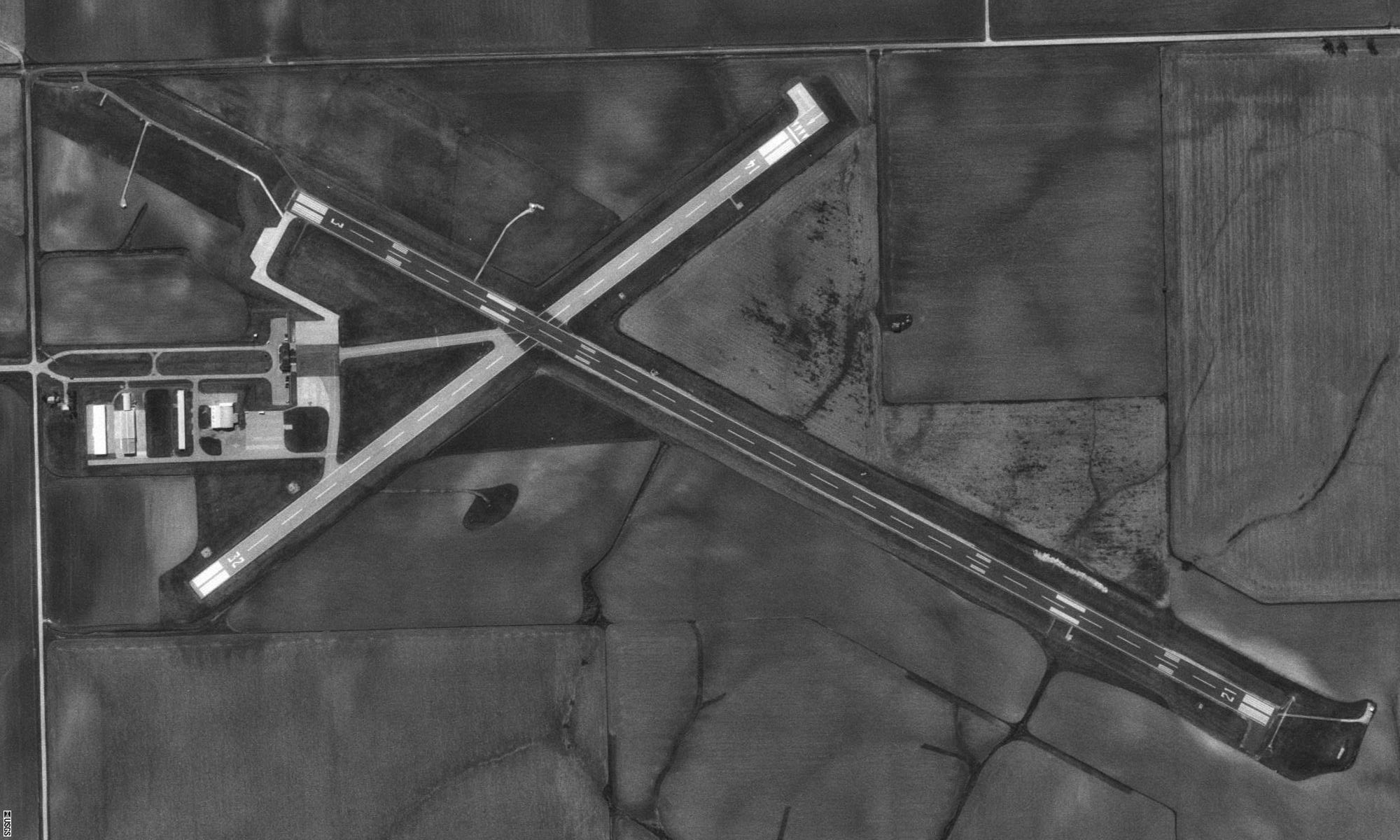
- USGS aerial image, 1994 (north is to the right)
- IATA: CWI; ICAO: KCWI; FAA LID: CWI

Summary
- Airport type: Public
- Owner: City of Clinton
- Serves: Clinton, Iowa
- Elevation AMSL: 708 ft (216 m)
- Coordinates: 41°49′52″N 090°19′45″W
- Website: www.clintonairport.us

Map
- Location within Iowa Location within the United States

Runways
Direction	Length		Surface
Direction	ft	m	Surface
3/21	5,204	1,586	Asphalt
14/32	4,201	1,280	Asphalt

Statistics
- Aircraft operations (2015): 15,400
- Based aircraft (2017): 40
- Source: Federal Aviation Administration

Clinton Municipal Airport (IATA: CWI, ICAO: KCWI, FAA LID: CWI) is seven miles southwest of Clinton, in Clinton County, Iowa. The FAA's National Plan of Integrated Airport Systems (2017-2021) categorizes it as a general aviation airport.

Clinton had scheduled airline flights from 1951-52 until 1975: Braniff until 1955, then Ozark. There was still commercial air service to Clinton into the mid-1980s. The Official Airline Guide in February 1985 showed a total of five weekday departures to O'Hare International in Chicago; Three via American Central and two via Great Lakes. Scheduled passenger service to Clinton was discontinued by the late 1980s.

== Facilities ==
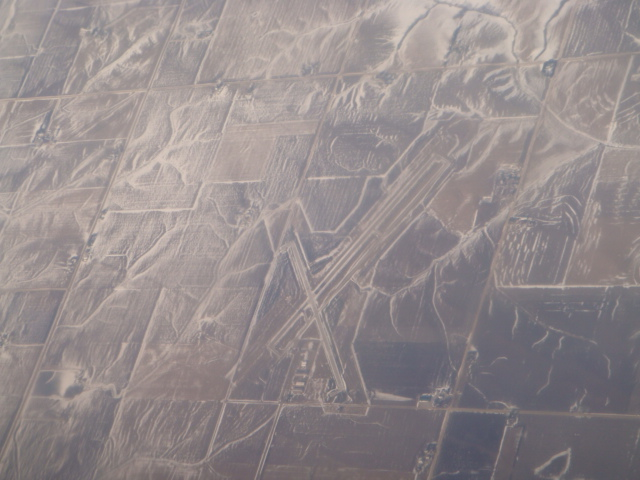
Clinton Municipal Airport, January 2011

Clinton Municipal Airport covers 556 acres (225 ha) at an elevation of 708 feet (216 m). It has two asphalt runways: 3/21 is 5,204 by 100 feet (1,586 x 30 m) and 14/32 is 4,201 by 100 feet (1,280 x 30 m).

In the year ending September 10, 2015 the airport had 15,400 aircraft operations, average 42 per day: 95% general aviation, 3% military and 2% air taxi. In April 2017, 40 aircraft were based at the airport: 30 single-engine, 3 multi-engine, 1 jet and 6 ultralight.

== Other uses ==
The airport is the site of the annual Cessna 150 and Cessna 152 fly-in, which began in 2001. The fly-in is open to owners, pilots and enthusiasts who share a common interest in those types of airplanes.

== See also ==
- List of airports in Iowa
- Clinton Municipal Transit Administration
