= Woodbine Municipal Airport (Iowa) =

- IATA: none; ICAO: none; FAA LID: 3Y4

Summary
- Airport type: Public
- Owner: City of Woodbine
- Serves: Woodbine, Iowa
- Elevation AMSL: 1,068 ft / 326 m
- Coordinates: 41°44′10″N 095°41′01″W

Map
- Location of airport in Iowa 3Y4 (the United States)

Runways
Direction	Length		Surface
Direction	ft	m	Surface
17/35	2,045	623	Turf

Statistics (2007)
- Aircraft operations: 560
- Source: Federal Aviation Administration

Woodbine Municipal Airport (FAA LID: 3Y4) is a city-owned public-use airport located one nautical mile (2 km) east of the central business district of Woodbine, a city in Harrison County, Iowa, United States.

== Facilities and aircraft ==
Woodbine Municipal Airport covers an area of 20 acres (8.1 ha) at an elevation of 1,068 feet (326 m) above mean sea level. It has one runway designated 17/35 with a 2,045 by 95 feet (623 x 29 m) turf surface. For the 12-month period ending September 17, 2007, the airport had 560 aircraft operations, an average of 46 per month, all of which were general aviation.

== See also ==
- List of airports in Iowa
