= Winterset Municipal Airport =

- IATA: none; ICAO: none; FAA LID: 3Y3

Summary
- Airport type: Public
- Owner: Winterset Airport Authority
- Serves: Winterset, Iowa
- Elevation AMSL: 1,116 ft / 340 m
- Coordinates: 41°21′47″N 094°01′16″W

Map
- Location of airport in Iowa / United States 3Y3 (the United States)

Runways
Direction	Length		Surface
Direction	ft	m	Surface
14/32	3,002	915	Asphalt

Statistics (2020)
- Aircraft operations (year ending 9/25/2020): 6,750
- Based aircraft: 23
- Source: Federal Aviation Administration

Winterset Municipal Airport (FAA LID: 3Y3) is a public use airport located two nautical miles (4 km) north of the central business district of Winterset, a city in Madison County, Iowa, United States. Formerly known as Winterset-Madison County Airport, it is owned by the Winterset Airport Authority. This airport is included in the National Plan of Integrated Airport Systems for 2011–2015, which categorized it as a general aviation facility.

== Facilities and aircraft ==
Winterset Municipal Airport covers an area of 33 acres (13 ha) at an elevation of 1,116 feet (340 m) above mean sea level. It has one runway designated 14/32 with an asphalt surface measuring 3,002 by 50 feet (915 x 15 m).

For the 12-month period ending September 25, 2020, the airport had 6,750 general aviation aircraft operations, an average of 129 per week. At that time there were 23 aircraft based at this airport: 21 single-engine and 2 multi-engine.

== See also ==
- List of airports in Iowa
