= Independence Municipal Airport (Iowa) =

Airport in Iowa, United States

- IATA: none; ICAO: KIIB; FAA LID: IIB

Summary
- Airport type: Public
- Owner: City of Independence
- Serves: Independence, Iowa
- Elevation AMSL: 979 ft (298 m)
- Coordinates: 42°27′25″N 091°56′52″W

Map
- Location of airport in Iowa/United States IIB (the United States)

Runways
Direction	Length		Surface
Direction	ft	m	Surface
18/36	5,500	1,676	Concrete

Statistics (2009)
- Aircraft operations: 9,100
- Based aircraft: 24
- Source: Federal Aviation Administration

Independence Municipal Airport (ICAO: KIIB, FAA LID: IIB) is a city-owned public-use airport located three nautical miles (6 km) southwest of the central business district of Independence, a city in Buchanan County, Iowa, United States. As per the FAA's National Plan of Integrated Airport Systems for 2009-2013, it is classified as a general aviation airport.

Although most U.S. airports use the same three-letter location identifier for the FAA and IATA, this airport is assigned IIB by the FAA but has no designation from the IATA.

== Facilities and aircraft ==
Independence Municipal Airport covers an area of 161 acres (65 ha) at an elevation of 979 feet (298 m) above mean sea level. It has one runway designated 18/36 with a concrete surface measuring 5,500 by 100 feet (1,676 x 30 m).

For the 12-month period ending March 26, 2009, the airport had 9,100 aircraft operations, an average of 24 per day: 87% general aviation, 12% military and 1% air taxi. At that time there were 24 aircraft based at this airport: 79% single-engine, 4% multi-engine and 17% ultralight.

== See also ==
- List of airports in Iowa
