= Clarion Municipal Airport =

Airport in Iowa, United States

- IATA: none; ICAO: KCAV; FAA LID: CAV

Summary
- Airport type: Public
- Owner: City of Clarion
- Serves: Clarion, Iowa
- Elevation AMSL: 1,162 ft (354 m)
- Coordinates: 42°44′31″N 093°45′32″W

Map
- Location of airport in Iowa/United States CAV (the United States)

Runways
Direction	Length		Surface
Direction	ft	m	Surface
14/32	3,515	1,071	Concrete

Statistics (2009)
- Aircraft operations: 3,750
- Based aircraft: 12
- Source: Federal Aviation Administration

Clarion Municipal Airport (ICAO: KCAV, FAA LID: CAV) is a city-owned public-use airport located one nautical mile (1.85 km) northwest of the central business district of Clarion, a city in Wright County, Iowa, United States. This airport is included in the FAA's National Plan of Integrated Airport Systems for 2009–2013, which categorized it as a general aviation facility.

Although many U.S. airports use the same three-letter location identifier for the FAA and IATA, this facility is assigned CAV by the FAA but has no designation from the IATA (which assigned CAV to Cazombo Airport in Angola).

== Facilities and aircraft ==
Clarion Municipal Airport covers an area of 255 acres (103 ha) at an elevation of 1,162 feet (354 m) above mean sea level. It has one runway designated 14/32 with a concrete surface measuring 3,515 by 60 feet (1,071 x 18 m).

For the 12-month period ending May 6, 2009, the airport had 3,750 general aviation aircraft operations, an average of 10 per day. At that time there were 12 aircraft based at this airport: 75% single-engine, 17% multi-engine and 8% ultralight.

== See also ==
- List of airports in Iowa
