= Iowa City Municipal Airport =

Civil airport with no airline service

- IATA: IOW; ICAO: KIOW

Summary
- Airport type: Public
- Owner: City of Iowa City
- Serves: Iowa City, Iowa
- Elevation AMSL: 683 ft (208 m)
- Coordinates: 41°38′21″N 91°32′47″W

Map
- Location within Iowa Location within the United States

Runways
Direction	Length		Surface
Direction	ft	m	Surface
7/25	5,002	1,525	Concrete
12/30	3,900	1,189	Concrete

Statistics
- Aircraft operations (2016): 19,287
- Based aircraft (2017): 73
- Source: Federal Aviation Administration, Airnav.com

Iowa City Municipal Airport (IATA: IOW, ICAO: KIOW, FAA LID: IOW), is two miles southwest of downtown Iowa City, in Johnson County, Iowa. It is the oldest civil airport west of the Mississippi River still in its original location.

The Federal Aviation Administration (FAA) National Plan of Integrated Airport Systems for 2017–2021 categorized it as a regional general aviation facility.

The airport has no scheduled airline service; the closest airline airport is The Eastern Iowa Airport in Cedar Rapids, about 19 miles (31 km) northwest. In the 1920s Iowa City was on the original transcontinental air route, flown by Boeing Air Transport, a United predecessor. On March 1, 1959, United was replaced by Ozark, which pulled out of Iowa City in April 1970.

== Facilities ==
The airport covers 450 acres (180 ha) at an elevation of 683 feet (208 m). It has two concrete runways: 7/25 is 5,002 by 100 feet (1,525 x 30 m); 12/30 is 3,900 by 75 feet (1,189 x 23 m). The airport has approved GPS and VOR Instrument approaches.

In the year ending September 14, 2016 the airport had 19,287 aircraft operations, average 53 per day: 87% general aviation, 11% air taxi, and 1% military. In December 2017, 73 aircraft were based at the airport: 61 single-engine, 3 multi-engine, 7 jet, 1 helicopter, and 1 glider.

There is an airport terminal building, an aircraft maintenance shop, two corporate hangar buildings, a multi-plane hangar with attached office area, and five buildings with 60 individual hangars (T-hangars).

The FBO at Iowa City is Jet Air. Full line services are available, as well as flight training, charter services, and aircraft maintenance. Jet maintains a fleet of newer Cessna 172S and 172R for rental and training. There is no tie down or handling fee at this location. There is also a self serve 100LL pump located at the main ramp available 24/7.

== Procedures, frequencies, and operations ==
The Iowa City CTAF and UNICOM are on a combined frequency of 122.80. The airfield does have a ASOS Weather System installed on site (Located in the center of the field), which can be reached 24/7 on frequency 128.075 or by calling 319-339-9491. Runway 25 is the designated calm wind runway, and has a 806 ft displaced threshold. Both Runway 25 and Runway 30 have published RNAV instrument approaches, however no instrument approaches are available for Runways 7 or 12. No ILS/LOC approaches are available at IOW, and there are no plans at time of writing to install such a system. Runway 7/25 features PAPI pilot-controlled approach lighting as well as REIL lighting. All active runways have medium intensity edge lighting, which is also pilot controlled (via 122.8).

Runways 25 and 30 are designated as left traffic pattern (TPA 1700 MSL), while Runways 12 and 7 have right traffic patterns to avoid overflight of the city. Fixed wing aircraft should caution that Runway 18/36 is inactive, and can only be used for helicopter operations. Runway 18/36 has not been maintained for well over a decade, and does have large sections of concrete removed.

Aircraft landing at Iowa City should caution medical helicopter operations 1 mile north of the airport at the University of Iowa.

== See also ==
- List of airports in Iowa
