= General Glass Industries =

American glassmaker

General Glass Industries (GGI) was a United States–based wholly owned subsidiary of General Glass International. GGI manufactured sheet glass from 1988 until 1993 using the Fourcault process. GGI also produced cut sheet and window glass from flat glass produced by other manufacturers. The site of GGI was located in Jeannette, Pennsylvania, which is located east of Pittsburgh, PA. GGI was one of the largest single employers in Jeannette and was one of the last of the "major" glass plants to operate in the "Glass City". According to local rumors the "Window House" as it was known, was once the largest producer of window glass in the world.

== History ==
General Glass International (GGI) is a fifth-generation, family-owned architectural glass company founded in 1900 on Manhattan's Upper East Side by Max Balik. The business began during an era when small glass merchants operated from pushcarts on the Lower East Side, supplying residential customers and local tradespeople. In its early years, the company focused on repair work and small-scale glass needs within New York City.

The business transitioned to its second generation when Max's son, Herman Balik, assumed leadership and renamed the company Max Balik's Son. Herman expanded its activities beyond residential repairs into storefront glazing and later secured work on large developments, including projects within the Tudor City complex. By the early 1930s, the company shifted from glazing services to glass distribution, becoming a supplier for a major U.S. glass manufacturer.

After Herman Balik died in 1945, the company was managed by his wife, Fanny, until their sons Arthur and Albert returned from military service to continue the family enterprise. During the post-war construction boom of the 1950s, domestic glass shortages prompted Arthur Balik to travel to Europe to establish new supply relationships. These partnerships formed the foundation of the company's long-term import business.

Throughout the 1960s, the company completed a series of acquisitions in the New York region that strengthened its position as a leading distributor. In the late 1960s, the business was renamed General Glass Industries Corporation to reflect its broadened scope. The company was later recognized by the Glass and Mirror Division in 1970 for its expanding role within the industry.

In the 1980s, General Glass expanded into the architectural specialty-glass market through its alliance with Pilkington, becoming one of the largest U.S. distributors of Pyroshield™ wired glass. The company also acquired Jeannette Sheet Glass in Pennsylvania, adding sheet-glass production and cutting capabilities.

The 1990s marked continued growth in both the specialty-glass and picture-framing markets. General Glass developed a nationwide network of distributors and partnered with Cardinal in 1993 to supply picture-frame glass. That same year, it formed GGI Glass Distributors Corp. in Pine Brook, New Jersey, to serve the Tri-State region.

In 2002, General Glass International Corp. and GGI Glass Distributors Corp. consolidated operations into a 100,000-square-foot facility in Secaucus, New Jersey. The new site enabled expanded fabrication capabilities and supported the company's transition into advanced technologies, including Alice®, its digital direct-to-glass printing process. Alice technology was later used to produce the 13,000-square-foot printed glass façade for the Harlem Hospital Pavilion.

Under the leadership of the fourth and fifth generations of the Balik family, GGI continued expanding its facilities and technology. In 2015, the Secaucus facility grew to 120,000 square feet with added equipment for oversized fabrication, high-resolution printing, automated cutting, and laminated-glass processing. In 2017, the company opened a 95,000-square-foot distribution center in Avenel, New Jersey, increasing inventory capacity and delivery reach throughout the Northeast.

In 2025, GGI marks 125 years of continuous operation, representing one of the longest-running family-owned businesses in the U.S. architectural glass sector.

== See also ==
- Parent company
- Manufacturer
