= Monticello Regional Airport =

Coordinates: 42°13′13″N 091°09′48″W

- IATA: MXO; ICAO: KMXO; FAA LID: MXO

Summary
- Airport type: Public
- Owner: City of Monticello
- Serves: Monticello, Iowa
- Elevation AMSL: 833 ft / 254 m

Map
- Location of airport in Iowa/United States MXO (the United States)

Runways
Direction	Length		Surface
Direction	ft	m	Surface
15/33	4,400	1,341	Concrete
9/27	2,316	706	Turf

Statistics
- Aircraft operations (2013): 10,850
- Based aircraft (2016): 34
- Source: Federal Aviation Administration

Monticello Regional Airport (IATA: MXO, ICAO: KMXO, FAA LID: MXO), formerly known as Monticello Municipal Airport, is a public airport located two miles (3 km) southeast of the central business district of Monticello, a city in Jones County, Iowa, United States. It is owned by the City of Monticello.

== Facilities and aircraft ==
Monticello Regional Airport covers an area of 300 acres (120 ha) which contains two runways: 15/33 with a concrete pavement measuring 4,400 x 75 ft (1,341 x 23 m) and 9/27 with a turf surface measuring 2,316 x 90 ft (706 x 27 m). For the 12-month period ending May 15, 2013, the airport had 10,850 general aviation aircraft operations, an average of 30 per day. In September 2016, there were 34 aircraft based at this airport: 27 single-engine, 5 multi-engine and 2 ultra-light.

== Accidents and incidents ==
- On July 1, 2017, a small plane with a single passenger crashed in a cornfield approximately 50 yards from the airport runway, causing the death of the pilot.

== See also ==
- List of airports in Iowa
