= Entrepreneurs of Knoxville =

- Formation: April, 2008
- Type: NPO
- Location: Knoxville, TN, United States
- Services: training, networking, joint ventures
- Members: ~950 (as of Feb 2012)
- Key people: Leo Knight (Founder); Wes Daniel; Clif Goodgame; Walter Lounsbery; Jonathan M. Patrick
- Website: Entrepreneurs of Knoxville - Ning; EOK - WordPress

Entrepreneurs of Knoxville (E.O.K.) is a growing non-profit organization of more than 950 members in Knoxville, TN. E.O.K. is an educational and charitable organization committed to the success of each member. E.O.K. also benefits its members by providing strategic networking opportunities. E.O.K. is a grassroots organization focused on small business owners and independent contractors. The group ranges from high-tech individuals to those involved in real estate, non-profits, art, services, and more.

== Programs and Meetings ==
EOK is a user-driven and dynamic organization. The primary focus is on sharing experiences at monthly meetings and small group meetings. Members help members by discussing their challenges and solutions in creating businesses. Programs also include traditional subjects such as funding, patents, sales, marketing, and incorporation.

EOK has also sponsored special community programs. For example, before the 2012 mayoral race in Knoxville, EOK sponsored candidate interviews and meet-and-greets with each candidate. EOK was a key sponsor of the inaugural 2012 "Empowered Teen Entrepreneurship Camp" to be held on the University of Tennessee campus. Other primary sponsors included the UT Anderson Center for Entrepreneurship and Ultimate Life Institute.

== Monthly Events ==
Current EOK members and interested visitors meet monthly in public locations for social and networking events. Monthly meetings are listed on Meetup.

== History ==
E.O.K. was founded in April 2008 by Leonard R. Knight Jr and Chris Austin in Knoxville, TN.
