= Grinnell Regional Airport =

Airport in Grinnell, Iowa

- IATA: none; ICAO: KGGI; FAA LID: GGI

Summary
- Airport type: Public
- Owner: City of Grinnell
- Serves: Grinnell, Iowa
- Elevation AMSL: 1,008 ft (307 m)
- Coordinates: 41°42′35″N 092°44′09″W

Map
- Location of airport in Iowa / United States GGI (the United States)

Runways
Direction	Length		Surface
Direction	ft	m	Surface
13/31	5,200	1,585	Concrete

Statistics
- Aircraft operations (2016): 5,950
- Based aircraft (2017): 14
- Source: Federal Aviation Administration

Grinnell Regional Airport (ICAO: KGGI, FAA LID: GGI), known locally as Billy Robinson Field, is a city-owned public-use airport located one mile (1.6 km) south of the central business district of Grinnell, a city in Poweshiek County, Iowa, United States. It is included in the National Plan of Integrated Airport Systems for 2017–2021, which categorized it as a local general aviation facility.

Although most U.S. airports use the same three-letter location identifier for the FAA and IATA, this airport is assigned GGI by the FAA but has no designation from the IATA.

== Facilities and aircraft ==
Grinnell Regional Airport covers an area of 115 acres (46.5 ha) at an elevation of 1008 feet (307 m) above mean sea level. It has one runway: 13/31 is 5,200 by 75 feet (1,585 x 23 m) with a grooved concrete surface, it also has approved precision instrument approaches.

For the 12-month period ending September 27, 2016, the airport had 5,950 aircraft operations: all general aviation. In December 2017, there were 14 aircraft based at this airport: 13 single-engine and 1 multi-engine.

== See also ==
- List of airports in Iowa
