= Atlantic Municipal Airport =

- IATA: AIO; ICAO: KAIO; FAA LID: AIO

Summary
- Airport type: Public
- Owner: City of Atlantic
- Serves: Atlantic, Iowa
- Elevation AMSL: 1,165 ft (355 m)
- Coordinates: 41°24′26″N 95°02′49″W

Map
- Location of airport in Iowa / United States AIO (the United States)

Runways
Direction	Length		Surface
Direction	ft	m	Surface
2/20	5,000	1,524	Concrete
12/30	3,132	955	Asphalt

Statistics
- Aircraft operations (2016): 8,050
- Based aircraft (2017): 23
- Source: Federal Aviation Administration

Atlantic Municipal Airport (IATA: AIO, ICAO: KAIO, FAA LID: AIO), is a city-owned public-use airport located two miles (3 km) west of the central business district of Atlantic, a city in Cass County, Iowa, United States. The airport has a runway opened in 2006 capable of handling light business jets.

It is included in the National Plan of Integrated Airport Systems for 2017–2021, which categorized it as a local general aviation facility.

== Facilities and aircraft ==
Atlantic Municipal Airport covers an area of 127 acres (51 ha) at an elevation of 1,165 feet (355 m) above mean sea level. It has two runways: 2/20 is 5,000 by 75 feet (1,524 x 23 m) with a concrete surface and approved precision instrument approaches. 12/30 is 3,132 by 75 feet (955 x 23 m) with an asphalt surface.

For the 12-month period ending August 3, 2016, the airport had 8,050 aircraft operations, an average of 22 per day: all general aviation. In December 2017, there were 23 aircraft based at this airport: 20 single-engine and 3 multi-engine.

== See also ==
- List of airports in Iowa
