= Mount Pleasant Municipal Airport (Iowa) =

Airport in Iowa, United States

- IATA: MPZ; ICAO: KMPZ; FAA LID: MPZ

Summary
- Airport type: Public
- Owner: City of Mount Pleasant
- Serves: Mount Pleasant, Iowa
- Elevation AMSL: 730 ft (220 m)
- Coordinates: 40°56′48″N 091°30′40″W

Map
- Location of airport in Iowa/United States MPZ (the United States)

Runways
Direction	Length		Surface
Direction	ft	m	Surface
15/33	4,001	1,220	Asphalt
3/21	1,965	599	Turf

Statistics (2009)
- Aircraft operations: 6,250
- Based aircraft: 19
- Source: Federal Aviation Administration

Mount Pleasant Municipal Airport (IATA: MPZ, ICAO: KMPZ, FAA LID: MPZ) is a city-owned public-use airport located three nautical miles (6 km) southeast of the central business district of Mount Pleasant, a city in Henry County, Iowa, United States. According to the FAA's National Plan of Integrated Airport Systems for 2009–2013, it is categorized as a general aviation facility.

== Facilities and aircraft ==
Mount Pleasant Municipal Airport covers an area of 124 acres (50 ha) at an elevation of 730 feet (223 m) above mean sea level. It has two runways: 15/33 is 4,001 by 75 feet (1,220 x 23 m) with an asphalt; 3/21 is 1,965 by 120 feet (599 x 37 m) with a turf surface.

For the 12-month period ending May 13, 2009, the airport had 6,250 aircraft operations, an average of 17 per day: 96% general aviation and 4% air taxi. At that time there were 19 aircraft based at this airport: 47% single-engine, 42% multi-engine and 11% ultralight.

== See also ==
- List of airports in Iowa
