= Bloomfield Municipal Airport (Iowa) =

- IATA: none; ICAO: none; FAA LID: 4K6

Summary
- Airport type: Public
- Owner: City of Bloomfield
- Serves: Bloomfield, Iowa
- Elevation AMSL: 888 ft (271 m)
- Coordinates: 40°43′56″N 092°25′42″W

Map
- Location of airport in Iowa/United States 4K6 (the United States)

Runways
Direction	Length		Surface
Direction	ft	m	Surface
18/36	3,401	1,037	Concrete

Statistics (2006)
- Aircraft operations: 4,868
- Source: Federal Aviation Administration

Bloomfield Municipal Airport (FAA LID: 4K6) is a city-owned public-use airport located two miles (3 km) southwest of the central business district of Bloomfield, a city in Davis County, Iowa, United States.

== Facilities and aircraft ==
Bloomfield Municipal Airport covers an area of 43 acres (17 ha) and has one runway designated 18/36 with a concrete surface measuring 3,401 by 50 feet (1,037 by 15 m). For the 12-month period ending May 18, 2006, the general aviation airport had 4,868 aircraft operations, an average of 13 per day.

== See also ==
- List of airports in Iowa
