= Iosco County Airport =

Public use airport in East Tawas, Michigan

- IATA: ECA; ICAO: none; FAA LID: 6D9

Summary
- Airport type: Civil
- Owner/Operator: Iosco County
- Serves: East Tawas
- Time zone: UTC−05:00 (-5)
  - Summer (DST): UTC−04:00 (-4)
- Elevation AMSL: 605.3 ft / 184.5 m
- Coordinates: 44°18′46″N 83°25′20″W

Maps
- Location of airport in Michigan Iosco County Airport (the United States)
- Interactive map of Iosco County Airport

Runways
Direction	Length		Surface
Direction	ft	m	Surface
8/26	4,802	1,464	Asphalt

Statistics (2019)
- Aircraft movements: 3224

Iosco County Airport (IATA: ECA, FAA LID: 6D9) is a publicly owned, public use airport located 3 miles northeast of East Tawas, Michigan, United States, in Iosco County. The airport is on 276 acres at an elevation of 605.3 ft (184.5 m).

The airport is home to a flying club that offers aircraft rental and regular events for members. The club holds annual fly-ins that offer breakfast and aircraft displays.

== History ==
The airport was moved to its current location in 1962. The airport received federal funding until 1993, when the Wurtsmith Air Force Base closed.

The airport was home to a stop on the Wings of Mercy tour in 2022 to help raise funds to operate additional medical flights. Proceeds help patients fly for free to places where they obtain medical treatment.

== Facilities and aircraft ==
The airport has one runway, designated as runway 8/26. It measures 4802 x 75 ft (1464 x 23 m) and is paved with asphalt. For the 12-month period ending December 31, 2019, the airport has 3,224 aircraft operations annually, an average of 62 per week. All the traffic consists of general aviation. For the same period, there were 25 aircraft based on the field, all airplanes: 24 single-engine and 1 multi-engine.

The airport has a fixed-base operator that offers fuel and limited amenities.

== Accidents and incidents ==
- On August 13, 2008, a Piper PA-34 Seneca inadvertently landed gear-up at the airport. The pilot noted that he had failed to lower the landing gear during the before-landing checklist. The probable cause was found to be the pilot's failure to lower the landing gear prior to touchdown.

== See also ==
- List of airports in Michigan
