= Corning Municipal Airport (Iowa) =

Airport in Iowa, United States

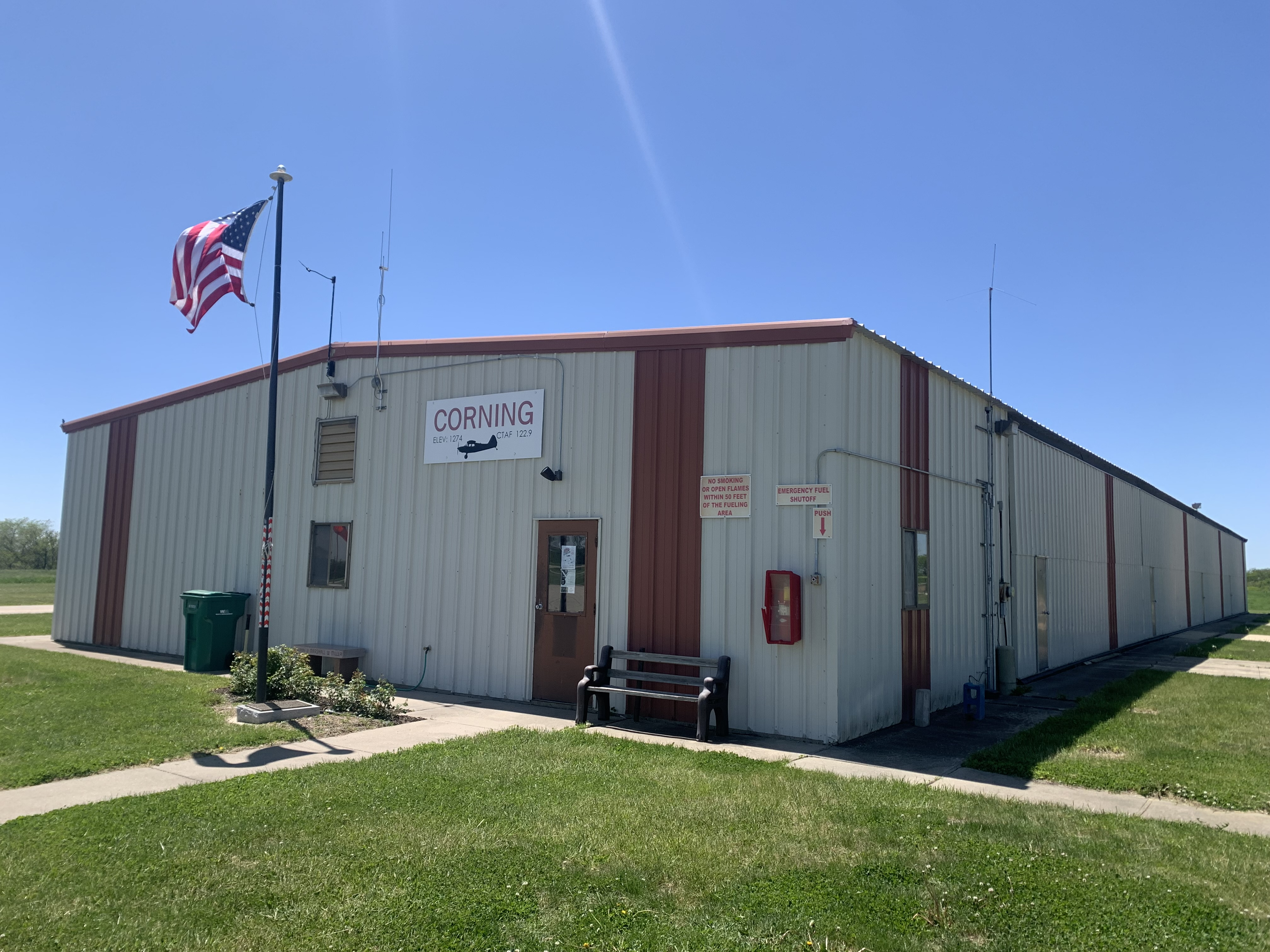
- IATA: none; ICAO: KCRZ; FAA LID: CRZ

Summary
- Airport type: Public
- Owner: City of Corning
- Serves: Corning, Iowa
- Elevation AMSL: 1,274 ft (388 m)
- Coordinates: 40°59′39″N 094°45′18″W

Map
- Location of airport in Iowa CRZ (the United States)

Runways
Direction	Length		Surface
Direction	ft	m	Surface
18/36	2,684	818	Concrete

Statistics (2010)
- Aircraft operations: 2,000
- Based aircraft: 7
- Source: Federal Aviation Administration

Corning Municipal Airport (ICAO: KCRZ, FAA LID: CRZ) is a city-owned public-use airport located one nautical mile (2 km) west of the central business district of Corning, a city in Adams County, Iowa, United States.

Although many U.S. airports use the same three-letter location identifier for the FAA and IATA, this airport is assigned CRZ by the FAA but has no designation from the IATA (which assigned CRZ to Turkmenabat Airport in Turkmenistan).

== Facilities and aircraft ==
Corning Municipal Airport covers an area of 56 acres (23 ha) at an elevation of 1,274 feet (388 m) above mean sea level. It has one runway designated 18/36 with a concrete surface measuring 2,684 by 50 feet (818 x 15 m).

For the 12-month period ending June 22, 2010, the airport had 2,000 general aviation aircraft operations, an average of 166 per month. At that time there were seven single-engine aircraft based at this airport.

== See also ==
- List of airports in Iowa
