= Webster City Municipal Airport =

Airport in Iowa, United States

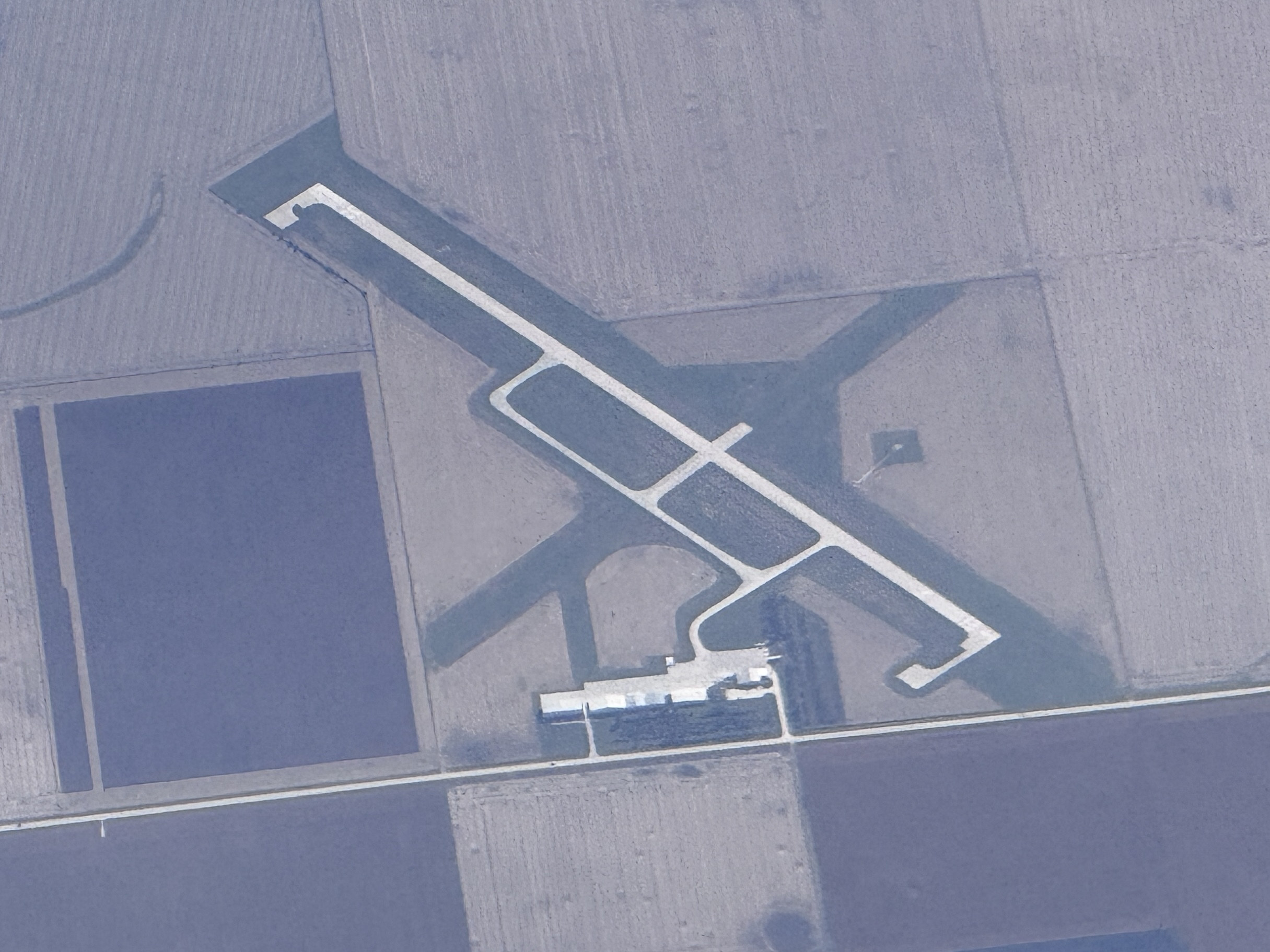
- IATA: EBS; ICAO: KEBS; FAA LID: EBS

Summary
- Airport type: Public
- Owner: City of Webster City
- Serves: Webster City, Iowa
- Elevation AMSL: 1,122 ft / 342 m
- Coordinates: 42°26′11″N 093°52′09″W

Map
- Location of airport in Iowa/United States EBS (the United States)

Runways
Direction	Length		Surface
Direction	ft	m	Surface
14/32	4,007	1,221	Concrete
5/23	2,662	811	Turf

Statistics (2010)
- Aircraft operations: 11,250
- Based aircraft: 15
- Source: Federal Aviation Administration

Webster City Municipal Airport (IATA: EBS, ICAO: KEBS, FAA LID: EBS) is a city-owned public-use airport located three nautical miles (6 km) southwest of the central business district of Webster City, in Hamilton County, Iowa, United States. It is included in the National Plan of Integrated Airport Systems for 2015–2019, which categorized it as a general aviation facility.

== Facilities and aircraft ==
Webster City Municipal Airport covers an area of 181 acres (73 ha) at an elevation of 1,122 feet (342 m) above mean sea level. It has two runways: 14/32 is 4,007 by 75 feet (1,221 x 23 m) with a concrete surface and 5/23 is 2,662 by 90 feet (811 x 27 m) with a turf surface.

For the 12-month period ending September 20, 2010, the airport had 11,250 aircraft operations, an average of 30 per day: 98.5% general aviation and 1.5% air taxi. At that time there were 15 aircraft based at this airport: 80% single-engine and 20% multi-engine.

== See also ==
- List of airports in Iowa
