= Osceola Municipal Airport (Iowa) =

- IATA: none; ICAO: none; FAA LID: I75

Summary
- Airport type: Public
- Owner: City of Osceola
- Serves: Osceola, Iowa
- Elevation AMSL: 1,115 ft / 340 m
- Coordinates: 41°03′08″N 093°41′21″W

Map
- Location of airport in Iowa/United States I75 (the United States)

Runways
Direction	Length		Surface
Direction	ft	m	Surface
18/36	4,001	1,220	Concrete

Statistics (2010)
- Aircraft operations: 5,750
- Based aircraft: 27
- Source: Federal Aviation Administration

Osceola Municipal Airport (FAA LID: I75) is a city-owned public-use airport located four nautical miles (5 mi, 7 km) northeast of the central business district of Osceola, a city in Clarke County, Iowa, United States. It is included in the National Plan of Integrated Airport Systems for 2011–2015, which categorized it as a general aviation facility.

== Facilities and aircraft ==
Osceola Municipal Airport covers an area of 81 acres (33 ha) at an elevation of 1,115 feet (340 m) above mean sea level. It has one runway designated 18/36 with a concrete surface measuring 4,001 by 75 feet (1,220 x 23 m).

For the 12-month period ending June 21, 2010, the airport had 5,750 general aviation aircraft operations, an average of 15 per day. At that time there were 27 aircraft based at this airport: 93% single-engine and 7% ultralight.

== See also ==
- List of airports in Iowa
