= Marion Airport =

- IATA: none; ICAO: none; FAA LID: C17

Summary
- Airport type: Public use
- Owner: City of Marion - managed by Perry & Jan Walton
- Serves: Marion, Iowa
- Elevation AMSL: 862 ft / 263 m
- Coordinates: 42°01′47″N 091°31′54″W

Map
- Location of airport in Iowa C17 (the United States)

Runways
| Direction | Length | | Surface |
| Direction | ft | m | Surface |
|---|---|---|---|
| 17/35 | 3,775 | 1,151 | Asphalt/turf |

Statistics (2010)
- Aircraft operations: 11,372
- Based aircraft: 51
- Source: Federal Aviation Administration

Marion Airport (FAA LID: C17) is a city-owned, public-use airport located three nautical miles (6 km) east of the central business district of Marion, a city in Linn County, Iowa, United States.

== Facilities and aircraft ==
Marion Airport covers an area of 40 acres (16 ha) at an elevation of 862 feet (263 m) above mean sea level. It has one runway designated 17/35 with an asphalt and turf surface measuring 3,775 by 100 feet. The width has 26 feet of center pavement, with the remainder being turf.

For the 12-month period ending August 26, 2010, the airport had 11,372 aircraft operations, an average of 31 per day: 99% general aviation, 1% air taxi, and <1% military. At that time there were 51 aircraft based at this airport: 76% single-engine, 8% helicopter, 8% ultralight, 6% multi-engine, and 2% glider.

In October 2019 expansion started to extend the main runway to 3,775 ft. long. It was completed July 28, 2020.

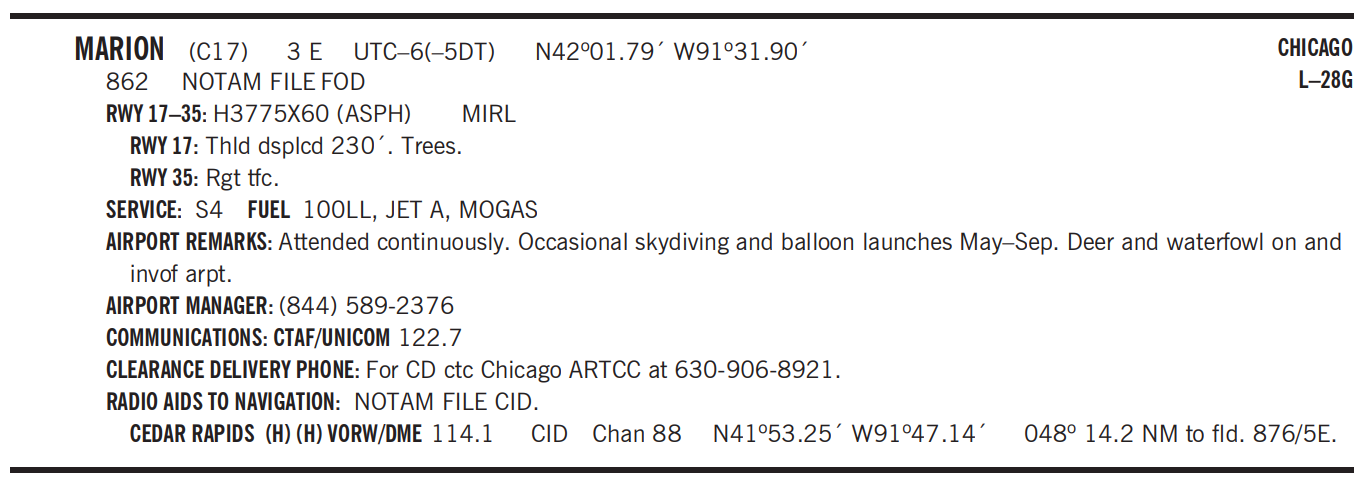
Chart Supplement excerpt for the Marion Airport (C17)

== See also ==
- List of airports in Iowa
