= Estherville Municipal Airport =

- IATA: EST; ICAO: KEST; FAA LID: EST

Summary
- Airport type: Public
- Owner: City of Estherville
- Serves: Estherville, Iowa
- Elevation AMSL: 1,318.8 ft (402.0 m)
- Coordinates: 43°24′26.9″N 094°44′47″W

Map
- Location of airport in Iowa/United States EST (the United States)

Runways
Direction	Length		Surface
Direction	ft	m	Surface
16/34	4,797	1,462	Concrete
06/24	2,989	911	Turf
- Source: Federal Aviation Administration

Estherville Municipal Airport (IATA: EST, ICAO: KEST, FAA LID: EST) is a public general aviation airport located four miles (six kilometers) east of Estherville, Emmet County, Iowa, United States. It is owned by the City of Estherville.

== Facilities and aircraft ==
Estherville Municipal Airport covers an area of 400 acres (160 ha) which contains two runways: 16/34 with a concrete pavement measuring 4,797 by 75 ft (1,462 by 23 m) and 06/24 with a turf surface measuring 2,989 by 90 ft (911 by 27 m). As of October 6, 2022, there were 18 aircraft based there, including 17 single-engine and one twin-engine. For the 12-month period ending September 4, 2020, there were an average of 24 aircraft operations per day, all of which were general aviation. The airport hosts flight training for students of Iowa Lakes Community College's aviation program.

== See also ==
- List of airports in Iowa
