= Humboldt Municipal Airport (Iowa) =

- IATA: HUD; ICAO: none; FAA LID: 0K7

Summary
- Airport type: Public
- Owner: City of Humboldt
- Serves: Humboldt, Iowa
- Elevation AMSL: 1,093 ft (333 m)
- Coordinates: 42°44′10″N 094°14′43″W

Map
- Location of airport in Iowa/United States 0K7 (the United States)

Runways
Direction	Length		Surface
Direction	ft	m	Surface
12/30	3,417	1,042	Asphalt

Statistics (2008)
- Aircraft operations: 4,000
- Based aircraft: 12
- Source: Federal Aviation Administration

Humboldt Municipal Airport (IATA: HUD, FAA LID: 0K7) is a city-owned public-use airport located one nautical mile (1.85 km) west of the central business district of Humboldt, a city in Humboldt County, Iowa, United States. According to the FAA's National Plan of Integrated Airport Systems for 2009–2013, it is classified as a general aviation airport.

== Facilities and aircraft ==
Humboldt Municipal Airport covers an area of 50 acres (20 ha) at an elevation of 1,093 feet (333 m) above mean sea level. It has one runway designated 12/30 with an asphalt surface measuring 3,417 by 60 feet (1,042 x 18 m).

For the 12-month period ending July 25, 2008, the airport had 4,000 general aviation aircraft operations, an average of 10 per day. At that time there were 12 aircraft based at this airport, all single-engine.

== See also ==
- List of airports in Iowa
