= Eliye Springs Airport =

- IATA: EYS; ICAO: HKES

Summary
- Airport type: Public, Civilian
- Owner: Kenya Airports Authority
- Serves: Eliye Springs
- Location: Eliye Springs, Kenya
- Elevation AMSL: 1,395 ft / 425 m
- Coordinates: 03°14′11″N 035°58′28″E

Map
- Location of the airport in Kenya

Runways
Direction	Length		Surface
Direction	ft	m	Surface
09/27	2,740	835	Asphalt

Eliye Springs Airport (IATA: EYS, ICAO: HKES) is an airport in the Turkana County, Kenya.

== Location ==
Eliye Springs Airport is located in Eliye Springs, a village in Turkana County in northwestern Kenya, on the western shores of Lake Turkana.

By air, Eliye Springs Airport is situated approximately 530 kilometres (330 mi), by air, northwest of Nairobi International Airport, Kenya's largest civilian airport. The geographic coordinates of this airport are:3° 13' 12.00"N, 36° 0' 0.00"E (Latitude:3.220000; Longitude:36.000000).

== Overview ==
Eliye Springs Airport is a small civilian airport, serving the village of Eliye Springs. Situated at 425 metres (1,394 ft) above sea level, the airport has a single unpaved runway measuring 835 metres (2,740 ft) in length.

== Airlines and destinations ==
None at the moment.

== See also ==
- Eliye Springs
- Lodwar
- Turkana District
- Rift Valley Province
- Kenya Airports Authority
- Kenya Civil Aviation Authority
- List of airports in Kenya
