= Red Oak Municipal Airport =

Airport in Iowa, United States

- IATA: none; ICAO: KRDK; FAA LID: RDK

Summary
- Airport type: Public
- Owner: City of Red Oak
- Serves: Red Oak, Iowa
- Elevation AMSL: 1,045 ft (319 m)
- Coordinates: 41°00′39″N 095°15′32″W

Map
- Location of airport in Iowa/United States RDK (the United States)

Runways
Direction	Length		Surface
Direction	ft	m	Surface
5/23	5,100	1,554	Concrete
17/35	2,901	884	Concrete
13/31	2,050	625	Turf

Statistics (2007)
- Aircraft operations: 11,550
- Based aircraft: 34
- Source: Federal Aviation Administration

Red Oak Municipal Airport (ICAO: KRDK, FAA LID: RDK) is a city-owned public-use airport located two nautical miles (3.7 km) west of the central business district of Red Oak, a city in Montgomery County, Iowa, United States. According to the FAA's National Plan of Integrated Airport Systems for 2009–2013, it is categorized as a general aviation facility.

Although many U.S. airports use the same three-letter location identifier for the FAA and IATA, this facility is assigned RDK by the FAA but has no designation from the IATA.

== Facilities and aircraft ==
Red Oak Municipal Airport covers an area of 202 acres (82 ha) at an elevation of 1,045 feet (319 m) above mean sea level. It has three concrete paved runways: 5/23 is 5,100 by 75 feet (1,554 x 23 m) and 17/35 is 2,901 by 60 feet (884 x 18 m). It also has a turf runway designated 13/31 which is 2,050 by 210 feet (625 x 64 m).

For the 12-month period ending August 8, 2007, the airport had 11,550 general aviationaircraft operations, an average of 31 per day. At that time there were 34 aircraft based at this airport: 79% single-engine, 3% multi-engine and 18% ultralight.

== See also ==
- List of airports in Iowa
