= Creston Municipal Airport =

Airport in Iowa, United States

- IATA: CSQ; ICAO: KCSQ; FAA LID: CSQ

Summary
- Airport type: Public
- Owner: City of Creston
- Serves: Creston, Iowa
- Elevation AMSL: 1,300 ft (400 m)
- Coordinates: 41°01′17″N 094°21′48″W
- Website: www.CrestonIowa.gov/...

Map
- Location of airport in Iowa/United States CSQ (the United States)

Runways
Direction	Length		Surface
Direction	ft	m	Surface
16/34	4,901	1,494	Asphalt
4/22	1,692	516	Turf

Statistics (2010)
- Aircraft operations: 4,500
- Based aircraft: 17
- Source: Federal Aviation Administration

Creston Municipal Airport (IATA: CSQ, ICAO: KCSQ, FAA LID: CSQ) is a city-owned public-use airport located three nautical miles (6 km) south of the central business district of Creston, a city in Union County, Iowa, United States. It is included in the National Plan of Integrated Airport Systems for 2011–2015, which categorized it as a general aviation facility.

== Facilities and aircraft ==
Creston Municipal Airport covers an area of 360 acres (146 ha) at an elevation of 1,300 feet (396 m) above mean sea level. It has two runways: 16/34 is 4,901 by 75 feet (1,494 x 23 m) with an asphalt surface and 4/22 is 1,692 by 100 feet (516 x 30 m) with a turf surface.

For the 12-month period ending September 16, 2010, the airport had 4,500 general aviation aircraft operations, an average of 12 per day. At that time there were 17 aircraft based at this airport: 94% single-engine and 6% ultralight.

== See also ==
- List of airports in Iowa
