= Marion County Airport =

Marion County Airport may refer to:

- Marion County – Rankin Fite Airport in Hamilton, Alabama, United States (FAA: HAB)
- Dunnellon/Marion County Airport in Dunnellon, Florida, United States (FAA: X35)
- Marion County Airport (Georgia) in Buena Vista, Georgia, United States (FAA: 82A)
- Marion County Airport (South Carolina) in Marion, South Carolina, United States (FAA: MAO)
- Marion County Airport (Tennessee) in Jasper, Tennessee, United States (FAA: APT)
