= Corning Municipal Airport (California) =

Airport in California, United States

- IATA: none; ICAO: none; FAA LID: 0O4

Summary
- Airport type: Public
- Owner: City of Corning
- Serves: Corning, California
- Elevation AMSL: 293 ft (89 m)
- Coordinates: 39°56′37″N 122°10′16″W

Map
- Location in California

Runways
Direction	Length		Surface
Direction	ft	m	Surface
17/35	2,702	824	Asphalt

Statistics (2011)
- Aircraft operations: 8,718
- Based aircraft: 23
- Source: Federal Aviation Administration

Corning Municipal Airport (FAA LID: 0O4) is located one mile northeast of Corning, in Tehama County, California, United States. The National Plan of Integrated Airport Systems for 2011–2015 categorized it as a general aviation facility.

== Facilities ==
The airport covers 77 acres (31 ha) at an elevation of 293 feet (89 m). Its one runway, 17/35, is 2,702 by 50 feet (824 x 15 m) asphalt.

In 2011 the airport had 8,718 aircraft operations, average 23 per day: 99% general aviation and 1% air taxi. 23 aircraft were then based at this airport: 74% single-engine and 26% ultralight.
