= Eliye Springs =

Village in Kenya

Coordinates: 3.235769°N 36.022198°E

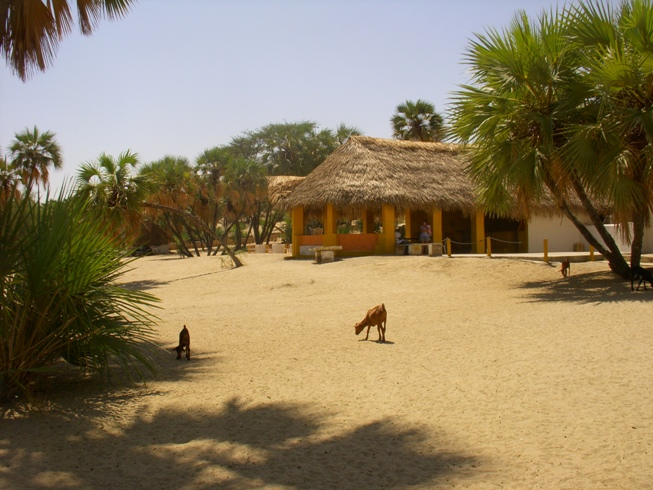
Eliye Springs Hotel Resort, Turkana

Eliye Springs, also known as Ille Springs, is a remote village on the western shore of Lake Turkana in Kenya, near the mouth of Turkwel River. It is located 50 kilometres east of Lodwar and 40 kilometres south of Kalokol.

The local springs for which it is named produce lush vegetation along its section of the otherwise barren lakeshore and support a community of about 5000 people with fresh drinking water. However, due to neglect, the spring's water has been found to have E. coli and other harmful agents.

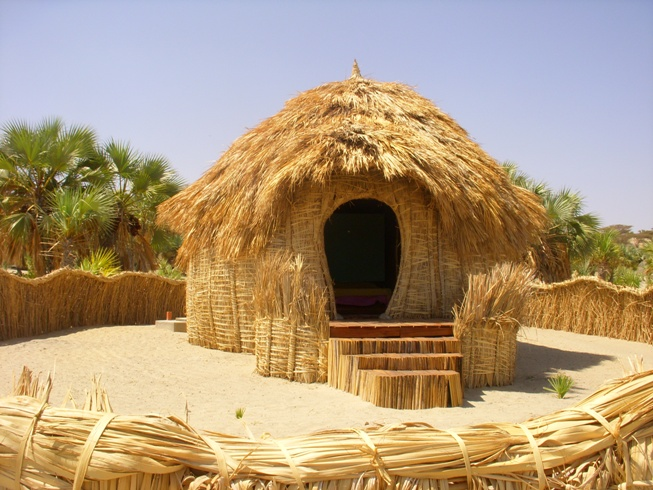
Hotel Room at Eliye Springs Resort on Lake Turkana

Around 1981, there was a hunting lodge on the side of the lake made up of a series of grass huts and very basic facilities. By 1982, this fell into disrepair and the owner left, but some staff members remained, hoping to collect unpaid wages. The huts provided refuge for intrepid travellers who enjoyed the clear, warm waters and sunsets. Food had to be bought in Lodwar, and the journey to Eliye Springs in 1982 took about 2 hours.

The Lodge has since been placed under new management and attracts a growing clientele of tourists to the non-humid white sand beach. A sand surface airstrip nearby supports small chartered aircraft.

== Early Human History and Cradle Of Mankind ==
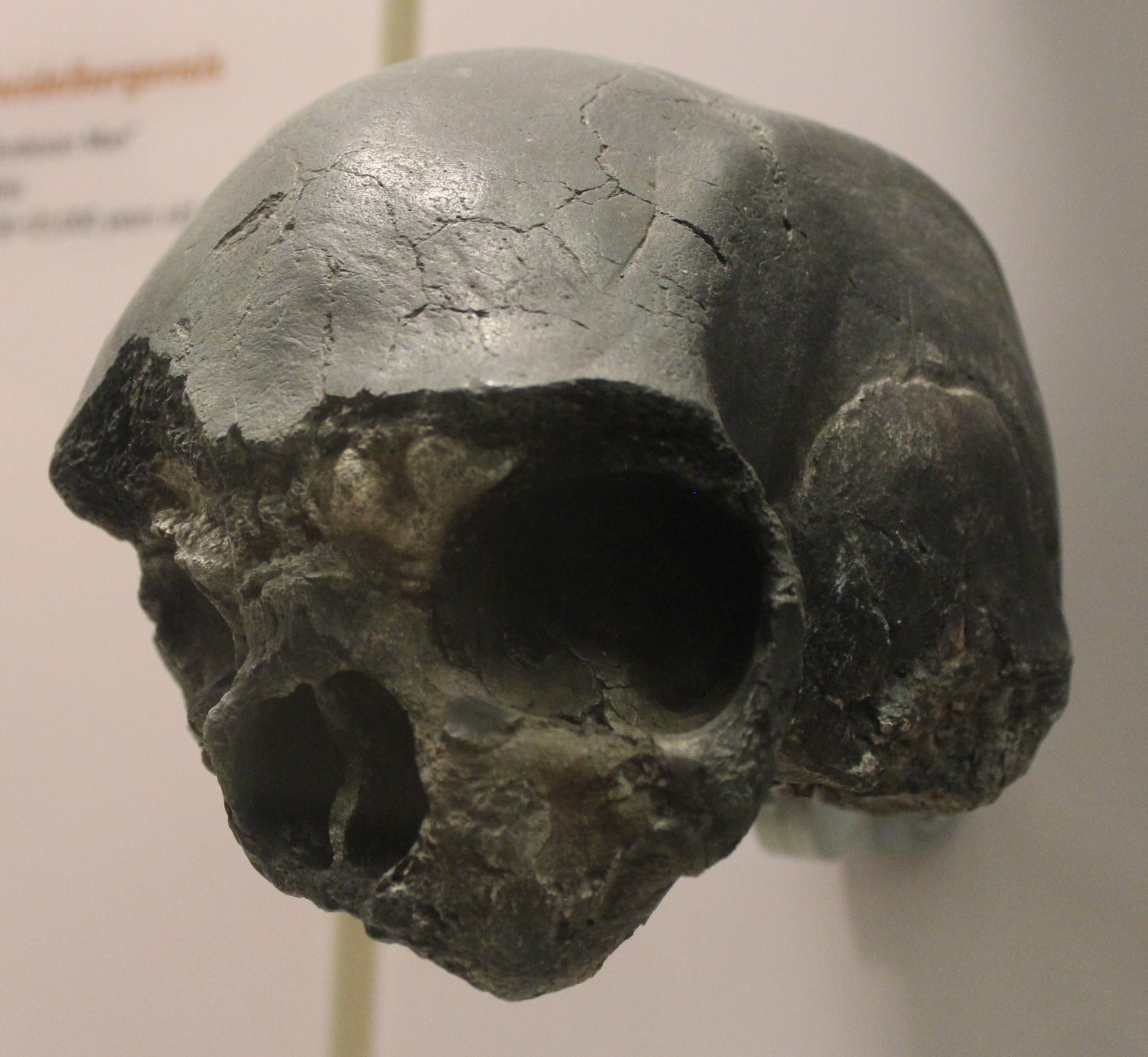
Replica of ES-11693, National Museum of Natural History

A skull of a very early human species called Homo heidelbergensis and dating between 200,000 and 300,000 years old with Exhibit Item Number "Eliye Springs ES11693" can be found at the Smithsonian Institution.

In a preliminary report (Bräuer & Leakey, 1986), the new fossil cranium KNM-ES-11693 from Eliye Springs at the western shore of Lake Turkana was presented as a further representative of archaic Homo sapiens: "The specimen comes from reworked deposits which exclude its being stratigraphically located. However, in spite of the dating problems, the well preserved and heavily mineralized fossil exhibits many morphological features by which it can be assigned to archaic Homo sapiens".

ES-11693 is compared to African early and late archaic Homo sapiens. Although the new hominid presents a unique mosaic of archaic and modern features, it appears to have a closer relationship with the late archaic H. sapiens grade, in which such hominids as Omo 2 and Laetoli H. 18 can also be grouped.

A phylogenetic analysis placed the Eliye Springs specimen close to Homo antecessor and a fossil from Rabat.
