= Keokuk Municipal Airport =

Airport in Iowa, United States

- IATA: EOK; ICAO: KEOK; FAA LID: EOK

Summary
- Airport type: Public
- Owner: City of Keokuk
- Serves: Keokuk, Iowa
- Elevation AMSL: 671 ft (205 m)
- Coordinates: 40°27′36″N 091°25′43″W

Map
- Location within Iowa Location within the United States

Runways
Direction	Length		Surface
Direction	ft	m	Surface
8/26	5,500	1,676	Concrete
14/32	3,576	1,090	Concrete

Statistics
- Aircraft operations (2015): 8,050
- Based aircraft (2017): 17
- Source: Federal Aviation Administration

Keokuk Municipal Airport (IATA: EOK, ICAO: KEOK, FAA LID: EOK) is five miles northwest of Keokuk, in Lee County, Iowa. The National Plan of Integrated Airport Systems for 2017–2021 categorized it as a general aviation facility.

Ozark Airlines DC-3s stopped at Keokuk from 1950 to 1954.

== Facilities ==
The airport covers 372 acres (151 ha) at an elevation of 671 feet (205 m). It has two concrete runways: 8/26 is 5,500 by 100 feet (1,676 x 30 m) and 14/32 is 3,576 by 100 feet (1,090 x 30 m).

In the year ending July 21, 2015 the airport had 8,050 aircraft operations, average 22 per day: 94% general aviation and 6% air taxi. In January 2017, 17 aircraft were based at the airport: 15 single-engine and 2 multi-engine.

== See also ==
- List of airports in Iowa
