= Toledo Municipal Airport (Iowa) =

Airport in Iowa, United States

- IATA: none; ICAO: none; FAA LID: 8C5

Summary
- Airport type: Public
- Owner: City of Toledo
- Serves: Toledo, Iowa
- Elevation AMSL: 960 ft / 293 m
- Coordinates: 41°59′18″N 092°32′53″W

Map
- Location of airport in Iowa 8C5 (the United States)

Runways
| Direction | Length | | Surface |
| Direction | ft | m | Surface |
|---|---|---|---|
| 17/35 | 1,850 | 564 | Turf |

Statistics (2008)
- Aircraft operations: 990
- Source: Federal Aviation Administration

Toledo Municipal Airport (FAA LID: 8C5) is a city-owned public-use airport located two nautical miles (3.7 km) east of the central business district of Toledo, a city in Tama County, Iowa, United States.

== Facilities and aircraft ==
Toledo Municipal Airport covers an area of 10 acres (4.0 ha) at an elevation of 960 feet (293 m) above mean sea level. It has one runway designated 17/35 with a turf surface measuring 1,850 by 100 feet (564 x 30 m). For the 12-month period ending July 30, 2008, the airport had 990 general aviation aircraft operations, an average of 82 per month.

== See also ==
- List of airports in Iowa
