= List of airports by IATA code: C =

The DST column shows the months in which Daylight Saving Time, a.k.a. Summer Time, begins and ends. A blank DST box usually indicates that the location stays on Standard Time all year, although in some cases the location stays on Summer Time all year. If a location is currently on DST, add one hour to the time in the Time column.

IATA	ICAO	Airport name	Location served	Time	DST
-CA-
CAA	MHGE	El Aguacate Airport	Catacamas, Honduras	UTC−06:00	
CAB	FNCA	Cabinda Airport	Cabinda, Angola	UTC+01:00	
CAC	SBCA	Cascavel Airport (Adalberto Mendes da Silva Airport)	Cascavel, Paraná, Brazil	UTC−03:00	
CAD	KCAD	Wexford County Airport	Cadillac, Michigan, United States	UTC−05:00	Mar–Nov
CAE	KCAE	Columbia Metropolitan Airport	Columbia, South Carolina, United States	UTC−05:00	Mar–Nov
CAF	SWCA	Carauari Airport	Carauari, Amazonas, Brazil	UTC−05:00	
CAG	LIEE	Cagliari Elmas Airport	Cagliari, Sardinia, Italy	UTC+01:00	Mar–Oct
CAH	VVCM	Cà Mau Airport	Cà Mau, Vietnam	UTC+07:00	
CAI	HECA	Cairo International Airport	Cairo, Egypt	UTC+02:00	
CAJ	SVCN	Canaima Airport	Canaima, Venezuela	UTC−04:00	
CAK	KCAK	Akron-Canton Airport	Akron / Canton, Ohio, United States	UTC−05:00	Mar–Nov
CAL	EGEC	Campbeltown Airport / RAF Machrihanish	Campbeltown, Scotland, United Kingdom	UTC±00:00	Mar–Oct
CAM	SLCA	Camiri Airport	Camiri, Bolivia	UTC−04:00	
CAN	ZGGG	Guangzhou Baiyun International Airport	Guangzhou, Guangdong, China	UTC+08:00	
CAO	KCAO	Clayton Municipal Airpark	Clayton, New Mexico, United States	UTC−07:00	Mar–Nov
CAP	MTCH	Hugo Chávez International Airport	Cap-Haïtien, Haiti	UTC−05:00	Mar–Nov
CAQ	SKCU	Juan H. White Airport	Caucasia, Colombia	UTC−05:00	
CAR	KCAR	Caribou Municipal Airport	Caribou, Maine, United States	UTC−05:00	Mar–Nov
CAS	GMMC	Anfa Airport	Casablanca, Morocco	UTC±00:00	Mar–Oct^{1}
CAT	LPCS	Cascais Municipal Aerodrome	Cascais, Portugal	UTC±00:00	Mar–Oct
CAU	SNRU	Caruaru Airport (Oscar Laranjeiras Airport)	Caruaru, Pernambuco, Brazil	UTC−03:00	
CAV	FNCZ	Cazombo Airport	Cazombo, Angola	UTC+01:00	
CAW	SBCP	Bartolomeu Lysandro Airport	Campos dos Goytacazes, Rio de Janeiro, Brazil	UTC−03:00	
CAX	EGNC	Carlisle Lake District Airport	Carlisle, England, United Kingdom	UTC±00:00	Mar–Oct
CAY	SOCA	Cayenne – Félix Eboué Airport	Cayenne, French Guiana	UTC−03:00	
CAZ	YCBA	Cobar Airport	Cobar, New South Wales, Australia	UTC+10:00	Oct–Apr
-CB-
CBB	SLCB	Jorge Wilstermann International Airport	Cochabamba, Bolivia	UTC−04:00	
CBC		Cherrabun Airport	Cherrabun, Western Australia, Australia	UTC+08:00	
CBD	VOCX	Car Nicobar Air Force Base	Car Nicobar, Andaman and Nicobar Islands, India	UTC+05:30	
CBE	KCBE	Greater Cumberland Regional Airport	Cumberland, Maryland, United States	UTC−05:00	Mar–Nov
CBF	KCBF	Council Bluffs Municipal Airport	Council Bluffs, Iowa, United States	UTC−06:00	Mar–Nov
CBG	EGSC	Cambridge Airport	Cambridge, England, United Kingdom	UTC±00:00	Mar–Oct
CBH	DAOR	Boudghene Ben Ali Lotfi Airport	Béchar, Algeria	UTC+01:00	
CBI		Cape Barren Island Airport	Cape Barren Island, Tasmania, Australia	UTC+10:00	Oct–Apr
CBJ	MDCR	Cabo Rojo Airport	Pedernales, Dominican Republic	UTC−04:00	
CBK	KCBK	Colby Municipal Airport (Shalz Field)	Colby, Kansas, United States	UTC−06:00	Mar–Nov
CBL	SVCB	Tomás de Heres Airport	Ciudad Bolívar, Venezuela	UTC−04:00	
CBM	KCBM	Columbus Air Force Base	Columbus, Mississippi, United States	UTC−06:00	Mar–Nov
CBN	WICD	Penggung Airport (Cakrabuwana Airport)	Cirebon, Indonesia	UTC+07:00	
CBO	RPMC	Awang Airport	Cotabato City, Philippines	UTC+08:00	
CBP	LPCO	Coimbra Airport	Coimbra, Portugal	UTC±00:00	Mar–Oct
CBQ	DNCA	Margaret Ekpo International Airport	Calabar, Nigeria	UTC+01:00	
CBR	YSCB	Canberra Airport	Canberra, Australian Capital Territory, Australia	UTC+10:00	Oct–Apr
CBS	SVON	Oro Negro Airport	Cabimas, Venezuela	UTC−04:00	
CBT	FNCT	Catumbela Airport	Catumbela, Angola	UTC+01:00	
CBU	EDCD	Cottbus-Drewitz Airport	Cottbus, Brandenburg, Germany	UTC+01:00	Mar–Oct
CBV	MGCB	Cobán Airport	Cobán, Guatemala	UTC−06:00	
CBW	SSKM	Campo Mourão Airport	Campo Mourão, Paraná, Brazil	UTC−03:00	
CBX	YCDO	Condobolin Airport	Condobolin, New South Wales, Australia	UTC+10:00	Oct–Apr
CBY		Canobie Airport	Canobie Station, Queensland, Australia	UTC+10:00	
CBZ		Binzhou Dagao General Airport	Binzhou, Shandong, China	UTC+08:00	
-CC-
CCA	SLCH	Chimore Airport	Chimoré, Cochabamba, Bolivia	UTC−04:00	
CCB	KCCB	Cable Airport	Upland, California, United States	UTC−08:00	Mar–Nov
CCC	MUCC	Jardines del Rey Airport	Cayo Coco, Cuba	UTC−05:00	Mar–Nov
CCF	LFMK	Carcassonne Airport	Carcassonne, Languedoc-Roussillon, France	UTC+01:00	Mar–Oct
CCG		Crane County Airport (FAA: E13)	Crane, Texas, United States	UTC−06:00	Mar–Nov
CCH	SCCC	Chile Chico Airfield	Chile Chico, Chile	UTC−04:00	Aug–May
CCI	SSCK	Concórdia Airport	Concórdia, Santa Catarina, Brazil	UTC−03:00	
CCJ	VOCL	Calicut International Airport	Kozhikode (Calicut), Kerala, India	UTC+05:30	
CCK	YPCC	Cocos (Keeling) Islands Airport	Cocos (Keeling) Islands, Australia	UTC+06:30	
CCL	YCCA	Chinchilla Airport	Chinchilla, Queensland, Australia	UTC+10:00	
CCM	SBCM	Diomício Freitas Airport	Criciúma, Santa Catarina, Brazil	UTC−03:00	
CCN	OACC	Chaghcharan Airport	Chaghcharan, Afghanistan	UTC+04:30	
CCO	SKCI	Carimagua Airport	Carimagua, Colombia	UTC−05:00	
CCP	SCIE	Carriel Sur International Airport	Concepción, Chile	UTC−04:00	Aug–May
CCR	KCCR	Buchanan Field Airport	Concord, California, United States	UTC−08:00	Mar–Nov
CCS	SVMI	Simón Bolívar International Airport	Caracas, Venezuela	UTC−04:00	
CCT		Colonia Catriel Airport	Catriel, Río Negro, Argentina	UTC−03:00	
CCU	VECC	Netaji Subhas Chandra Bose International Airport	Kolkata, West Bengal, India	UTC+05:30	
CCV	NVSF	Craig Cove Airport	Craig Cove, Ambrym Island, Malampa, Vanuatu	UTC+11:00	
CCW	YCWL	Cowell Airport	Cowell, South Australia, Australia	UTC+09:30	Oct–Apr
CCX	SWKC	Cáceres Airport	Cáceres, Mato Grosso, Brazil	UTC−03:00	
CCY	KCCY	Northeast Iowa Regional Airport	Charles City, Iowa, United States	UTC−06:00	Mar–Nov
CCZ	MYBC	Chub Cay International Airport	Chub Cay, Berry Islands, Bahamas	UTC−05:00	Mar–Nov
-CD-
CDA	YCOO	Cooinda Airport	Cooinda, Northern Territory, Australia	UTC+09:30	
CDB	PACD	Cold Bay Airport	Cold Bay, Alaska, United States	UTC−09:00	Mar–Nov
CDC	KCDC	Cedar City Regional Airport	Cedar City, Utah, United States	UTC−07:00	Mar–Nov
CDD		Cauquira Airport	Cauquira, Honduras	UTC−06:00	
CDE	ZBCD	Chengde Puning Airport	Chengde, Hebei, China	UTC+08:00	
CDG	LFPG	Charles de Gaulle Airport (Roissy Airport)	Paris, Île-de-France, France	UTC+01:00	Mar–Oct
CDH	KCDH	Harrell Field	Camden, Arkansas, United States	UTC−06:00	Mar–Nov
CDI	SNKI	Cachoeiro de Itapemirim Airport (Raimundo de Andrade Airport)	Cachoeiro de Itapemirim, Espírito Santo, Brazil	UTC−03:00	
CDJ	SBAA	Conceição do Araguaia Airport	Conceição do Araguaia, Pará, Brazil	UTC−03:00	
CDK	KCDK	George T. Lewis Airport	Cedar Key, Florida, United States	UTC−05:00	Mar–Nov
CDL		Candle 2 Airport (FAA: AK75)	Candle, Alaska, United States	UTC−09:00	Mar–Nov
CDN	KCDN	Woodward Field	Camden, South Carolina, United States	UTC−05:00	Mar–Nov
CDO	FACD	Cradock Airport	Cradock, South Africa	UTC+02:00	
CDP	VOCP	Kadapa Airport	Kadapa, Andhra Pradesh, India	UTC+05:30	
CDQ	YCRY	Croydon Airport	Croydon, Queensland, Australia	UTC+10:00	
CDR	KCDR	Chadron Municipal Airport	Chadron, Nebraska, United States	UTC−07:00	Mar–Nov
CDS	KCDS	Childress Municipal Airport	Childress, Texas, United States	UTC−06:00	Mar–Nov
CDT	LECS	Castellón–Costa Azahar Airport	Castellón de la Plana, Valencia, Spain	UTC+01:00	Mar–Oct
CDU	YSCN	Camden Airport	Camden, New South Wales, Australia	UTC+10:00	Oct–Apr
CDV	PACV	Merle K. (Mudhole) Smith Airport	Cordova, Alaska, United States	UTC−09:00	Mar–Nov
CDW	KCDW	Essex County Airport	Caldwell, New Jersey, United States	UTC−05:00	Mar–Nov
CDY	RPMU	Cagayan de Sulu Airport	Mapun, Philippines	UTC+08:00	
-CE-
CEA	KCEA	Cessna Aircraft Field	Wichita, Kansas, United States	UTC−06:00	Mar–Nov
CEB	RPVM	Mactan–Cebu International Airport	Lapu-Lapu, Philippines	UTC+08:00	
CEC	KCEC	Del Norte County Airport (Jack McNamara Field)	Crescent City, California, United States	UTC−08:00	Mar–Nov
CED	YCDU	Ceduna Airport	Ceduna, South Australia, Australia	UTC+09:30	Oct–Apr
CEE	ULWC	Cherepovets Airport	Cherepovets, Vologda Oblast, Russia	UTC+03:00	
CEF	KCEF	Westover Metropolitan Airport / Westover Air Reserve Base	Springfield, Massachusetts, United States	UTC−05:00	Mar–Nov
CEG	EGNR	Hawarden Airport (Chester Airport)	Chester, England, United Kingdom	UTC±00:00	Mar–Oct
CEH	FWCD	Chelinda Airport	Chelinda, Malawi	UTC+02:00	
CEI	VTCT	Chiang Rai International Airport (Mae Fah Luang Int'l)	Chiang Rai, Thailand	UTC+07:00	
CEK	USCC	Chelyabinsk Airport	Chelyabinsk, Chelyabinsk Oblast, Russia	UTC+05:00	
CEL	SSCN	Canela Airport	Canela, Rio Grande do Sul, Brazil	UTC−03:00	
CEM	PARL	Central Airport	Central, Alaska, United States	UTC−09:00	Mar–Nov
CEN	MMCN	Ciudad Obregón International Airport	Ciudad Obregón, Sonora, Mexico	UTC−07:00	
CEO	FNWK	Waco Kungo Airport	Waku-Kungo, Angola	UTC+01:00	
CEP	SLCP	Concepción Airport	Concepción, Bolivia	UTC−04:00	
CEQ	LFMD	Cannes – Mandelieu Airport	Cannes, Provence-Alpes-Côte d'Azur, France	UTC+01:00	Mar–Oct
CER	LFRC	Cherbourg – Maupertus Airport	Cherbourg-Octeville, Lower Normandy, France	UTC+01:00	Mar–Oct
CES	YCNK	Cessnock Airport	Cessnock, New South Wales, Australia	UTC+10:00	Oct–Apr
CET	LFOU	Cholet Le Pontreau Airport	Cholet, Pays de la Loire, France	UTC+01:00	Mar–Oct
CEU	KCEU	Oconee County Regional Airport	Clemson, South Carolina, United States	UTC−05:00	Mar–Nov
CEV	KCEV	Mettel Field	Connersville, Indiana, United States	UTC−05:00	Mar–Nov
CEW	KCEW	Bob Sikes Airport	Crestview, Florida, United States	UTC−06:00	Mar–Nov
CEX		Chena Hot Springs Airport (FAA: AK13)	Chena Hot Springs, Alaska, United States	UTC−09:00	Mar–Nov
CEY	KCEY	Murray-Calloway County Airport	Murray, Kentucky, United States	UTC−06:00	Mar–Nov
CEZ	KCEZ	Cortez Municipal Airport	Cortez, Colorado, United States	UTC−07:00	Mar–Nov
-CF-
CFB	SBCB	Cabo Frio International Airport	Cabo Frio, Rio de Janeiro, Brazil	UTC−03:00	
CFC	SBCD	Caçador Airport	Caçador, Santa Catarina, Brazil	UTC−03:00	
CFD	KCFD	Coulter Field	Bryan, Texas, United States	UTC−06:00	Mar–Nov
CFE	LFLC	Clermont-Ferrand Auvergne Airport	Clermont-Ferrand, Auvergne, France	UTC+01:00	Mar–Oct
CFF	FNCF	Cafunfo Airport	Cafunfo, Angola	UTC+01:00	
CFG	MUCF	Jaime González Airport	Cienfuegos, Cuba	UTC−05:00	Mar–Nov
CFH		Clifton Hills Airport	Clifton Hills, South Australia, Australia	UTC+09:30	Oct–Apr
CFI	YCFD	Camfield Airport	Camfield Station, Northern Territory, Australia	UTC+09:30	
CFK	DAOI	Chlef International Airport	Chlef, Algeria	UTC+01:00	
CFM		Conklin (Leismer) Airport	Wood Buffalo, Alberta, Canada	UTC−07:00	
CFN	EIDL	Donegal Airport	County Donegal, Ireland	UTC±00:00	Mar–Oct
CFO		Confresa Airport	Confresa, Mato Grosso, Brazil	UTC−04:00	
CFP		Carpentaria Downs Airport	Carpentaria Downs, Queensland, Australia	UTC+10:00	
CFQ		Creston Aerodrome (TC: CAJ3)	Creston, British Columbia, Canada	UTC−07:00	
CFR	LFRK	Caen – Carpiquet Airport	Caen, Lower Normandy, France	UTC+01:00	Mar–Oct
CFS	YCFS	Coffs Harbour Airport	Coffs Harbour, New South Wales, Australia	UTC+10:00	Oct–Apr
CFT	KCFT	Greenlee County Airport	Clifton / Morenci, Arizona, United States	UTC−07:00	
CFU	LGKR	Corfu International Airport (Ioannis Kapodistrias Int'l Airport)	Corfu, Greece	UTC+02:00	Mar–Oct
CFV	KCFV	Coffeyville Municipal Airport	Coffeyville, Kansas, United States	UTC−06:00	Mar–Nov
-CG-
CGA		Craig Seaplane Base	Craig, Alaska, United States	UTC−09:00	Mar–Nov
CGB	SBCY	Marechal Rondon International Airport	Cuiabá, Mato Grosso, Brazil	UTC−04:00	
CGC	AYCG	Cape Gloucester Airport	Cape Gloucester, Papua New Guinea	UTC+10:00	
CGD	ZGCD	Changde Taohuayuan Airport	Changde, Hunan, China	UTC+08:00	
CGE	KCGE	Cambridge–Dorchester Airport	Cambridge, Maryland, United States	UTC−05:00	Mar–Nov
CGF	KCGF	Cuyahoga County Airport	Cleveland, Ohio, United States	UTC−05:00	Mar–Nov
CGG		Casiguran Airport	Casiguran, Philippines	UTC+08:00	
CGH	SBSP	São Paulo/Congonhas–Deputado Freitas Nobre Airport	São Paulo, São Paulo, Brazil	UTC−03:00	
CGI	KCGI	Cape Girardeau Regional Airport	Cape Girardeau, Missouri, United States	UTC−06:00	Mar–Nov
CGJ		Kasompe Airport	Chingola, Zambia	UTC+02:00	
CGK	WIII	Soekarno–Hatta International Airport	Jakarta, Indonesia	UTC+07:00	
CGM	RPMH	Camiguin Airport	Mambajao, Philippines	UTC+08:00	
CGN	EDDK	Cologne Bonn Airport	Cologne / Bonn, North Rhine-Westphalia, Germany	UTC+01:00	Mar–Oct
CGO	ZHCC	Zhengzhou Xinzheng International Airport	Zhengzhou, Henan, China	UTC+08:00	
CGP	VGEG	Shah Amanat International Airport	Chittagong, Bangladesh	UTC+06:00	
CGQ	ZYCC	Changchun Longjia International Airport	Changchun, Jilin, China	UTC+08:00	
CGR	SBCG	Campo Grande International Airport	Campo Grande, Mato Grosso do Sul, Brazil	UTC−04:00	
CGS	KCGS	College Park Airport	College Park, Maryland, United States	UTC−05:00	Mar–Nov
CGT		Chinguetti Airport	Chinguetti, Mauritania	UTC±00:00	
CGV	YCAG	Caiguna Airport	Caiguna, Western Australia, Australia	UTC+08:00	
CGX		Chunga Airstrip	Chunga, Zambia	UTC+02:00	
CGY	RPMY	Laguindingan Airport	Cagayan de Oro, Philippines	UTC+08:00	
CGZ	KCGZ	Casa Grande Municipal Airport	Casa Grande, Arizona, United States	UTC−07:00	
-CH-
CHA	KCHA	Chattanooga Metropolitan Airport (Lovell Field)	Chattanooga, Tennessee, United States	UTC−05:00	Mar–Nov
CHB	OPCL	Chilas Airport	Chilas, Pakistan	UTC+05:00	
CHC	NZCH	Christchurch International Airport	Christchurch, New Zealand	UTC+12:00	Sep–Apr
CHF	RKPE	Jinhae Airport	Jinhae, South Korea	UTC+09:00	
CHG	ZYCY	Chaoyang Airport	Chaoyang, Liaoning, China	UTC+08:00	
CHH	SPPY	Chachapoyas Airport	Chachapoyas, Peru	UTC−05:00	
CHI		metropolitan area^{2}	Chicago, Illinois, United States	UTC−06:00	Mar–Nov
CHJ	FVCH	Chipinge Airport	Chipinge, Zimbabwe	UTC+02:00	
CHK	KCHK	Chickasha Municipal Airport	Chickasha, Oklahoma, United States	UTC−06:00	Mar–Nov
CHL	KLLJ	Challis Airport (FAA: LLJ)	Challis, Idaho, United States	UTC−07:00	Mar–Nov
CHM	SPEO	Tnte. FAP Jaime Montreuil Morales Airport	Chimbote, Peru	UTC−05:00	
CHN	RKJU	Jeonju Airport	Jeonju, South Korea	UTC+09:00	
CHO	KCHO	Charlottesville–Albemarle Airport	Charlottesville, Virginia, United States	UTC−05:00	Mar–Nov
CHP		Circle Hot Springs Airport	Circle Hot Springs, Alaska, United States	UTC−09:00	Mar–Nov
CHQ	LGSA	Chania International Airport ("Ioannis Daskalogiannis")	Chania, Greece	UTC+02:00	Mar–Oct
CHR	LFLX	Châteauroux-Centre "Marcel Dassault" Airport	Châteauroux, Centre-Val de Loire, France	UTC+01:00	Mar–Oct
CHS	KCHS	Charleston International Airport / Charleston Air Force Base	Charleston, South Carolina, United States	UTC−05:00	Mar–Nov
CHT	NZCI	Chatham Islands / Tuuta Airport	Chatham Islands, New Zealand	UTC+12:45	Sep–Apr
CHU	PACH	Chuathbaluk Airport (FAA: 9A3)	Chuathbaluk, Alaska, United States	UTC−09:00	Mar–Nov
CHV	LPCH	Chaves Airport	Chaves, Portugal	UTC±00:00	Mar–Oct
CHX	MPCH	Changuinola "Capitán Manuel Niño" International Airport	Changuinola, Panama	UTC−05:00	
CHY	AGGC	Choiseul Bay Airport	Choiseul Bay, Taro Island, Solomon Islands	UTC+11:00	
CHZ		Chiloquin State Airport (FAA: 2S7)	Chiloquin, Oregon, United States	UTC−08:00	Mar–Nov
-CI-
CIA	LIRA	Ciampino–G. B. Pastine International Airport	Rome, Lazio, Italy	UTC+01:00	Mar–Oct
CIC	KCIC	Chico Municipal Airport	Chico, California, United States	UTC−08:00	Mar–Nov
CID	KCID	The Eastern Iowa Airport	Cedar Rapids, Iowa, United States	UTC−06:00	Mar–Nov
CIE	YCOI	Collie Airport	Collie, Western Australia, Australia	UTC+08:00	
CIF	ZBCF	Chifeng Yulong Airport	Chifeng, Inner Mongolia, China	UTC+08:00	
CIG	KCAG	Craig–Moffat Airport (FAA: CAG)	Craig, Colorado, United States	UTC−07:00	Mar–Nov
CIH	ZBCZ	Changzhi Wangcun Airport	Changzhi, Shanxi, China	UTC+08:00	
CII	LTBD	Aydın Airport (Çıldır Airport)	Aydın, Turkey	UTC+03:00	
CIJ	SLCO	Captain Aníbal Arab Airport	Cobija, Bolivia	UTC−04:00	
CIK	PACI	Chalkyitsik Airport	Chalkyitsik, Alaska, United States	UTC−09:00	Mar–Nov
CIL		Council Airport (FAA: K29)	Council, Alaska, United States	UTC−09:00	Mar–Nov
CIM	SKCM	Cimitarra Airport	Cimitarra, Colombia	UTC−05:00	
CIN	KCIN	Arthur N. Neu Airport	Carroll, Iowa, United States	UTC−06:00	Mar–Nov
CIO	SGCO	Teniente Coronel Carmelo Peralta Airport	Concepción, Paraguay	UTC−04:00	Oct–Mar
CIP	FLCP	Chipata Airport	Chipata, Zambia	UTC+02:00	
CIQ		Chiquimula Airport	Chiquimula, Guatemala	UTC−06:00	
CIR	KCIR	Cairo Regional Airport	Cairo, Illinois, United States	UTC−06:00	Mar–Nov
CIS	PCIS	Canton Island Airport	Canton Island, Kiribati	UTC+13:00	
CIT	UAII	Shymkent International Airport	Shymkent, Kazakhstan	UTC+06:00	
CIU	KCIU	Chippewa County International Airport	Sault Ste Marie, Michigan, United States	UTC−05:00	Mar–Nov
CIW	TVSC	Canouan Airport	Canouan, Saint Vincent and the Grenadines	UTC−04:00	
CIX	SPHI	FAP Captain José Abelardo Quiñones González International Airport	Chiclayo, Peru	UTC−05:00	
CIY	LICB	Comiso Airport	Comiso, Sicily, Italy	UTC+01:00	Mar–Oct
CIZ	SWKO	Coari Airport	Coari, Amazonas, Brazil	UTC−04:00	
-CJ-
CJA	SPJR	Mayor General FAP Armando Revoredo Iglesias Airport	Cajamarca, Peru	UTC−05:00	
CJB	VOCB	Coimbatore International Airport	Coimbatore, Tamil Nadu, India	UTC+05:30	
CJC	SCCF	El Loa Airport	Calama, Chile	UTC−04:00	Aug–May
CJD		Candilejas Airport	Candilejas, Colombia	UTC−05:00	
CJF	YCWA	Coondewanna Airport	Coondewanna, Western Australia, Australia	UTC+08:00	
CJH		Chilko Lake (Tsylos Park Lodge) Aerodrome (TC: CAG3)	Chilko Lake, British Columbia, Canada	UTC−08:00	Mar–Nov
CJJ	RKTU	Cheongju International Airport	Cheongju, South Korea	UTC+09:00	
CJL	OPCH	Chitral Airport	Chitral, Pakistan	UTC+05:00	
CJM	VTSE	Chumphon Airport	Chumphon, Thailand	UTC+07:00	
CJN	WI1A	Cijulang Nusawiru Airport	Cijulang, Indonesia		
CJR	KCJR	Culpeper Regional Airport	Culpeper, Virginia, United States	UTC-5:00	
CJS	MMCS	Abraham González International Airport	Ciudad Juárez, Chihuahua, Mexico	UTC−07:00	Mar–Nov
CJT	MMCO	Copalar Airport	Comitán, Chiapas, Mexico	UTC−06:00	Apr–Oct
CJU	RKPC	Jeju International Airport	Jeju, South Korea	UTC+09:00	
-CK-
CKA	KCKA	Kegelman Air Force Auxiliary Field	Cherokee, Oklahoma, United States	UTC−06:00	Mar–Nov
CKB	KCKB	North Central West Virginia Airport	Clarksburg, West Virginia, United States	UTC−05:00	Mar–Nov
CKC	UKKE	Cherkasy International Airport	Cherkasy, Ukraine	UTC+02:00	Mar–Oct
CKD	PACJ	Crooked Creek Airport (FAA: CJX)	Crooked Creek, Alaska, United States	UTC−09:00	Mar–Nov
CKE		Lampson Field (FAA: 1O2)	Lakeport, California, United States	UTC−08:00	Mar–Nov
CKG	ZUCK	Chongqing Jiangbei International Airport	Chongqing, China	UTC+08:00	
CKH	UESO	Chokurdakh Airport	Chokurdakh, Yakutia, Russia	UTC+11:00	
CKI	YCKI	Croker Island Airport	Croker Island, Northern Territory, Australia	UTC+09:30	
CKK	KCVK	Sharp County Regional Airport (FAA: CVK)	Ash Flat, Arkansas, United States	UTC−06:00	Mar–Nov
CKL	UUMU	Chkalovsky Airport	Shchyolkovo (Moscow Oblast), Russia	UTC+03:00	
CKM	KCKM	Fletcher Field	Clarksdale, Mississippi, United States	UTC−06:00	Mar–Nov
CKN	KCKN	Crookston Municipal Airport (Kirkwood Field)	Crookston, Minnesota, United States	UTC−06:00	Mar–Nov
CKO	SSCP	Cornélio Procópio Airport	Cornélio Procópio, Paraná, Brazil	UTC−03:00	
CKR		Crane Island Airstrip	Crane Island, Washington, United States	UTC−08:00	Mar–Nov
CKS	SBCJ	Carajás Airport	Parauapebas, Pará, Brazil	UTC−03:00	
CKT	OIMC	Sarakhs Airport	Sarakhs, Iran	UTC+03:30	Mar–Sep
CKU		Cordova Municipal Airport	Cordova, Alaska, United States	UTC−09:00	Mar–Nov
CKV	KCKV	Clarksville–Montgomery County Regional Airport (Outlaw Field)	Clarksville, Tennessee, United States	UTC−06:00	Mar–Nov
CKW	YCHK	Graeme Rowley Aerodrome	Christmas Creek mine, Western Australia, Australia	UTC+08:00	
CKX		Chicken Airport	Chicken, Alaska, United States	UTC−09:00	Mar–Nov
CKY	GUCY	Conakry International Airport (Gbessia Int'l Airport)	Conakry, Guinea	UTC±00:00	
CKZ	LTBH	Çanakkale Airport	Çanakkale, Turkey	UTC+03:00	
-CL-
CLA	VGCM	Comilla Airport	Comilla, Bangladesh	UTC+06:00	
CLD	KCRQ	McClellan–Palomar Airport (FAA: CRQ)	Carlsbad, California, United States	UTC−08:00	Mar–Nov
CLE	KCLE	Cleveland Hopkins International Airport	Cleveland, Ohio, United States	UTC−05:00	Mar–Nov
CLG		New Coalinga Municipal Airport (FAA: C80)	Coalinga, California, United States	UTC−08:00	Mar–Nov
CLH	YCAH	Coolah Airport	Coolah, New South Wales, Australia	UTC+10:00	Oct–Apr
CLI	KCLI	Clintonville Municipal Airport	Clintonville, Wisconsin, United States	UTC−06:00	Mar–Nov
CLJ	LRCL	Cluj-Napoca International Airport	Cluj-Napoca, Romania	UTC+02:00	Mar–Oct
CLK	KCLK	Clinton Regional Airport	Clinton, Oklahoma, United States	UTC−06:00	Mar–Nov
CLL	KCLL	Easterwood Airport (Easterwood Field)	College Station, Texas, United States	UTC−06:00	Mar–Nov
CLM	KCLM	William R. Fairchild International Airport	Port Angeles, Washington, United States	UTC−08:00	Mar–Nov
CLN	SBCI	Carolina Airport	Carolina, Maranhão, Brazil	UTC−03:00	
CLO	SKCL	Alfonso Bonilla Aragón International Airport	Cali, Colombia	UTC−05:00	
CLP	PFCL	Clarks Point Airport	Clark's Point, Alaska, United States	UTC−09:00	Mar–Nov
CLQ	MMIA	Licenciado Miguel de la Madrid Airport	Colima City, Colima, Mexico	UTC−06:00	Apr–Oct
CLR	KCLR	Cliff Hatfield Memorial Airport	Calipatria, California, United States	UTC−08:00	Mar–Nov
CLS	KCLS	Chehalis-Centralia Airport	Chehalis, Washington, United States	UTC−08:00	Mar–Nov
CLT	KCLT	Charlotte Douglas International Airport	Charlotte, North Carolina, United States	UTC−05:00	Mar–Nov
CLU	KBAK	Columbus Municipal Airport (FAA: BAK)	Columbus, Indiana, United States	UTC−05:00	Mar–Nov
CLV	SWKN	Caldas Novas Airport	Caldas Novas, Goiás, Brazil	UTC−03:00	
CLW	KCLW	Clearwater Air Park	Clearwater, Florida, United States	UTC−05:00	Mar–Nov
CLX	SATC	Clorinda Airport	Clorinda, Formosa, Argentina	UTC−03:00	
CLY	LFKC	Calvi – Sainte-Catherine Airport	Calvi, Corsica, France	UTC+01:00	Mar–Oct
CLZ	SVCL	Calabozo Airport	Calabozo, Venezuela	UTC−04:00	
-CM-
CMA	YCMU	Cunnamulla Airport	Cunnamulla, Queensland, Australia	UTC+10:00	
CMB	VCBI	Bandaranaike International Airport	Colombo, Sri Lanka	UTC+05:30	
CMC	SNWC	Camocim Airport	Camocim, Ceará, Brazil	UTC−03:00	
CMD	YCTM	Cootamundra Airport	Cootamundra, New South Wales, Australia	UTC+10:00	Oct–Apr
CME	MMCE	Ciudad del Carmen International Airport	Ciudad del Carmen, Campeche, Mexico	UTC−06:00	Apr–Oct
CMF	LFLB	Chambéry-Savoie Airport	Chambéry, Rhône-Alpes, France	UTC+01:00	Mar–Oct
CMG	SBCR	Corumbá International Airport	Corumbá, Mato Grosso do Sul, Brazil	UTC−04:00	
CMH	KCMH	John Glenn Columbus International Airport	Columbus, Ohio, United States	UTC−05:00	Mar–Nov
CMI	KCMI	University of Illinois Willard Airport	Champaign, Illinois, United States	UTC−06:00	Mar–Nov
CMJ	RCCM	Qimei Airport	Qimei, Taiwan	UTC+08:00	
CMK	FWCM	Club Makokola Airport	Club Makokola, Malawi	UTC+02:00	
CML	YCMW	Camooweal Airport	Camooweal, Queensland, Australia	UTC+10:00	
CMM	MGCR	Carmelita Airport	Carmelita, Guatemala	UTC−06:00	
CMN	GMMN	Mohammed V International Airport	Casablanca, Morocco	UTC±00:00	Mar–Oct^{1}
CMO	HCMO	Obbia Airport	Obbia, Somalia	UTC+03:00	
CMP	SNKE	Santana do Araguaia Airport	Santana do Araguaia, Pará, Brazil	UTC−03:00	
CMQ	YCMT	Clermont Airport	Clermont, Queensland, Australia	UTC+10:00	
CMR	LFGA	Colmar – Houssen Airport	Colmar, Alsace, France	UTC+01:00	Mar–Oct
CMS	HCMS	Iskushuban Airport	Iskushuban (Scusciuban), Somalia	UTC+03:00	
CMT		Cameta Airport	Cametá, Pará, Brazil	UTC−03:00	
CMU	AYCH	Chimbu Airport	Kundiawa, Papua New Guinea	UTC+10:00	
CMV	NZCX	Coromandel Aerodrome	Coromandel, New Zealand	UTC+12:00	Sep–Apr
CMW	MUCM	Ignacio Agramonte International Airport	Camagüey, Cuba	UTC−05:00	Mar–Nov
CMX	KCMX	Houghton County Memorial Airport	Hancock, Michigan, United States	UTC−05:00	Mar–Nov
CMY	KCMY	Sparta/Fort McCoy Airport	Sparta, Wisconsin, United States	UTC−06:00	Mar–Nov
CMZ		Caia Airport	Caia, Mozambique	UTC+02:00	
-CN-
CNA	MMCA	Cananea National Airport	Cananea, Sonora, Mexico	UTC−07:00	
CNB	YCNM	Coonamble Airport	Coonamble, New South Wales, Australia	UTC+10:00	Oct–Apr
CNC	YCCT	Coconut Island Airport	Coconut (Poruma) Island, Queensland, Australia	UTC+10:00	
CND	LRCK	Mihail Kogălniceanu International Airport	Constanța, Romania	UTC+02:00	Mar–Oct
CNE		Fremont County Airport (FAA: 1V6)	Cañon City, Colorado, United States	UTC−07:00	Mar–Nov
CNF	SBCF	Tancredo Neves International Airport (Confins Int'l Airport)	Belo Horizonte, Minas Gerais, Brazil	UTC−03:00	
CNG	LFBG	Cognac – Châteaubernard Air Base	Cognac, Poitou-Charentes, France	UTC+01:00	Mar–Oct
CNH	KCNH	Claremont Municipal Airport	Claremont, New Hampshire, United States	UTC−05:00	Mar–Nov
CNI	ZYCH	Changhai Airport	Changhai, Liaoning, China	UTC+08:00	
CNJ	YCCY	Cloncurry Airport	Cloncurry, Queensland, Australia	UTC+10:00	
CNK	KCNK	Blosser Municipal Airport	Concordia, Kansas, United States	UTC−06:00	Mar–Nov
CNL	EKSN	Sindal Airport	Sindal, Denmark	UTC+01:00	Mar–Oct
CNM	KCNM	Cavern City Air Terminal	Carlsbad, New Mexico, United States	UTC−07:00	Mar–Nov
CNN	VOKN	Kannur International Airport	Kannur, (Cannanore) Kerala, India	UTC+05:30	
CNO	KCNO	Chino Airport	Chino, California, United States	UTC−08:00	Mar–Nov
CNP	BGCO	Nerlerit Inaat Airport (Constable Pynt Airport)	Ittoqqortoormiit, Greenland	UTC−01:00	Mar–Oct
CNQ	SARC	Doctor Fernando Piragine Niveyro International Airport	Corrientes, Corrientes, Argentina	UTC−03:00	
CNR	SCRA	Chañaral Airport	Chañaral, Chile	UTC−04:00	Aug–May
CNS	YBCS	Cairns Airport	Cairns, Queensland, Australia	UTC+10:00	
CNT		Charata Airport	Charata, Chaco, Argentina	UTC−03:00	
CNU	KCNU	Chanute Martin Johnson Airport	Chanute, Kansas, United States	UTC−06:00	Mar–Nov
CNV	SNED	Canavieiras Airport	Canavieiras, Bahia, Brazil	UTC−03:00	
CNW	KCNW	TSTC Waco Airport	Waco, Texas, United States	UTC−06:00	Mar–Nov
CNX	VTCC	Chiang Mai International Airport	Chiang Mai, Thailand	UTC+07:00	
CNY	KCNY	Canyonlands Field	Moab, Utah, United States	UTC−07:00	Mar–Nov
CNZ		Cangamba Airport	Cangamba, Angola	UTC+01:00	
-CO-
COA		Columbia Airport (FAA: O22)	Columbia, California, United States	UTC−08:00	Mar–Nov
COB		Coolibah Airport	Coolibah Station, Northern Territory, Australia	UTC+09:30	
COC	SAAC	Comodoro Pierrestegui Airport	Concordia, Entre Ríos, Argentina	UTC−03:00	
COD	KCOD	Yellowstone Regional Airport	Cody, Wyoming, United States	UTC−07:00	Mar–Nov
COE	KCOE	Coeur d'Alene Airport	Coeur d'Alene, Idaho, United States	UTC−08:00	Mar–Nov
COF	KCOF	Patrick Space Force Base	Cocoa Beach, Florida, United States	UTC−05:00	Mar–Nov
COG	SKCD	Mandinga Airport	Condoto, Colombia	UTC−05:00	
COH	VECO	Cooch Behar Airport	Cooch Behar, West Bengal, India	UTC+05:30	
COI	KCOI	Merritt Island Airport	Merritt Island, Florida, United States	UTC−05:00	Mar–Nov
COJ	YCBB	Coonabarabran Airport	Coonabarabran, New South Wales, Australia	UTC+10:00	Oct–Apr
COK	VOCI	Cochin International Airport (Nedumbassery Airport)	Kochi (Cochin), Kerala, India	UTC+05:30	
COL		Coll Airport	Coll, Scotland, United Kingdom	UTC±00:00	Mar–Oct
COM	KCOM	Coleman Municipal Airport	Coleman, Texas, United States	UTC−06:00	Mar–Nov
CON	KCON	Concord Municipal Airport	Concord, New Hampshire, United States	UTC−05:00	Mar–Nov
COO	DBBB	Cadjehoun Airport	Cotonou, Benin	UTC+01:00	
COP		Cooperstown-Westville Airport (FAA: K23)	Cooperstown, New York, United States	UTC−05:00	Mar–Nov
COQ	ZMCD	Choibalsan Airport	Choibalsan, Mongolia	UTC+08:00	
COR	SACO	Ingeniero Aeronáutico Ambrosio L.V. Taravella International Airport (Pajas Blancas)	Córdoba, Córdoba, Argentina	UTC−03:00	
COS	KCOS	Colorado Springs Airport	Colorado Springs, Colorado, United States	UTC−07:00	Mar–Nov
COT	KCOT	Cotulla–La Salle County Airport	Cotulla, Texas, United States	UTC−06:00	Mar–Nov
COU	KCOU	Columbia Regional Airport	Columbia, Missouri, United States	UTC−06:00	Mar–Nov
COV	LTDB	Çukurova International Airport	Adana, Turkey	UTC+03:00	
COW	SCQB	Coquimbo Airport	Coquimbo, Chile	UTC−04:00	Aug–May
COY	YCWY	Coolawanyah Station Airport	Coolawanyah Station, Western Australia, Australia	UTC+08:00	
COZ	MDCZ	Constanza Airport	Constanza, Dominican Republic	UTC−04:00	
-CP-
CPA	GLCP	Cape Palmas Airport	Harper, Liberia	UTC±00:00	
CPB	SKCA	Capurganá Airport	Capurganá, Colombia	UTC−05:00	
CPC	SAZY	Aviador Carlos Campos Airport	San Martín de los Andes, Neuquén, Argentina	UTC−03:00	
CPD	YCBP	Coober Pedy Airport	Coober Pedy, South Australia, Australia	UTC+09:30	Oct–Apr
CPE	MMCP	Ing. Alberto Acuña Ongay International Airport	Campeche, Campeche, Mexico	UTC−06:00	Apr–Oct
CPF	WARC	Ngloram Airport	Cepu, Indonesia	UTC+07:00	
CPG		Carmen de Patagones Airport	Carmen de Patagones, Buenos Aires, Argentina	UTC−03:00	
CPH	EKCH	Copenhagen Airport, Kastrup	Copenhagen, Denmark	UTC+01:00	Mar–Oct
CPI		Cape Orford Airport	Cape Orford, Papua New Guinea	UTC+10:00	
CPL	SKHA	General Navas Pardo Airport	Chaparral, Colombia	UTC−05:00	
CPM	KCPM	Compton/Woodley Airport	Compton, California, United States	UTC−08:00	Mar–Nov
CPN		Cape Rodney Airport	Cape Rodney, Papua New Guinea	UTC+10:00	
CPO	SCAT	Desierto de Atacama Airport	Copiapó, Chile	UTC−04:00	Aug–May
CPP	SCKP	Coposa Airport	Pica, Chile		
CPR	KCPR	Casper–Natrona County International Airport	Casper, Wyoming, United States	UTC−07:00	Mar–Nov
CPS	KCPS	St. Louis Downtown Airport	Cahokia (near St. Louis/MO), Illinois, United States	UTC−06:00	Mar–Nov
CPT	FACT	Cape Town International Airport	Cape Town, South Africa	UTC+02:00	
CPU		Cururupu Airport	Cururupu, Maranhão, Brazil	UTC−03:00	
CPV	SBKG	Campina Grande Airport (Presidente João Suassuna Airport)	Campina Grande, Paraíba, Brazil	UTC−03:00	
CPX	TJCP	Benjamín Rivera Noriega Airport	Culebra, Puerto Rico, United States	UTC−04:00	
-CQ-
CQA		Canarana Airport	Canarana, Mato Grosso, Brazil	UTC−04:00	
CQD	OIFS	Shahrekord Airport	Shahrekord, Iran	UTC+03:30	Mar–Sep
CQF	LFAC	Calais–Dunkerque Airport	Calais / Dunkirk, Nord-Pas-de-Calais, France	UTC+01:00	Mar–Oct
CQM	LERL	Ciudad Real Central Airport	Ciudad Real, Castilla-La Mancha, Spain	UTC+01:00	Mar–Oct
CQP		Cape Flattery Airport	Cape Flattery, Queensland, Australia	UTC+10:00	
CQS	SWCQ	Costa Marques Airport	Costa Marques, Rondônia, Brazil	UTC−04:00	
CQT		Caquetania Airport	Caquetania, Colombia	UTC−05:00	
CQW		Wulong Xiannüshan Airport	Wulong, Chongqing, China	UTC+08:00	
-CR-
CRA	LRCV	Craiova International Airport	Craiova, Romania	UTC+02:00	Mar–Oct
CRB	YCBR	Collarenebri Airport	Collarenebri, New South Wales, Australia	UTC+10:00	Oct–Apr
CRC	SKGO	Santa Ana Airport	Cartago, Colombia	UTC−05:00	
CRD	SAVC	General Enrique Mosconi International Airport	Comodoro Rivadavia, Chubut, Argentina	UTC−03:00	
CRE	KCRE	Grand Strand Airport	North Myrtle Beach, South Carolina, United States	UTC−05:00	Mar–Nov
CRF	FEFC	Carnot Airport	Carnot, Central African Republic	UTC+01:00	
CRG	KCRG	Jacksonville Executive at Craig Airport	Jacksonville, Florida, United States	UTC−05:00	Mar–Nov
CRH		Cherrabah Airport	Cherrabah, Queensland, Australia	UTC+10:00	
CRI	MYCI	Colonel Hill Airport (Crooked Island Airport)	Colonel Hill, Crooked Island, Bahamas	UTC−05:00	Mar–Nov
CRJ		Coorabie Airport	Coorabie, South Australia, Australia	UTC+09:30	Oct–Apr
CRK	RPLC	Clark International Airport	Clark Special Economic Zone, Philippines	UTC+08:00	
CRL	EBCI	Brussels South Charleroi Airport	Charleroi, Belgium	UTC+01:00	Mar–Oct
CRM	RPVF	Catarman National Airport	Catarman, Philippines	UTC+08:00	
CRO	KCRO	Corcoran Airport	Corcoran, California, United States	UTC−08:00	Mar–Nov
CRP	KCRP	Corpus Christi International Airport	Corpus Christi, Texas, United States	UTC−06:00	Mar–Nov
CRQ	SBCV	Caravelas Airport	Caravelas, Bahia, Brazil	UTC−03:00	
CRR	SANW	Ceres Airport	Ceres, Santa Fe, Argentina	UTC−03:00	
CRS	KCRS	C. David Campbell Field (Corsicana Municipal Airport)	Corsicana, Texas, United States	UTC−06:00	Mar–Nov
CRT	KCRT	Z. M. Jack Stell Field	Crossett, Arkansas, United States	UTC−06:00	Mar–Nov
CRU	TGPZ	Lauriston Airport (Carriacou Island Airport)	Carriacou, Grenada	UTC−04:00	
CRV	LIBC	Crotone Airport (Sant'Anna Airport)	Crotone, Calabria, Italy	UTC+01:00	Mar–Oct
CRW	KCRW	Yeager Airport	Charleston, West Virginia, United States	UTC−05:00	Mar–Nov
CRX	KCRX	Roscoe Turner Airport	Corinth, Mississippi, United States	UTC−06:00	Mar–Nov
CRY		Carlton Hill Airport	Carlton Hill Station, Western Australia, Australia	UTC+08:00	
CRZ	UTAV	Turkmenabat Airport	Türkmenabat, Turkmenistan	UTC+05:00	
-CS-
CSA		Colonsay Airport	Colonsay, Scotland, United Kingdom	UTC±00:00	Mar–Oct
CSB	LRCS	Caransebeș Airport	Caransebeș, Romania	UTC+02:00	Mar–Oct
CSC	MRMJ	Cañas Mojica Airport	Cañas, Costa Rica	UTC−06:00	
CSD		Cresswell Downs Airport	Cresswell Downs, Northern Territory, Australia	UTC+09:30	
CSE		Buckhorn Ranch Airport (FAA: 0CO2)	Crested Butte, Colorado, United States	UTC−07:00	Mar–Nov
CSF	LFPC	Creil Air Base	Creil, Picardy, France	UTC+01:00	Mar–Oct
CSG	KCSG	Columbus Airport	Columbus, Georgia, United States	UTC−05:00	Mar–Nov
CSH	ULAS	Solovki Airport	Solovetsky Islands, Arkhangelsk Oblast, Russia	UTC+03:00	
CSI	YCAS	Casino Airport	Casino, New South Wales, Australia	UTC+10:00	Oct–Apr
CSK	GOGS	Cap Skirring Airport	Cap Skirring, Senegal	UTC±00:00	
CSM	KCSM	Clinton-Sherman Airport	Clinton, Oklahoma, United States	UTC−06:00	Mar–Nov
CSN	KCXP	Carson Airport (FAA: CXP)	Carson City, Nevada, United States	UTC−08:00	Mar–Nov
CSO	EDBC	Magdeburg–Cochstedt Airport	Magdeburg, Saxony-Anhalt, Germany	UTC+01:00	Mar–Oct
CSQ	KCSQ	Creston Municipal Airport	Creston, Iowa, United States	UTC−06:00	Mar–Nov
CSR		Casuarito Airport	Casuarito, Colombia	UTC−05:00	
CSS	SSCL	Cassilândia Airport	Cassilândia, Mato Grosso do Sul, Brazil	UTC−04:00	
CST	NFCS	Castaway Island Seaplane Base	Castaway Island, Mamanuca Islands, Fiji	UTC+12:00	Nov–Jan
CSU		Santa Cruz do Sul Airport	Santa Cruz do Sul, Rio Grande do Sul, Brazil	UTC−03:00	
CSV	KCSV	Crossville Memorial-Whitson Field	Crossville, Tennessee, United States	UTC−06:00	Mar–Nov
CSX	ZGHA	Changsha Huanghua International Airport	Changsha, Hunan, China	UTC+08:00	
CSY	UWKS	Cheboksary Airport	Cheboksary, Chuvashia, Russia	UTC+03:00	
CSZ	SAZC	Brigadier Hector Eduardo Ruiz Airport	Coronel Suárez, Buenos Aires, Argentina	UTC−03:00	
-CT-
CTA	LICC	Catania–Fontanarossa Airport	Catania, Sicily, Italy	UTC+01:00	Mar–Oct
CTB	KCTB	Cut Bank Municipal Airport	Cut Bank, Montana, United States	UTC−07:00	Mar–Nov
CTC	SANC	Coronel Felipe Varela International Airport	Catamarca, Catamarca, Argentina	UTC−03:00	
CTD	MPCE	Chitré Alonso Valderrama Airport	Chitré, Panama	UTC−05:00	
CTE		Cartí Airport	Cartí, Panama	UTC−05:00	
CTF	MGCT	Coatepeque Airport	Coatepeque, Guatemala	UTC−06:00	
CTG	SKCG	Rafael Núñez International Airport	Cartagena, Colombia	UTC−05:00	
CTH	KMQS	Chester County G. O. Carlson Airport (FAA: MQS)	Coatesville, Pennsylvania, United States	UTC−05:00	Mar–Nov
CTI	FNCV	Cuito Cuanavale Airport	Cuito Cuanavale, Angola	UTC+01:00	
CTK		Canton Municipal Airport (FAA: 7G9)	Canton, South Dakota, United States	UTC−06:00	Mar–Nov
CTL	YBCV	Charleville Airport	Charleville, Queensland, Australia	UTC+10:00	
CTM	MMCM	Chetumal International Airport	Chetumal, Quintana Roo, Mexico	UTC−05:00	
CTN	YCKN	Cooktown Airport	Cooktown, Queensland, Australia	UTC+10:00	
CTO		Calverton Executive Airpark (FAA: 3C8)	Calverton, New York, United States	UTC−05:00	Mar–Nov
CTP	SNCP	Carutapera Airport	Carutapera, Maranhão, Brazil	UTC−03:00	
CTQ	SSVP	Do Palmar Airport	Santa Vitória, Rio Grande do Sul, Brazil	UTC−03:00	
CTR		Cattle Creek Airport	Cattle Creek, Northern Territory, Australia	UTC+09:30	
CTS	RJCC	New Chitose Airport	Sapporo, Hokkaido, Japan	UTC+09:00	
CTT	LFMQ	Le Castellet Airport	Le Castellet, Provence-Alpes-Côte d'Azur, France	UTC+01:00	Mar–Oct
CTU	ZUUU	Chengdu Shuangliu International Airport	Chengdu, Sichuan, China	UTC+08:00	
CTW		Cottonwood Airport (FAA: P52)	Cottonwood, Arizona, United States	UTC−07:00	
CTX		Cortland County Airport (Chase Field, FAA: N03)	Cortland, New York, United States	UTC−05:00	Mar–Nov
CTY	KCTY	Cross City Airport	Cross City, Florida, United States	UTC−05:00	Mar–Nov
CTZ	KCTZ	Clinton–Sampson County Airport	Clinton, North Carolina, United States	UTC−05:00	Mar–Nov
-CU-
CUA	MMDA	Ciudad Constitución Airport	Ciudad Constitución, Baja California Sur, Mexico	UTC−07:00	Apr–Oct
CUB	KCUB	Jim Hamilton–L.B. Owens Airport	Columbia, South Carolina, United States	UTC−05:00	Mar–Nov
CUC	SKCC	Camilo Daza International Airport	Cúcuta, Colombia	UTC−05:00	
CUD	YCDR	Caloundra Airport	Caloundra, Queensland, Australia	UTC+10:00	
CUE	SECU	Mariscal Lamar International Airport	Cuenca, Ecuador	UTC−05:00	
CUF	LIMZ	Cuneo International Airport	Cuneo, Piedmont, Italy	UTC+01:00	Mar–Oct
CUG	YCUA	Cudal Airport	Cudal, New South Wales, Australia	UTC+10:00	Oct–Apr
CUH	KCUH	Cushing Municipal Airport	Cushing, Oklahoma, United States	UTC−06:00	Mar–Nov
CUI		Curillo Airport	Curillo, Colombia	UTC−05:00	
CUJ		Culion Airport	Culion, Philippines	UTC+08:00	
CUK		Caye Caulker Airport	Caye Caulker, Belize	UTC−06:00	
CUL	MMCL	Bachigualato Federal International Airport	Culiacán, Sinaloa, Mexico	UTC−07:00	Apr–Oct
CUM	SVCU	Antonio José de Sucre Airport	Cumaná, Venezuela	UTC−04:00	
CUN	MMUN	Cancún International Airport	Cancún, Quintana Roo, Mexico	UTC−05:00	
CUO	SKCR	Caruru Airport	Caruru, Colombia	UTC−05:00	
CUP	SVCP	General José Francisco Bermúdez Airport	Carúpano, Venezuela	UTC−04:00	
CUQ	YCOE	Coen Airport	Coen, Queensland, Australia	UTC+10:00	
CUR	TNCC	Curaçao International Airport (Hato Int'l Airport)	Willemstad, Curaçao	UTC−04:00	
CUS		Columbus Municipal Airport (FAA: 0NM0)	Columbus, New Mexico, United States	UTC−07:00	Mar–Nov
CUT	SAZW	Cutral Có Airport	Cutral Có, Neuquén, Argentina	UTC−03:00	
CUU	MMCU	General Roberto Fierro Villalobos International Airport	Chihuahua, Chihuahua, Mexico	UTC−07:00	Apr–Oct
CUV	SVCG	Casigua El Cubo Airport	Casigua El Cubo, Venezuela	UTC−04:00	
CUX		Cuddihy Field (FAA: 07TE)	Corpus Christi, Texas, United States	UTC−06:00	Mar–Nov
CUY	YCUE	Cue Airport	Cue, Western Australia, Australia	UTC+08:00	
CUZ	SPZO	Alejandro Velasco Astete International Airport	Cusco, Peru	UTC−05:00	
-CV-
CVB	AYCB	Chungrebu Airport	Chungrebu, Papua New Guinea	UTC+10:00	
CVC	YCEE	Cleve Airport	Cleve, South Australia, Australia	UTC+09:30	Oct–Apr
CVE	SKCV	Coveñas Airport	Coveñas, Colombia	UTC−05:00	
CVF	LFLJ	Courchevel Altiport	Courchevel, Rhône-Alpes, France	UTC+01:00	Mar–Oct
CVG	KCVG	Cincinnati/Northern Kentucky International Airport	Hebron (near Cincinnati/OH), Kentucky, United States	UTC−05:00	Mar–Nov
CVH		Caviahue Airport	Caviahue, Neuquén, Argentina	UTC−03:00	
CVI		Caleta Olivia Airport	Caleta Olivia, Santa Cruz, Argentina	UTC−03:00	
CVJ	MMCB	General Mariano Matamoros Airport	Cuernavaca, Morelos, Mexico	UTC−06:00	Apr–Oct
CVL		Cape Vogel Airport	Cape Vogel, Papua New Guinea	UTC+10:00	
CVM	MMCV	General Pedro J. Méndez International Airport	Ciudad Victoria, Tamaulipas, Mexico	UTC−06:00	Apr–Oct
CVN	KCVN	Clovis Municipal Airport	Clovis, New Mexico, United States	UTC−07:00	Mar–Nov
CVO	KCVO	Corvallis Municipal Airport	Corvallis, Oregon, United States	UTC−08:00	Mar–Nov
CVQ	YCAR	Carnarvon Airport	Carnarvon, Western Australia, Australia	UTC+08:00	
CVS	KCVS	Cannon Air Force Base	Clovis, New Mexico, United States	UTC−07:00	Mar–Nov
CVT	EGBE	Coventry Airport	Coventry, England, United Kingdom	UTC±00:00	Mar–Oct
CVU	LPCR	Corvo Airport	Corvo Island, Azores, Portugal	UTC−01:00	Mar–Oct
-CW-
CWA	KCWA	Central Wisconsin Airport	Wausau, Wisconsin, United States	UTC−06:00	Mar–Nov
CWB	SBCT	Afonso Pena International Airport	Curitiba, Paraná, Brazil	UTC−03:00	
CWC	UKLN	Chernivtsi International Airport	Chernivtsi, Ukraine	UTC+02:00	Mar–Oct
CWF	KCWF	Chennault International Airport	Lake Charles, Louisiana, United States	UTC−06:00	Mar–Nov
CWI	KCWI	Clinton Municipal Airport	Clinton, Iowa, United States	UTC−06:00	Mar–Nov
CWJ	ZPCW	Cangyuan Washan Airport	Nuoliang Township, China	UTC+08:00	
CWL	EGFF	Cardiff Airport	Cardiff, Wales, United Kingdom	UTC±00:00	Mar–Oct
CWR	YCWI	Cowarie Airport	Cowarie, South Australia, Australia	UTC+09:30	Oct–Apr
CWS		Center Island Airport (FAA: 78WA)	Center Island, Washington, United States	UTC−08:00	Mar–Nov
CWT	YCWR	Cowra Airport	Cowra, New South Wales, Australia	UTC+10:00	Oct–Apr
CWW	YCOR	Corowa Airport	Corowa, New South Wales, Australia	UTC+10:00	Oct–Apr
CWX		Cochise County Airport (FAA: P33)	Willcox, Arizona, United States	UTC−07:00	
-CX-
CXA	SVCD	Caicara del Orinoco Airport	Caicara del Orinoco, Venezuela	UTC−04:00	
CXB	VGCB	Cox's Bazar Airport	Cox's Bazar, Bangladesh	UTC+06:00	
CXC		Chitina Airport	Chitina, Alaska, United States	UTC−09:00	Mar–Nov
CXF	PACX	Coldfoot Airport	Coldfoot, Alaska, United States	UTC−09:00	Mar–Nov
CXH	CYHC	Vancouver Harbour Flight Centre (Coal Harbour Seaplane Base)	Vancouver, British Columbia, Canada	UTC−08:00	Mar–Nov
CXI	PLCH	Cassidy International Airport	Christmas Island, Kiribati	UTC+14:00	
CXJ	SBCX	Caxias do Sul Airport (Hugo Cantergiani Regional Airport)	Caxias do Sul, Rio Grande do Sul, Brazil	UTC−03:00	
CXL	KCXL	Calexico International Airport	Calexico, California, United States	UTC−08:00	Mar–Nov
CXN	HCMC	Candala Airport	Candala, Somalia	UTC+03:00	
CXO	KCXO	Lone Star Executive Airport	Houston, Texas, United States	UTC−06:00	Mar–Nov
CXP	WIHL	Tunggul Wulung Airport	Cilacap, Indonesia	UTC+07:00	
CXQ	YCRK	Christmas Creek Airport	Christmas Creek Station, Western Australia, Australia	UTC+08:00	
CXR	VVCR	Cam Ranh International Airport	Cam Ranh, Vietnam	UTC+07:00	
CXT	YCHT	Charters Towers Airport	Charters Towers, Queensland, Australia	UTC+10:00	
CXY	MYCC	Cat Cay Airport	Cat Cays, Bimini, Bahamas	UTC−05:00	Mar–Nov
-CY-
CYA	MTCA	Antoine-Simon Airport	Les Cayes, Haiti	UTC−05:00	Mar–Nov
CYB	MWCB	Charles Kirkconnell International Airport	Cayman Brac, British Overseas Territory of Cayman Islands	UTC−05:00	
CYC		Caye Chapel Airport	Caye Chapel, Belize	UTC−06:00	
CYD	MZMF	San Ignacio Town Airstrip	San Ignacio, Belize	UTC−06:00	
CYF	PACK	Chefornak Airport (FAA: CFK)	Chefornak, Alaska, United States	UTC−09:00	Mar–Nov
CYG	YCRG	Corryong Airport	Corryong, Victoria (Australia)|Victoria, Australia	UTC+10:00	Oct–Apr
CYI	RCKU	Chiayi Airport	Chiayi, Taiwan	UTC+08:00	
CYL	MHCS	Coyoles Airport	Coyoles, Honduras	UTC−06:00	
CYM		Chatham Seaplane Base	Chatham, Alaska, United States	UTC−09:00	Mar–Nov
CYO	MUCL	Vilo Acuña Airport	Cayo Largo del Sur, Cuba	UTC−05:00	Mar–Nov
CYP	RPVC	Calbayog Airport	Calbayog, Philippines	UTC+08:00	
CYR	SUCA	Colonia Airport (Laguna de los Patos Intn'l Airport)	Colonia del Sacramento, Uruguay	UTC−03:00	
CYS	KCYS	Cheyenne Regional Airport (Jerry Olson Field)	Cheyenne, Wyoming, United States	UTC−07:00	Mar–Nov
CYT	PACY	Yakataga Airport	Yakataga, Alaska, United States	UTC−09:00	Mar–Nov
CYU	RPLO	Cuyo Airport	Cuyo, Philippines	UTC+08:00	
CYW	MMCY	Captain Rogelio Castillo National Airport	Celaya, Guanajuato, Mexico	UTC−06:00	Apr–Oct
CYX	UESS	Chersky Airport	Chersky, Yakutia, Russia	UTC+11:00	
CYZ	RPUY	Cauayan Airport	Cauayan, Philippines	UTC+08:00	
-CZ-
CZA	MMCT	Chichen Itza International Airport	Chichen Itza, Yucatán, Mexico	UTC−06:00	Apr–Oct
CZB		Carlos Ruhl Airport	Cruz Alta, Rio Grande do Sul, Brazil	UTC−03:00	
CZC		Copper Center 2 Airport (FAA: Z93)	Copper Center, Alaska, United States	UTC−09:00	Mar–Nov
CZE	SVCR	José Leonardo Chirino Airport	Coro, Venezuela	UTC−04:00	
CZF	PACZ	Cape Romanzof LRRS Airport	Cape Romanzof, Alaska, United States	UTC−09:00	Mar–Nov
CZH		Corozal Airport	Corozal, Belize	UTC−06:00	
CZJ		Corazón de Jesús Airport	Corazón de Jesús, Panama	UTC−05:00	
CZK	KCZK	Cascade Locks State Airport	Cascade Locks, Oregon, United States	UTC−08:00	Mar–Nov
CZL	DABC	Mohamed Boudiaf International Airport	Constantine, Algeria	UTC+01:00	
CZM	MMCZ	Cozumel International Airport	Cozumel, Quintana Roo, Mexico	UTC−05:00	
CZN		Chisana Airport	Chisana, Alaska, United States	UTC−09:00	Mar–Nov
CZO		Chistochina Airport	Chistochina, Alaska, United States	UTC−09:00	Mar–Nov
CZP		Cape Pole Seaplane Base (FAA: Z71)	Cape Pole, Alaska, United States	UTC−09:00	Mar–Nov
CZS	SBCZ	Cruzeiro do Sul International Airport	Cruzeiro do Sul, Acre, Brazil	UTC−05:00	
CZT	KCZT	Dimmit County Airport	Carrizo Springs, Texas, United States	UTC−06:00	Mar–Nov
CZU	SKCZ	Las Brujas Airport	Corozal, Colombia	UTC−05:00	
CZW	EPCH	Częstochowa-Rudniki Airport	Częstochowa, Poland	UTC+01:00	Mar–Oct
CZX	ZSCG	Changzhou Benniu Airport	Changzhou, Jiangsu, China	UTC+08:00	
CZY	YUNY	Cluny Airport	Cluny, Queensland, Australia	UTC+10:00	

== Notes ==
- ^1 Morocco temporarily suspends DST for the month of Ramadan.
- ^2 CHI is the common IATA code for O'Hare International Airport (IATA: ORD), Midway International Airport (IATA: MDW), DuPage Airport (IATA: DPA), Gary/Chicago International Airport (IATA: GYY), Chicago Executive Airport (IATA: PWK) and Chicago Rockford International Airport (IATA: RFD).
