= CYT =

CYT may refer to:

- Christian Youth Theater
- Yakataga Airport, IATA code
- Cyt proteins, a type of Bacillus thuringiensis Delta endotoxin
