= Chile Chico Airfield =

Airport in the Aysén Region of Chile

Chile Chico Airport
- IATA: CCH; ICAO: SCCC

Summary
- Airport type: Public
- Serves: Chile Chico, Chile
- Elevation AMSL: 1,070 ft / 326 m
- Coordinates: 46°34′55″S 71°41′15″W

Map
- Location of Chile Chico Airport in Chile

Runways
Direction	Length		Surface
Direction	m	ft	Surface
12/30	1,200	3,937	Asphalt
- Source: Landings.com Google Maps GCM

Chile Chico Airport (Spanish: Aeródromo Chile Chico, (IATA: CCH, ICAO: SCCC)) is an airport serving Chile Chico, a lakeside town in the Aysén Region of Chile. Chile Chico is on the south shore of General Carrera Lake, 3 kilometres (1.9 mi) west of the Argentina border. The airport is 5 kilometres (3.1 mi) southeast of the town.

There is rising terrain west of the airport.

== See also ==
- Transport in Chile
- List of airports in Chile
