= Coveñas Airport =

Airport in Colombia

- IATA: CVE; ICAO: SKCV

Summary
- Airport type: Military
- Serves: Coveñas, Colombia
- Elevation AMSL: 31 ft / 9 m
- Coordinates: 9°24′03″N 75°41′30″W

Map
- Location of the airport in Colombia

Runways
Direction	Length		Surface
Direction	m	ft	Surface
06/24	1,340	4,396	Asphalt
- Sources: GCM Google Maps

Coveñas Airport (IATA: CVE, ICAO: SKCV) is a military airport serving the Caribbean coast town of Coveñas in the Sucre Department of Colombia. The runway is adjacent to the shore, and north departures and arrivals are over the Gulf of Morrosquillo.

== Airlines and destinations ==
Airlines	Destinations
SARPA	Seasonal charter: Medellin-Olaya Herrera

== See also ==
- Transport in Colombia
- List of airports in Colombia
