= Catriel =

Coordinates: 37°52′S 67°50′W

Catriel (Río Negro)
- Municipality and village
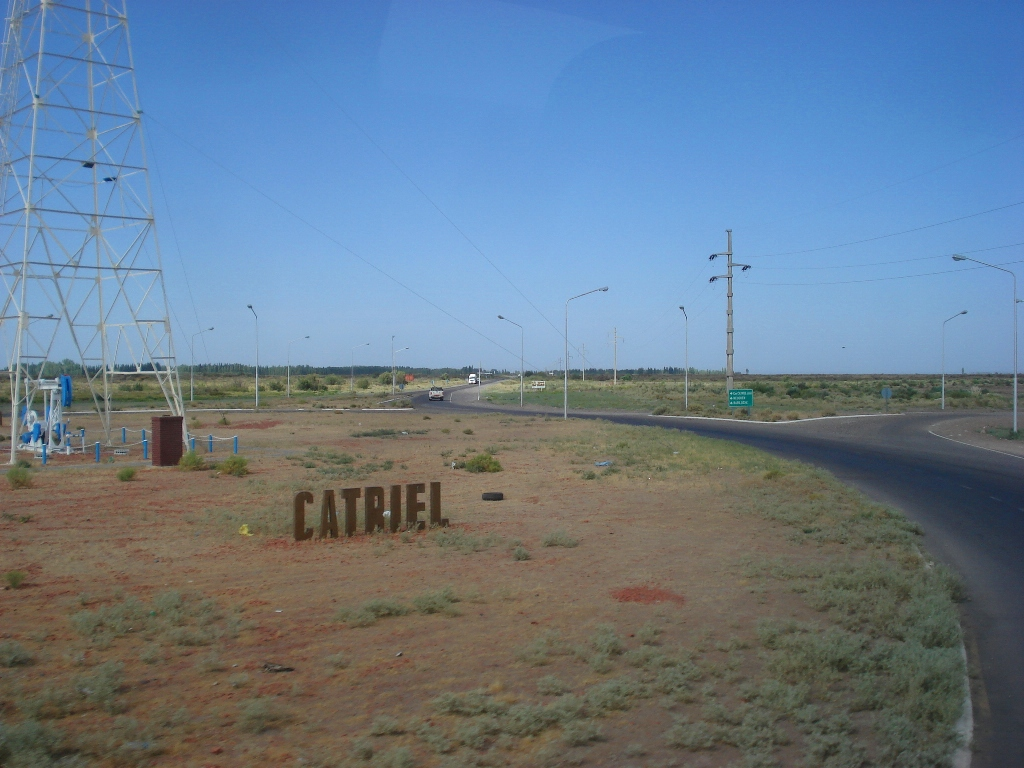
- Interactive map of Catriel (Río Negro)
- Country: Argentina
- Province: Río Negro Province
- Time zone: UTC−3 (ART)
- Climate: BWk

Colonia Catriel, or simply Catriel, is a town in the northern tip of the province of Río Negro, Argentina, near the border with La Pampa Province. It has a population of about 18,000, with postal code 8307 and telephone prefix 0299.

Catriel was named after Cacique Catriel, a Native American who according to several stories participated in the defence of Argentine government interests against aborigines.

The town has a dry and temperate climate, with hot summers and winters which barely see snow. A characteristic dry strong wind is also common.

The main economic activity in and around the town is oil extraction, which started in 1959 and made the city grow fast, as state owned YPF set extraction points nearby. However, nowadays the main oil company in the city is Petrobras, which has made several investments in the city.

== Transport ==
The town is served by the Colonia Catriel Airport (IATA: CCT).
