= Circle Hot Springs, Alaska =

Unincorporated community in the state of Alaska, United States

- Unincorporated community
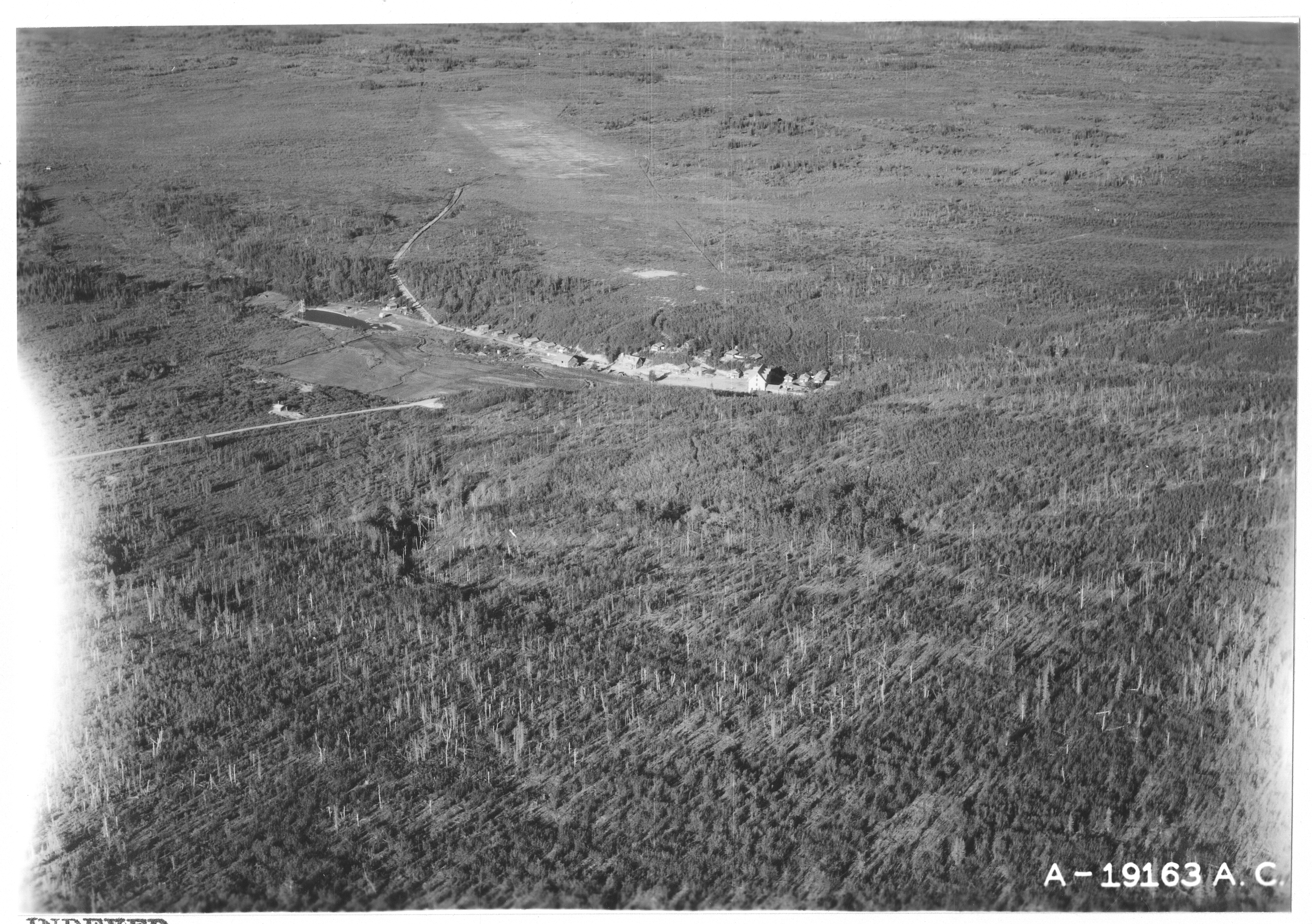
- Circle Hot Springs in 1941

- Location within Alaska
- Coordinates: 65°29′00″N 144°38′03″W
- Country: United States
- State: Alaska
- Census Area: Yukon-Koyukuk

Government
  - State senator: Click Bishop (R)
  - State rep.: Dave Talerico (R)
- Elevation: 906 ft (276 m)
- Time zone: UTC-9 (Alaska (AKST))
  - Summer (DST): UTC-8 (AKDT)
- ZIP code: 99730
- Area code: 907
- GNIS feature ID: 1416507

Circle Hot Springs is a hot spring and an unincorporated community in the Yukon-Koyukuk Census Area of Alaska in the United States. The community is home to a hot spring and is the site of the now-closed Arctic Circle Hot Springs resort. The hot spring can be accessed either by automobile via the Steese Highway or by plane via the small-scale Circle Hot Springs Airport. The area surrounding the hot spring is rich in mining history and retains a certain degree of mystery and folklore.

== Geography ==
Circle Hot Springs is located at 65°29' N, 144°38' W. Central, Alaska is the nearest community, located 8 miles east of the hot spring. Fairbanks, Alaska is 131 miles SW on the Steese Highway.

== Climate ==
Circle Hot Springs has a continental subarctic climate (Köppen Dfc).

Climate data for Circle Hot Springs
Month	Jan	Feb	Mar	Apr	May	Jun	Jul	Aug	Sep	Oct	Nov	Dec	Year
Record high °F (°C)	49 (9)	51 (11)	51 (11)	68 (20)	90 (32)	94 (34)	94 (34)	88 (31)	78 (26)	71 (22)	51 (11)	45 (7)	94 (34)
Mean daily maximum °F (°C)	−10.4 (−23.6)	−2.9 (−19.4)	12.2 (−11.0)	36.9 (2.7)	57.1 (13.9)	70.1 (21.2)	71.1 (21.7)	65.2 (18.4)	50.8 (10.4)	26.4 (−3.1)	4.9 (−15.1)	−4.4 (−20.2)	31.4 (−0.3)
Mean daily minimum °F (°C)	−25.4 (−31.9)	−20.4 (−29.1)	−12 (−24)	11.7 (−11.3)	31.1 (−0.5)	43.8 (6.6)	47.6 (8.7)	42.5 (5.8)	30.2 (−1.0)	12.4 (−10.9)	−9.2 (−22.9)	−19.7 (−28.7)	11.1 (−11.6)
Record low °F (°C)	−60 (−51)	−57 (−49)	−44 (−42)	−26 (−32)	−8 (−22)	27 (−3)	25 (−4)	20 (−7)	−5 (−21)	−28 (−33)	−51 (−46)	−60 (−51)	−60 (−51)
Average precipitation inches (mm)	0.52 (13)	0.31 (7.9)	0.26 (6.6)	0.44 (11)	0.7 (18)	1.92 (49)	2.17 (55)	1.79 (45)	1.19 (30)	0.92 (23)	0.45 (11)	0.48 (12)	11.15 (283)
Average snowfall inches (cm)	7.7 (20)	5.8 (15)	5 (13)	5.2 (13)	0.6 (1.5)	0 (0)	0 (0)	0 (0)	2.2 (5.6)	12.9 (33)	8.6 (22)	7.8 (20)	55.7 (141)
Average precipitation days	7	7	6	5	8	12	14	13	11	11	9	8	111

Climate data for Circle Hot Springs, Alaska, 1991–2020 normals: 860ft (262m)
Month	Jan	Feb	Mar	Apr	May	Jun	Jul	Aug	Sep	Oct	Nov	Dec	Year
Mean daily maximum °F (°C)	−8.6 (−22.6)	0.5 (−17.5)	14.7 (−9.6)	39.5 (4.2)	58.9 (14.9)	71.1 (21.7)	72.4 (22.4)	64.8 (18.2)	52.2 (11.2)	27.4 (−2.6)	3.9 (−15.6)	−4.5 (−20.3)	32.7 (0.4)
Daily mean °F (°C)	−15.6 (−26.4)	−9.2 (−22.9)	0.9 (−17.3)	25.3 (−3.7)	44.9 (7.2)	56.4 (13.6)	58.9 (14.9)	51.8 (11.0)	40.0 (4.4)	18.8 (−7.3)	−4.1 (−20.1)	−12.1 (−24.5)	21.3 (−5.9)
Mean daily minimum °F (°C)	−22.6 (−30.3)	−18.9 (−28.3)	−13.0 (−25.0)	11.0 (−11.7)	30.9 (−0.6)	41.6 (5.3)	45.4 (7.4)	38.9 (3.8)	27.9 (−2.3)	10.2 (−12.1)	−12.2 (−24.6)	−19.8 (−28.8)	10.0 (−12.3)
Average precipitation inches (mm)	0.44 (11)	0.32 (8.1)	0.17 (4.3)	0.25 (6.4)	0.71 (18)	2.64 (67)	2.61 (66)	1.80 (46)	1.35 (34)	0.84 (21)	0.44 (11)	0.48 (12)	12.05 (304.8)
Source: NOAA

== History ==
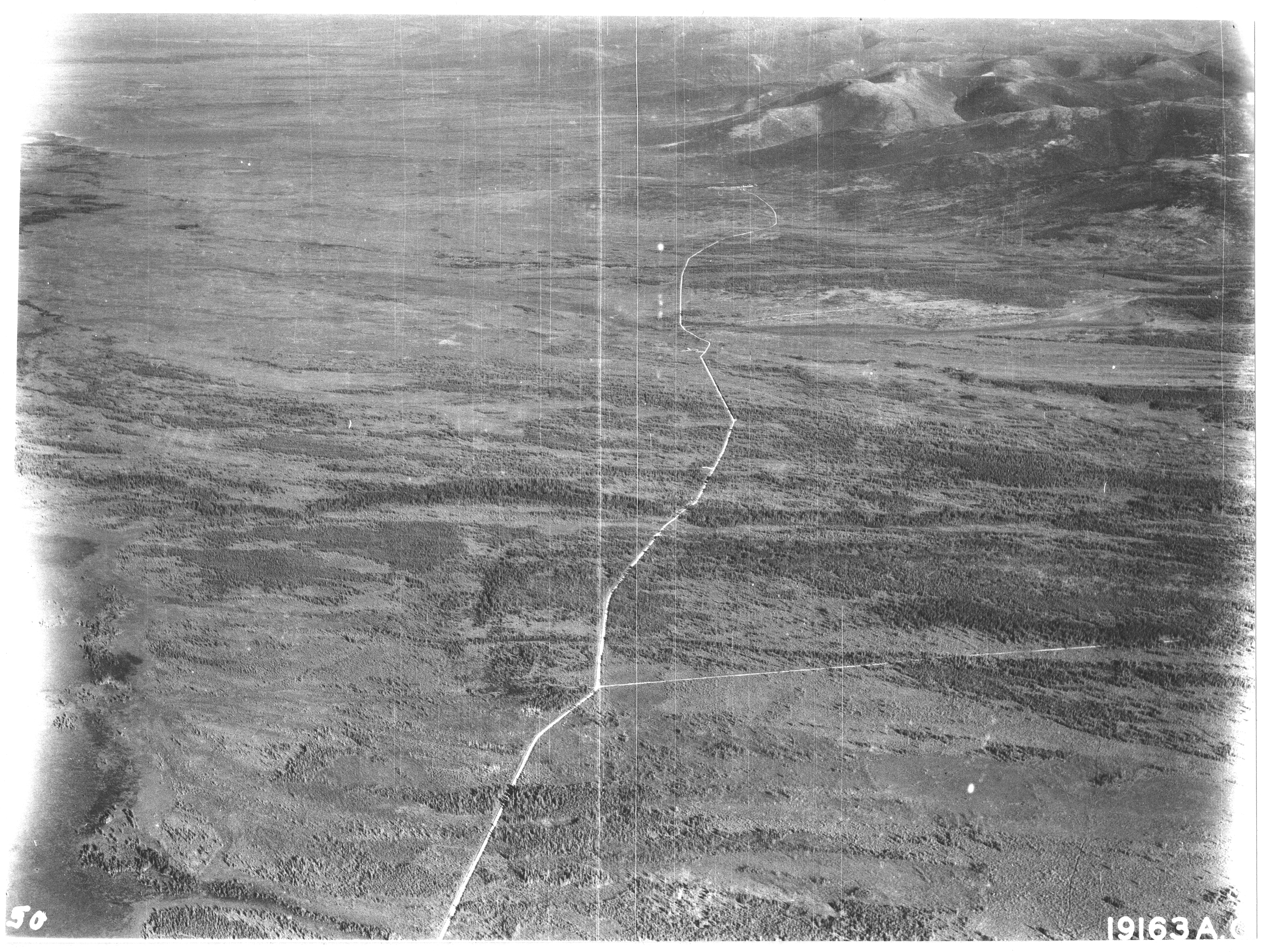
Road to Circle Hot Springs

William Greats first recorded the hot spring in 1893, but it had been used previously by the indigenous Athabascan inhabitants. Franklin Leach homesteaded 160 acres of the area around the hot springs in 1905 and started construction on a resort sometime thereafter.

Circle City, now referred to as just Circle, (41.2 miles NE of Circle Hot Springs) was originally a mining supply town that was established in 1893. Circle Hot Springs was established by L. N. Jack McQuesten in 1887. The trading post in Circle and its surrounding vicinity were thought to have been on the Arctic Circle, despite that latitudinal marker being 40 miles to the north. Circle-area gold was a huge draw for prospectors, who sought out the remote area in search of their fortunes. Some prospectors even came to use Circle Hot Springs as a haven from the harsh interior Alaska winters. Mining interest in the area decreased drastically after gold was found in the Klondike in 1897, and then in Nome in 1899. A limited number of miners stayed in the area near Circle Hot Spring after the turn of the century, and gold mining continues to be an attraction to this day.

The "Circle Springs" post office was established in 1924. Hoping to attract Fairbanks residents, in addition to local miners, the resort owner Frank Leach built a 1600-foot landing strip. Noel Wien made the inaugural landing there in 1924. It was not until March 1930 that construction on a hotel began, due to local roads being unreliable. The population of the resort was 17 in 1930; 14 in 1939; and 36 in 1958.

== Demographics ==
Historical population
Census	Pop.	Note	%±
1930	17		—
1940	14		−17.6%
1990	29		—
U.S. Decennial Census

Circle Hot Springs first appeared on the 1930 U.S. Census as an unincorporated village. It appeared again on the 1940 census. It did not appear again until 1990 when it was called Circle Hot Springs Station CDP (census-designated place). Beginning in 2000, it was merged into Central CDP.

== Attractions ==
Although the Arctic Circle Hot Springs resort is now closed for business, the area still sees a handful of visitors throughout the year seeking a dip in the abandoned hot springs, on a quest to spot the northern lights, or in search of undiscovered pockets of gold. The resort is also considered a paranormal destination by many ghost hunters in the interior. Ray Bonnell, a Fairbanks Daily Newsminer writer noted in a 2013 article that:

"In its heyday Circle Hot Springs attracted visitors from all over Alaska and beyond, and was well-known for its aurora viewing. The hotel supposedly even has its own ghost. Some employees are reported to have seen or felt the specter of Emma Leach [wife of Franklin Leach] roaming the halls or haunting the kitchen"

Ron Wendt, another author and paranormal enthusiast, has written about the spooky nature of the hot springs in his book Haunted Alaska. In one section he relates his personal experiences as a child at the hot springs:

"I can attest to the creakiness and the air of mystery in these ancient abodes. But youngsters often see this sort of thing as fun— never realizing that someone might be watching. We never met a ghost, but as I learned later, not everyone can say that."

The Alaska government has officially condemned the site. However, as of January 2023, the hot spring pool is still in usable condition, although there is about 4 inches of weed growing on the sides and bottom of the pool.

Some of the buildings have evidence of being inhabited by squatters in summer 2022. The main building is filled with the scent of rot and the walls and ceilings are covered in mold.

== See also ==
- List of hot springs in the United States § Alaska
