= Christmas Creek Airport =

Airport in Kimberley region of Western Australia

- IATA: CXQ; ICAO: YCRK

Summary
- Airport type: Public
- Location: Christmas Creek Station, Western Australia
- Elevation AMSL: 125 ft (38 m)
- Coordinates: 18°52′18.8″S 125°56′03.9″E

Map
- Location in Western Australia

Runways
Direction	Length		Surface
Direction	m	ft	Surface
	1,100	3,609

Christmas Creek Airport (IATA: CXQ, ICAO: YCRK) is an airport serving Christmas Creek Station in Western Australia.

== Facilities ==
The airport resides at an elevation of 125 ft (38 m) above sea level. It has one runway that is 1,100 m (3,609 ft) in length.

== Airlines and destinations ==
Airlines	Destinations
Qantas	Perth
QantasLink	Broome, Brusselton, Perth
