= Camocim Airport =

Airport in Brazil

Camocim Airport Aeroporto de Camocim
- IATA: CMC; ICAO: SNWC; LID: CE0011

Summary
- Airport type: Public
- Operator: Infraero (2023–2025); Visac Aeroportos (2025-present)
- Serves: Camocim
- Time zone: BRT (UTC−03:00)
- Elevation AMSL: 14 m / 46 ft
- Coordinates: 02°53′45″S 040°51′32″W
- Website: www4.infraero.gov.br/aeroporto-camocim/

Map
- Location in Brazil

Runways
Direction	Length		Surface
Direction	m	ft	Surface
14/32	1,200	3,937	Asphalt

Statistics (2024)
- Passengers: 538
- Aircraft operations: 166
- Metric tonnes of cargo: 0
- Statistics: Infraero; Sources: Airport Website, ANAC, DECEA

Camocim Airport (IATA: CMC, ICAO: SNWC), is an airport serving Camocim, Brazil.

It is managed by contract by Visac Aeroportos.

== History ==
Previously operated by Infraero, on April 22, 2025, the State of Ceará signed a one-year contract of operation with Visac Aeroportos.

== Airlines and destinations ==
No scheduled flights operate at this airport.

== Access ==
The airport is located 2 km (1 mi) from downtown Camocim.

== See also ==
- List of airports in Brazil
