= Coveñas =

- Municipality and city
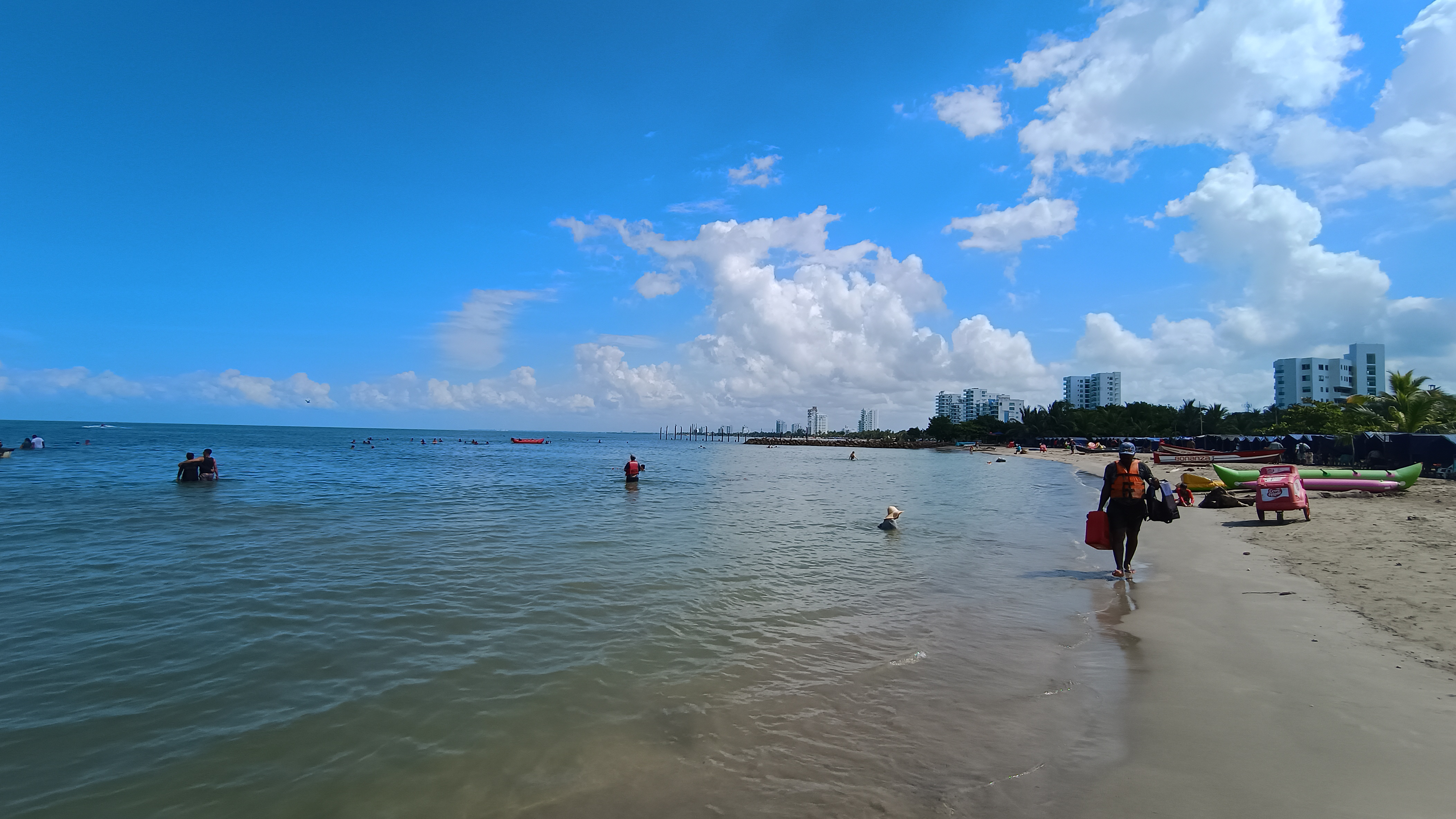
- Coveñas

- Flag Coat of arms

- Location of the municipality and city of Coveñas in the Sucre Department of Colombia.

- Location in Colombia
- Coordinates: 9.41667°N 75.7°W
- Country: Colombia
- Department: Sucre Department

Population (Census 2018)
  - Total: 17,091
- Time zone: UTC-5 (Colombia Standard Time)

Coveñas is a resort city and municipality located in the Sucre Department, northern Colombia. It was established in the 16th century as a port for slave traders, then it became an oil port in the twentieth century. It was classified as a municipality (a city with its own administration) in 2002. The city is now a popular resort for the people from the Colombian Andean region.

== History ==
The area was founded in 1560 as a slave port. After the abolition of slavery in the mid-1800s, it became a meat trading port. In 1971, oil was discovered in the area, and soon, many Colombian oil companies started to settle there. In the late 1970s, hotels were built to promote tourism. It became a city and municipality in 2002.

== Tourism ==
Coveñas has undergone significant tourist development since the 1960s, initially oriented more towards the local and regional population. Since the 70s, due to the characteristics of its sea, its beaches and the existence of a more appropriate infrastructure to offer services and amenities to tourists, this field of the Coveñas economy began to grow in importance nationally and in the 21st century the hotel industry has increased significantly, offering tourist services more suited to current demands. The administration of the municipality has in tourism, a very important source of development possibilities in which to intervene in a positive manner so that it will benefit the community and the region. This line of the economy should be one of the priorities of investment and support of the municipality.

== Transportation ==
There are many bus services that go from Tolú. There are also boats, however, there are no marinas in the area. A boat can come from Tolú and come straight to the beaches. People will have to go on the beaches and walk out into shallow waters to get on their boat. The city is served by Coveñas Airport, which is a military airport that offers some charter flights from time to time.
