= Caiguna Airport =

Airport in Western Australia

Coordinates: 32°16′51″S 125°28′39″E

Caiguna Airport (YCAG) is an airport in Western Australia. It is located near Caiguna in the municipality of Shire of Dundas in the southeastern part of the state, 914 km east of the capital, Perth.

It is close to the Eyre Highway.

The nearest air landing locations are:

YCKY Cocklebiddy Airport - 63 km
YADD Arubiddy Airport - 67 km
YDPT Depot Outcamp Airport - 83 km

Caiguna Airport is 107 meters above sea level. The terrain around the Caiguna Airport is very flat. The highest point in the vicinity is 122 metres above sea level, 1.4 km west of Caiguna Airport.

The surrounding land near Caiguna Airport is essentially an open scrubland. A cold steppe climate prevails in the area. The average annual temperature in the area is 18 °C. The warmest month is January, when the average temperature is 26 °C and the coldest is July, with 10 °C. The average annual rainfall is 353 millimeters. The wettest month is January, with an average of 65 mm of precipitation, and the driest is August, with 3 mm of rainfall.
