= Cape Yakataga, Alaska =

Community in Alaska, United States

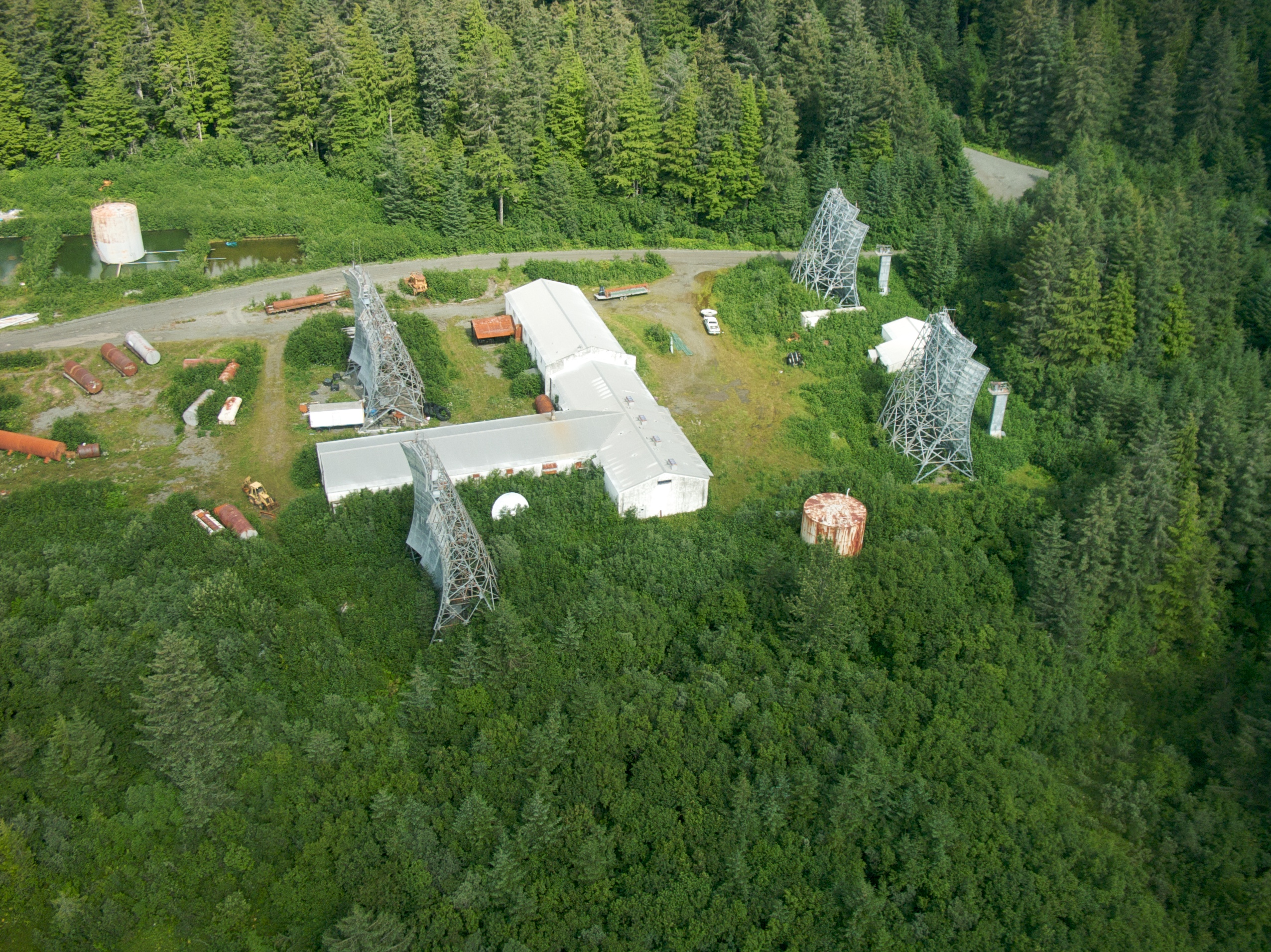
Buildings at Cape Yakataga

Cape Yakataga is a community in the City and Borough of Yakutat of the U.S. state of Alaska. Also known as Yakataga, its coordinates are 60°03′59″N 142°25′51″W and its elevation is 20 feet (6 m).

Yakataga is a Native American name meaning "canoe road", a reference to two reefs which form a canoe passage to the village. A United States Post Office was established at Cape Yakataga in 1935.

Cape Yakataga is served by the Yakataga Airport, which until 2012 had scheduled passenger service subsidized by the U.S. Essential Air Service program. Air service was withdrawn when, in consultation with the United States Department of Labor and examination of State of Alaska Permanent Fund Division records, it was determined that the location no longer had permanent residents.

== Demographics ==
Historical population
Census	Pop.	Note	%±
1960	48		—
U.S. Decennial Census

Yakataga appeared once on the 1960 U.S. Census as an unincorporated village. It is now located within the City and Borough of Yakutat.

== Climate ==
Cape Yakataga has a subarctic climate (Köppen: Dfc).

Climate data for Cape Yakataga
Month	Jan	Feb	Mar	Apr	May	Jun	Jul	Aug	Sep	Oct	Nov	Dec	Year
Record high °F (°C)	59 (15)	54 (12)	55 (13)	66 (19)	70 (21)	77 (25)	78 (26)	76 (24)	71 (22)	61 (16)	59 (15)	53 (12)	78 (26)
Mean maximum °F (°C)	44.8 (7.1)	44.8 (7.1)	46.8 (8.2)	53.7 (12.1)	60.1 (15.6)	63.1 (17.3)	66.3 (19.1)	65.2 (18.4)	62.7 (17.1)	55.5 (13.1)	49.6 (9.8)	45.2 (7.3)	69.0 (20.6)
Mean daily maximum °F (°C)	32.8 (0.4)	36.8 (2.7)	39.1 (3.9)	43.8 (6.6)	49.4 (9.7)	54.5 (12.5)	58.3 (14.6)	58.3 (14.6)	54.8 (12.7)	47.2 (8.4)	39.3 (4.1)	34.4 (1.3)	45.7 (7.6)
Daily mean °F (°C)	26.9 (−2.8)	30.0 (−1.1)	32.6 (0.3)	37.3 (2.9)	43.2 (6.2)	49.1 (9.5)	53.0 (11.7)	52.7 (11.5)	48.7 (9.3)	41.1 (5.1)	34.0 (1.1)	29.4 (−1.4)	39.8 (4.3)
Mean daily minimum °F (°C)	21.1 (−6.1)	24.1 (−4.4)	26.1 (−3.3)	30.7 (−0.7)	37.0 (2.8)	43.8 (6.6)	48.0 (8.9)	47.1 (8.4)	42.7 (5.9)	35.3 (1.8)	28.9 (−1.7)	24.3 (−4.3)	34.1 (1.2)
Mean minimum °F (°C)	5.9 (−14.5)	9.1 (−12.7)	12.7 (−10.7)	22.0 (−5.6)	29.0 (−1.7)	36.1 (2.3)	40.6 (4.8)	38.3 (3.5)	32.7 (0.4)	25.7 (−3.5)	17.0 (−8.3)	10.8 (−11.8)	2.0 (−16.7)
Record low °F (°C)	−29 (−34)	−15 (−26)	−11 (−24)	5 (−15)	20 (−7)	32 (0)	36 (2)	30 (−1)	28 (−2)	14 (−10)	−4 (−20)	−16 (−27)	−29 (−34)
Average precipitation inches (mm)	6.80 (173)	7.12 (181)	5.05 (128)	6.15 (156)	5.52 (140)	4.64 (118)	5.55 (141)	8.34 (212)	13.22 (336)	14.83 (377)	11.27 (286)	10.78 (274)	99.27 (2,521)
Average snowfall inches (cm)	18.2 (46)	21.3 (54)	16.3 (41)	5.1 (13)	0.7 (1.8)	0.0 (0.0)	0.0 (0.0)	0.0 (0.0)	0.0 (0.0)	2.7 (6.9)	8.2 (21)	23.3 (59)	95.7 (243)
Source: WRCC
