= Colonia Catriel Airport =

Airport in Argentina

Colonia Catriel Airport Aeropuerto de Colonia Catriel
- IATA: CCT; ICAO: none

Summary
- Airport type: Public
- Operator: Government
- Serves: Catriel, Río Negro Province, Argentina
- Elevation AMSL: 313 m / 1,027 ft
- Coordinates: 37°54′36″S 067°50′06″W

Map
- Location of the airport in Argentina

Runways
Direction	Length		Surface
Direction	m	ft	Surface
07/25	1,450	4,757	Concrete
- Source: GCM, STV.

Colonia Catriel Airport (IATA: CCT) (Spanish: Aeropuerto de Colonia Catriel) is an airport serving the city of Catriel in the Río Negro Province of Argentina.
