= Craig Cove Airport =

Airport in Vanuatu

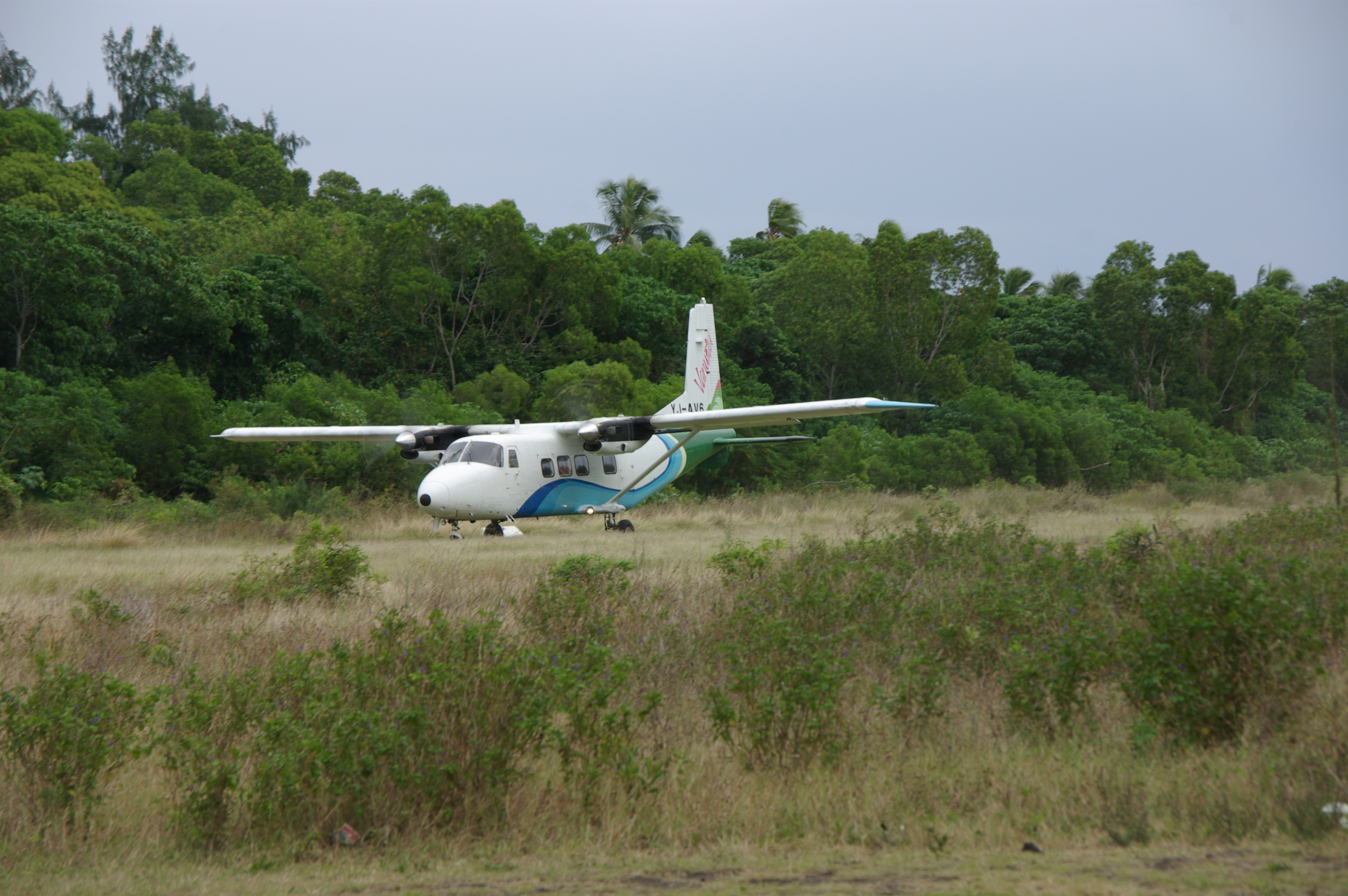
- Air Vanuatu Harbin Y-12 at Craig Cove Airport (2011)
- IATA: CCV; ICAO: NVSF

Summary
- Serves: Craig Cove, Ambrym Island, Malampa, Vanuatu
- Elevation AMSL: 69 ft (21 m)
- Coordinates: 16°15′54″S 167°55′28″E

Map
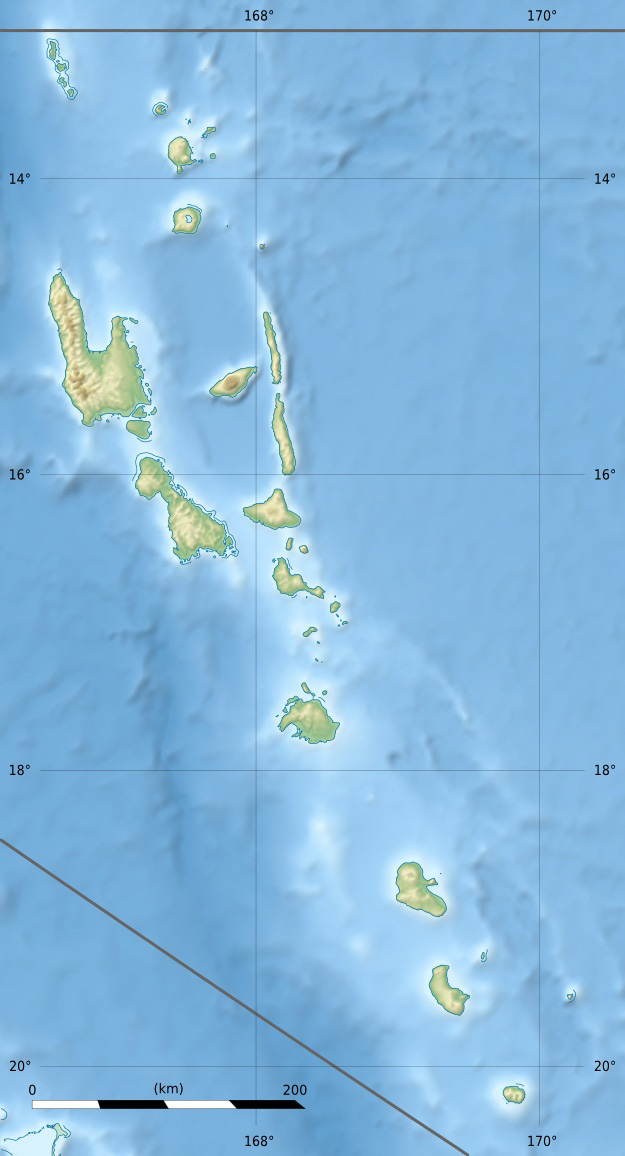
- Location of airport in Vanuatu

Helipads
Number	Length		Surface
Number	ft	m	Surface
	2,598	792
- Source: Great Circle Mapper

Craig Cove Airport is an airport in Craig Cove on Ambrym Island in Vanuatu (IATA: CCV, ICAO: NVSF).

== Airlines and destinations ==
Air Vanuatu connects Craig Cove Airport to Port Vila International Airport.
