= Camocim =

Municipality in Ceará, Brazil

- Municipality
- Municipality of Camocim
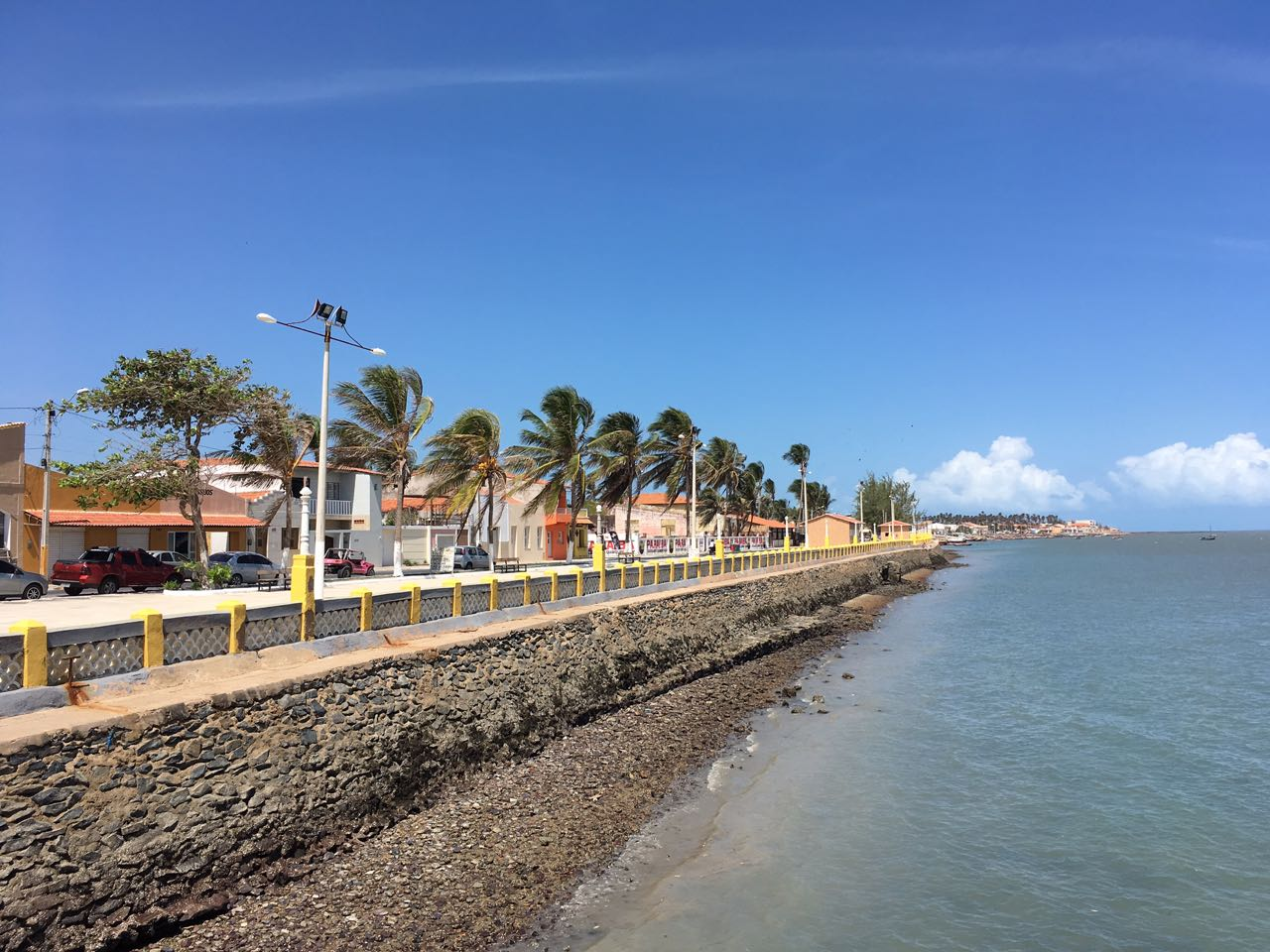
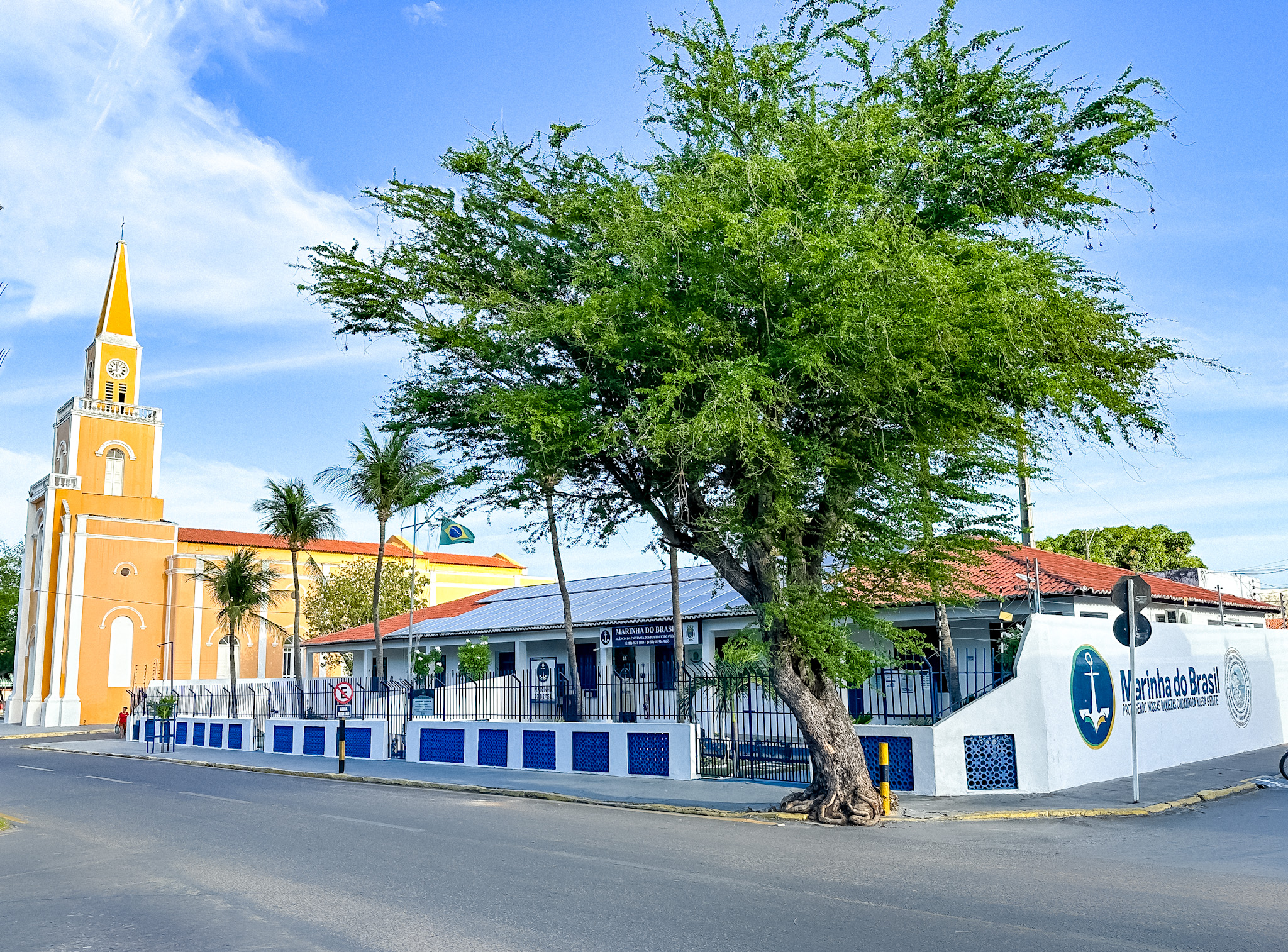
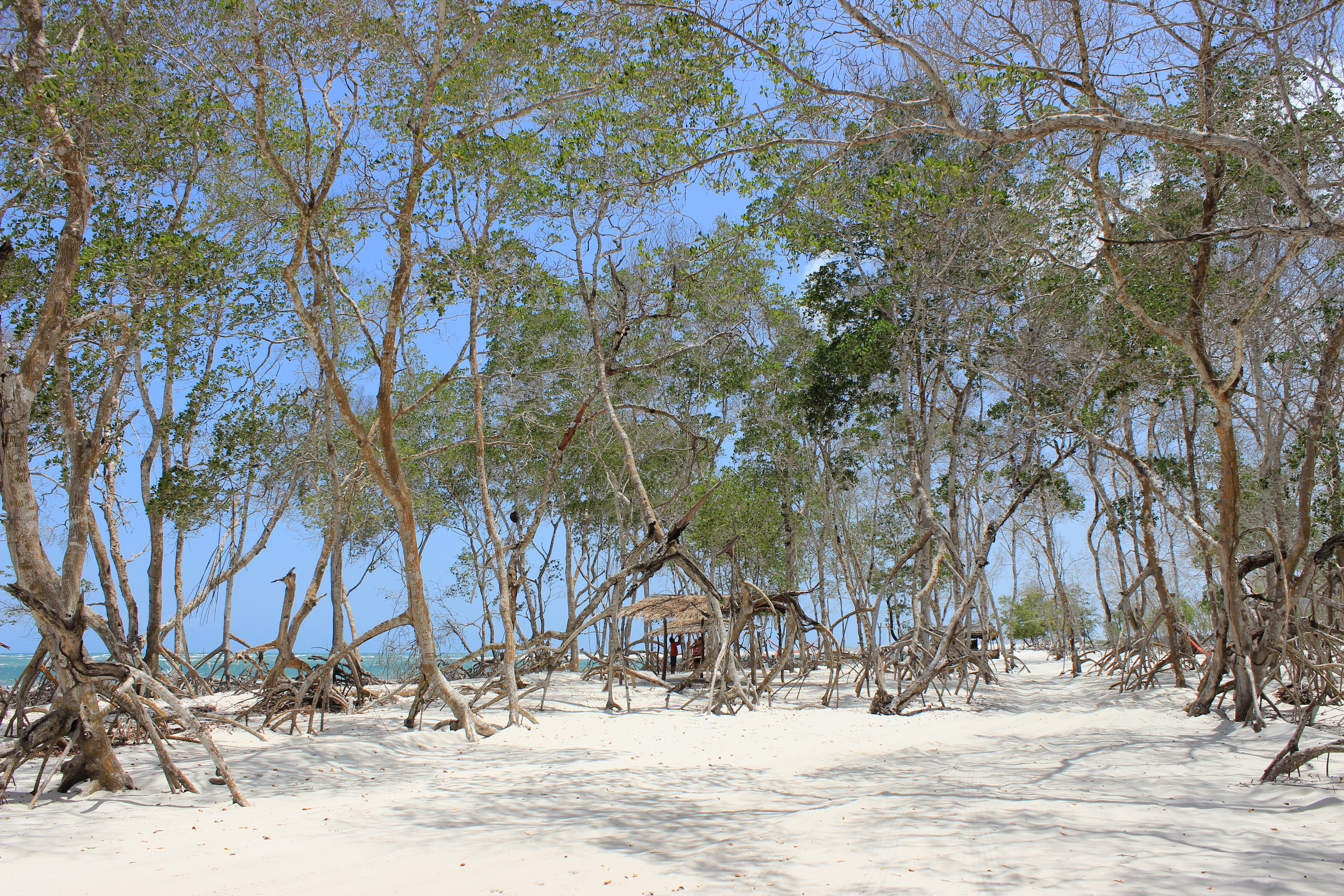
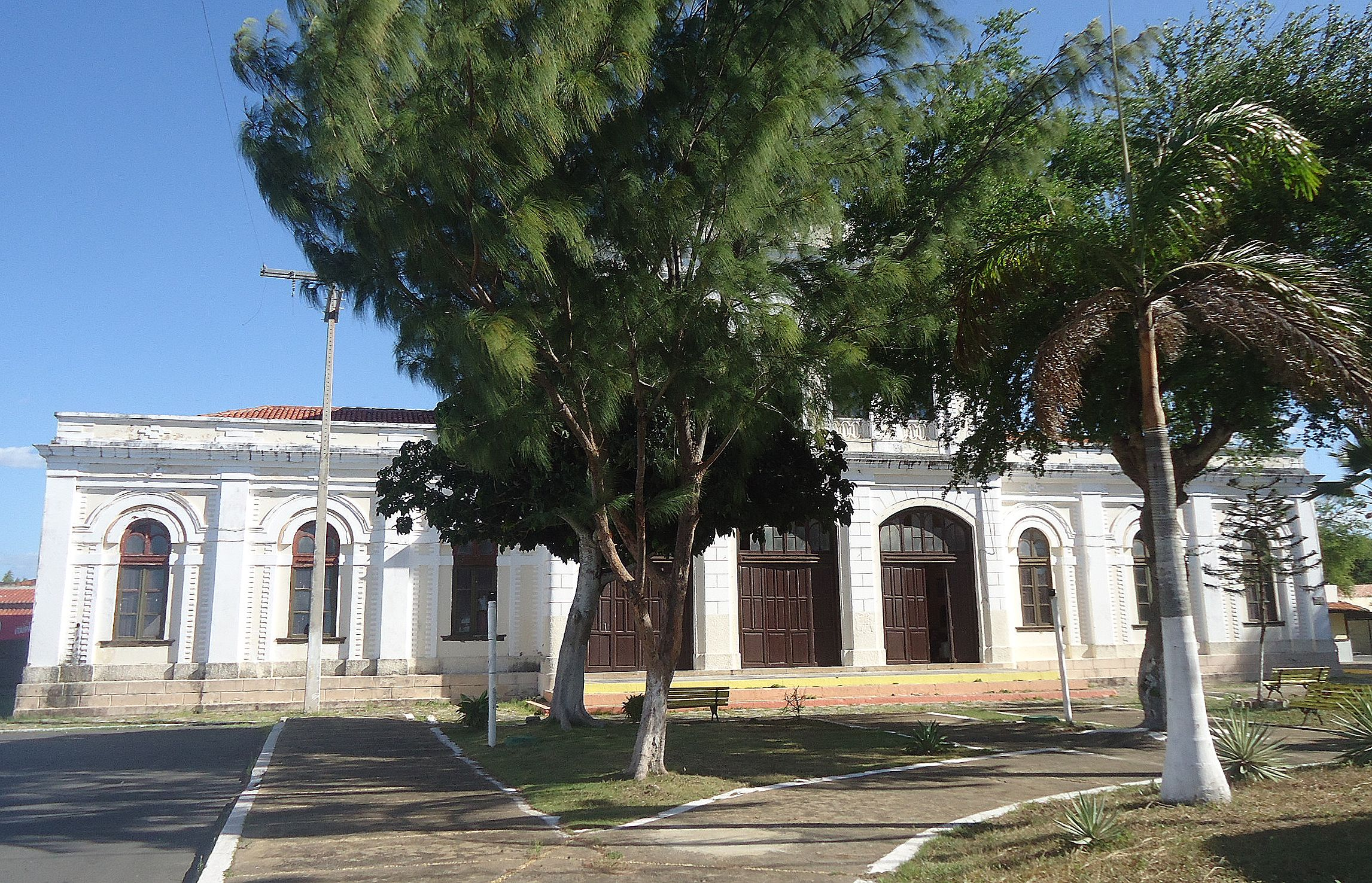
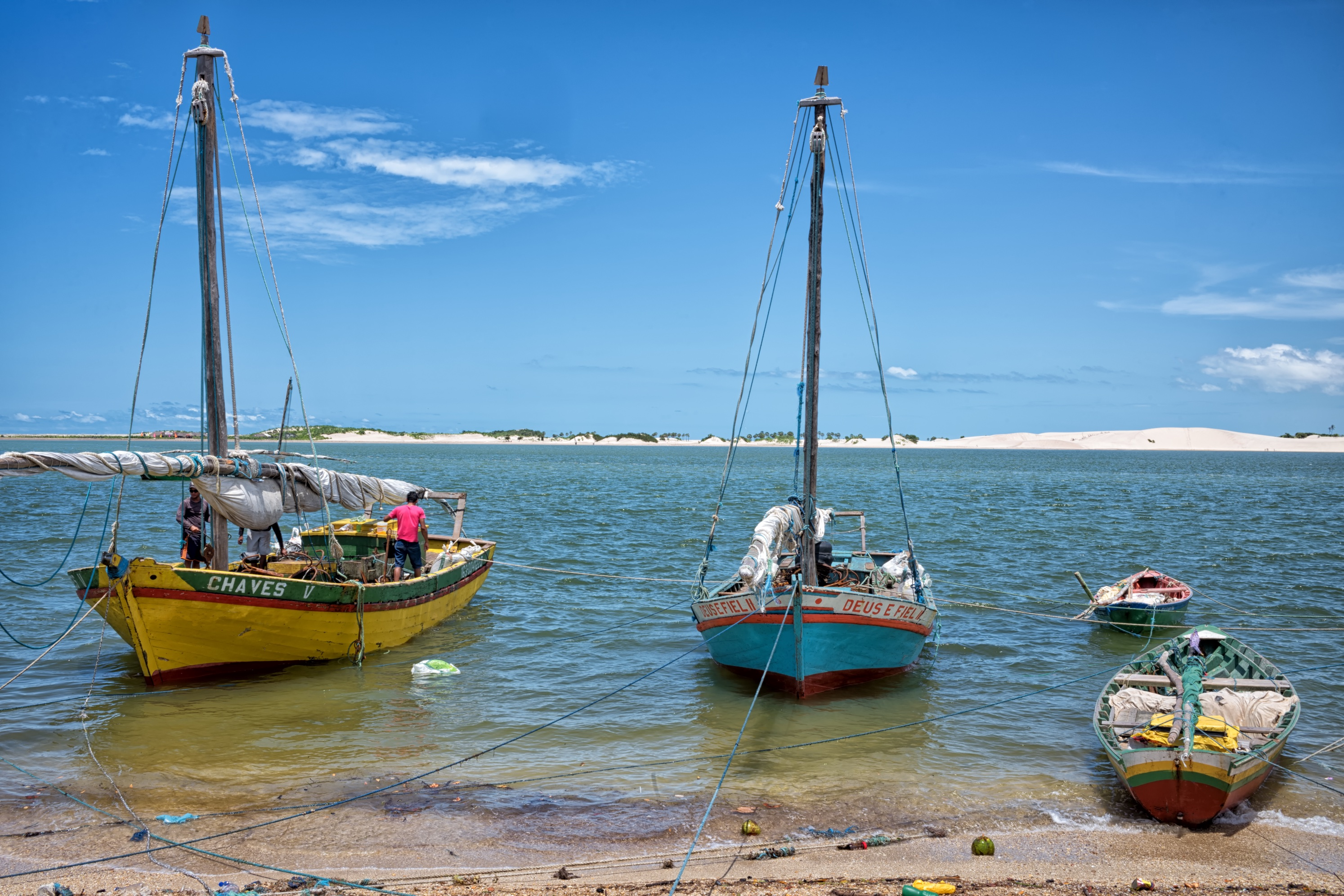
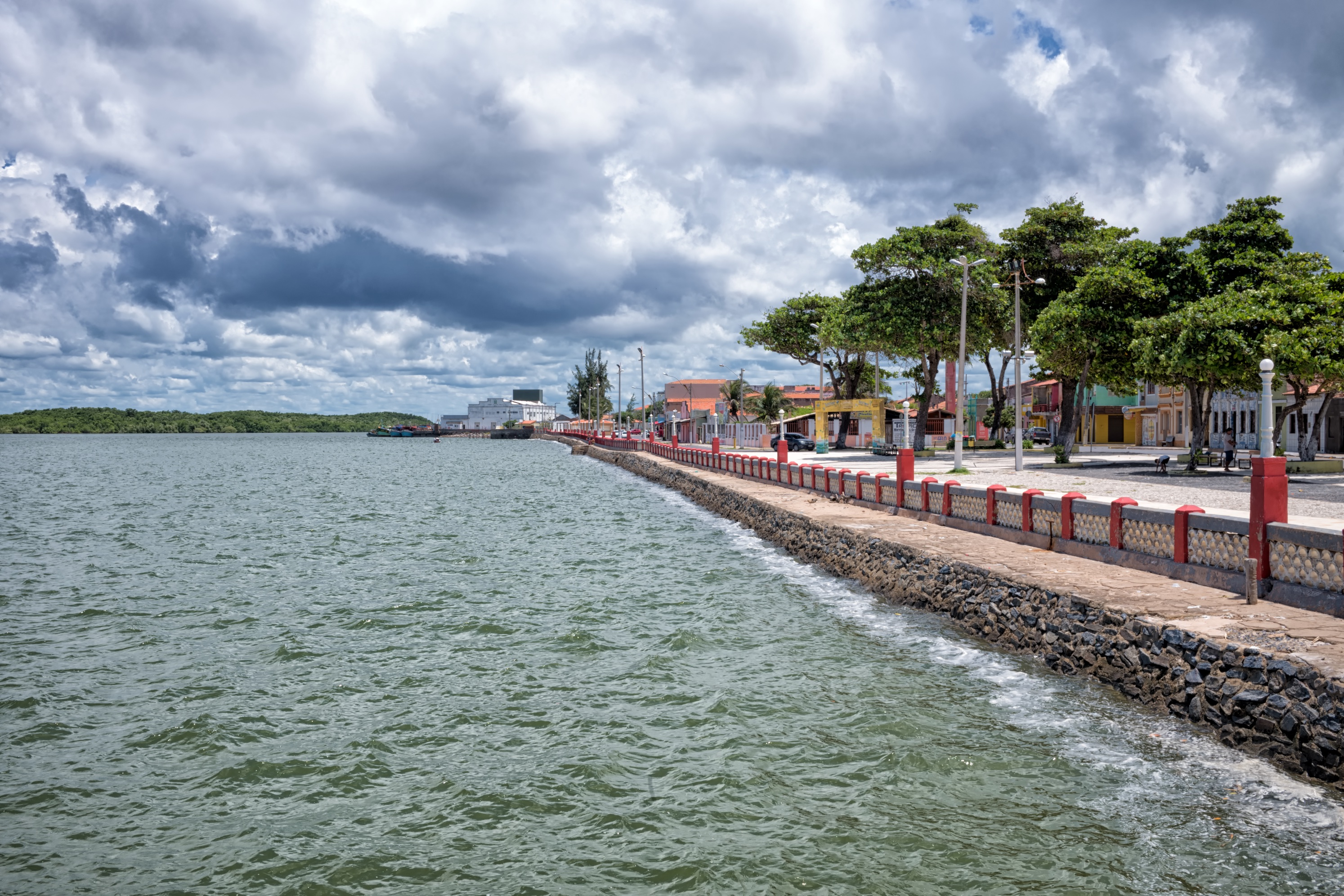

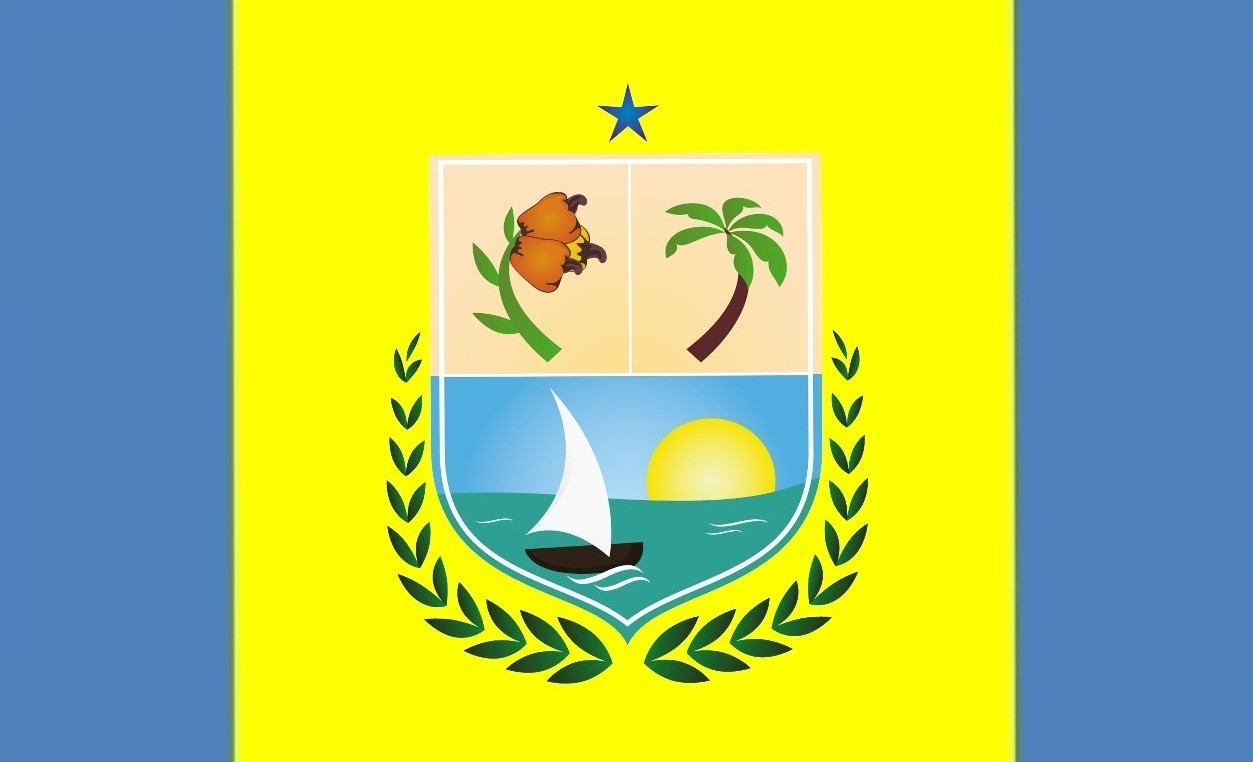
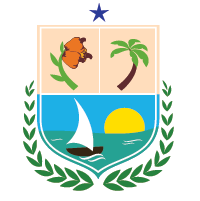
- Flag Coat of arms

- Location in Ceará
- Coordinates: 02°54′07″S 40°50′27″W
- Country: Brazil
- Region: Northeast
- State: Ceará
- Mesoregion: Noroeste Cearense
- Microregion: Litoral de Camocim e Acaraú
- Founded: September 29, 1879

Government
  - Mayor: Monica Gomes Aguiar (PDT)

Area
  - Total: 1,124.78 km^{2} (434.28 sq mi)
- Elevation: 8 m (26 ft)

Population (2020)
  - Total: 63,907
  - Density: 56.817/km^{2} (147.16/sq mi)
- Demonym: Portuguese: Camocinense
- Time zone: UTC−3 (BRT)
- Postal code: 62400-000
- Area code: 88
- HDI: 0,620
- Website: www.camocim.ce.gov.br

Camocim is a municipality in the state of Ceará, Brazil, founded in 1879. The population is 63,907 people (2020 estimate) in an area of 1,120.45 km^{2} (432.61 mi^{2}).

== Transportation ==
Camocim is served by Camocim Airport.
