= Circle Hot Springs Airport =

Airport in Alaska, U.S.

- IATA: CHP; ICAO: none; FAA LID: CHP

Summary
- Airport type: Public
- Owner: Alaska DOT&PF - Northern Region
- Serves: Circle Hot Springs, Alaska
- Elevation AMSL: 956 ft (291 m)
- Coordinates: 65°29′08″N 144°36′39″W

Map
- Location of airport in Alaska

Runways
Direction	Length		Surface
Direction	ft	m	Surface
9/27	3,669	1,118	Gravel

Statistics (2015)
- Aircraft operations: 3,600
- Based aircraft: 0
- Source: Federal Aviation Administration

Circle Hot Springs Airport (IATA: CHP, FAA LID: CHP) is a state-owned public-use airport serving Circle Hot Springs, in the Yukon-Koyukuk Census Area of the U.S. state of Alaska.

== Facilities and aircraft ==
Circle Hot Springs Airport covers an area of 37 acres (15 ha) at an elevation of 956 feet (291 m) above mean sea level. It has one runway designated 8/26 with a gravel surface measuring 3,650 by 80 feet (1,113 x 24 m). For the 12-month period ending December 31, 2005, the airport had 3,600 aircraft operations, an average of 300 per month: 72% general aviation and 28% air taxi.

== See also ==
- List of airports in Alaska
