= Yakataga Airport =

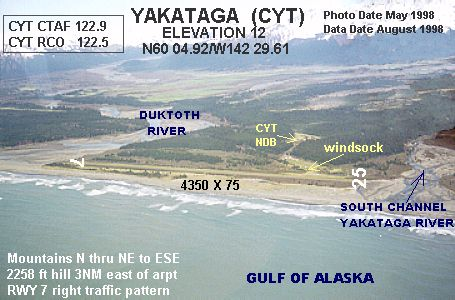
- IATA: CYT; ICAO: none; FAA LID: 0AA1

Summary
- Airport type: Public
- Owner: Federal Aviation Administration
- Serves: Yakataga, Alaska
- Elevation AMSL: 12 ft / 4 m
- Coordinates: 60°04′55″N 142°29′37″W

Map
- Location of airport in Alaska

Runways
| Direction | Length | | Surface |
| Direction | ft | m | Surface |
|---|---|---|---|
| 8/26 | 4,350 | 1,326 | Turf |

Statistics (2009)
- Aircraft operations: 350
- Source: Federal Aviation Administration

Yakataga Airport (IATA: CYT, FAA LID: 0AA1) is a public-use airport serving Yakataga (also known as Cape Yakataga) in the U.S. state of Alaska. It is owned by Federal Aviation Administration and lies in the western section of Yakutat Borough.

Scheduled passenger service to Yakutat Airport (via Alsek Air Service) ended in 2012, when the United States Department of Transportation suspended Essential Air Service subsidies.

== Facilities and aircraft ==
Yakataga Airport covers an area of 1,115 acres (451 ha) at an elevation of 12 feet (4 m) above mean sea level. It has one runway designated 8/26 with a turf surface measuring 4,350 by 75 feet (1,326 x 23 m).

For the 12-month period ending December 31, 2009, the airport had 350 aircraft operations, an average of 29 per month: 43% air taxi, 43% general aviation, and 14% military.

== See also ==
- List of airports in Alaska

== Other sources ==
- Essential Air Service documents (Docket DOT-OST-1996-2009) from the U.S. Department of Transportation:
  - Order 2002-12-26 (December 31, 2002): selecting Cordova Air Service, Inc., to provide subsidized essential air service at Cape Yakataga and Icy Bay, Alaska, at a subsidy rate of $40,619 a year (flying to/from Cordova).
  - Order 2004-9-24 (September 28, 2004): selecting Copper River Air Taxi to provide essential air service to Cape Yakataga and Icy Bay, Alaska, at a subsidy rate of $61,840 per year (flying to/from Cordova).
  - Order 2006-9-22 (September 22, 2006): selecting Alsek Air Service, Inc. to provide subsidized essential air service at Cape Yakataga and Icy Bay, Alaska, at an annual subsidy rate of $64,510 for the period of November 1, 2006, through October 31, 2008 (flying to/from Yakutat).
  - Order 2008-7-28 (July 25, 2008): selecting Alsek Air Service, Inc., to provide subsidized essential air service at Cape Yakataga and Icy Bay, Alaska, at an annual subsidy rate of $78,000 for the period of November 1, 2008, through October 31, 2010 (flying to/from Yakutat).
  - Order 2010-9-21 (September 17, 2010): re-selecting Alsek Air Service, Inc., to provide subsidized essential air service (EAS) at Cape Yakataga and Icy Bay, Alaska, at an annual subsidy rate of $91,000 for the period of November 1, 2010, through October 21, 2012. Three round trips each week to Cape Yakataga and Icy Bay from May through October (peak season) and round trips each week from November through April (off-peak season) on 4-seat or 5-seat Cessna.
  - Order 2012-12-3 (December 11, 2012): suspending the Essential Air Service (EAS) subsidy eligibility of Cape Yakataga, Alaska, and setting final subsidy rates for Alsek Air's provision of EAS at Cape Yakataga, for the period from November 1, 2012, through January 31, 2013, or until the carrier terminates service, whichever comes first (as per State of Alaska, no longer any permanent residents in Cape Yakataga).
