= List of airports in Arkansas =

This is a list of airports in Arkansas (a U.S. state), grouped by type and sorted by location. It contains all public-use and military airports in the state. Some private-use and former airports may be included where notable, such as airports that were previously public-use, those with commercial enplanements recorded by the FAA, or airports assigned an IATA airport code.

== Airports ==
This list contains the following information:

- **City served** – The city generally associated with the airport, as per the airport's master record with the Federal Aviation Administration. This is not always the actual location since some airports are located in smaller towns outside of the city they serve. It is not meant to be a complete list of cities served, which can be found in or added to each airport's Wikipedia article.
- **FAA** – The location identifier assigned by the Federal Aviation Administration (FAA). These are linked to each airport's page at the Arkansas Department of Aeronautics.
- **IATA** – The airport code assigned by the International Air Transport Association (IATA). Those that do not match the FAA code are shown in bold.
- **ICAO** – The location indicator assigned by the International Civil Aviation Organization (ICAO).
- **Airport name** – The official airport name. Those shown in **bold** indicate the airport has scheduled passenger service on commercial airlines.
- **Role** – One of four FAA airport categories, as per the 2023–2027 National Plan of Integrated Airport Systems (NPIAS) report released September 2022:
  - P-s: Commercial service – primary are publicly owned airports that receive scheduled passenger service and have more than 10,000 passenger boardings (enplanements) each year. Each primary airport is sub-classified by the FAA as one of the following four "hub" types (s):
    - L: Large hub that accounts for at least 1% of total U.S. passenger enplanements.
    - M: Medium hub that accounts for between 0.25% and 1% of total U.S. passenger enplanements.
    - S: Small hub that accounts for between 0.05% and 0.25% of total U.S. passenger enplanements.
    - N: Nonhub that accounts for less than 0.05% of total U.S. passenger enplanements, but more than 10,000 annual enplanements.
  - CS: Commercial service – nonprimary are publicly owned airports that receive scheduled passenger service and have at least 2,500 passenger boardings each year.
  - R: Reliever airports are designated by the FAA to relieve congestion at a large commercial service airport and to provide more general aviation access to the overall community.
  - GA: General aviation airports are the largest single group of airports in the U.S. airport system. They are public-use airports that do not have scheduled service or have scheduled service with less than 2,500 passenger boardings each year.
- **Enplanements** – The number of enplanements (commercial passenger boardings) that occurred at the airport in calendar year 2024, as per FAA records released 2025.

City served	FAA	IATA	ICAO	Airport name	Role	Enplanements (2024)
				**Commercial service – primary airports**		
Fayetteville	XNA	XNA	KXNA	**Northwest Arkansas National Airport**	P-S	1,123,106
Fort Smith	FSM	FSM	KFSM	**Fort Smith Regional Airport**	P-N	59,250
Little Rock	LIT	LIT	KLIT	**Bill and Hillary Clinton National Airport** (Adams Field) (was Little Rock National)	P-S	1,145,693
Texarkana	TXK	TXK	KTXK	**Texarkana Regional Airport** (Webb Field)	P-N	36,307
				**Commercial service – nonprimary airports**		
El Dorado	ELD	ELD	KELD	**South Arkansas Regional Airport** (Goodwin Field)	CS	2,560
Harrison	HRO	HRO	KHRO	**Boone County Airport**	CS	4,032
Hot Springs	HOT	HOT	KHOT	**Memorial Field Airport**	CS	3,303
Jonesboro	JBR	JBR	KJBR	**Jonesboro Municipal Airport**	CS	2,238
				**Reliever airports**		
North Little Rock	ORK		KORK	North Little Rock Municipal Airport	R	4
West Memphis	AWM	AWM	KAWM	West Memphis Municipal Airport	R	1
				**General aviation airports**		
Almyra	M73			Almyra Municipal Airport	GA	0
Arkadelphia	ADF		KADF	Dexter B. Florence Memorial Field	GA	0
Ash Flat	CVK		KCVK	Sharp County Regional Airport	GA	0
Augusta	M60			Woodruff County Airport	GA	0
Batesville	BVX	BVX	KBVX	Batesville Regional Airport	GA	5
Benton	SUZ		KSUZ	Saline County Regional Airport	GA	0
Bentonville	VBT		KVBT	Bentonville Municipal Airport (Louise M. Thaden Field)	GA	0
Berryville	4M1			Carroll County Airport	GA	0
Blytheville	BYH	BYH	KBYH	Arkansas International Airport (formerly Blytheville AFB)	GA	5
Blytheville	HKA	HKA	KHKA	Blytheville Municipal Airport	GA	0
Brinkley	M36			Frank Federer Memorial Airport	GA	0
Calico Rock	37T			Calico Rock - Izard County Airport	GA	0
Camden	CDH	CDH	KCDH	Harrell Field	GA	0
Carlisle	4M3			Carlisle Municipal Airport	GA	0
Clarendon	4M8			Clarendon Municipal Airport	GA	0
Clarksville	H35			Clarksville Municipal Airport	GA	0
Clinton	CCA		KCCA	Clinton Municipal Airport	GA	0
Colt	DRP		KDRP	Delta Regional Airport	GA	0
Conway	CXW		KCXW	Conway Airport at Cantrell Field	GA	0
Corning	4M9			Corning Municipal Airport	GA	0
Crossett	CRT	CRT	KCRT	Z. M. Jack Stell Field	GA	0
Danville	32A			Danville Municipal Airport	GA	0
De Queen	DEQ		KDEQ	J. Lynn Helms Sevier County Airport	GA	0
De Witt	5M1			De Witt Municipal Airport	GA	0
Dumas	0M0			Billy Free Municipal Airport	GA	0
Fayetteville	FYV	FYV	KFYV	Fayetteville Municipal Airport (Drake Field)	GA	295
Flippin	FLP		KFLP	Marion County Regional Airport	GA	0
Fordyce	5M4			Fordyce Municipal Airport (was H.L. Hopkins–Fordyce)	GA	0
Heber Springs	HBZ		KHBZ	Heber Springs Municipal Airport	GA	0
Helena-West Helena	HEE	HEE	KHEE	Thompson-Robbins Airport	GA	6
Hope	M18			Hope Municipal Airport	GA	0
Horseshoe Bend	6M2			Horseshoe Bend Airport (Arkansas)	GA	0
Lake Village	M32			Lake Village Municipal Airport	GA	0
Magnolia	AGO	AGO	KAGO	Magnolia Municipal Airport	GA	0
Malvern	M78			Malvern Municipal Airport	GA	0
Manila	MXA	MXA	KMXA	Manila Municipal Airport	GA	0
Marianna	6M7			Marianna/Lee County Airport (Steve Edwards Field)	GA	0
Marked Tree	6M8			Marked Tree Municipal Airport	GA	0
Marshall	4A5			Searcy County Airport	GA	0
McGehee	7M1	7M1		McGehee Municipal Airport	GA	0
Melbourne	42A			Melbourne Municipal Airport (John E. Miller Field)	GA	0
Mena	MEZ		KMEZ	Mena Intermountain Municipal Airport	GA	4
Monticello	LLQ		KLLQ	Monticello Municipal Airport (Ellis Field)	GA	0
Morrilton	BDQ		KBDQ	Morrilton Municipal Airport	GA	0
Morrilton	MPJ	MPJ	KMPJ	Petit Jean Park Airport	GA	0
Mount Ida	7M3			Bearce Airport	GA	0
Mountain Home	BPK	WMH	KBPK	Ozark Regional Airport (Baxter County Airport)	GA	8
Nashville	M77			Howard County Airport	GA	0
Newport	M19			Newport Municipal Airport	GA	0
Osceola	7M4			Osceola Municipal Airport	GA	0
Ozark	7M5			Ozark - Franklin County Airport	GA	0
Paragould	PGR		KPGR	Kirk Field	GA	4
Paris / Subiaco	7M6			Paris Municipal Airport	GA	0
Piggott	7M7			Piggott Municipal Airport	GA	0
Pine Bluff	PBF	PBF	KPBF	Grider Field	GA	0
Pocahontas	M70			Pocahontas Municipal Airport (Nick Wilson Field)	GA	0
Rogers	ROG	ROG	KROG	Rogers Municipal Airport (Carter Field)	GA	75
Russellville	RUE		KRUE	Russellville Regional Airport (was Russellville Municipal)	GA	0
Searcy	SRC	SRC	KSRC	Searcy Municipal Airport	GA	0
Sheridan	9M8			Sheridan Municipal Airport	GA	0
Siloam Springs	SLG	SLG	KSLG	Smith Field	GA	8
Springdale	ASG	SPZ	KASG	Springdale Municipal Airport	GA	0
Stuttgart	SGT	SGT	KSGT	Stuttgart Municipal Airport	GA	0
Waldron	M27			Waldron Municipal Airport	GA	0
Walnut Ridge	ARG	ARG	KARG	Walnut Ridge Regional Airport	GA	0
Warren	3M9			Warren Municipal Airport	GA	0
				**Other public-use airports** (not listed in NPIAS)		
Bald Knob	M74			Bald Knob Municipal Airport		
Booneville	4M2			Booneville Municipal Airport		
Clinton	2A2			Holley Mountain Airpark		
Decatur	5M5			Crystal Lake Airport		
Dermott	4M5			Dermott Municipal Airport		
El Dorado	F43			El Dorado Downtown Airport (Stevens Field)		
Forrest City	FCY			Forrest City Municipal Airport		
Greenbrier	12A			Arkavalley Airport		
Gurdon	5M8			Gurdon Airport (Lowe Field)		
Hampton	0R6			Hampton Municipal Airport		
Hazen	6M0			Hazen Municipal Airport		
Holly Grove	2A6			Holly Grove Municipal Airport		
Huntsville	H34			Huntsville Municipal Airport		
Lakeview	3M0			Gaston's Airport		
McCrory	7M0			McCrory/Morton Airport		
Mountain View	7M2			Mountain View Airport (Harry E. Wilcox Memorial Field)		
Prescott	4F7			Kizer Field		
Rector	7M8			Rector Airport		
Salem	7M9			Salem Airport		
Sherrill	99A			Smith's International Airport		
Star City	55M			Star City Municipal Airport		
Stephens	4F8			Wilson Airport		
Weiner	8M2			Sally Wofford Airport		
Wynne	M65			Wynne Municipal Airport		
				**Other military airports**		
Robinson Maneuver Training Center / Little Rock	RBM		KRBM	Robinson Army Airfield		
Fort Chaffee	AZU		KAZU	Arrowhead Assault Strip		
Jacksonville / Little Rock	LRF	LRF	KLRF	Little Rock Air Force Base		559
				**Future airports**		
Colt				Delta Regional Airport (under construction)		
				**Notable former airports**		
Benton	~~M99~~			Saline County Airport (Watts Field) (closed)	~~GA~~	
Conway	~~CWS~~		~~KCWS~~	Dennis F. Cantrell Field	~~GA~~	
Eureka Springs	~~5A5~~			Silver Wings Field (closed)		
Garfield	~~40AR~~			Lost Bridge Village Airport (re-opened private airstrip, asphalt surface in good condition)		

== See also ==
- Arkansas World War II Army Airfields
- Essential Air Service
- Wikipedia:WikiProject Aviation/Airline destination lists: North America#Arkansas
