= Crystal Airport =

Crystal Airport may refer to:

- Crystal Airport (Minnesota) in Crystal, Minnesota (suburb of Minneapolis), United States (FAA: MIC)
- Crystal Airport (California) in Llano, California, United States (FAA: 46CN)

Other airport names starting with Crystal

- Crystal City Municipal Airport in Crystal City, Texas, United States (FAA: 20R)
- Crystal Lake Airport in Decatur, Arkansas, United States (FAA: 5M5)
- Crystal River Airport in Crystal River, Florida, United States (FAA: CGC)
