= Booneville Airport =

Booneville Airport may refer to:

- Booneville Municipal Airport in Booneville, Arkansas, United States (FAA: 4M2)
- Booneville/Baldwyn Airport in Booneville/Baldwyn, Mississippi, United States (FAA: 8M1)

== See also ==
- Boonville Airport (disambiguation)
