= MPJ =

MPJ or mpj may refer to:

- Michael Porter Jr. (born 1998), American basketball player
- Michael Pittman Jr. (born 1997), American football player
- Michael Penix Jr. (born 2000), American football player
- MPJ, the IATA and FAA LID code for Petit Jean Park Airport, Arkansas, United States
- MPJ, the Indian Railways station code for Madanpur railway station, West Bengal, India
- MPJ, the NYSE symbol for Mississippi Power, an American investor-owned electric utility
- mpj, the ISO 639-3 code for Martu Wangka dialect, Western Australia
