= Florence Airport (disambiguation) =

Florence Airport is a public use airport in Florence, Italy (IATA/ICAO: FLR/LIRQ).

Florence Airport may also refer to:

- Dexter B. Florence Memorial Field, a public use airport in Arkadelphia, Arkansas, United States (FAA: M89)
- Florence Municipal Airport, a public use airport in Florence, Oregon, United States (FAA: 6S2)
- Florence Regional Airport, a public use airport in Florence, South Carolina, United States (FAA/IATA: FLO)
