= Carlisle Airport =

Carlisle Airport may refer to:

- Carlisle Lake District Airport in Carlisle, Cumbria, England
- Carlisle Municipal Airport in Lonoke County, Arkansas, United States
- Carlisle Airport (Pennsylvania) in Pennsylvania, United States
