= Hazen Airport =

Hazen Airport may refer to:

- Hazen Municipal Airport in Hazen, Arkansas, United States (FAA: 6M0)
- Mercer County Regional Airport (formerly Hazen Municipal Airport) in Hazen, North Dakota, United States (FAA/IATA: HZE)
