= Boonville Airport =

Boonville Airport may refer to:

- Boonville Airport (California) in Boonville, California, United States (FAA: D83)
- Boonville Airport (Indiana) in Boonville, Indiana, United States (FAA: I91)

== See also ==
- Booneville Airport (disambiguation)

e
