= D83 =

D83 may refer to:

- Boonville Airport (California)
- HMS Broke (D83)
- Greek destroyer Spetsai (D83)
- Grünfeld Defence, Encyclopaedia of Chess Openings code
