= Stuttgart Army Airfield =

Stuttgart Army Airfield is the name of two US Army installations:

- for the World War II base see Stuttgart Army Airfield (Arkansas)
- for the current base see Stuttgart Army Airfield (Germany)
