= North Little Rock Municipal Airport =

Airport in Arkansas, United States

- IATA: none; ICAO: KORK; FAA LID: ORK

Summary
- Airport type: Public
- Owner: City of North Little Rock
- Serves: North Little Rock, Arkansas
- Elevation AMSL: 545 ft (166 m)
- Coordinates: 34°49′59″N 092°15′15″W
- Website: nlr.ar.gov

Map
- Location of airport in Arkansas / United States ORK (the United States)

Runways
Direction	Length		Surface
Direction	ft	m	Surface
5/23	5,002	1,525	Concrete
17/35	3,019	920	Asphalt

Statistics (2021)
- Aircraft operations (year ending 5/30/2021): 32,200
- Based aircraft: 61
- Source: Federal Aviation Administration

North Little Rock Municipal Airport (ICAO: KORK, FAA LID: ORK, formerly 1M1) is a public use airport in Pulaski County, Arkansas, United States. It is owned by the City of North Little Rock and located four nautical miles (5 mi, 7 km) north of its central business district.

This airport is included in the FAA's National Plan of Integrated Airport Systems for 2011–2015, which categorized it as a general aviation reliever airport for Little Rock National Airport.

Although many U.S. airports use the same three-letter location identifier for the FAA and IATA, this airport is assigned ORK by the FAA but has no designation from the IATA (which assigned ORK to Cork Airport in Cork, Ireland).

== Facilities and aircraft ==
North Little Rock Municipal Airport covers an area of 621 acres (251 ha) at an elevation of 545 feet (166 m) above mean sea level. It has two runways: 5/23 is 5,002 by 75 feet (1,525 x 23 m) with a concrete surface and 17/35 is 3,019 by 75 feet (920 x 23 m) with an asphalt surface.

For the 12-month period ending May 30, 2021, the airport had 32,200 aircraft operations, an average of 88 per day: 97% general aviation, 3% air taxi, and <1% military. At that time there were 61 aircraft based at this airport: 50 single-engine, 4 multi-engine, 3 jet, and 4 helicopter.

The airport's fixed-base operators (FBOs) are Barrett Aviation and Air Charter Express.

== See also ==
- List of airports in Arkansas
