= Batesville Regional Airport =

Airport in Arkansas, United States

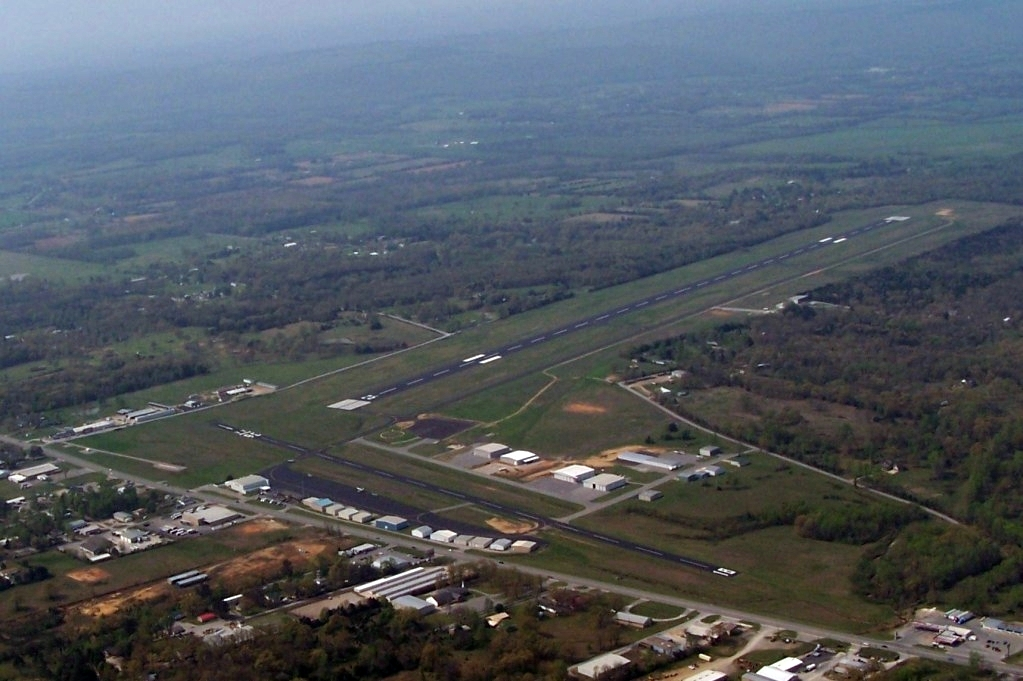
- IATA: BVX; ICAO: KBVX; FAA LID: BVX

Summary
- Airport type: Public
- Owner: City of Batesville
- Serves: Batesville, Arkansas
- Elevation AMSL: 465 ft (142 m)
- Coordinates: 35°43′34″N 091°38′51″W
- Website: BatesvilleRegionalAirport.com

Map
- Location of airport in Arkansas BVX (the United States)

Runways
Direction	Length		Surface
Direction	ft	m	Surface
8/26	6,002	1,829	Asphalt
18/36	2,804	855	Asphalt

Statistics (2008)
- Aircraft operations: 35,000
- Based aircraft: 53
- Source: Federal Aviation Administration

Batesville Regional Airport (IATA: BVX, ICAO: KBVX, FAA LID: BVX) is a public-use airport located three nautical miles (4 mi, 6 km) south of the central business district of Batesville, in Independence County, Arkansas, United States. It is owned by the City of Batesville.

This airport is included in the FAA's National Plan of Integrated Airport Systems for 2011–2015, which categorized it as a general aviation airport.

== Facilities and aircraft ==
Batesville Regional Airport covers an area of 398 acres (161 ha) at an elevation of 465 feet (142 m) above mean sea level. It has two asphalt paved runways: 8/26 is 6,002 by 150 feet (1,829 x 46 m) and 18/36 is 2,804 by 60 feet (855 x 18 m).

For the 12-month period ending May 31, 2008, the airport had 35,000 aircraft operations, an average of 95 per day: 86% general aviation, 9% air taxi, and 6% military. At that time there were 53 aircraft based at this airport: 77% single-engine, 21% multi-engine and 2% jet.

== Accidents and incidents ==
On November 29, 2022, a Learjet 45 (N988MC) overran the end of runway 8 (1829 meters long) by 370 meters crossing runway 36 and two fields ending up next to U.S. Highway 167, sustaining substantial damage but no apparent injuries to the two crew members or the five passengers onboard the aircraft.

== See also ==
- List of airports in Arkansas
