= Paris Municipal Airport =

Airport in Arkansas, United States

- IATA: none; ICAO: none; FAA LID: 7M6

Summary
- Airport type: Public
- Owner: City of Paris
- Serves: Paris / Subiaco, Arkansas
- Elevation AMSL: 430 ft (130 m)
- Coordinates: 35°17′56″N 093°40′54″W

Map
- Location of airport in Arkansas 7M6 (the United States)

Runways
Direction	Length		Surface
Direction	ft	m	Surface
3/21	2,700	823	Asphalt

Statistics (2011)
- Aircraft operations: 3,300
- Based aircraft: 4
- Source: Federal Aviation Administration

Paris Municipal Airport (FAA LID: 7M6) is an airport in Logan County, Arkansas, United States. It is owned by the city of Paris, Arkansas and located two nautical miles (4 km) east of its central business district. The airport is also west of Subiaco, Arkansas. It is included in the National Plan of Integrated Airport Systems for 2011–2015, which categorized it as a general aviation facility.

== Facilities and aircraft ==
Paris Municipal Airport covers an area of 70 acres (28 ha) at an elevation of 430 feet (131 m) above mean sea level. It has one runway designated 3/21 with an asphalt surface measuring 2,700 by 60 feet (823 x 18 m).

For the 12-month period ending June 30, 2011, the airport had 3,300 general aviation aircraft operations, an average of 275 per month. At that time there were four aircraft based at this airport: 75% single-engine and 25% helicopter.

An Air Evac Lifeteam base is located here, providing air ambulance services to the surrounding region.

== See also ==
- List of airports in Arkansas
