= Conway Municipal Airport =

Airport in Faulkner County, Arkansas, United States

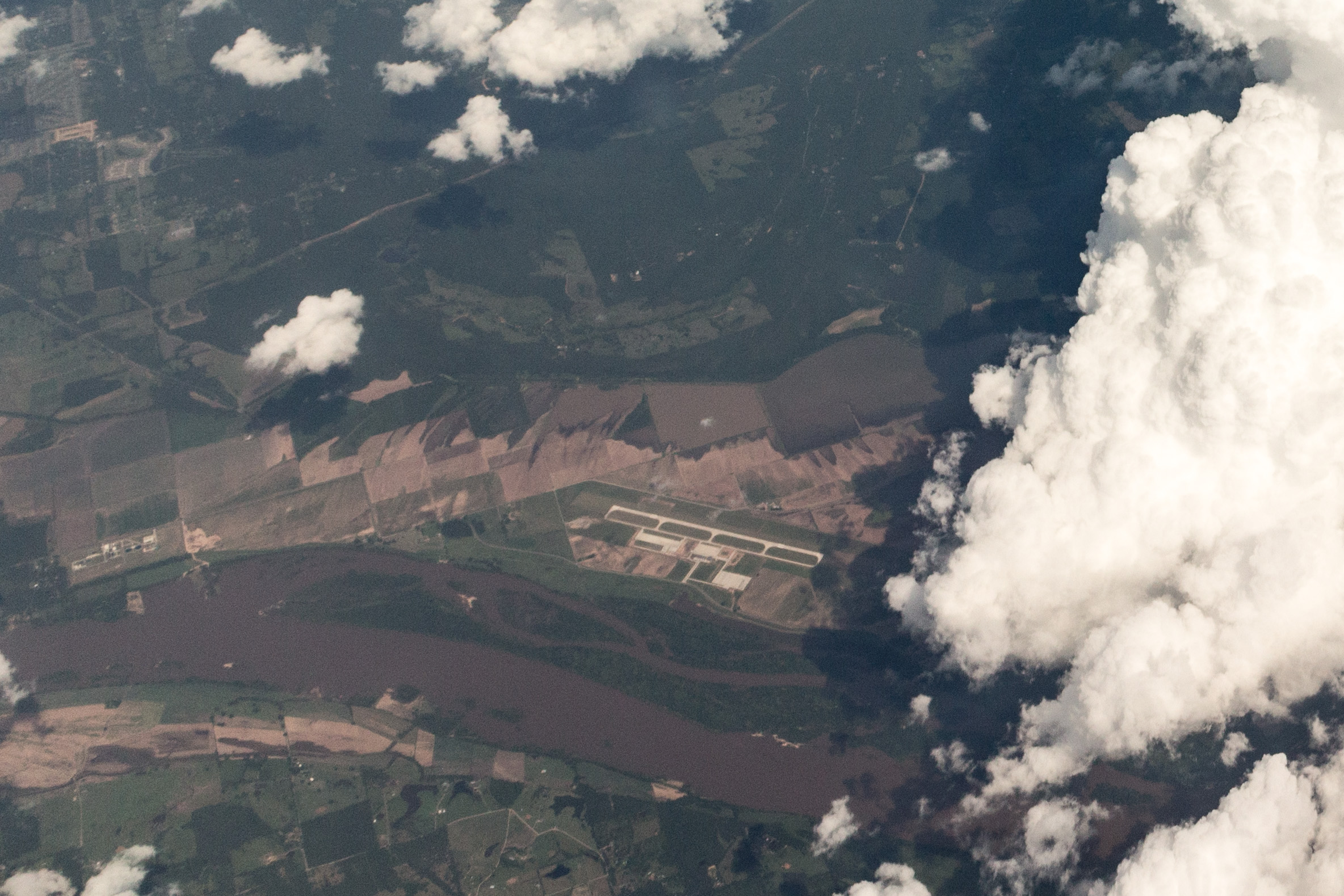
- IATA: none; ICAO: KCXW; FAA LID: CXW

Summary
- Airport type: Public
- Owner: City of Conway
- Serves: Conway, Arkansas
- Elevation AMSL: 276.1 ft (84.2 m)
- Coordinates: 35°01′11″N 092°33′18″W

Map
- Location of airport in Arkansas CXW (the United States)

Runways
Direction	Length		Surface
Direction	ft	m	Surface
4/22	5,500	1,676	concrete

Statistics
- Aircraft operations: n/a
- Based aircraft: n/a
- Source: Federal Aviation Administration

Conway Municipal Airport (ICAO: KCXW, FAA LID: CXW) is a public use airport located 10 miles southwest of Conway, at Cantrell Field in Faulkner County, Arkansas, United States, owned by the City of Conway.

The new airport opened in September 2014 as a replacement for the old Dennis F. Cantrell Field airport in the center of Conway.

== Facilities and aircraft ==
Conway Municipal Airport covers an area of 431 acres (174 hectares) at an elevation of 276 ft (84 m) AMSL (above mean sea level). It has one concrete paved runway: 4/22 which is 5,500 ft (1,700 m) long by 100 ft (30 m) wide, with a full-length parallel taxiway. All airfield lighting is provided by state-of-the-art LEDs, and the airport is served by GPS WAAS/LPV approaches to both runways.

== See also ==
- List of airports in Arkansas
