= Alfred Surratt =

American baseball player

- Outfielder
- Born: November 9, 1922; Danville, Arkansas
- Died: February 15, 2010 (aged 87); Kansas City, Missouri

Negro league baseball debut
- 1947, for the Detroit Stars

Last appearance
- 1952, for the Kansas City Monarchs

Teams
- Detroit Stars (1947–49); Kansas City Monarchs (1949–52)

Alfred G. "Slick" Surratt (November 9, 1922 – February 15, 2010) was an American baseball outfielder in the Kansas City Monarchs, a Negro league baseball franchise based in Kansas City, Missouri, from 1947 until 1952. Surratt later co-founded the Negro Leagues Baseball Museum in Kansas City in 1990.

Surratt was born in Danville, Arkansas. He moved to Kansas City, Missouri, after eighth grade to live with his father. He served in the United States Army during World War II, receiving an honorable discharge in 1946.

In 1947, Surratt joined the Detroit Stars, another Negro league team. He soon moved back to Kansas City in 1947, where he was a reserve outfielder for the Kansas City Monarchs until his retirement from the league in 1952.

Surratt began working at the Ford Motor Company's assembly plant in Claycomo, Missouri that same year. He continued to work for Ford at Claycomo for the next 51 years.

Surratt was an original founding member of the Negro Leagues Baseball Museum, which opened in Kansas City in 1990. He also served on the museum's board of directors. Starting in the early 1990s, he became known as a raconteur of the Negro leagues.

Surratt died at a nursing home in Kansas City on February 15, 2010, at the age of 87. He was survived by his wife, Tommie, and son, Alfred Surratt Jr.
