= Danville Municipal Airport =

Airport in Arkansas, United States

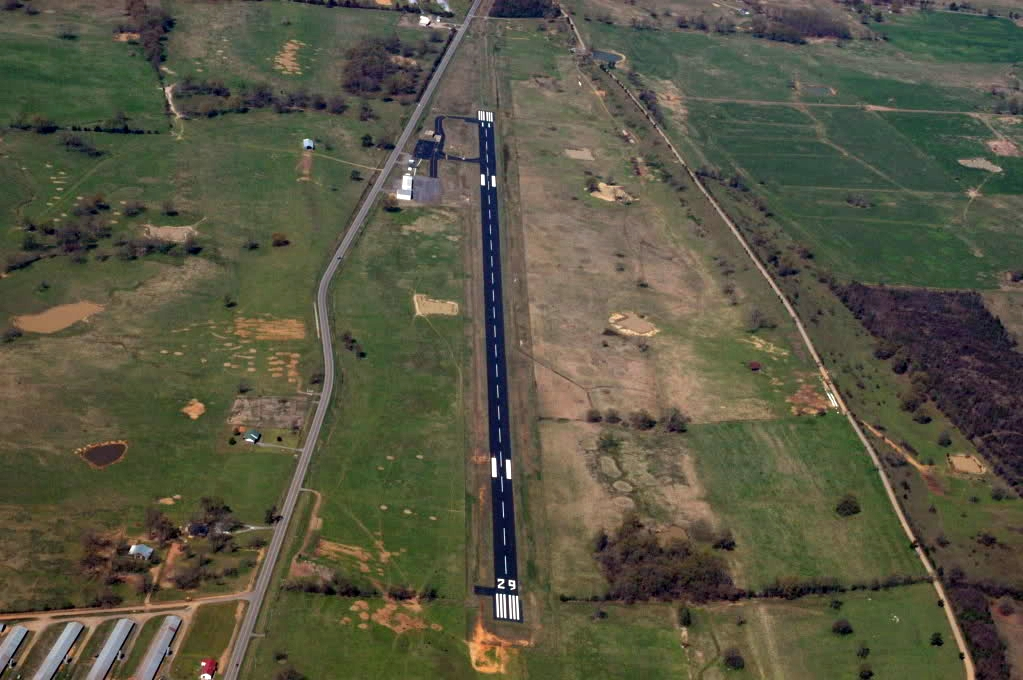
- IATA: none; ICAO: none; FAA LID: 32A

Summary
- Airport type: Public
- Owner: City of Danville
- Serves: Danville, Arkansas
- Elevation AMSL: 387 ft (118 m)
- Coordinates: 35°05′13″N 093°25′39″W

Map
- Location of airport in Arkansas 32A (the United States)

Runways
Direction	Length		Surface
Direction	ft	m	Surface
11/29	5,325	1,623	Asphalt

Statistics (2011)
- Aircraft operations: 3,000
- Based aircraft: 7
- Source: Federal Aviation Administration

Danville Municipal Airport (FAA LID: 32A) is a public use airport in Yell County, Arkansas, United States. The airport is owned by the City of Danville and located three nautical miles (6 km) northwest of its central business district. It is included in the National Plan of Integrated Airport Systems for 2011–2015, which categorized it as a general aviation facility.

== Facilities and aircraft ==
Danville Municipal Airport covers an area of 49 acres (20 ha) at an elevation of 387 feet (118 m) above mean sea level. It has one runway designated 11/29 with an asphalt surface measuring 5,325 by 75 feet (1,623 x 23 m).

For the 12-month period ending June 30, 2011, the airport had 3,000 general aviation aircraft operations, an average of 58 per week. At that time there were seven aircraft based at this airport: 57% single-engine and 43% multi-engine.

Since 1987, Danville Municipal Airport has received $1,482,659.85 in grant funding for improvements.

== See also ==
- List of airports in Arkansas
