= Osceola Municipal Airport (Arkansas) =

Airport in Arkansas, United States

- IATA: none; ICAO: none; FAA LID: 7M4

Summary
- Airport type: Public
- Owner: City of Osceola
- Serves: Osceola, Arkansas
- Elevation AMSL: 234 ft (71 m)
- Coordinates: 35°41′28″N 090°00′36″W

Map
- Location of airport in Arkansas 7M4 (the United States)

Runways
Direction	Length		Surface
Direction	ft	m	Surface
1/19	3,800	1,158	Asphalt

Statistics (2012)
- Aircraft operations: 9,100
- Based aircraft: 8
- Source: Federal Aviation Administration

Osceola Municipal Airport (FAA LID: 7M4) is a city-owned, public-use airport located two nautical miles (4 km) southwest of the central business district of Osceola, a city in Mississippi County, Arkansas, United States. It is included in the National Plan of Integrated Airport Systems for 2011–2015, which categorized it as a general aviation facility.

== Facilities and aircraft ==
Osceola Municipal Airport covers an area of 110 acres (45 ha) at an elevation of 234 feet (71 m) above mean sea level. It has one runway designated 1/19 with an asphalt surface measuring 3,800 by 75 feet (1,158 x 23 m).

For the 12-month period ending June 30, 2012, the airport had 9,100 aircraft operations, an average of 24 per day: 99% general aviation and 1% air taxi. At that time there were eight single-engine aircraft based at this airport.

== See also ==
- List of airports in Arkansas
