= Lloyd R. George =

American politician

Lloyd Reid George (October 23, 1925 – February 25, 2012) was an American politician.

George was a mayor of Danville, Arkansas and then served in the Arkansas House of Representatives 1963-1967 and 1973–1997. A son, Nathan V. George, was also a state representative.

George was well known for wearing overalls on the last day of the legislative session to mark his return from the legislature to his farm.
