= Almyra Municipal Airport =

Airport in Arkansas, United States

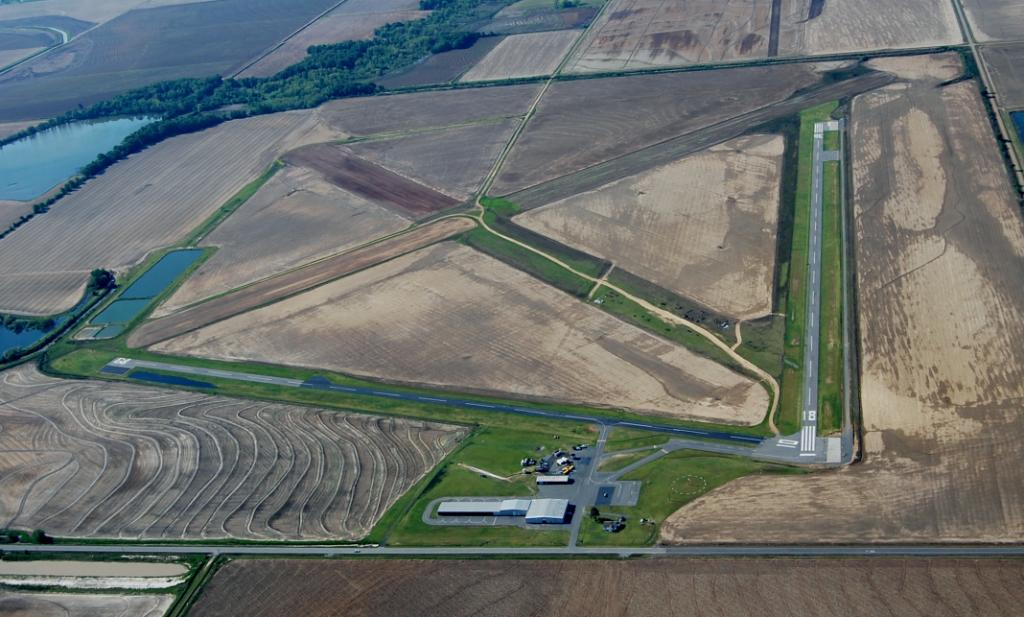
- IATA: none; ICAO: none; FAA LID: M73

Summary
- Airport type: Public
- Owner: City of Almyra
- Serves: Almyra, Arkansas
- Elevation AMSL: 211 ft (64 m)
- Coordinates: 34°24′44″N 091°27′59″W
- Interactive map of Almyra Municipal Airport

Runways
Direction	Length		Surface
Direction	ft	m	Surface
18/36	3,494	1,065	Asphalt
10/28	3,000	914	Asphalt

Statistics (2022)
- Aircraft operations: 54,100
- Based aircraft: 11
- Source: Federal Aviation Administration

Almyra Municipal Airport (FAA LID: M73) is a city-owned, public-use airport located three nautical miles (6 km) west of the central business district of Almyra, a city in Arkansas County, Arkansas, United States. This airport is included in the FAA's National Plan of Integrated Airport Systems for 2009–2013, which categorizes it as a general aviation facility.

== Facilities and aircraft ==
Almyra Municipal Airport covers an area of 640 acres (260 ha) at an elevation of 211 feet (64 m) above mean sea level. It has two asphalt paved runways: 18/36 is 3,494 by 60 feet (1,065 x 18 m) and 10/28 is 3,000 by 50 feet (914 x 15 m). For the 12-month period ending December 31, 2022, the airport had 54,100 aircraft operations, an average of 148 per day: 99% general aviation and <1% military.

== History ==
The airport was built by the United States Army Air Forces during 1942/43 as an axillary airfield for Stuttgart Army Airfield, near Stuttgart, Arkansas. It was known simply as Stuttgart Army Airfield Auxiliary #5. The runways in use today were built during that period. It was used to help train medium bomber and transport pilots, who used it for emergencies on it or practiced touch-and-go landings. It was not staffed, and at the end of World War II it was simply abandoned and the land turned over to local authorities, like many other small auxiliary airfields.

The City of Almyra developed the current airport from the former military airfield. Some of the old wartime runways and taxiways still can be seen, which have not been used since the war ended.

== See also ==
- List of airports in Arkansas
