= Saline County Regional Airport =

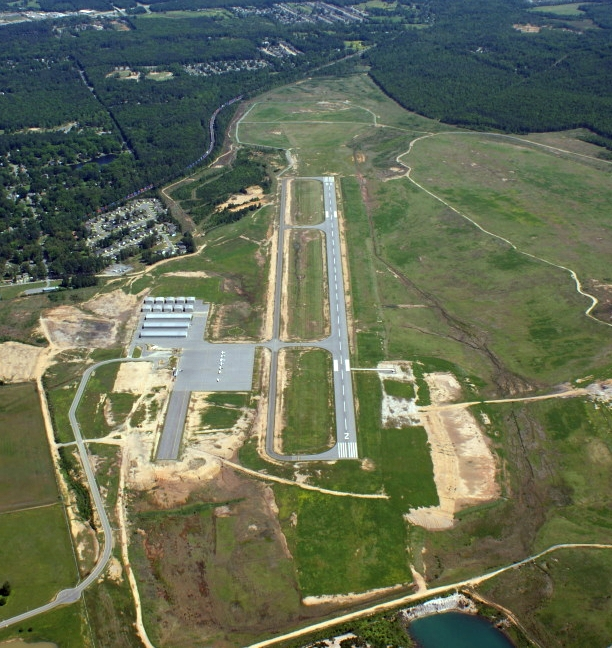
- IATA: none; ICAO: KSUZ; FAA LID: SUZ

Summary
- Airport type: Public
- Owner: Saline County
- Serves: Benton, Arkansas
- Location: Bryant, Arkansas
- Elevation AMSL: 390 ft / 119 m
- Coordinates: 34°35′25″N 092°28′46″W

Map
- Location of airport in Arkansas SUZ (the United States)

Runways
Direction	Length		Surface
Direction	ft	m	Surface
2/20	5,001	1,524	Asphalt

Statistics (2021)
- Aircraft operations: 57,500
- Based aircraft: 62
- Source: Federal Aviation Administration

Saline County Regional Airport (ICAO: KSUZ, FAA LID: SUZ) is a county-owned, public-use airport located five nautical miles (6 mi, 9 km) east of the central business district of Benton, a city in Saline County, Arkansas, United States. The airport's address is 1100 Hill Farm Road in Bryant, Arkansas. It is included in the FAA's National Plan of Integrated Airport Systems for 2011–2015, which categorized it as a general aviation facility.

Although most U.S. airports use the same three-letter location identifier for the FAA and IATA, this facility is assigned SUZ by the FAA but has no designation from the IATA (which assigned SUZ to Suria Airport in Papua New Guinea).

== History ==
The airport is located on a 1,200-acre (490 ha) site donated to Saline County by ALCOA in August 2002. Construction began in November 2002 and the airport opened on March 12, 2007. The existing Saline County Airport (FAA LID: M99), also known as Watts Field, was closed after the new airport opened.

== Facilities and aircraft ==
Saline County Regional Airport has one runway designated 2/20 with an asphalt surface measuring 5,001 by 100 feet (1,524 x 30 m).

For the 12-month period ending July 31, 2021, the airport had 57,500 aircraft operations, an average of 157 per day: 99% general aviation and 1% military. At that time there were 62 aircraft based at this airport: 84% single-engine, 6% multi-engine and 6% helicopter.

== See also ==
- List of airports in Arkansas
