= Fordyce Municipal Airport =

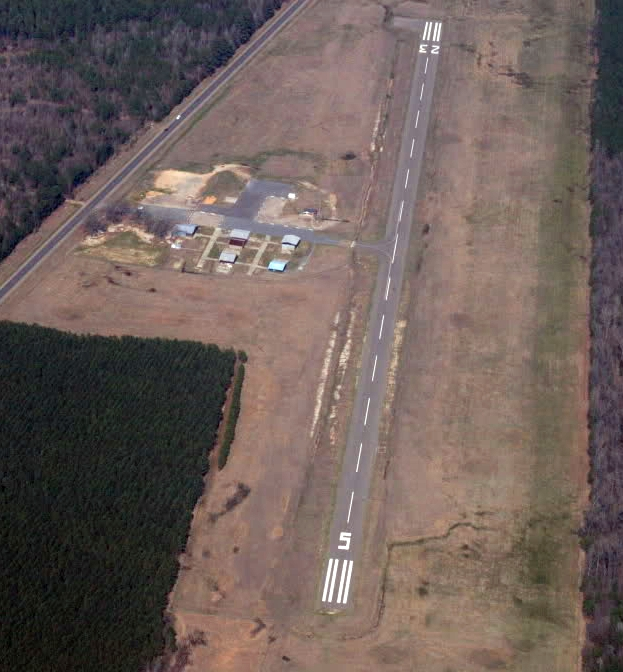
- IATA: none; ICAO: none; FAA LID: 5M4

Summary
- Airport type: Public
- Owner: City of Fordyce
- Serves: Fordyce, Arkansas
- Elevation AMSL: 193 ft (59 m)
- Coordinates: 33°50′45″N 092°21′56″W

Map
- Location of airport in Arkansas 5M4 (the United States)

Runways
Direction	Length		Surface
Direction	ft	m	Surface
5/23	3,183	970	Asphalt

Statistics (2010)
- Aircraft operations: 2,200
- Based aircraft: 2
- Source: Federal Aviation Administration

Fordyce Municipal Airport (FAA LID: 5M4), formerly known as H.L. Hopkins–Fordyce Municipal Airport, is a public use airport in Dallas County, Arkansas, United States. It is owned by the City of Fordyce and located three nautical miles (6 km) northeast of its central business district. This airport is included in the National Plan of Integrated Airport Systems for 2011–2015, which categorized it as a general aviation facility.

== Facilities and aircraft ==
Fordyce Municipal Airport covers an area of 109 acres (44 ha) at an elevation of 193 feet (59 m) above mean sea level. It has one runway designated 5/23 with an asphalt surface measuring 3,183 by 60 feet (970 x 18 m).

For the 12-month period ending July 31, 2010, the airport had 2,200 general aviation aircraft operations, an average of 42 per week. At that time there were two single-engine aircraft based at this airport.

== See also ==
- List of airports in Arkansas
