= Searcy Municipal Airport =

Airport in Arkansas, United States

Searcy Regional Airport
- IATA: SRC; ICAO: KSRC; FAA LID: SRC

Summary
- Airport type: Public
- Owner: City of Searcy
- Serves: Searcy, Arkansas
- Elevation AMSL: 265 ft (81 m)
- Coordinates: 35°12′38″N 091°44′15″W

Map
- Location of airport in Arkansas SRC (the United States)

Runways
Direction	Length		Surface
Direction	ft	m	Surface
1/19	6,008	1,831	Asphalt

Statistics
- Aircraft operations (2024): 31,560
- Based aircraft (2020): 119
- Source: Federal Aviation Administration

Searcy Regional Airport (IATA: SRC, ICAO: KSRC, FAA LID: SRC) is a city-owned public-use airport located three nautical miles (4 mi, 6 km) south of the central business district of Searcy, in White County, Arkansas, United States.

This airport is included in the FAA's National Plan of Integrated Airport Systems for 2019–2023, which categorized it as a general aviation facility.

== Facilities and aircraft ==
Searcy Regional Airport covers an area of 330 acres (134 ha) at an elevation of 265 feet (81 m) above mean sea level. It has one runway designated 1/19 with an asphalt surface measuring 6,008 by 100 feet (1,831 x 30 m).

For the 12-month period ending July 31, 2020, the airport had 31,560 aircraft operations, an average of 86 per day: 95% general aviation, 3% air taxi and 2% military. In December 2020, there were 101 aircraft based at this airport: 79 single-engine, 12 multi-engine, 3 jet and 7 helicopter.

== See also ==
- List of airports in Arkansas
