= Marianna/Lee County Airport =

Airport in Arkansas, United States

Marianna/Lee County Airport Steve Edwards Field
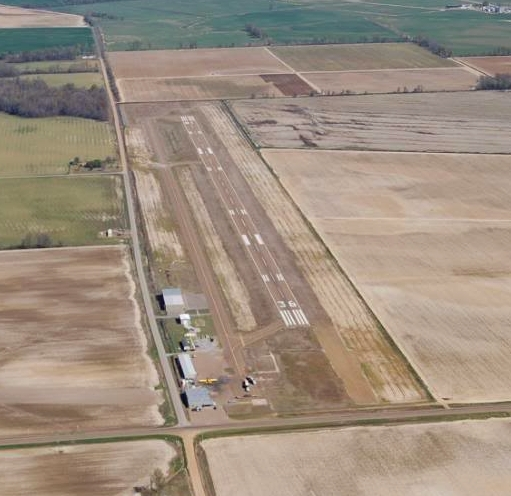
- IATA: none; ICAO: none; FAA LID: 6M7

Summary
- Airport type: Public
- Owner: City of Marianna
- Serves: Marianna, Arkansas
- Elevation AMSL: 219 ft (67 m)
- Coordinates: 34°46′58″N 090°48′36″W

Map
- Location of airport in Arkansas 6M7 (the United States)

Runways
Direction	Length		Surface
Direction	ft	m	Surface
18/36	4,021	1,226	Asphalt

Statistics (2012)
- Aircraft operations: 25,050
- Based aircraft: 6
- Source: Federal Aviation Administration

Marianna/Lee County Airport (FAA LID: 6M7), also known as Steve Edwards Field, is a public use airport in Lee County, Arkansas, United States. It is owned by the City of Marianna and located three nautical miles (6 km) west of its central business district. This airport is included in the National Plan of Integrated Airport Systems for 2011–2015, which categorized it as a general aviation facility.

== Facilities and aircraft ==
Marianna/Lee County Airport covers an area of 55 acres (22 ha) at an elevation of 219 feet (67 m) above mean sea level. It has one runway designated 18/36 with an asphalt surface measuring 4,021 by 75 feet (1,226 x 23 m).

For the 12-month period ending July 31, 2012, the airport had 25,050 aircraft operations, an average of 68 per day: 99.8% general aviation and 0.2% military. At that time there were six aircraft based at this airport: 83% single-engine and 17% helicopter.

== See also ==
- List of airports in Arkansas
