= J. Lynn Helms Sevier County Airport =

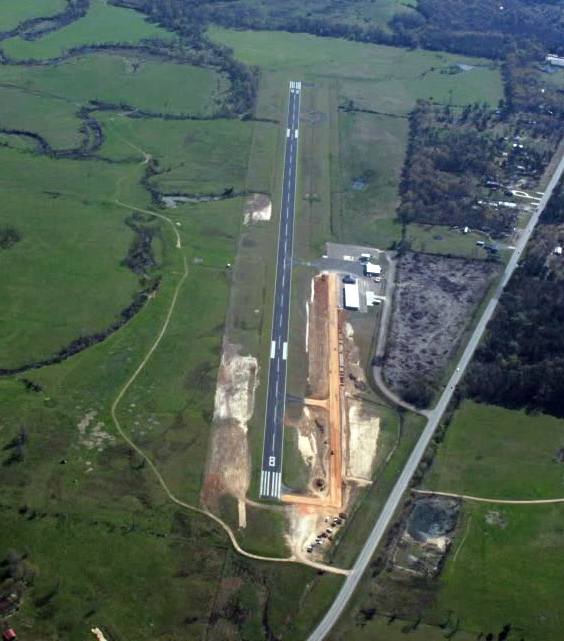
- IATA: none; ICAO: KDEQ; FAA LID: DEQ

Summary
- Airport type: Public
- Owner: Sevier County
- Serves: De Queen, Arkansas
- Elevation AMSL: 355 ft (108 m)
- Coordinates: 34°02′49″N 094°23′58″W

Map
- Location of airport in Arkansas DEQ (the United States)

Runways
Direction	Length		Surface
Direction	ft	m	Surface
8/26	5,001	1,524	Asphalt

Statistics (2010)
- Aircraft operations: 11,700
- Based aircraft: 8
- Source: Federal Aviation Administration

J. Lynn Helms Sevier County Airport (ICAO: KDEQ, FAA LID: DEQ, formerly F90) is a county-owned public-use airport in Sevier County, Arkansas, United States. It is located three nautical miles (4 mi, 6 km) west of the central business district of De Queen, Arkansas. The airport is named for J. Lynn Helms, who was Administrator of the Federal Aviation Administration under U.S. President Ronald Reagan. Helms was born in De Queen.

This airport is included in the FAA's National Plan of Integrated Airport Systems for 2011–2015, which categorized it as a general aviation airport.

Although most U.S. airports use the same three-letter location identifier for the FAA and IATA, this airport is assigned DEQ by the FAA but has no designation from the IATA.

== Facilities and aircraft ==
J. Lynn Helms Sevier County Airport covers an area of 85 acres (34 ha) at an elevation of 355 feet (108 m) above mean sea level. It has one runway, designated 8/26, with an asphalt surface measuring 5,001 by 75 feet (1,524 x 23 m).

For the 12-month period ending August 31, 2010, the airport had 11,700 aircraft operations, an average of 32 per day: 98% general aviation and 2% military. At that time there were eight aircraft based at the airport: 7 single-engine airplanes, and 1 helicopter.

== See also ==
- List of airports in Arkansas
