= Clarendon Municipal Airport =

Airport in Arkansas, United States

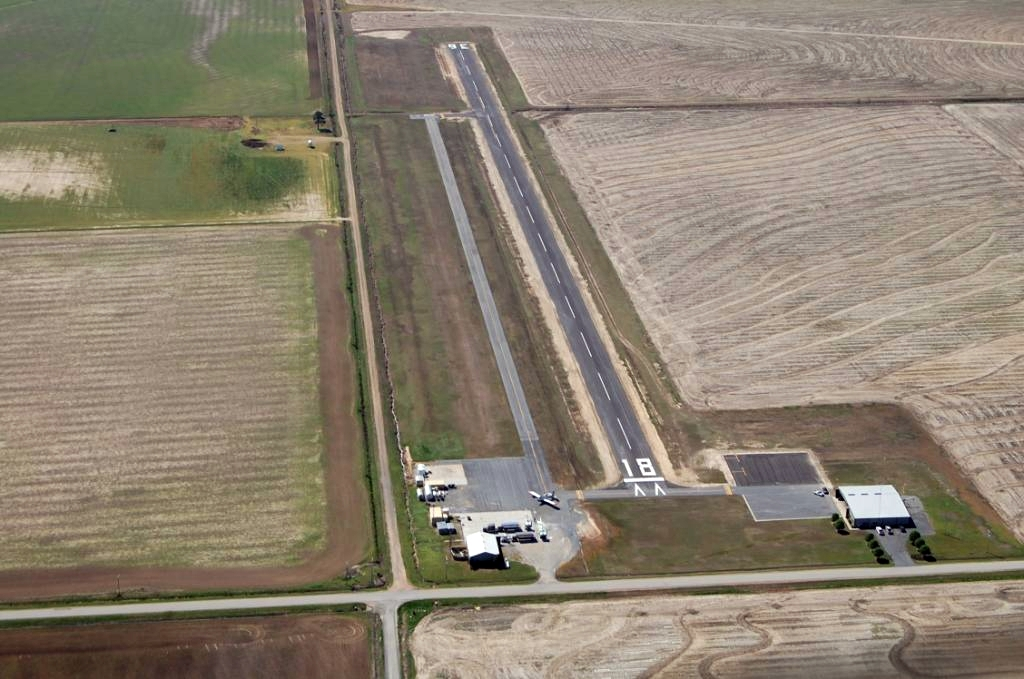
- IATA: none; ICAO: none; FAA LID: 4M8

Summary
- Airport type: Public
- Owner: City of Clarendon
- Serves: Clarendon, Arkansas
- Elevation AMSL: 217 ft (66 m)
- Coordinates: 34°38′48″N 091°23′41″W

Map
- Location of airport in Arkansas 4M8 (the United States)

Runways
Direction	Length		Surface
Direction	ft	m	Surface
18/36	3,200	975	Asphalt

Statistics (2012)
- Aircraft operations: 26,500
- Based aircraft: 4
- Source: Federal Aviation Administration

Clarendon Municipal Airport (FAA LID: 4M8) is a city-owned, public-use airport located five nautical miles (6 mi, 9 km) southwest of the central business district of Clarendon, a city in Monroe County, Arkansas, United States. It is included in the National Plan of Integrated Airport Systems for 2011–2015, which categorized it as a general aviation facility.

== Facilities and aircraft ==
Clarendon Municipal Airport covers an area of 160 acres (65 ha) at an elevation of 217 feet (66 m) above mean sea level. It has one runway designated 18/36 with an asphalt surface measuring 3,200 by 60 feet (975 x 18 m).

For the 12-month period ending August 31, 2012, the airport had 26,500 aircraft operations, an average of 72 per day: 98% general aviation and 2% military. At that time there were four single-engine aircraft based at this airport.

== See also ==
- List of airports in Arkansas
