= Sally Wofford Airport =

- IATA: none; ICAO: none; FAA LID: 8M2

Summary
- Airport type: Public
- Owner: T. L. Wofford
- Serves: Weiner, Arkansas
- Elevation AMSL: 245 ft / 75 m
- Coordinates: 35°35′25″N 090°54′49″W
- Interactive map of Sally Wofford Airport

Runways
Direction	Length		Surface
Direction	ft	m	Surface
1/19	2,330	710	Asphalt/turf

Statistics (2010)
- Aircraft operations: 25,130
- Source: Federal Aviation Administration

Sally Wofford Airport (FAA LID: 8M2) is a privately owned public-use airport in Poinsett County, Arkansas, United States. It is located three nautical miles (4 mi, 6 km) south of the central business district of Weiner, Arkansas.

== Facilities and aircraft ==
Sally Wofford Airport covers an area of 15 acres (6 ha) at an elevation of 245 feet (75 m) above mean sea level. It has one runway designated 1/19 with an asphalt and turf surface measuring 2,330 by 160 feet (710 x 49 m). For the 12-month period ending July 18, 2010, the airport had 25,130 general aviation aircraft operations, an average of 68 per day.

== See also ==
- List of airports in Arkansas
