= Sharp County Regional Airport =

Airport in Arkansas

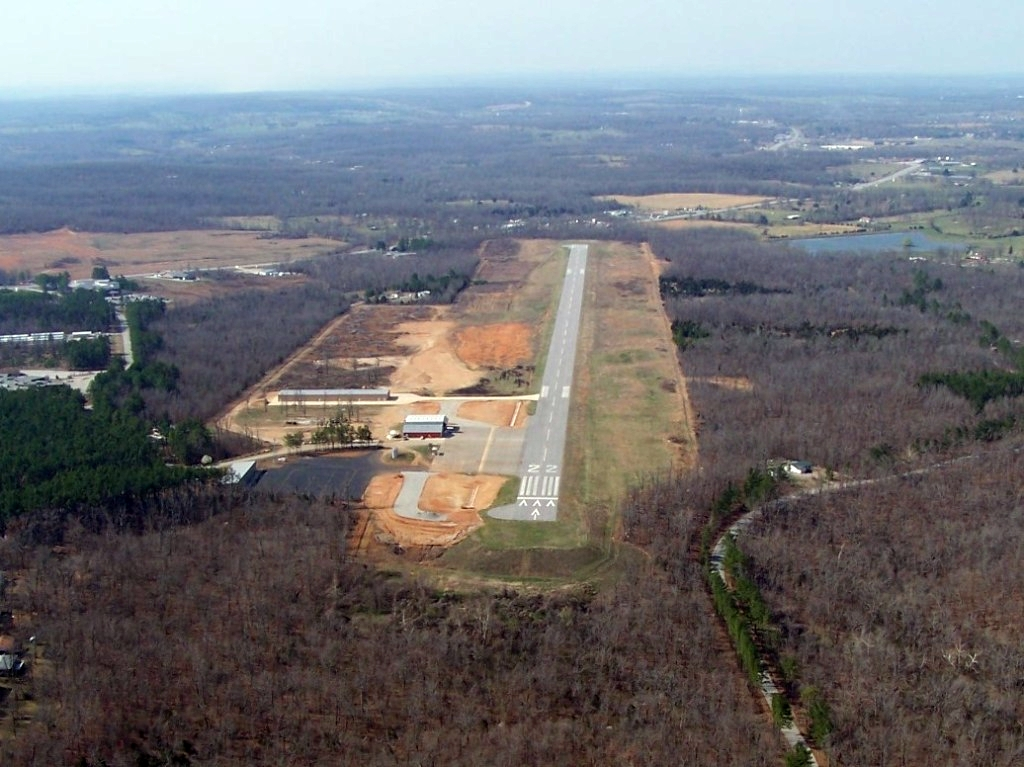
- IATA: CKK; ICAO: KCVK; FAA LID: CVK

Summary
- Airport type: Public
- Owner: Sharp County Regional Airport Authority
- Serves: Ash Flat, Arkansas
- Elevation AMSL: 716 ft / 218 m
- Coordinates: 36°15′54″N 091°33′46″W

Map
- Location of airport in Arkansas CVK (the United States)

Runways
Direction	Length		Surface
Direction	ft	m	Surface
4/22	5,156	1,572	Asphalt

Statistics (2010)
- Aircraft operations: 4,400
- Based aircraft: 7
- Source: Federal Aviation Administration

Sharp County Regional Airport (IATA: CKK, ICAO: KCVK, FAA LID: CVK) is a public-use airport in Sharp County, Arkansas, United States. It is located three nautical miles (4 mi, 6 km) northeast of the central business district of Ash Flat. The airport is owned by the Sharp County Regional Airport Authority.

This airport is included in the FAA's National Plan of Integrated Airport Systems for 2011–2015, which categorized it as a general aviation airport.

Although most U.S. airports use the same three-letter location identifier for the FAA and IATA, this airport is assigned CVK by the FAA and CKK by the IATA.

== Facilities and aircraft ==
Sharp County Regional Airport covers an area of 60 acres (24 ha) at an elevation of 716 feet (218 m) above mean sea level. It has one runway designated 4/22 with an asphalt surface measuring 5,156 by 75 feet (1,572 m × 23 m). For the 12-month period ending May 31, 2010, the airport had 4,400 aircraft operations, an average of 12 per day: 98% general aviation and 2% military.

== See also ==
- List of airports in Arkansas
