= Rogers Executive Airport =

Rogers Executive Airport Carter Field
- IATA: ROG; ICAO: KROG; FAA LID: ROG

Summary
- Airport type: Public
- Owner: City of Rogers
- Serves: Rogers, Arkansas
- Elevation AMSL: 1,359 ft (414 m)
- Coordinates: 36°22′21″N 094°06′25″W

Map
- Location of airport in Arkansas ROG (the United States)

Runways
Direction	Length		Surface
Direction	ft	m	Surface
2/20	6,011	1,832	Asphalt

Statistics
- Aircraft operations (2019): 32,000
- Based aircraft (2022): 117
- Source: Federal Aviation Administration

Rogers Executive Airport (IATA: ROG, ICAO: KROG, FAA LID: ROG), also known as Carter Field, is a city-owned public-use airport located two nautical miles (3.7 km) north of the central business district of Rogers, a city in Benton County, Arkansas, United States. This airport is included in the FAA's National Plan of Integrated Airport Systems for 2021–2025, which categorized it as a general aviation facility.

== Facilities and aircraft ==
Rogers Executive Airport covers an area of 460 acres (190 ha) at an elevation of 1,359 feet (414 m) above mean sea level. It has one runway designated 2/20 with an asphalt surface measuring 6,011 by 100 feet (1,832 x 30 m).

For the 12-month period ending June 30, 2019, the airport had 32,000 aircraft operations, an average of 88 per day: 94% general aviation and 6% air taxi. In May 2022, there were 117 aircraft based at this airport: 79 single-engine, 12 multi-engine and 26 jets.

Beaver Lake Aviation is the airport's full service FBO. The airport features a fully staffed Control Tower, as well as on-site Index A ARFF coverage provided by Rogers Fire Department Station 3.

The airport is also the hub for Walmart Aviation, which operates the private jet fleet for Walmart Inc. The Bentonville, Arkansas-based company stores 22 of its private jets at the location and has contributed greatly to the development of the airport. It uses these jets to transport employees to the remote locations of its many retail stores.

== See also ==
- List of airports in Arkansas
