= Calico Rock–Izard County Airport =

Airport in Arkansas, United States

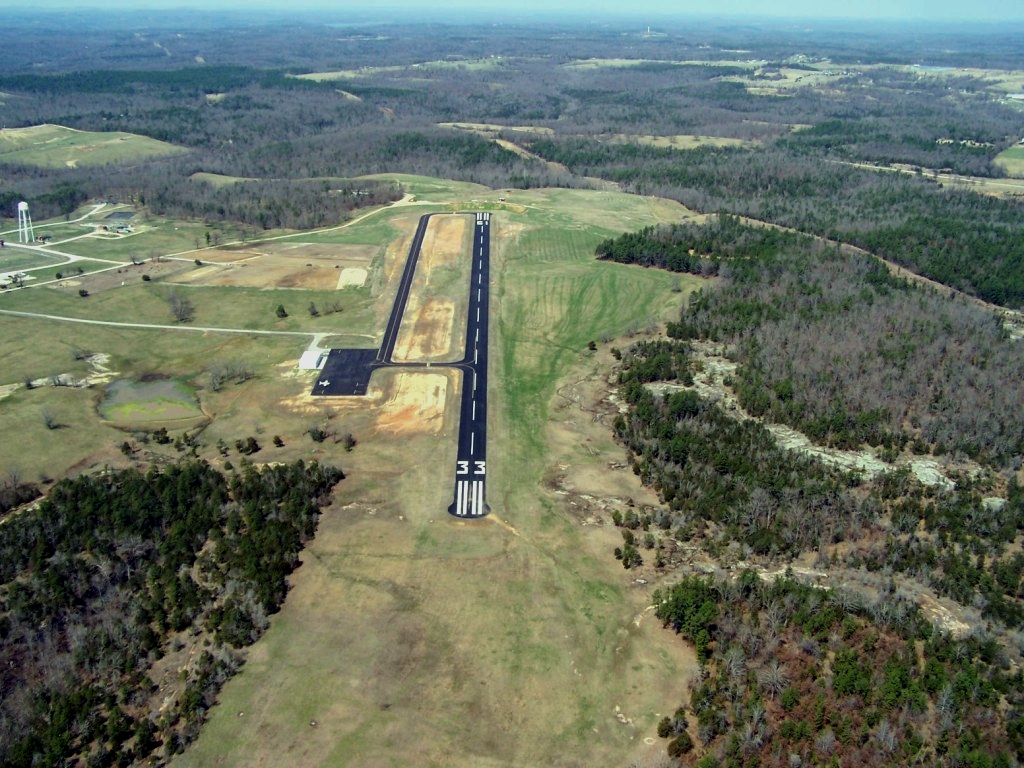
- IATA: none; ICAO: none; FAA LID: 37T

Summary
- Airport type: Public
- Owner: Arkansas Department of Correction
- Serves: Calico Rock, Arkansas
- Elevation AMSL: 733 ft (223 m)
- Coordinates: 36°09′52″N 092°08′40″W

Map
- Location of airport in Arkansas 37T (the United States)

Runways
Direction	Length		Surface
Direction	ft	m	Surface
15/33	3,000	914	Asphalt

Statistics (2011)
- Aircraft operations: 2,620
- Based aircraft: 4
- Source: Federal Aviation Administration

Calico Rock–Izard County Airport (FAA LID: 37T) is a public use airport located three nautical miles (6 km) northwest of the central business district of Calico Rock, a city in Izard County, Arkansas, United States. The airport is owned by the Arkansas Department of Correction and situated adjacent to its North Central Unit prison.

This airport is included in the National Plan of Integrated Airport Systems for 2011–2015, which categorized it as a general aviation facility.

== Facilities and aircraft ==
Calico Rock–Izard County Airport covers an area of 60 acres (24 ha) at an elevation of 733 feet (223 m) above mean sea level. It has one runway designated 15/33 with an asphalt surface measuring 3,000 by 60 feet (914 x 18 m).

For the 12-month period ending July 31, 2011, the airport had 2,620 aircraft operations, an average of 218 per month: 99% general aviation and 1% military. At that time there were four single-engine aircraft based at this airport.

== See also ==
- List of airports in Arkansas
