= Dennis F. Cantrell Field =

Former airport in Conway, Arkansas

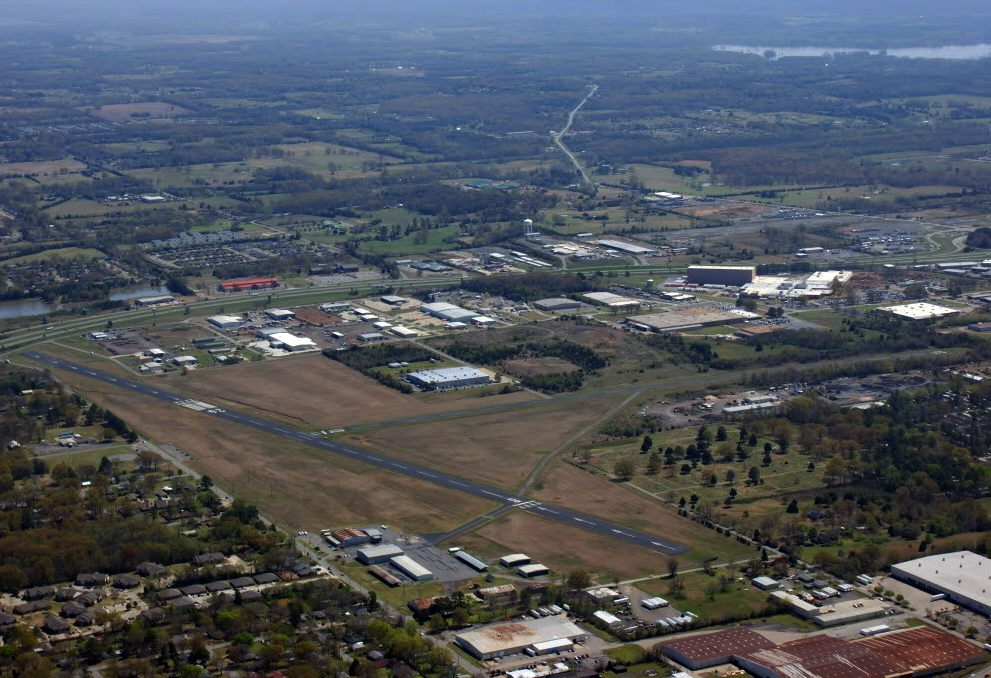
- IATA: none; ICAO: ~~KCWS~~; FAA LID: ~~CWS~~

Summary
- Airport type: Public
- Owner: City of Conway
- Serves: Conway, Arkansas
- Closed: January 31, 2015
- Elevation AMSL: 316 ft (96 m)
- Coordinates: 35°04′51″N 092°25′30″W

Map
- Location of airport in Arkansas

Runways
Direction	Length		Surface
Direction	ft	m	Surface
8/26	4,875	1,486	Asphalt
18/36	3,278	999	Asphalt

Statistics (2010)
- Aircraft operations: 16,000
- Based aircraft: 41
- Source: Federal Aviation Administration

Dennis F. Cantrell Field (ICAO: ~~KCWS~~, FAA LID: ~~CWS, formerly M03~~) was a public use airport located one nautical mile (2 km) southeast of the central business district of Conway, in Faulkner County, Arkansas, United States. It was owned by the City of Conway.

It was replaced with the new Conway Airport at Cantrell Field since September 2014.

This airport was included in the FAA's National Plan of Integrated Airport Systems for 2011–2015, which categorized it as a general aviation airport.

Although most U.S. airports use the same three-letter location identifier for the FAA and IATA, this airport was assigned CWS by the FAA but had no designation from the IATA (IATA designation CWS is assigned to Center Island, Washington airport, which is FAA designation 78WA).

== Facilities and aircraft ==
Dennis F. Cantrell Field covered an area of 198 acres (80 ha) at an elevation of 316 feet (96 m) above mean sea level. It had two asphalt paved runways: 8/26 was 4,875 by 100 feet (1,486 x 30 m) and 18/36 was 3,278 by 60 feet (999 x 18 m).

For the 12-month period ending January 31, 2010, the airport had 16,000 aircraft operations, an average of 43 per day: 94% general aviation, 3% air taxi, and 3% military. At that time there were 41 aircraft based at this airport: 73% single-engine, 22% multi-engine, 2% jet, and 2% helicopter.

== Aviation Accidents ==
On June 30, 2007, a Cessna Citation I aircraft attempting to land at the airfield instead crashed into a nearby house, killing the pilot and a woman on the ground. Wet conditions, combined with pilot error in landing too far down the runway, prevented the plane from having enough room to either safely stop or to attempt another takeoff. The plane continued off the runway until colliding with a wall and then the house, which was located 500 feet away. Both the passenger and the other occupant of the house survived the crash. A similar incident occurred in 1990, when a plane crashed into a fence and house near the airport, killing the co-pilot.

On November 7, 2012, a 65-year-old pilot from Mississippi crashed shortly after takeoff from the airfield. He reported engine troubles and attempted to return to the airport, but instead collided with trees and crashed. He later died of his injuries.

Safety of the airport was a primary concern in the decision to relocate to a new site. The existing airfield was considered too close to Interstate 40 and nearby residential areas, and it lacked sufficient space to accommodate jet traffic. The new Conway airport covers 431 acres of land, compared to the 150 acres formerly occupied by KCWS.
