= Stuttgart Army Air Field (Arkansas) =

Former airfield in Arkansas, United States

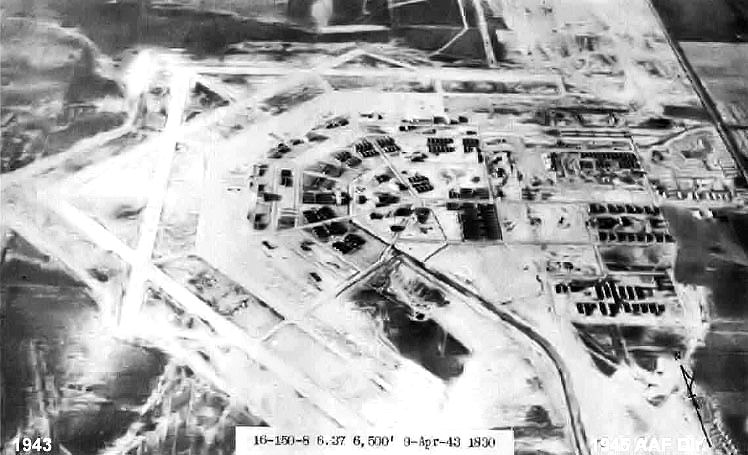
- Stuttgart Army Air Field, Arkansas, 3 April 1943
- IATA: none; ICAO: none

Summary
- Serves: Stuttgart, Arkansas
- Built: 1942
- In use: 1942–1945
- Coordinates: 34°35′51″N 091°34′29″W

Map
- Stuttgart Army Air Field, Arkansas

Runways
| Direction | Length | | Surface |
| Direction | ft | m | Surface |
|---|---|---|---|
| 01/19 | 5,000 | 1,524 | Asphalt |
| 05/23 | 5,000 | 1,524 | Asphalt |
| 09/27 | 5,000 | 1,524 | Asphalt |
| 13/32 | 5,000 | 1,524 | Asphalt |

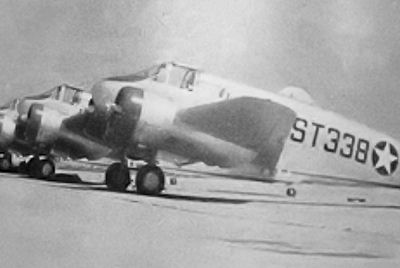
Beechcraft AT-10 Wichita at Stuttgart AAF. Note fuselage code "ST".

for the civilian airport, see Stuttgart Municipal Airport, for the current US Army installation in Germany see Stuttgart Army Airfield (Germany)

Stuttgart Army Airfield is a former World War II military airfield, located 7 miles north of Stuttgart, Arkansas. It operated as an advanced pilot training school for the United States Army Air Forces from 1942 until 1945.

== History ==
Stuttgart Municipal Airport dates to 1942 when it was built by the United States Army Air Forces as a training airfield as part of the 70,000 Pilot Training Program. It was one of many air fields created in the country’s interior during the war. The airfield consisted of four main 5'000 ft concrete and asphalt runways, aligned 01/19; 05/23; 09/27 and 13/31. In addition to the main airfield, seven axillary fields were constructed to support the training mission. Those were located as follows:

- Stuttgart AAF Auxiliary#1 (Carlisle) 34°48′29″N 091°42′43″W
- Stuttgart AAF Auxiliary#2 (Hazen) 34°45′59″N 091°38′18″W
- Stuttgart AAF Auxiliary#5 (Almyra) 34°24′39″N 091°27′41″W

The locations of auxiliaries #3 (Roe), #4, #6 and #7 (Stuttgart) are undetermined.

The school and airfield was activated on 15 August 1942 and used by the Army Air Forces Training Command. Initially it was used as a glider pilot training school using Waco CG-4A gliders. In 1943 the airfield was transferred to Southeast Training Command as an advanced twin-engine flying school and glider training ceased on 19 May 1943. Initially designated as Army Air Forces Advanced Flying School, it was redesignated as Stuttgart Army Air Field on 2 January 1943. Stuttgart AAF primarily trained medium bomber and transport pilots using the Beechcraft AT-10 Wichita and Cessna AT-17 Bobcat, the host unit being the 34th Two Engine Flying Training Group and the 891st through 896th Two Engine Flying Training Squadrons. Aircraft assigned to Stuttgart AAF carried the fuselage code "ST". With a reorganization of Training Command's training unit designation system in the spring of 1944, the 34th and its squadrons were disbanded on 1 April 1944; the school being operated by the 2141st Army Air Force Base Unit, its training squadrons being re-designated "A" through "F" in sequence.

Twin engine training continued until 31 January 1945, when the airfield was transferred to Third Air Force. It became a Replacement Training School under its 2d Tactical Air Division and began training replacement reconnaissance pilots under the 74th Tactical Reconnaissance Group and fighter pilots under the 369th Fighter Group

With the end of World War II, the airfield was placed on standby status in early 1946, and turned over to Air Technical Service Command (ATSC). ATSC's mission was to remove all usable military equipment from the property and dispose of items which no longer had a useful need. Like many other surplus airfields around the country, public sales were held to offer the material to the public. Stuttgart Army Airfield was declared excess and closed on 5 August 1946. It was conveyed though the War Assets Administration (WAA) to the City of Stuttgart to establish a municipal airport.

== Current status ==
Today, the former training field is a general aviation airport, serving the local area. Most of the World War II runways are closed, two still remaining in use as a main and as a crosswind runway. The massive parking apron remains, mostly unused, and sections of unused taxiways and runways remain, some partially removed for hardcore. The large station area is obliterated, the wartime streets removed; the buildings long torn down or moved with a few concrete foundations remaining in the large grassy area. Ghostly outlines of streets can be seen in aerial imagery. The military hangars on the flightline are gone, their concrete floors visible and exposed to the elements.

== See also ==
- Arkansas World War II Army Airfields
- 30th Flying Training Wing (World War II)
