= Crystal Lake Airport =

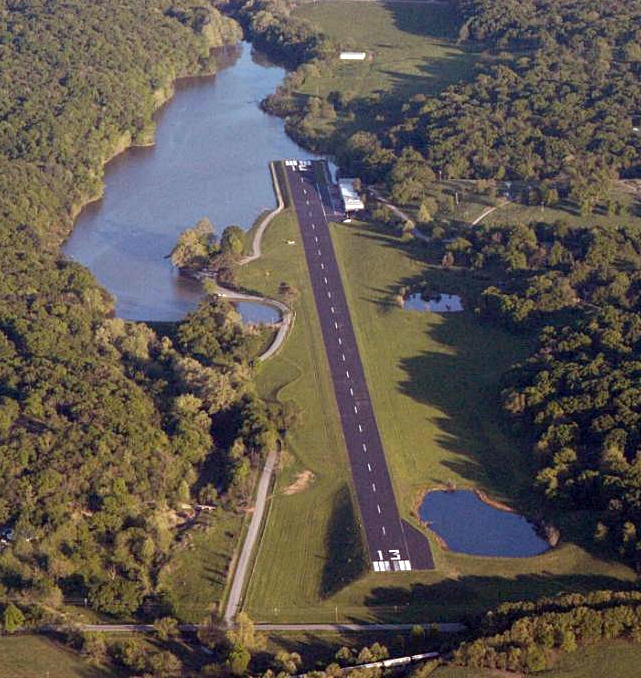
- IATA: none; ICAO: none; FAA LID: 5M5

Summary
- Airport type: Public use
- Owner: Peterson Farms
- Serves: Decatur, Arkansas
- Elevation AMSL: 1,177 ft (359 m)
- Coordinates: 36°20′37″N 094°26′41″W

Map
- Location of airport in Arkansas

Runways
Direction	Length		Surface
Direction	ft	m	Surface
13/31	3,863	1,177	Asphalt

Statistics (2010)
- Aircraft operations: 750
- Based aircraft: 3
- Source: Federal Aviation Administration

Crystal Lake Airport (FAA LID: 5M5) is a privately owned, public use airport located two nautical miles (4 km) northeast of the central business district of Decatur, a city in Benton County, Arkansas, United States.

== Facilities and aircraft ==
Crystal Lake Airport covers an area of 10 acres (4 ha) at an elevation of 1,177 feet (359 m) above mean sea level. It has one runway designated 13/31 with an asphalt surface measuring 3,863 by 75 feet (1,177 x 23 m).

For the 12-month period ending March 31, 2010, the airport had 750 general aviation aircraft operations, an average of 62 per month. At that time there were 8 aircraft based at this airport, all single-engine.

== See also ==
- List of airports in Arkansas
