= Dexter B. Florence Memorial Field =

Airport in Arkansas, United States

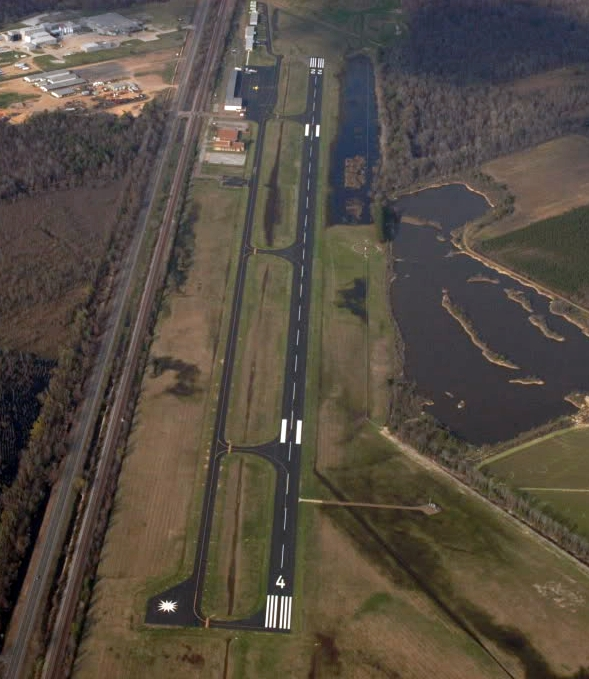
- IATA: none; ICAO: KADF; FAA LID: ADF

Summary
- Airport type: Public
- Owner: City of Arkadelphia
- Serves: Arkadelphia, Arkansas
- Elevation AMSL: 182 ft (55 m)
- Coordinates: 34°05′59″N 093°03′58″W

Map
- Location of airport in Arkansas ADF (the United States)

Runways
Direction	Length		Surface
Direction	ft	m	Surface
4/22	5,002	1,525	Asphalt

Statistics (2021)
- Aircraft operations: 38,400
- Based aircraft: 23
- Source: Federal Aviation Administration

Dexter B. Florence Memorial Field (ICAO: KADF, FAA LID: ADF) (formerly identified as M89 by FAA) is a city-owned public-use airport located one nautical mile (2 km) south of the central business district of Arkadelphia, a city in Clark County, Arkansas, United States.

This airport is included in the FAA's National Plan of Integrated Airport Systems for 2011–2015, which categorized it as a general aviation facility.

== Facilities and aircraft ==
Dexter B. Florence Memorial Field covers an area of 203 acres (82 ha) at an elevation of 182 feet (55 m) above mean sea level. It has one runway designated 4/22 with an asphalt surface measuring 5,002 by 75 feet (1,525 x 23 m).

For the 12-month period ending December 31, 2021, the airport had 38,400 aircraft operations, an average of 105 per day: 99% general aviation, <1% air taxi, and <1% military. At that time there were 23 aircraft based at this airport: 19 single-engine, 3 multi-engine, and 1 jet.

== See also ==
- List of airports in Arkansas
