= Crystal Airport (California) =

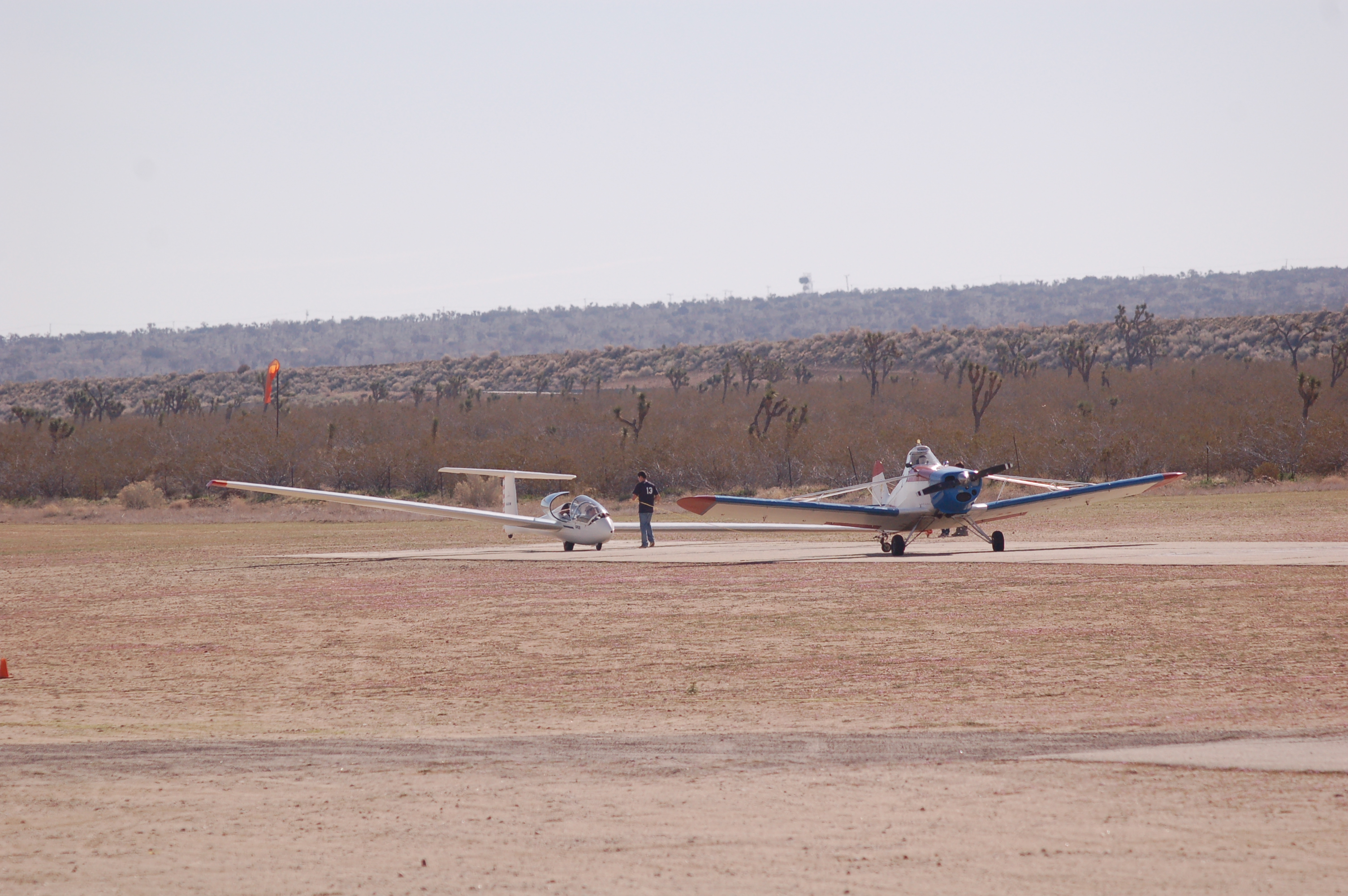
- A Piper PA-25 Pawnee prepares to tow a Grob 103 Twin Astir at Crystal Airport.
- IATA: none; ICAO: none; FAA LID: 46CN

Summary
- Airport type: Private
- Serves: Llano, California
- Elevation AMSL: 3,420 ft / 1,042 m
- Interactive map of Crystal Airport

Runways
Direction	Length		Surface
Direction	ft	m	Surface
7/25	2,700	823	Asphalt
- Source: Airnav.com

Crystal Airport (FAA LID: 46CN) is a private-use airport located six miles south of Pearblossom, California, United States.

== Facilities and aircraft ==
Crystal Airport is primarily a Glider-port, that is home to the Southern California Soaring Academy, a glider school and FBO at the airport. Its proximity to the San Gabriel Mountains makes it a popular soaring location because of excellent ridge lift, and thermal lift from its location in the high desert of California. It is located approximately 30 nm from Edwards Air Force Base, and the school has been previously contracted to train Air Force pilots how to fly gliders.

There are 39 aircraft based at this airport: 11 single-engine, and 28 gliders.
