= Petit Jean Park Airport =

Airport in Arkansas, United States

- IATA: MPJ; ICAO: KMPJ; FAA LID: MPJ

Summary
- Airport type: Public
- Owner: State of Arkansas
- Serves: Morrilton, Arkansas
- Elevation AMSL: 923 ft (281 m)
- Coordinates: 35°08′20″N 092°54′33″W

Map
- Location of airport in Arkansas MPJ (the United States)

Runways
Direction	Length		Surface
Direction	ft	m	Surface
3/21	5,853	1,784	Asphalt

Statistics (2009)
- Aircraft operations: 1,000
- Source: Federal Aviation Administration

Petit Jean Park Airport (IATA: MPJ, ICAO: KMPJ, FAA LID: MPJ) is a public use airport located eight nautical miles (9 mi, 15 km) west of the central business district of Morrilton, Arkansas, United States. It is owned by the State of Arkansas.

This airport is included in the FAA's National Plan of Integrated Airport Systems for 2011–2015, which categorized it as a general aviation facility.

== Facilities and aircraft ==
Petit Jean Park Airport covers an area of 148 acres (60 ha) at an elevation of 923 feet (281 m) above mean sea level. It has one runway designated 3/21 with an asphalt surface measuring 5,853 by 75 feet (1,784 x 23 m). For the 12-month period ending May 31, 2009, the airport had 1,000 aircraft operations, an average of 83 per month: 95% general aviation and 5% military.

== See also ==
- List of airports in Arkansas
