= Saline County Airport =

Airport in Arkansas, United States

Saline County Airport Watts Field
- IATA: none; ICAO: none; FAA LID: M99

Summary
- Airport type: Public
- Owner: Saline County
- Serves: Benton, Arkansas
- Elevation AMSL: 318 ft (97 m)
- Coordinates: 34°33′24″N 092°36′25″W
- Website: www.salinecounty.org/...
- Interactive map of Saline County Airport

Runways
Direction	Length		Surface
Direction	ft	m	Surface
17/35	3,980	1,213	Asphalt

Statistics (2006)
- Aircraft operations: 39,000
- Based aircraft: 44
- Source: Federal Aviation Administration

Saline County Airport (FAA LID: M99), also known as Watts Field, was a county-owned public-use airport located one mile (2 km) west of the central business district of Benton, a city in Saline County, Arkansas, United States. The airport's address was 401 Airline Drive in Benton.

The airport opened in 1957. Construction on the new Saline County Regional Airport (ICAO: KSUZ, FAA LID: SUZ) began in November 2002 and it opened on March 12, 2007. The existing facility was closed after the new airport opened.

== Facilities and aircraft ==
Saline County Airport covered an area of 72 acres (29 ha) which contained one runway designated 17/35 with a 3,980 x 50 ft (1,213 x 15 m) asphalt surface. For the 12-month period ending August 31, 2006, the airport had 39,000 aircraft operations, an average of 106 per day: 99% general aviation and 1% military. At that time there were 44 aircraft based at this airport: 95% single-engine and 5% helicopter.
