= Hazen Municipal Airport =

Airport in Arkansas, United States

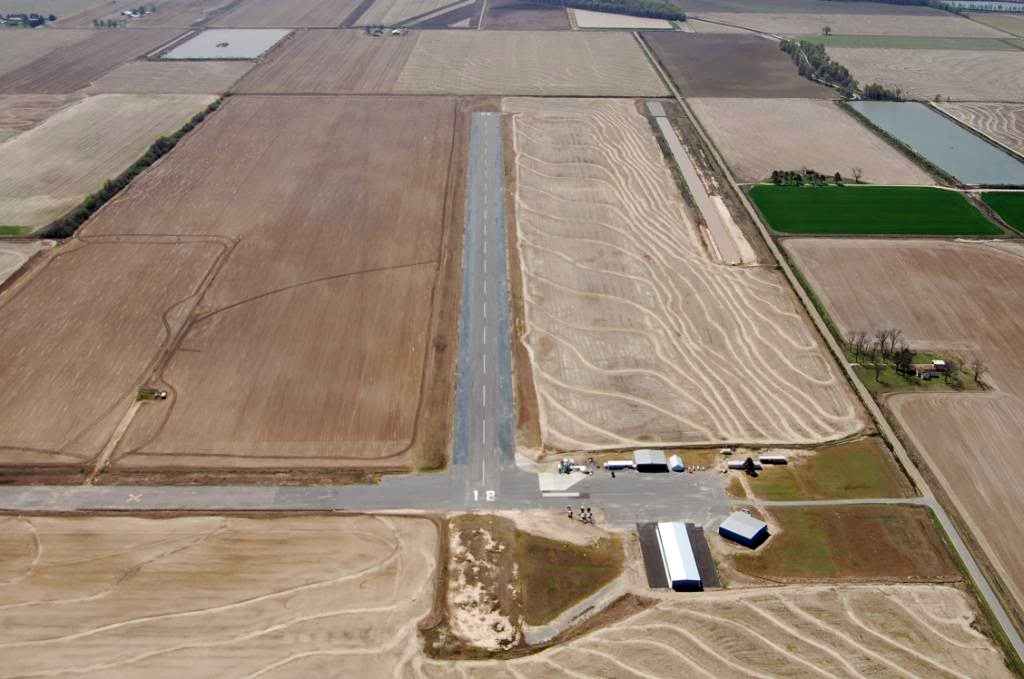
- IATA: none; ICAO: none; FAA LID: 6M0

Summary
- Airport type: Public
- Owner: City of Hazen
- Serves: Hazen, Arkansas
- Elevation AMSL: 230 ft (70 m)
- Coordinates: 34°45′33″N 091°38′17″W

Map
- Location of airport in Arkansas 6M0 (the United States)

Runways
Direction	Length		Surface
Direction	ft	m	Surface
18/36	4,048	1,234	Asphalt

Statistics (2010)
- Aircraft operations: 32,000
- Based aircraft: 15
- Source: Federal Aviation Administration

Hazen Municipal Airport (FAA LID: 6M0) is a city-owned, public-use airport located three nautical miles (6 km) southwest of the central business district of Hazen, a city in Prairie County, Arkansas, United States.

== Facilities and aircraft ==
Hazen Municipal Airport covers an area of 480 acres (194 ha) at an elevation of 230 feet (70 m) above mean sea level. It has one runway designated 18/36 with an asphalt surface measuring 4,048 by 150 feet (1,234 x 46 m).

For the 12-month period ending September 30, 2010, the airport had 32,000 general aviation aircraft operations, an average of 87 per day. At that time there were 15 aircraft based at this airport: 93% single-engine and 7% multi-engine.

== History ==
The airport was built by the United States Army Air Forces during 1942/43 as an axillary airfield for Stuttgart Army Airfield, near Stuttgart, Arkansas. It was known simply as Stuttgart Army Airfield Auxiliary #2. The runways in use today were built during that period. It was used to help train medium bomber and transport pilots, who used it for emergencies on it or practiced touch-and-go landings. It was not staffed, and at the end of World War II it was simply abandoned and the land turned over to local authorities, like many other small auxiliary airfields.

The City of Hazen developed the current airport from the former military airfield.

== See also ==
- List of airports in Arkansas
