= Danville, Arkansas =

- City
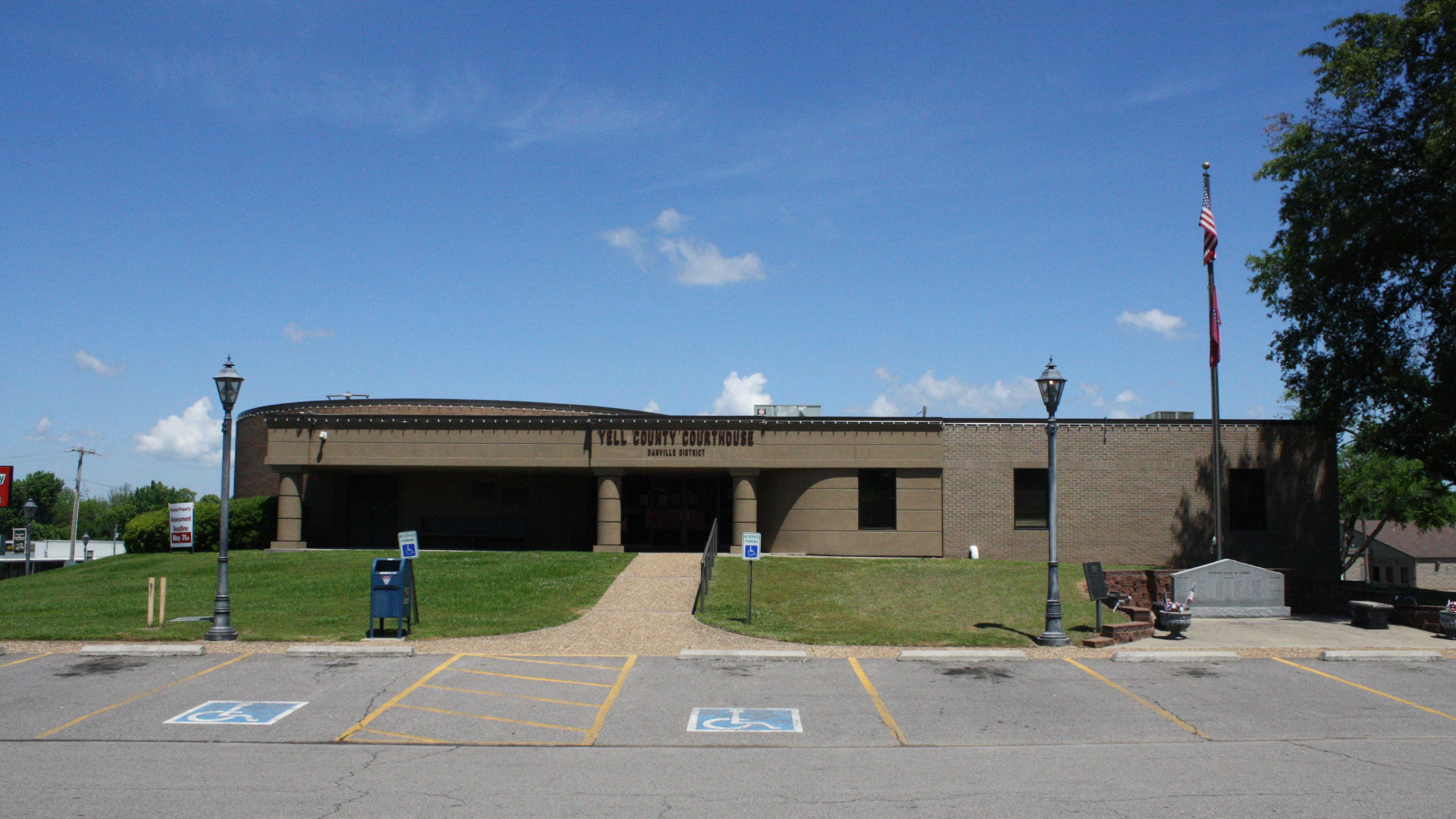
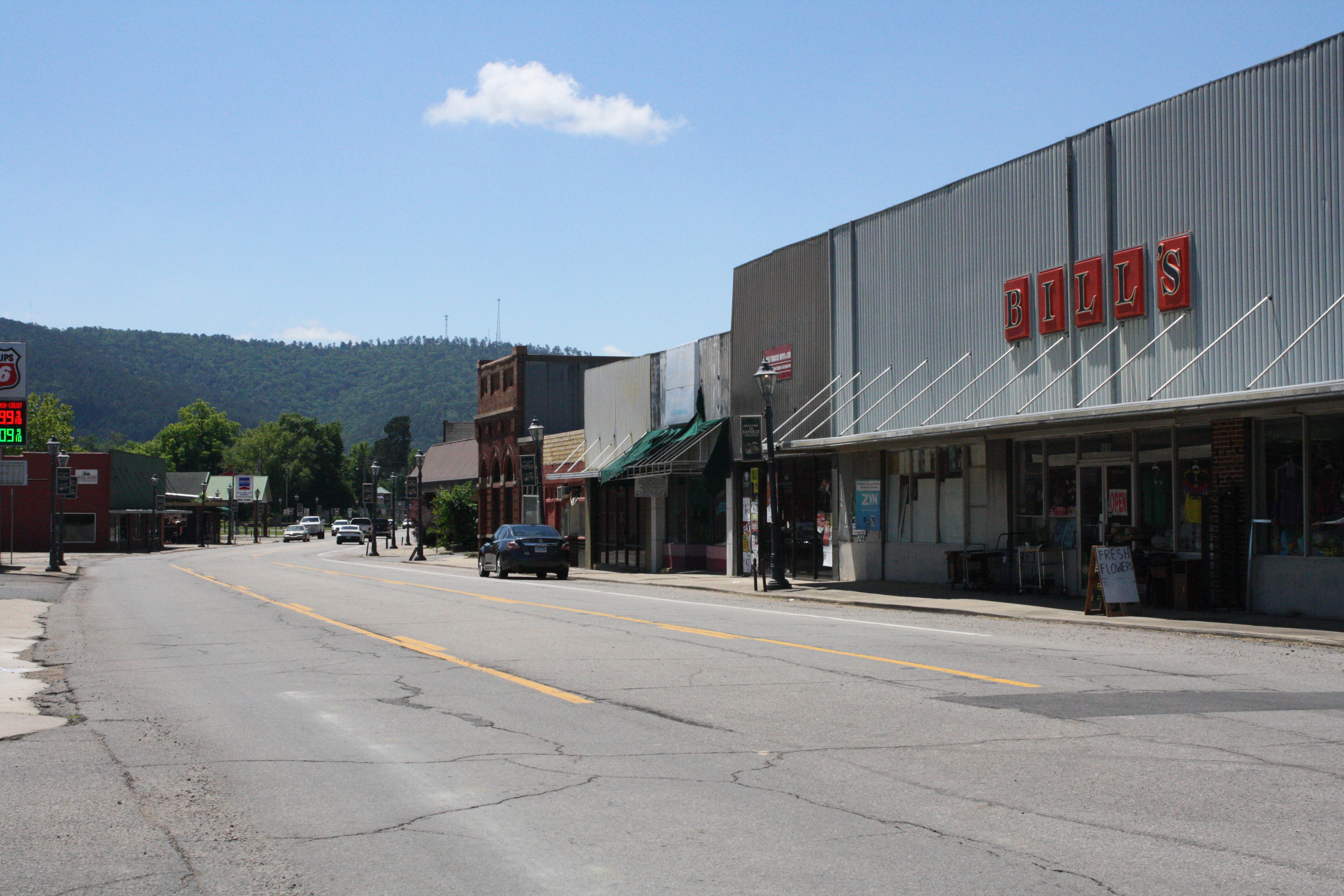
- The Yell County Courthouse in Danville Streetside in downtown Danville

- Location of Danville in Yell County, Arkansas.
- Coordinates: 35°3′13″N 93°23′30″W
- Country: United States
- State: Arkansas
- County: Yell

Government
  - Type: Mayor-council government
  - Mayor: Bill Gilkey
  - City Maer: Heath Tate
  - Public Works Director: Anthony Adcock
  - Water Superintendent: Case Terry

Area
  - Total: 4.33 sq mi (11.21 km^{2})
  - Land: 4.28 sq mi (11.09 km^{2})
  - Water: 0.046 sq mi (0.12 km^{2})
- Elevation: 348 ft (106 m)

Population (2020)
  - Total: 2,028
  - Estimate (2025): 1,961 ▼
  - Density: 473.8/sq mi (182.95/km^{2})
- Time zone: UTC-6 (Central (CST))
  - Summer (DST): UTC-5 (CDT)
- ZIP code: 72833
- Area code: 479
- FIPS code: 05-17320
- GNIS feature ID: 0081853
- Website: danvillear.gov

Danville is a city in Yell County, Arkansas, United States. The population was 2,028 at the 2020 census. Along with Dardanelle, it is one of two county seats for Yell County.

Danville is part of the Russellville Micropolitan Statistical Area.

== Geography ==
According to the United States Census Bureau, the city has a total area of 4.3 square miles (11 km^{2}), of which 4.2 square miles (11 km^{2}) is land and 0.1-square-mile (0.26 km^{2}) (1.40%) is water.

== History ==
After Yell County was created in 1840, local commissioners met to select a site for the county seat, settling on what is now Danville as the best location. The city was laid out in December 1841 by James Briggs, James Williams, and Nerick Morse. The home of William Peevy in Monrovia, a few miles north of Danville, was used as a temporary county seat in the interim. The city was named after the steamboat Danville, which plied the Petit Jean River in the 1840s. A log courthouse was constructed at Danville in 1844, though this was replaced by a frame building by 1850. A Masonic lodge was organized in Danville in the late 1840s. The number of creeks in the area led to the construction of numerous water power mills around Danville.

== Industry ==
The primary industry/employer is poultry farming and processing, along with other forms of agriculture.

Danville is home to a municipal airport, Danville Municipal Airport, with a 0.85-mile-long (4,466 ft) runway. The airport is home to 10 aircraft and averages 67 flights a week. The airport includes amenities such as 24/7 self-fuel service, private hangars, and a pilot's lounge.

The small town is also the hometown of Chambers Bank that has locations all across western Arkansas.

== Demographics ==
Historical population
Census	Pop.	Note	%±
1880	200		—
1900	600		—
1910	803		33.8%
1920	833		3.7%
1930	761		−8.6%
1940	1,010		32.7%
1950	829		−17.9%
1960	955		15.2%
1970	1,362		42.6%
1980	1,698		24.7%
1990	1,585		−6.7%
2000	2,392		50.9%
2010	2,409		0.7%
2020	2,028		−15.8%
2025 (est.)	1,961	▼	−3.3%
U.S. Decennial Census; 2014 Estimate

=== 2020 census ===
Danville racial composition
Race	Number	Percentage
White (non-Hispanic)	858	42.31%
Black or African American (non-Hispanic)	16	0.79%
Native American	11	0.54%
Asian	22	1.08%
Pacific Islander	2	0.1%
Other/Mixed	51	2.51%
Hispanic or Latino	1,068	52.66%

As of the 2020 census, Danville had a population of 2,028. The median age was 34.4 years. 27.0% of residents were under the age of 18 and 15.2% of residents were 65 years of age or older. For every 100 females there were 98.0 males, and for every 100 females age 18 and over there were 98.5 males age 18 and over.

0.0% of residents lived in urban areas, while 100.0% lived in rural areas.

There were 688 households and 501 families in Danville, of which 38.1% had children under the age of 18 living in them. Of all households, 39.7% were married-couple households, 23.7% were households with a male householder and no spouse or partner present, and 27.0% were households with a female householder and no spouse or partner present. About 27.1% of all households were made up of individuals and 10.5% had someone living alone who was 65 years of age or older.

There were 857 housing units, of which 19.7% were vacant. The homeowner vacancy rate was 4.1% and the rental vacancy rate was 12.1%.

=== 2010 census ===
As of the 2010 census Danville had a population of 2,409. The ethnic and racial composition of the population was 52.6% Hispanic or Latino, 42.1% non-Hispanic white, 2.1% African-American, 0.6% Native American, 1.5% Asian (all not from the generally delineated sub-groups) and 3.1% reporting two or more races.

=== 2000 census ===
As of the census of 2000, there were 2,392 people, 716 households, and 499 families residing in the city. The population density was 565.6 inhabitants per square mile (218.4/km^{2}). There were 792 housing units at an average density of 187.3 per square mile (72.3/km^{2}). The racial makeup of the city was 65.22% White, 1.84% Black or African American, 0.59% Native American, 1.30% Asian, 29.35% from other races, and 1.71% from two or more races. 43.48% of the population were Hispanic or Latino of any race.

There were 716 households, out of which 35.9% had children under the age of 18 living with them, 50.1% were married couples living together, 12.4% had a female householder with no husband present, and 30.3% were non-families. 23.6% of all households were made up of individuals, and 13.7% had someone living alone who was 65 years of age or older. The average household size was 3.01 and the average family size was 3.44.

In the city, the population was spread out, with 26.3% under the age of 18, 13.8% from 18 to 24, 29.4% from 25 to 44, 15.9% from 45 to 64, and 14.6% who were 65 years of age or older. The median age was 30 years. For every 100 females, there were 109.1 males. For every 100 females age 18 and over, there were 106.2 males.

The median income for a household in the city was $26,506, and the median income for a family was $29,185. Males had a median income of $17,122 versus $16,604 for females. The per capita income for the city was $12,533. About 17.5% of families and 21.2% of the population were below the poverty line, including 26.9% of those under age 18 and 9.5% of those age 65 or over.

== Education ==
Public education for elementary and secondary school students is available from the Danville School District, which leads to graduation from Danville High School. The district and high school's mascot and athletic emblem is the Little Johns.

== Notable people ==
- Lloyd R. George, former Danville Mayor, also served in the Arkansas House of Representatives
- Alfred Surratt, born in Danville, was an American baseball outfielder for the Kansas City Monarchs from 1947 until 1952.

== See also ==
- KYEL
