= Almyra, Arkansas =

- Town
- Location of Almyra in Arkansas County, Arkansas.
- Coordinates: 34°24′20″N 91°24′39″W
- Country: United States
- State: Arkansas
- County: Arkansas

Area
  - Total: 0.39 sq mi (1.00 km^{2})
  - Land: 0.39 sq mi (1.00 km^{2})
  - Water: 0 sq mi (0.00 km^{2})
- Elevation: 203 ft (62 m)

Population (2020)
  - Total: 256
  - Estimate (2025): 237 ▼
  - Density: 660.4/sq mi (254.99/km^{2})
- Time zone: UTC-6 (Central (CST))
  - Summer (DST): UTC-5 (CDT)
- ZIP code: 72003
- Area code: 870
- FIPS code: 05-01030
- GNIS feature ID: 2405140

Almyra is a town in Arkansas County, Arkansas, United States. The population was 256 at the 2020 census.

== Geography ==
According to the United States Census Bureau, the town has a total area of 0.39 square miles (1.0 km^{2}), all land.

=== Climate ===
The climate in this area is characterized by hot, humid summers and generally mild to cool winters. According to the Köppen Climate Classification system, Almyra has a humid subtropical climate, abbreviated "Cfa" on climate maps.

== Demographics ==
Historical population
Census	Pop.	Note	%±
1910	252		—
1920	323		28.2%
1930	287		−11.1%
1940	233		−18.8%
1950	235		0.9%
1960	240		2.1%
1970	220		−8.3%
1980	294		33.6%
1990	311		5.8%
2000	319		2.6%
2010	283		−11.3%
2020	256		−9.5%
2025 (est.)	237	▼	−7.4%
U.S. Decennial Census

As of the census of 2000, there were 319 people, 124 households, and 93 families residing in the town. The population density was 315.8 people/km^{2} (818 people/mi^{2}). There were 138 housing units at an average density of 136.6 units/km^{2} (354 units/mi^{2}). The racial makeup of the town was 98.12% White and 1.88% Black or African American.

There were 124 households, out of which 33.9% had children under the age of 18 living with them, 66.9% were married couples living together, 5.6% had a female householder with no husband present, and 25.0% were non-families. 21.0% of all households were made up of individuals, and 8.9% had someone living alone who was 65 years of age or older. The average household size was 2.57 and the average family size was 2.95.

In the town, the population was spread out, with 22.6% under the age of 18, 10.7% from 18 to 24, 31.0% from 25 to 44, 23.8% from 45 to 64, and 11.9% who were 65 years of age or older. The median age was 36 years. For every 100 females, there were 109.9 males. For every 100 females age 18 and over, there were 105.8 males.

The median income for a household in the town was $33,125, and the median income for a family was $39,688. Males had a median income of $28,571 versus $20,938 for females. The per capita income for the town was $19,729. About 10.8% of families and 10.6% of the population were below the poverty line, including 11.1% of those under age 18 and 7.8% of those age 65 or over.

== Education ==
It is within the DeWitt School District, which operates DeWitt High School.

== Transportation ==
Almyra Municipal Airport is a city-owned, public-use airport located three nautical miles (6 km) west of the central business district of Almyra.
