= Carlisle Municipal Airport =

Airport in Arkansas, United States

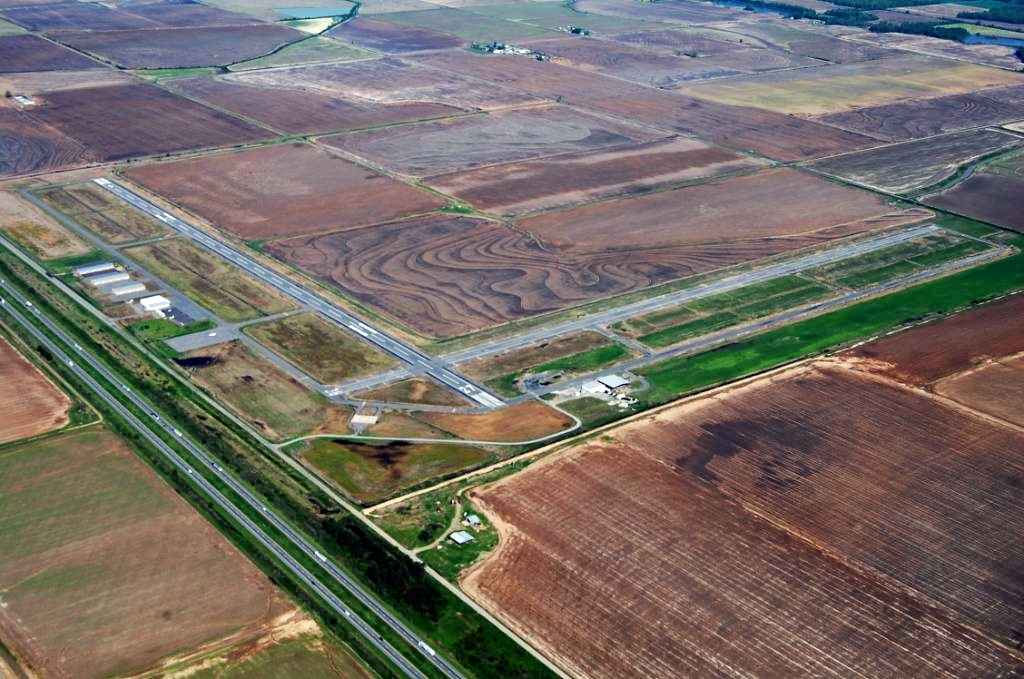
- IATA: none; ICAO: none; FAA LID: 4M3

Summary
- Airport type: Public
- Owner: City of Carlisle
- Serves: Carlisle, Arkansas
- Elevation AMSL: 241 ft (73 m)
- Coordinates: 34°48′30″N 091°42′44″W
- Website: www.CarlisleAR.org/...

Map
- Location of airport in Arkansas 4M3 (the United States)

Runways
Direction	Length		Surface
Direction	ft	m	Surface
9/27	4,501	1,372	Asphalt
18/36	4,494	1,370	Asphalt

Statistics (2011)
- Aircraft operations: 48,100
- Based aircraft: 14
- Source: Federal Aviation Administration

Carlisle Municipal Airport (FAA LID: 4M3) is a city-owned, public-use airport located two nautical miles (4 km) northeast of the central business district of Carlisle, a city in Lonoke County, Arkansas, United States. It is included in the National Plan of Integrated Airport Systems for 2011–2015, which categorized it as a general aviation facility.

== Facilities and aircraft ==
Carlisle Municipal Airport covers an area of 640 acres (259 ha) at an elevation of 241 feet (73 m) above mean sea level. It has two runways with asphalt surfaces: 9/27 is 4,501 by 75 feet (1,372 x 23 m) and 18/36 is 4,494 by 60 feet (1,370 x 18 m).

For the 12-month period ending March 31, 2011, the airport had 48,100 aircraft operations, an average of 131 per day: 99.8% general aviation and 0.2% military. At that time there were 14 aircraft based at this airport: 93% single-engine and 7% multi-engine.

== History ==
The airport was built by the United States Army Air Forces during 1942/43 as an axillary airfield for Stuttgart Army Airfield, near Stuttgart, Arkansas. It was known simply as Stuttgart Army Airfield Auxiliary #1. The runways in use today were built during that period. It was used to help train medium bomber and transport pilots, who used it for emergencies on it or practiced touch-and-go landings. It was not staffed, and at the end of World War II it was simply abandoned and the land turned over to local authorities, like many other small auxiliary airfields.

The City of Carlisle developed the current airport from the former military airfield.

== See also ==
- List of airports in Arkansas
