= Booneville Municipal Airport =

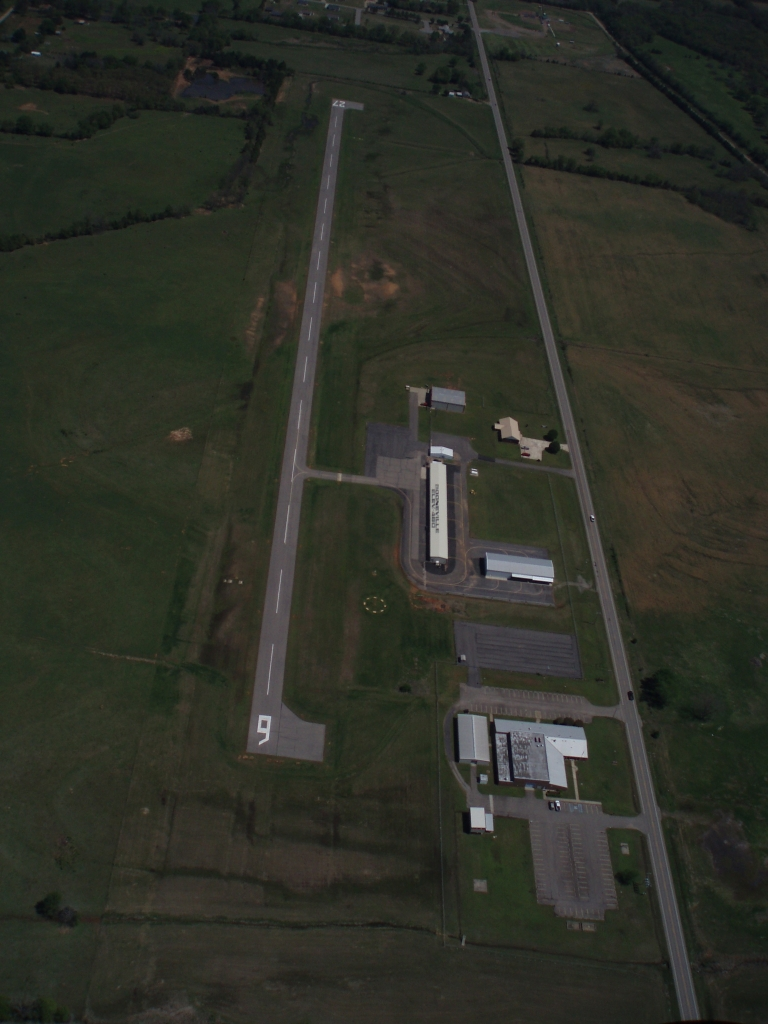
- IATA: none; ICAO: none; FAA LID: 4M2

Summary
- Airport type: Public
- Owner: City of Booneville
- Serves: Booneville, Arkansas
- Elevation AMSL: 465 ft (142 m)
- Coordinates: 35°08′58″N 093°51′44″W
- Website: BoonevilleAirport.com

Map
- Location of airport in Arkansas

Runways
Direction	Length		Surface
Direction	ft	m	Surface
9/27	3,254	992	Asphalt

Statistics (2010)
- Aircraft operations: 5,000
- Based aircraft: 17
- Source: Federal Aviation Administration

Booneville Municipal Airport (FAA LID: 4M2) is a city-owned, public-use airport located three nautical miles (6 km) east of the central business district of Booneville, a city in Logan County, Arkansas, United States.

== Facilities and aircraft ==
Booneville Municipal Airport covers an area of 200 acres (81 ha) at an elevation of 465 feet (142 m) above mean sea level. It has one runway designated 9/27 with an asphalt surface measuring 3,254 by 50 feet (992 x 15 m).

For the 12-month period ending December 31, 2010, the airport had 5,000 general aviation aircraft operations, an average of 13 per day. At that time there were 17 aircraft based at this airport: 94% single-engine and 6% ultralight.

== See also ==
- List of airports in Arkansas
