= Boonville Airport (California) =

- IATA: none; ICAO: none; FAA LID: D83

Summary
- Airport type: Anderson Valley Community Services District
- Operator: Boonville, California
- Location: 371
- Elevation AMSL: 113.1 ft (34.5 m)
- Coordinates: 39°00′46″N 123°22′58″W
- Interactive map of Boonville Airport

Runways
Direction	Length		Surface
Direction	ft	m	Surface
13/31	3,240	988	Asphalt

Boonville Airport (FAA LID: D83), formerly Q17, is a public airport located one mile (1.6 km) northwest of the central business district (CBD) of Boonville, a town in Anderson Valley in Mendocino County, California, United States. It is mostly used for general aviation.

== Facilities ==
Boonville Airport covers 35 acres (140,000 m^{2}) and has one runway:

- Runway 13/31: 3,240 x 50 ft (988 x 15 m), surface: asphalt
