= List of airports by ICAO code: KA-KH =

List of airports by ICAO code: A - B - C - D - EB-EG - EH-EY - FA-FM - FN-FZ - G - H - ~~I~~ - J - KA-KH - KI-KP - KR-KZ - LA-LJ - LK-LZ - M - N - O - P - Q - R - SA-SC - SD-SH - SI - SJ - SK-SM - SN-SP - SQ - SS-SU - SV-SY - T - U - V - W - ~~X~~ - YA-YG - YH-YQ - YR-YZ - Z

== KA ==
ICAO	IATA	Airport name	Community	State	Coordinates	Notes
KAAA		Logan County Airport	Lincoln	Illinois	40°09′31″N 089°20′06″W	
KAAF	AAF	Apalachicola Regional Airport	Apalachicola	Florida	29°43′39″N 085°01′39″W	
KAAO		Colonel James Jabara Airport	Wichita	Kansas	37°44′51″N 097°13′16″W	
KAAP		Andrau Airpark	Houston	Texas	29°43′00″N 095°35′00″W	Closed
KAAS		Taylor County Airport	Campbellsville	Kentucky	37°21′30″N 085°18′34″W	
KAAT		Alturas Municipal Airport	Alturas	California	41°28′59″N 120°33′55″W	
KABE	ABE	Lehigh Valley International Airport	Allentown, Bethlehem and Easton	Pennsylvania	40°39′08″N 075°26′26″W	
KABI	ABI	Abilene Regional Airport	Abilene	Texas	32°24′48″N 099°40′59″W	
KABQ	ABQ	Albuquerque International Sunport	Albuquerque	New Mexico	35°02′22″N 106°36′39″W	
KABR	ABR	Aberdeen Regional Airport	Aberdeen	South Dakota	45°26′54″N 098°25′22″W	
KABY	ABY	Southwest Georgia Regional Airport	Albany	Georgia	31°32′08″N 084°11′40″W	
KACB	ACB	Antrim County Airport	Bellaire	Michigan	44°59′19″N 085°11′54″W	
KACJ		Jimmy Carter Regional Airport (formerly Souther Field)	Americus	Georgia	32°06′39″N 084°11′20″W	
KACK	ACK	Nantucket Memorial Airport	Nantucket	Massachusetts	41°15′10″N 070°03′32″W	
KACP		Allen Parish Airport	Oakdale	Louisiana	30°45′02″N 092°41′19″W	
KACQ		Waseca Municipal Airport	Waseca	Minnesota	44°04′24″N 093°33′11″W	
KACT	ACT	Waco Regional Airport	Waco	Texas	31°36′41″N 097°13′50″W	
KACV	ACV	Arcata-Eureka Airport	Arcata	California	40°58′40″N 124°06′30″W	
KACY	ACY	Atlantic City International Airport	Atlantic City	New Jersey	39°27′27″N 074°34′38″W	
KACZ		Henderson Field	Wallace	North Carolina	34°43′04″N 078°00′13″W	
KADC		Wadena Municipal Airport	Wadena	Minnesota	46°27′01″N 095°12′39″W	
KADF		Dexter B. Florence Memorial Field	Arkadelphia	Arkansas	34°05′59″N 093°03′58″W	
KADG	ADG	Lenawee County Airport	Adrian	Michigan	41°52′04″N 084°04′38″W	
KADH	ADT	Ada Municipal Airport	Ada	Oklahoma	34°48′16″N 096°40′17″W	
KADM	ADM	Ardmore Municipal Airport	Ardmore	Oklahoma	34°18′15″N 097°01′14″W	
KADS	ADS	Addison Airport	Addison	Texas	32°58′07″N 096°50′11″W	
KADT		Atwood–Rawlins County City–County Airport	Atwood	Kansas	39°50′24″N 101°02′31″W	
KADU		Audubon County Airport	Audubon	Iowa	41°42′05″N 094°55′14″W	
KADW	ADW	Andrews Air Force Base	Camp Springs	Maryland	38°48′39″N 076°52′01″W	
KAEG		Double Eagle II Airport	Albuquerque	New Mexico	35°08′43″N 106°47′43″W	
KAEJ		Central Colorado Regional Airport	Buena Vista	Colorado	38°48′52″N 106°07′14″W	
KAEL	AEL	Albert Lea Municipal Airport	Albert Lea	Minnesota	43°40′52″N 093°22′05″W	
KAEX	AEX	Alexandria International Airport	Alexandria	Louisiana	31°19′39″N 092°32′55″W	
KAFF	AFF	United States Air Force Academy Airfield	Colorado Springs	Colorado	38°58′21″N 104°49′16″W	
KAFJ	WSG	Washington County Airport	Washington	Pennsylvania	40°08′11″N 080°17′25″W	
KAFK		Nebraska City Municipal Airport	Nebraska City	Nebraska	40°36′20″N 095°52′04″W	
KAFN	AFN	Jaffrey Airport–Silver Ranch	Jaffrey	New Hampshire	42°48′18″N 072°00′11″W	
KAFO	AFO	Afton Municipal Airport (Afton-Lincoln County Airport)	Afton	Wyoming	42°42′32″N 110°56′32″W	
KAFP		Anson County Airport	Wadesboro	North Carolina	35°01′14″N 080°04′38″W	
KAFW	AFW	Fort Worth Alliance Airport	Fort Worth	Texas	32°59′25″N 097°19′10″W	
KAGC	AGC	Allegheny County Airport	West Mifflin	Pennsylvania	40°21′15″N 079°55′48″W	
KAGO	AGO	Magnolia Municipal Airport	Magnolia	Arkansas	33°13′39″N 093°13′01″W	
KAGR		MacDill AFB Auxiliary Field	Avon Park	Florida	27°38′52″N 081°20′30″W	
KAGS	AGS	Augusta Regional Airport at Bush Field	Augusta	Georgia	33°22′12″N 081°57′52″W	
KAGZ		Wagner Municipal Airport	Wagner	South Dakota	43°03′51″N 098°17′34″W	
KAHC	AHC	Amedee Army Airfield	Herlong	California	40°15′57″N 120°09′02″W	
KAHH	AHH	Amery Municipal Airport	Amery	Wisconsin	45°16′52″N 092°22′31″W	
KAHN	AHN	Athens Ben Epps Airport	Athens	Georgia	33°56′55″N 083°19′35″W	
KAHQ		Wahoo Municipal Airport	Wahoo	Nebraska	41°14′26″N 096°35′40″W	
KAIA	AIA	Alliance Municipal Airport	Alliance	Nebraska	42°03′12″N 102°48′14″W	
KAIB		Hopkins-Montrose County Airport	Nucla	Colorado	38°14′21″N 108°33′48″W	
KAID	AID	Anderson Municipal Airport (Darlington Field)	Anderson	Indiana	40°06′31″N 085°36′47″W	
KAIG		Langlade County Airport	Antigo	Wisconsin	45°09′14″N 089°06′38″W	
KAIK	AIK	Aiken Regional Airport	Aiken	South Carolina	33°38′58″N 081°41′06″W	
KAIO	AIO	Atlantic Municipal Airport	Atlantic	Iowa	41°24′26″N 095°02′49″W	
KAIT		Aitkin Municipal Airport (Steve Kurtz Field)	Aitkin	Minnesota	46°32′54″N 093°40′36″W	
KAIV	AIV	George Downer Airport	Aliceville	Alabama	33°06′23″N 088°11′52″W	
KAIY	AIY	Atlantic City Municipal Airport (Bader Field)	Atlantic City	New Jersey	39°21′36″N 074°27′22″W	Closed 2006
KAIZ	AIZ	Lee C. Fine Memorial Airport	Lake Ozark	Missouri	38°05′46″N 092°32′58″W	
KAJG		Mount Carmel Municipal Airport	Mount Carmel	Illinois	38°36′20″N 087°43′34″W	
KAJO		Corona Municipal Airport	Corona	California	33°53′52″N 117°36′09″W	
KAJR		Habersham County Airport	Cornelia	Georgia	34°29′59″N 083°33′24″W	
KAJZ		Blake Field	Delta	Colorado	38°47′11″N 108°03′49″W	
KAKH		Gastonia Municipal Airport	Gastonia	North Carolina	35°12′10″N 081°08′59″W	
KAKO	AKO	Colorado Plains Regional Airport	Akron	Colorado	40°10′32″N 103°13′19″W	
KAKQ		Wakefield Municipal Airport	Wakefield	Virginia	36°59′14″N 077°00′04″W	
KAKR	AKC	Akron Fulton Executive Airport	Akron	Ohio	41°02′15″N 081°28′03″W	
KALB	ALB	Albany International Airport	Albany	New York	42°44′57″N 073°48′07″W	
KALI	ALI	Alice International Airport	Alice	Texas	27°44′27″N 098°01′37″W	
KALM	ALM	Alamogordo–White Sands Regional Airport	Alamogordo	New Mexico	32°50′24″N 105°59′26″W	
KALN	ALN	St. Louis Regional Airport	Alton	Illinois	38°53′25″N 090°02′46″W	
KALO	ALO	Waterloo Regional Airport	Waterloo	Iowa	42°33′25″N 092°24′01″W	
KALS	ALS	San Luis Valley Regional Airport	Alamosa	Colorado	37°26′06″N 105°51′59″W	
KALW	ALW	Walla Walla Regional Airport	Walla Walla	Washington	46°05′24″N 118°17′24″W	
KALX	ALX	Thomas C. Russell Field	Alexander City	Alabama	32°54′53″N 085°57′47″W	
KAMA	AMA	Rick Husband Amarillo International Airport	Amarillo	Texas	35°13′10″N 101°42′21″W	
KAMG		Bacon County Airport	Alma	Georgia	31°32′10″N 082°30′24″W	
KAMN	AMN	Gratiot Community Airport	Alma	Michigan	43°19′20″N 084°41′17″W	
KAMT		Alexander Salamon Airport	West Union	Ohio	38°51′05″N 083°33′58″W	
KAMW	AMW	Ames Municipal Airport	Ames	Iowa	41°59′31″N 093°37′18″W	
KANB	ANB	Anniston Regional Airport	Anniston	Alabama	33°35′17″N 085°51′29″W	
KAND	AND	Anderson Regional Airport	Anderson	South Carolina	34°29′41″N 082°42′34″W	
KANE		Anoka County–Blaine Airport (Janes Field)	Minneapolis	Minnesota	45°08′42″N 093°12′37″W	
KANJ		Sault Ste. Marie Municipal Airport (Sanderson Field)	Sault Ste. Marie	Michigan	46°28′45″N 084°22′06″W	
KANK		Harriet Alexander Field	Salida	Colorado	38°32′18″N 106°02′55″W	
KANP	ANP	Lee Airport	Annapolis	Maryland	38°56′34″N 076°34′06″W	
KANQ	ANQ	Tri-State Steuben County Airport	Angola	Indiana	41°38′23″N 085°05′01″W	
KANW	ANW	Ainsworth Regional Airport	Ainsworth	Nebraska	42°34′45″N 099°59′35″W	
KANY	ANY	Anthony Municipal Airport	Anthony	Kansas	37°09′31″N 098°04′47″W	
KAOC		Arco Butte County Airport	Arco	Idaho	43°36′16″N 113°19′55″W	
KAOH	AOH	Lima Allen County Airport	Lima	Ohio	40°42′30″N 084°01′39″W	
KAOO	AOO	Altoona–Blair County Airport	Altoona	Pennsylvania	40°17′47″N 078°19′12″W	
KAOV		Ava Bill Martin Memorial Airport	Ava	Missouri	36°58′19″N 092°40′55″W	
KAPA	APA	Centennial Airport	Centennial	Colorado	39°34′12″N 104°50′58″W	
KAPC	APC	Napa County Airport (Napa Valley Airport)	Napa	California	38°12′48″N 122°16′51″W	
KAPF	APF	Naples Airport	Naples	Florida	26°09′09″N 081°46′32″W	
KAPG	APG	Phillips Army Airfield	Aberdeen Proving Ground	Maryland	39°27′58″N 076°10′08″W	
KAPH	APH	A.P. Hill Army Airfield	Fort Walker	Virginia	38°04′08″N 077°19′06″W	
KAPN	APN	Alpena County Regional Airport	Alpena	Michigan	45°04′41″N 083°33′37″W	
KAPS		Port of South Louisiana Executive Regional Airport	Reserve	Louisiana	30°05′15″N 090°34′58″W	
KAPT	APT	Marion County Airport (Brown Field)	Jasper	Tennessee	35°03′38″N 085°35′07″W	
KAPV	APV	Apple Valley Airport	Apple Valley	California	34°34′31″N 117°11′10″W	
KAPY		Zapata County Airport	Zapata	Texas	26°58′08″N 099°14′56″W	
KAQO		Llano Municipal Airport	Llano	Texas	30°47′01″N 098°39′43″W	
KAQP		Appleton Municipal Airport	Appleton	Minnesota	45°13′39″N 096°00′16″W	
KAQR		Atoka Municipal Airport	Atoka	Oklahoma	34°23′54″N 096°08′53″W	
KAQW		Harriman-and-West Airport	North Adams	Massachusetts	42°41′45″N 073°10′13″W	
KAQX		Allendale County Airport	Allendale	South Carolina	32°59′42″N 081°16′13″W	
KARA	ARA	Acadiana Regional Airport	New Iberia	Louisiana	30°02′16″N 091°53′02″W	
KARB	ARB	Ann Arbor Municipal Airport	Ann Arbor	Michigan	42°13′23″N 083°44′44″W	
KARG	ARG	Walnut Ridge Regional Airport	Walnut Ridge	Arkansas	36°07′29″N 090°55′30″W	
KARM	WHT	Wharton Regional Airport	Wharton	Texas	29°15′15″N 096°09′15″W	
KARR	AUZ	Aurora Municipal Airport (Chicago/Aurora Municipal Airport)	Aurora	Illinois	41°46′19″N 088°28′32″W	
KART	ART	Watertown International Airport	Watertown	New York	43°59′31″N 076°01′14″W	
KARV	ARV	Lakeland Airport (Noble F. Lee Memorial Field)	Minocqua / Woodruff	Wisconsin	45°55′40″N 089°43′51″W	
KARW	BFT	Beaufort County Airport (Frogmore Island Airport)	Beaufort County	South Carolina	32°24′44″N 080°38′04″W	
KASD		Slidell Airport	Slidell	Louisiana	30°20′47″N 089°49′15″W	
KASE	ASE	Aspen–Pitkin County Airport	Aspen	Colorado	39°13′23″N 106°52′08″W	
KASG	SPZ	Springdale Municipal Airport	Springdale	Arkansas	36°10′35″N 094°07′09″W	
KASH	ASH	Nashua Airport (Boire Field)	Nashua	New Hampshire	42°46′54″N 071°30′53″W	
KASJ		Tri-County Airport	Ahoskie	North Carolina	36°17′51″N 077°10′15″W	
KASL	ASL	Harrison County Airport	Marshall	Texas	32°31′14″N 094°18′28″W	
KASN	ASN	Talladega Municipal Airport	Talladega	Alabama	33°34′10″N 086°03′04″W	
KAST	AST	Astoria Regional Airport	Astoria	Oregon	46°09′29″N 123°52′43″W	
KASW		Warsaw Municipal Airport	Warsaw	Indiana	41°16′29″N 085°50′24″W	
KASX	ASX	John F. Kennedy Memorial Airport	Ashland	Wisconsin	46°32′55″N 090°55′08″W	
KASY	ASY	Ashley Municipal Airport	Ashley	North Dakota	46°01′29″N 099°21′06″W	
KATA		Hall–Miller Municipal Airport	Atlanta	Texas	33°06′08″N 094°11′44″W	
KATL	ATL	Hartsfield–Jackson Atlanta International Airport	Atlanta	Georgia	33°38′12″N 084°25′41″W	
KATS	ATS	Artesia Municipal Airport	Artesia	New Mexico	32°51′09″N 104°28′04″W	
KATW	ATW	Appleton International Airport	Greenville (near Appleton)	Wisconsin	44°15′29″N 088°31′09″W	
KATY	ATY	Watertown Regional Airport	Watertown	South Dakota	44°54′50″N 097°09′17″W	
KAUG	AUG	Augusta State Airport	Augusta	Maine	44°19′14″N 069°47′50″W	
KAUH		Aurora Municipal Airport (Al Potter Field)	Aurora	Nebraska	40°53′39″N 097°59′40″W	
KAUM	AUM	Austin Municipal Airport	Austin	Minnesota	43°39′45″N 092°55′58″W	
KAUN	AUN	Auburn Municipal Airport	Auburn	California	38°57′17″N 121°04′54″W	
KAUO	AUO	Auburn University Regional Airport (Robert G. Pitts Field)	Auburn	Alabama	32°36′54″N 085°26′02″W	
KAUS	AUS	Austin–Bergstrom International Airport	Austin	Texas	30°11′40″N 097°40′12″W	
KAUW	AUW	Wausau Downtown Airport	Wausau	Wisconsin	44°55′35″N 089°37′37″W	
KAVC		Mecklenburg-Brunswick Regional Airport	South Hill	Virginia	36°41′18″N 078°03′16″W	
KAVK		Alva Regional Airport	Alva	Oklahoma	36°46′25″N 098°40′13″W	
KAVL	AVL	Asheville Regional Airport	Fletcher	North Carolina	35°26′10″N 082°32′30″W	
KAVO	AVO	Avon Park Executive Airport	Avon Park	Florida	27°35′29″N 081°31′44″W	
KAVP	AVP	Wilkes-Barre/Scranton International Airport	Avoca	Pennsylvania	41°20′18″N 075°43′24″W	
KAVQ	AVW	Marana Regional Airport (Avra Valley Airport)	Marana	Arizona	32°24′34″N 111°13′06″W	
KAVX	AVX	Catalina Airport (Airport in the Sky)	Avalon / Santa Catalina Island	California	33°24′18″N 118°24′57″W	
KAWG		Washington Municipal Airport	Washington	Iowa	41°16′42″N 091°40′35″W	
KAWM	AWM	West Memphis Municipal Airport	West Memphis	Arkansas	35°08′06″N 090°14′04″W	
KAWO		Arlington Municipal Airport	Arlington	Washington	48°09′39″N 122°09′32″W	
KAXA	AXG	Algona Municipal Airport	Algona	Iowa	43°04′40″N 094°16′19″W	
KAXH		Houston Southwest Airport	Arcola	Texas	29°30′22″N 095°28′37″W	
KAXN	AXN	Alexandria Municipal Airport (Chandler Field)	Alexandria	Minnesota	45°51′59″N 095°23′41″W	
KAXQ		Clarion County Airport	Clarion	Pennsylvania	41°13′30″N 079°26′32″W	
KAXS	AXS	Altus/Quartz Mountain Regional Airport	Altus	Oklahoma	34°41′56″N 099°20′19″W	
KAXV	AXV	Neil Armstrong Airport (Auglaize County Airport)	Wapakoneta	Ohio	40°29′37″N 084°17′53″W	
KAXX	AXX	Angel Fire Airport	Angel Fire	New Mexico	36°25′19″N 105°17′24″W	
KAYS	AYS	Waycross–Ware County Airport	Waycross	Georgia	31°14′57″N 082°23′44″W	
KAYX		Arnold Air Force Base	Tullahoma	Tennessee	35°23′33″N 086°05′09″W	
KAZC		Colorado City Municipal Airport	Colorado City	Arizona	36°57′36″N 113°00′50″W	
KAZE		Hazlehurst Airport	Hazlehurst	Georgia	31°53′07″N 082°38′53″W	
KAZO	AZO	Kalamazoo/Battle Creek International Airport	Kalamazoo / Battle Creek	Michigan	42°14′06″N 085°33′07″W	
KAZU		Arrowhead Assault Strip	Fort Chaffee	Arkansas	35°16′41″N 094°13′28″W	

== KB ==
ICAO	IATA	Airport name	Community	State	Coordinates	Notes
KBAB	BAB	Beale Air Force Base	Marysville	California	39°08′10″N 121°26′11″W	
KBAC		Barnes County Municipal Airport	Valley City	North Dakota	46°56′31″N 098°01′06″W	
KBAD	BAD	Barksdale Air Force Base	Bossier City	Louisiana	32°30′07″N 093°39′46″W	
KBAF	BAF	Westfield-Barnes Regional Airport	Westfield / Springfield	Massachusetts	42°09′29″N 072°42′57″W	
KBAK	CLU	Columbus Municipal Airport	Columbus	Indiana	39°15′43″N 085°53′47″W	
KBAM	BAM	Battle Mountain Airport (Lander County Airport)	Battle Mountain	Nevada	40°35′59″N 116°52′34″W	
KBAN		Bryant Field	Bridgeport	California	38°15′45″N 119°13′33″W	
KBAX		Huron County Memorial Airport	Bad Axe	Michigan	43°46′49″N 082°59′08″W	
KBAZ		New Braunfels Regional Airport	New Braunfels	Texas	29°42′11″N 098°02′28″W	
KBBB	BBB	Benson Municipal Airport	Benson	Minnesota	45°19′55″N 095°39′02″W	
KBBD		Curtis Field	Brady	Texas	31°10′45″N 099°19′26″W	
KBBG	BKG	Branson Airport	Branson	Missouri	36°31′55″N 093°12′02″W	
KBBP	BTN	Marlboro County Jetport (H.E. Avent Field)	Bennettsville	South Carolina	34°37′18″N 079°44′04″W	
KBBW	BBW	Broken Bow Municipal Airport (Keith Glaze Field)	Broken Bow	Nebraska	41°26′11″N 099°38′32″W	
KBCB	BCB	VirginiaTech/Montgomery Executive Airport	Blacksburg	Virginia	37°12′28″N 080°24′28″W	
KBCE	BCE	Bryce Canyon Airport	Bryce Canyon	Utah	37°42′23″N 112°08′42″W	
KBCK		Black River Falls Area Airport	Black River Falls	Wisconsin	44°15′03″N 090°51′19″W	
KBCR		Tri-County Airport	Bonifay	Florida	30°50′38″N 085°36′06″W	
KBCT	BCT	Boca Raton Airport	Boca Raton	Florida	26°22′43″N 080°06′28″W	
KBDE	BDE	Baudette International Airport	Baudette	Minnesota	48°43′42″N 094°36′44″W	
KBDG	BDG	Blanding Municipal Airport	Blanding	Utah	37°35′00″N 109°29′00″W	
KBDH	ILL	Willmar Municipal Airport (John L. Rice Field)	Willmar	Minnesota	45°07′04″N 095°07′50″W	
KBDJ		Boulder Junction Airport	Boulder Junction	Wisconsin	46°08′13″N 089°38′51″W	
KBDL	BDL	Bradley International Airport	Windsor Locks / Hartford	Connecticut	41°56′21″N 072°41′00″W	
KBDN		Bend Municipal Airport	Bend	Oregon	44°05′40″N 121°12′00″W	
KBDQ		Morrilton Municipal Airport	Morrilton	Arkansas	35°08′10″N 092°42′49″W	
KBDR	BDR	Igor I. Sikorsky Memorial Airport	Bridgeport	Connecticut	41°09′48″N 073°07′34″W	
KBDU		Boulder Municipal Airport	Boulder	Colorado	40°02′22″N 105°13′33″W	
KBEA	BEA	Beeville Municipal Airport	Beeville	Texas	28°21′52″N 097°39′35″W	
KBEC	BEC	Beech Factory Airport	Wichita	Kansas	37°41′40″N 097°12′54″W	
KBED	BED	Laurence G. Hanscom Field	Bedford	Massachusetts	42°28′12″N 071°17′20″W	
KBEH	BEH	Southwest Michigan Regional Airport	Benton Harbor	Michigan	42°07′43″N 086°25′34″W	
KBFA		Boyne Mountain Airport	Boyne Falls	Michigan	45°09′57″N 084°55′27″W	
KBFD	BFD	Bradford Regional Airport	Bradford	Pennsylvania	41°48′11″N 078°38′24″W	
KBFE		Terry County Airport	Brownfield	Texas	33°10′28″N 102°11′31″W	
KBFF	BFF	Western Nebraska Regional Airport (William B. Heilig Field)	Scottsbluff	Nebraska	41°52′26″N 103°35′44″W	
KBFI	BFI	Boeing Field/King County International Airport	Seattle	Washington	47°31′48″N 122°18′07″W	
KBFK		Buffalo Municipal Airport	Buffalo	Oklahoma	36°51′48″N 099°37′07″W	
KBFL	BFL	Meadows Field Airport	Bakersfield	California	35°26′02″N 119°03′28″W	
KBFM	BFM	Mobile Downtown Airport	Mobile	Alabama	30°37′36″N 088°04′05″W	
KBFR	BFR	Virgil I. Grissom Municipal Airport	Bedford	Indiana	38°50′24″N 086°26′43″W	
KBFW		Silver Bay Municipal Airport	Silver Bay	Minnesota	47°14′55″N 091°24′56″W	Closed 2018
KBFZ		Albertville Regional Airport	Albertville	Alabama	34°13′45″N 086°15′21″W	
KBGD		Hutchinson County Airport	Borger	Texas	35°42′03″N 101°23′37″W	
KBGE	BGE	Decatur County Industrial Air Park	Bainbridge	Georgia	30°58′18″N 084°38′15″W	
KBGF		Winchester Municipal Airport	Winchester	Tennessee	35°10′39″N 086°03′58″W	
KBGM	BGM	Greater Binghamton Airport	Binghamton	New York	42°12′31″N 075°58′47″W	
KBGR	BGR	Bangor International Airport	Bangor	Maine	44°48′26″N 068°49′41″W	
KBHB	BHB	Hancock County-Bar Harbor Airport	Bar Harbor	Maine	44°26′59″N 068°21′42″W	
KBHC		Baxley Municipal Airport	Baxley	Georgia	31°42′51″N 082°23′30″W	
KBHK		Baker Municipal Airport	Baker	Montana	46°20′52″N 104°15′34″W	
KBHM	BHM	Birmingham-Shuttlesworth International Airport	Birmingham	Alabama	33°33′50″N 086°45′08″W	
KBID	BID	Block Island State Airport	Block Island	Rhode Island	41°10′05″N 071°34′40″W	
KBIE		Beatrice Municipal Airport	Beatrice	Nebraska	40°18′04″N 096°45′14″W	
KBIF	BIF	Biggs Army Airfield	Fort Bliss, El Paso	Texas	31°50′56″N 106°22′01″W	
KBIH	BIH	Eastern Sierra Regional Airport	Bishop	California	37°22′23″N 118°21′49″W	
KBIJ		Early County Airport	Blakely	Georgia	31°23′51″N 084°53′41″W	
KBIL	BIL	Billings Logan International Airport	Billings	Montana	45°48′28″N 108°32′34″W	
KBIS	BIS	Bismarck Municipal Airport	Bismarck	North Dakota	46°46′22″N 100°44′45″W	
KBIV	BIV	West Michigan Regional Airport	Holland	Michigan	42°44′34″N 086°06′28″W	
KBIX	BIX	Keesler Air Force Base	Biloxi	Mississippi	30°24′41″N 088°55′25″W	
KBJC	BJC	Rocky Mountain Metropolitan Airport	Denver	Colorado	39°54′32″N 105°07′02″W	
KBJI	BJI	Bemidji Regional Airport	Bemidji	Minnesota	47°30′39″N 094°56′05″W	
KBJJ	BJJ	Wayne County Airport	Wooster	Ohio	40°52′29″N 081°53′18″W	
KBJN		Tonopah Test Range Airport	Tonopah	Nevada	37°47′41″N 116°46′43″W	
KBKD		Stephens County Airport	Breckenridge	Texas	32°43′06″N 098°53′31″W	
KBKE	BKE	Baker City Municipal Airport	Baker City	Oregon	44°50′14″N 117°48′33″W	
KBKF		Buckley Space Force Base	Aurora	Colorado	39°42′06″N 104°45′06″W	
KBKL	BKL	Cleveland Burke Lakefront Airport	Cleveland	Ohio	41°31′03″N 081°41′00″W	
KBKN		Blackwell-Tonkawa Municipal Airport	Blackwell	Oklahoma	36°44′42″N 097°20′58″W	
KBKS		Brooks County Airport	Falfurrias	Texas	27°12′23″N 098°07′21″W	
KBKT	BKT	Allen C. Perkinson Airport / Blackstone Army Airfield	Blackstone	Virginia	37°04′26″N 077°57′09″W	
KBKV		Brooksville-Tampa Bay Regional Airport	Brooksville	Florida	28°28′25″N 082°27′20″W	
KBKW	BKW	Raleigh County Memorial Airport	Beckley	West Virginia	37°47′14″N 081°07′27″W	
KBKX	BKX	Brookings Municipal Airport	Brookings	South Dakota	44°18′17″N 096°49′01″W	
KBLF	BLF	Mercer County Airport	Bluefield	West Virginia	37°17′45″N 081°12′28″W	
KBLH	BLH	Blythe Airport	Blythe	California	33°36′53″N 114°42′48″W	
KBLI	BLI	Bellingham International Airport	Bellingham	Washington	48°47′33″N 122°32′15″W	
KBLM	BLM	Monmouth Executive Airport	Belmar / Farmingdale	New Jersey	40°11′12″N 074°07′28″W	
KBLU		Blue Canyon-Nyack Airport	Emigrant Gap	California	39°16′30″N 120°42′35″W	
KBLV	BLV	MidAmerica St. Louis Airport / Scott Air Force Base	Belleville	Illinois	38°32′43″N 089°50′07″W	
KBMC	BMC	Brigham City Airport	Brigham City	Utah	41°33′09″N 112°03′44″W	
KBMG	BMG	Monroe County Airport	Bloomington	Indiana	39°08′46″N 086°37′00″W	
KBMI	BMI	Central Illinois Regional Airport	Bloomington	Illinois	40°28′38″N 088°54′57″W	
KBML	BML	Berlin Regional Airport	Berlin	New Hampshire	44°34′31″N 071°10′33″W	
KBMQ		Burnet Municipal Airport (Kate Craddock Field)	Burnet	Texas	30°44′20″N 098°14′19″W	
KBMT	BMT	Beaumont Municipal Airport	Beaumont	Texas	30°04′13″N 094°12′54″W	
KBNA	BNA	Nashville International Airport	Nashville	Tennessee	36°07′36″N 086°40′55″W	
KBNG	BNG	Banning Municipal Airport	Banning	California	33°55′21″N 116°51′02″W	
KBNL		Barnwell Regional Airport	Barnwell	South Carolina	33°15′28″N 081°23′18″W	
KBNO	BNO	Burns Municipal Airport	Burns	Oregon	43°35′31″N 118°57′20″W	
KBNW		Boone Municipal Airport	Boone	Iowa	42°02′58″N 093°50′51″W	
KBOF		Joint Base Anacostia-Bolling	Washington	District of Columbia	38°50′42″N 077°00′52″W	
KBOI	BOI	Boise Air Terminal (Gowen Field)	Boise	Idaho	43°33′52″N 116°13′22″W	
KBOK		Brookings Airport	Brookings	Oregon	42°04′28″N 124°17′24″W	
KBOS	BOS	Logan International Airport	Boston	Massachusetts	42°21′47″N 071°00′23″W	
KBOW	BOW	Bartow Executive Airport	Bartow	Florida	27°56′36″N 081°47′00″W	
KBPG		Big Spring McMahon-Wrinkle Airport	Big Spring	Texas	32°12′45″N 101°31′18″W	
KBPI	BPI	Miley Memorial Field	Big Piney	Wyoming	42°35′06″N 110°06′40″W	
KBPK	WMH	Ozark Regional Airport (formerly Baxter County Regional Airport)	Mountain Home	Arkansas	36°22′08″N 092°28′14″W	
KBPP	BWM	Bowman Municipal Airport	Bowman	North Dakota	46°11′13″N 103°25′41″W	Closed
KBPT	BPT	Jack Brooks Regional Airport	Nederland (near Beaumont & Port Arthur)	Texas	29°57′03″N 094°01′14″W	
KBQK	BQK	Brunswick Golden Isles Airport	Brunswick	Georgia	31°15′32″N 081°27′59″W	
KBQP		Morehouse Memorial Airport	Bastrop	Louisiana	32°45′22″N 091°52′50″W	
KBQR	BQR	Buffalo-Lancaster Regional Airport	Lancaster	New York	42°55′20″N 078°36′44″W	
KBRD	BRD	Brainerd Lakes Regional Airport	Brainerd	Minnesota	46°24′08″N 094°08′08″W	
KBRG		Belén Regional Airport	Belén	New Mexico	34°38′37″N 106°50′09″W	
KBRL	BRL	Southeast Iowa Regional Airport	Burlington	Iowa	40°46′59″N 091°07′32″W	
KBRO	BRO	Brownsville/South Padre Island International Airport	Brownsville	Texas	25°54′25″N 097°25′33″W	
KBRY		Samuels Field	Bardstown	Kentucky	37°48′52″N 085°29′59″W	
KBST		Belfast Municipal Airport	Belfast	Maine	44°24′34″N 069°00′43″W	
KBTA		Blair Municipal Airport	Blair	Nebraska	41°24′53″N 096°06′32″W	
KBTF	BTF	Skypark Airport	Bountiful	Utah	40°52′10″N 111°55′38″W	
KBTL	BTL	W. K. Kellogg Airport	Battle Creek	Michigan	42°18′23″N 085°15′00″W	
KBTM	BTM	Bert Mooney Airport	Butte	Montana	45°57′17″N 112°29′51″W	
KBTN		Britton Municipal Airport	Britton	South Dakota	45°48′54″N 097°44′34″W	
KBTP	BTP	Pittsburgh-Butler Regional Airport (K.W. Scholter Field)	Butler	Pennsylvania	40°46′37″N 079°56′59″W	
KBTR	BTR	Baton Rouge Metropolitan Airport	Baton Rouge	Louisiana	30°31′58″N 091°09′00″W	
KBTV	BTV	Burlington International Airport	Burlington	Vermont	44°28′19″N 073°09′12″W	
KBTY	BTY	Beatty Airport	Beatty	Nevada	36°51′40″N 116°47′13″W	
KBUB		Cram Field	Burwell	Nebraska	41°46′39″N 099°09′01″W	
KBUF	BUF	Buffalo Niagara International Airport	Buffalo	New York	42°56′26″N 078°43′56″W	
KBUM		Butler Memorial Airport	Butler	Missouri	38°17′23″N 094°20′24″W	
KBUR	BUR	Hollywood Burbank Airport (Bob Hope Airport)	Burbank	California	34°12′02″N 118°21′31″W	
KBUU		Burlington Municipal Airport	Burlington	Wisconsin	42°41′27″N 088°18′17″W	
KBUY		Burlington-Alamance Regional Airport	Burlington	North Carolina	36°02′55″N 079°28′30″W	
KBVI	BFP	Beaver County Airport	Beaver Falls	Pennsylvania	40°46′21″N 080°23′29″W	
KBVN		Albion Municipal Airport	Albion	Nebraska	41°43′43″N 098°03′21″W	
KBVO	BVO	Bartlesville Municipal Airport	Bartlesville	Oklahoma	36°45′51″N 096°00′40″W	
KBVS	MVW	Skagit Regional Airport	Burlington & Mount Vernon	Washington	48°28′15″N 122°25′15″W	
KBVU		Boulder City Municipal Airport	Boulder City	Nevada	35°56′50″N 114°51′37″W	
KBVX	BVX	Batesville Regional Airport	Batesville	Arkansas	35°43′34″N 091°38′51″W	
KBVY	BVY	Beverly Regional Airport	Beverly	Massachusetts	42°35′03″N 070°54′58″W	
KBWC	BWC	Brawley Municipal Airport	Brawley	California	32°59′35″N 115°31′01″W	
KBWD	BWD	Brownwood Regional Airport	Brownwood	Texas	31°47′37″N 098°57′23″W	
KBWG	BWG	Bowling Green-Warren County Regional Airport	Bowling Green	Kentucky	36°57′52″N 086°25′11″W	
KBWI	BWI	Baltimore-Washington International Thurgood Marshall Airport	Baltimore	Maryland	39°10′31″N 076°40′06″W	
KBWP		Harry Stern Airport	Wahpeton	North Dakota	46°14′39″N 096°36′26″W	
KBWW	BWM	Bowman Regional Airport	Bowman	North Dakota	46°09′56″N 103°18′03″W	
KBXA	BXA	George R. Carr Memorial Airfield	Bogalusa	Louisiana	30°48′49″N 089°51′54″W	
KBXG		Burke County Airport	Waynesboro	Georgia	33°02′31″N 082°00′09″W	
KBXK	BXK	Buckeye Municipal Airport	Buckeye	Arizona	33°25′14″N 112°41′10″W	
KBXM	NHZ	Brunswick Executive Airport (formerly NAS Brunswick)	Brunswick	Maine	43°53′32″N 069°56′20″W	
KBYG	BYG	Johnson County Airport	Buffalo	Wyoming	44°22′51″N 106°43′18″W	
KBYH	BYH	Arkansas International Airport	Blytheville	Arkansas	35°57′52″N 089°56′38″W	
KBYI	BYI	Burley Municipal Airport	Burley	Idaho	42°32′33″N 113°46′18″W	
KBYL		Williamsburg-Whitley County Airport	Williamsburg	Kentucky	36°47′42″N 084°11′58″W	
KBYS		Bicycle Lake Army Airfield (Fort Irwin)	Barstow	California	35°16′50″N 116°37′48″W	
KBYY	BBC	Bay City Municipal Airport	Bay City	Texas	28°58′24″N 095°51′49″W	
KBZN	BZN	Bozeman Yellowstone International Airport (Gallatin Field)	Bozeman	Montana	45°46′37″N 111°09′07″W	

== KC ==
ICAO	IATA	Airport name	Community	State	Coordinates	Notes
KCAD	CAD	Wexford County Airport	Cadillac	Michigan	44°16′31″N 085°25′08″W	
KCAE	CAE	Columbia Metropolitan Airport	West Columbia (near Columbia)	South Carolina	33°56′20″N 081°07′10″W	
KCAG	CIG	Craig-Moffat Airport	Craig	Colorado	40°29′43″N 107°31′18″W	
KCAK	CAK	Akron-Canton Regional Airport	Akron (near Canton)	Ohio	40°54′54″N 081°26′37″W	
KCAO	CAO	Clayton Municipal Airpark	Clayton	New Mexico	36°26′47″N 103°08′59″W	
KCAR	CAR	Caribou Municipal Airport	Caribou	Maine	46°52′17″N 068°01′05″W	
KCAV		Clarion Municipal Airport	Clarion	Iowa	42°44′31″N 093°45′32″W	
KCBE	CBE	Greater Cumberland Regional Airport	Cumberland	Maryland	39°36′56″N 078°45′39″W	
KCBF	CBF	Council Bluffs Municipal Airport	Council Bluffs	Iowa	41°15′36″N 095°45′31″W	
KCBG		Cambridge Municipal Airport	Cambridge	Minnesota	45°33′27″N 093°15′51″W	
KCBK	CBK	Colby Municipal Airport (Shalz Field)	Colby	Kansas	39°25′39″N 101°02′48″W	
KCBM	CBM	Columbus Air Force Base	Columbus	Mississippi	33°38′09″N 088°26′27″W	
KCCA		Clinton Municipal Airport	Clinton	Arkansas	35°35′52″N 092°27′06″W	
KCCB	CCB	Cable Airport	Upland	California	34°06′42″N 117°41′15″W	
KCCO		Newnan-Coweta County Airport	Newnan	Georgia	33°18′42″N 084°46′11″W	
KCCR	CCR	Buchanan Field Airport	Concord	California	37°59′23″N 122°03′25″W	
KCCY	CCY	Northeast Iowa Regional Airport	Charles City	Iowa	43°04′21″N 092°36′39″W	
KCDA	LLX	Caledonia County Airport	Lyndonville	Vermont	44°34′09″N 072°01′05″W	
KCDC	CDC	Cedar City Regional Airport	Cedar City	Utah	37°42′03″N 113°05′56″W	
KCDD		Scotts Seaplane Base	Crane Lake	Minnesota	48°16′00″N 092°29′01″W	
KCDH		Harrell Field (Camden Municipal/Regional Airport)	Camden	Arkansas	33°37′22″N 092°45′48″W	
KCDI		Cambridge Municipal Airport	Cambridge	Ohio	39°58′30″N 081°34′39″W	
KCDK	CDK	George T. Lewis Airport	Cedar Key	Florida	29°08′03″N 083°03′02″W	
KCDN	CDN	Woodward Field (Kershaw County Airport)	Camden	South Carolina	34°17′01″N 080°33′54″W	
KCDR	CDR	Chadron Municipal Airport	Chadron	Nebraska	42°50′15″N 103°05′43″W	
KCDS	CDS	Childress Municipal Airport	Childress	Texas	34°26′02″N 100°17′17″W	
KCDW	CDW	Essex County Airport (Caldwell Airport)	Caldwell	New Jersey	40°52′31″N 074°16′53″W	
KCEA	CEA	Cessna Aircraft Field	Wichita	Kansas	37°38′55″N 097°15′02″W	
KCEC	CEC	Del Norte County Airport (Jack McNamara Field)	Crescent City	California	41°46′49″N 124°14′12″W	
KCEF	CEF	Westover Metropolitan Airport / Westover Air Reserve Base	Springfield / Chicopee	Massachusetts	42°11′38″N 072°32′05″W	
KCEK		Crete Municipal Airport	Crete	Nebraska	40°37′18″N 096°55′38″W	
KCEU	CEU	Oconee County Regional Airport	Clemson	South Carolina	34°40′19″N 082°53′13″W	
KCEV	CEV	Mettel Field	Connersville	Indiana	39°41′54″N 085°07′52″W	
KCEW	CEW	Bob Sikes Airport	Crestview	Florida	30°46′44″N 086°31′20″W	
KCEY	CEY	Murray-Calloway County Airport (Kyle-Oakley Field)	Murray	Kentucky	36°39′52″N 088°22′22″W	
KCEZ	CEZ	Cortez Municipal Airport	Cortez	Colorado	37°18′11″N 108°37′41″W	
KCFD	CFD	Coulter Field	Bryan	Texas	30°42′56″N 096°19′53″W	
KCFE		Buffalo Municipal Airport	Buffalo	Minnesota	45°09′33″N 093°50′36″W	
KCFJ		Crawfordsville Municipal Airport	Crawfordsville	Indiana	39°58′29″N 086°55′16″W	
KCFO		Colorado Air and Space Port	Aurora	Colorado	39°47′07″N 104°32′35″W	
KCFS		Tuscola Area Airport	Caro	Michigan	43°27′31″N 083°26′43″W	
KCFT	CFT	Greenlee County Airport	Clifton / Morenci	Arizona	32°57′25″N 109°12′40″W	
KCFV	CFV	Coffeyville Municipal Airport	Coffeyville	Kansas	37°05′39″N 095°34′19″W	
KCGC		Crystal River Airport (Captain Tom Davis Field)	Crystal River	Florida	28°52′02″N 082°34′17″W	
KCGE	CGE	Cambridge-Dorchester Regional Airport	Cambridge	Maryland	38°32′22″N 076°01′49″W	
KCGF	CGF	Cuyahoga County Airport	Cleveland	Ohio	41°33′54″N 081°29′11″W	
KCGI	CGI	Cape Girardeau Regional Airport	Cape Girardeau	Missouri	37°13′31″N 089°34′15″W	
KCGS	CGS	College Park Airport	College Park	Maryland	38°58′50″N 076°55′20″W	
KCGX		Meigs Field	Chicago	Illinois	41°51′36″N 087°36′31″W	Closed 2003
KCGZ	CGZ	Casa Grande Municipal Airport	Casa Grande	Arizona	32°57′18″N 111°46′01″W	
KCHA	CHA	Chattanooga Metropolitan Airport	Chattanooga	Tennessee	35°02′07″N 085°12′14″W	
KCHD		Chandler Municipal Airport	Chandler	Arizona	33°16′09″N 111°48′40″W	
KCHK	CHK	Chickasha Municipal Airport	Chickasha	Oklahoma	35°05′50″N 097°58′04″W	
KCHN		Wauchula Municipal Airport	Wauchula	Florida	27°30′54″N 081°52′50″W	
KCHO	CHO	Charlottesville-Albemarle Airport	Charlottesville	Virginia	38°08′19″N 078°27′10″W	
KCHQ		Mississippi County Airport	Charleston	Missouri	36°50′32″N 089°21′35″W	
KCHS	CHS	Charleston International Airport (Charleston Air Force Base)	Charleston	South Carolina	32°53′55″N 080°02′26″W	
KCHT		Chillicothe Municipal Airport	Chillicothe	Missouri	39°46′58″N 093°29′47″W	
KCHU		Houston County Airport	Caledonia	Minnesota	43°35′47″N 091°30′14″W	
KCIC	CIC	Chico Municipal Airport	Chico	California	39°47′43″N 121°51′30″W	
KCID	CID	The Eastern Iowa Airport	Cedar Rapids	Iowa	41°53′05″N 091°42′39″W	
KCII		Choteau Airport	Choteau	Montana	47°49′42″N 112°10′06″W	
KCIN	CIN	Arthur N. Neu Airport	Carroll	Iowa	42°02′46″N 094°47′20″W	
KCIR		Cairo Regional Airport	Cairo	Illinois	37°03′50″N 089°13′10″W	
KCIU	CIU	Chippewa County International Airport	Sault Ste Marie	Michigan	46°15′03″N 084°28′21″W	
KCJJ		Ellen Church Field	Cresco	Iowa	43°21′55″N 092°07′59″W	
KCJR		Culpeper Regional Airport	Culpeper	Virginia	38°31′32″N 077°51′35″W	
KCKA	CKA	Kegelman Air Force Auxiliary Field	Cherokee	Oklahoma	36°44′17″N 098°07′34″W	
KCKB	CKB	North Central West Virginia Airport	Clarksburg	West Virginia	39°17′48″N 080°13′41″W	
KCKC	GRM	Grand Marais/Cook County Airport	Grand Marais	Minnesota	47°50′18″N 090°22′59″W	
KCKF	CKF	Crisp County-Cordele Airport	Cordele	Georgia	31°59′20″N 083°46′26″W	
KCKI		Williamsburg Regional Airport	Kingstree	South Carolina	33°43′02″N 079°51′25″W	
KCKM		Fletcher Field	Clarksdale	Mississippi	34°17′59″N 090°30′44″W	
KCKN	CKN	Crookston Municipal Airport	Crookston	Minnesota	47°50′27″N 096°37′18″W	
KCKP		Cherokee Municipal Airport	Cherokee	Iowa	42°44′00″N 095°33′20″W	
KCKV	CKV	Clarksville-Montgomery County Regional Airport (John F. Outlaw Field)	Clarksville	Tennessee	36°37′19″N 087°24′54″W	
KCKZ		Pennridge Airport	Perkasie	Pennsylvania	40°23′25″N 075°17′20″W	
KCLE	CLE	Cleveland Hopkins International Airport	Cleveland	Ohio	41°24′42″N 081°50′59″W	
KCLI	CLI	Clintonville Municipal Airport	Clintonville	Wisconsin	44°36′47″N 088°43′51″W	
KCLK		Clinton Regional Airport	Clinton	Oklahoma	35°32′18″N 098°55′58″W	
KCLL	CLL	Easterwood Airport	College Station	Texas	30°35′19″N 096°21′50″W	
KCLM	CLM	William R. Fairchild International Airport	Port Angeles	Washington	48°07′13″N 123°29′59″W	
KCLR	CLR	Cliff Hatfield Memorial Airport	Calipatria	California	33°07′53″N 115°31′17″W	
KCLS	CLS	Chehalis-Centralia Airport	Chehalis	Washington	46°40′37″N 122°58′58″W	
KCLT	CLT	Charlotte/Douglas International Airport	Charlotte	North Carolina	35°12′50″N 080°56′35″W	
KCLW	CLW	Clearwater Air Park	Clearwater	Florida	27°58′36″N 082°45′31″W	
KCMA		Camarillo Airport	Camarillo	California	34°12′50″N 119°05′40″W	
KCMD		Folsom Field	Cullman	Alabama	34°16′07″N 086°51′29″W	
KCMH	CMH	John Glenn Columbus International Airport	Columbus	Ohio	39°59′53″N 082°53′31″W	
KCMI	CMI	University of Illinois Willard Airport	Savoy (Champaign-Urbana area)	Illinois	40°02′21″N 088°16′41″W	
KCMR		H.A. Clark Memorial Field	Williams	Arizona	35°18′20″N 112°11′40″W	
KCMX	CMX	Houghton County Memorial Airport	Hancock	Michigan	47°10′06″N 088°29′21″W	
KCMY	CMY	Sparta/Fort McCoy Airport	Sparta	Wisconsin	43°57′31″N 090°44′16″W	
KCNB		Myers Field	Canby	Minnesota	44°43′40″N 096°15′48″W	
KCNC		Chariton Municipal Airport	Chariton	Iowa	41°01′08″N 093°21′44″W	
KCNH	CNH	Claremont Municipal Airport	Claremont	New Hampshire	43°22′14″N 072°22′07″W	
KCNI		Cherokee County Regional Airport	Canton	Georgia	34°18′38″N 084°25′26″W	
KCNK	CNK	Blosser Municipal Airport	Concordia	Kansas	39°32′57″N 097°39′08″W	
KCNM	CNM	Cavern City Air Terminal	Carlsbad	New Mexico	32°20′15″N 104°15′48″W	
KCNO	CNO	Chino Airport	Chino	California	33°58′29″N 117°38′12″W	
KCNP		Billy G. Ray Field	Chappell	Nebraska	41°04′39″N 102°27′51″W	
KCNU	CNU	Chanute Martin Johnson Airport	Chanute	Kansas	37°40′08″N 095°29′06″W	
KCNW	CNW	TSTC Waco Airport	Waco	Texas	31°38′16″N 097°04′27″W	
KCNY	CNY	Canyonlands Regional Airport	Moab	Utah	38°45′18″N 109°45′17″W	
KCOD	COD	Yellowstone Regional Airport	Cody	Wyoming	44°31′13″N 109°01′26″W	
KCOE	COE	Coeur d'Alene Air Terminal	Coeur d'Alene	Idaho	47°46′28″N 116°49′10″W	
KCOF	COF	Patrick Space Force Base	Cocoa Beach	Florida	28°14′06″N 080°36′36″W	
KCOI	COI	Merritt Island Airport	Merritt Island	Florida	28°20′30″N 080°41′08″W	
KCOM		Coleman Municipal Airport	Coleman	Texas	31°50′28″N 099°24′12″W	
KCON	CON	Concord Municipal Airport	Concord	New Hampshire	43°12′10″N 071°30′08″W	
KCOQ		Cloquet Carlton County Airport	Cloquet	Minnesota	46°42′04″N 092°30′13″W	
KCOS	COS	Colorado Springs Airport (City of Colorado Springs Municipal Airport)	Colorado Springs	Colorado	38°48′21″N 104°42′03″W	
KCOT	COT	Cotulla-La Salle County Airport	Cotulla	Texas	28°27′24″N 099°13′06″W	
KCOU	COU	Columbia Regional Airport	Columbia	Missouri	38°49′05″N 092°13′11″W	
KCPC		Columbus County Municipal Airport	Whiteville	North Carolina	34°16′22″N 078°42′54″W	
KCPF		Wendell H. Ford Airport	Hazard	Kentucky	37°23′15″N 083°15′42″W	
KCPK		Chesapeake Regional Airport	Norfolk	Virginia	36°39′56″N 076°19′14″W	
KCPM	CPM	Compton/Woodley Airport	Compton	California	33°53′24″N 118°14′37″W	
KCPP		Greene County Regional Airport	Greensboro	Georgia	33°35′52″N 083°08′20″W	
KCPR	CPR	Natrona County International Airport	Casper	Wyoming	42°54′29″N 106°27′52″W	
KCPS	CPS	St. Louis Downtown Airport	Cahokia	Illinois	38°34′15″N 090°09′22″W	
KCPT		Cleburne Regional Airport	Cleburne	Texas	32°21′14″N 097°26′02″W	
KCPU	CPU	Calaveras County Airport (Maury Rasmussen Field)	San Andreas	California	38°08′46″N 120°38′53″W	
KCQA		Lakefield Airport	Celina	Ohio	40°29′03″N 084°33′32″W	
KCQB		Chandler Regional Airport	Chandler	Oklahoma	35°43′26″N 096°49′13″W	
KCQF		H. L. Sonny Callahan Airport	Fairhope	Alabama	30°27′38″N 087°52′37″W	
KCQJ		Cheyenne Mountain Space Force Station Heliport	Colorado Springs	Colorado	38°44′19″N 104°50′06″W	
KCQM		Cook Municipal Airport	Cook	Minnesota	47°49′20″N 092°41′22″W	
KCQW	HCW	Cheraw Municipal Airport (Lynch Bellinger Field)	Cheraw	South Carolina	34°42′46″N 079°57′25″W	
KCQX		Chatham Municipal Airport	Chatham	Massachusetts	41°41′18″N 069°59′22″W	
KCRE	CRE	Grand Strand Airport	North Myrtle Beach	South Carolina	33°48′42″N 078°43′26″W	
KCRG	CRG	Jacksonville Executive at Craig Airport	Jacksonville	Florida	30°20′11″N 081°30′52″W	
KCRO	CRO	Corcoran Airport	Corcoran	California	36°06′10″N 119°35′41″W	Closed
KCRP	CRP	Corpus Christi International Airport	Corpus Christi	Texas	27°46′13″N 097°30′04″W	
KCRQ	CLD	McClellan-Palomar Airport	Carlsbad	California	33°07′42″N 117°16′48″W	
KCRS		Corsicana Municipal Airport (C. David Campbell Field)	Corsicana	Texas	32°01′41″N 096°24′02″W	
KCRT	CRT	Z.M. Jack Stell Field	Crossett	Arkansas	33°10′42″N 091°52′49″W	
KCRW	CRW	Yeager Airport	Charleston	West Virginia	38°22′33″N 081°35′35″W	
KCRX	CRX	Roscoe Turner Airport	Corinth	Mississippi	34°54′54″N 088°36′13″W	
KCRZ		Corning Municipal Airport	Corning	Iowa	40°59′39″N 094°45′18″W	
KCSB		Cambridge Municipal Airport	Cambridge	Nebraska	40°18′24″N 100°09′44″W	
KCSG	CSG	Columbus Airport	Columbus	Georgia	32°30′59″N 084°56′20″W	
KCSL		O'Sullivan Army Heliport	Camp San Luis Obispo	California	35°19′34″N 120°44′35″W	
KCSM	CSM	Clinton-Sherman Industrial Airpark (Oklahoma Air & Space Port)	Clinton	Oklahoma	35°20′23″N 099°12′02″W	
KCSQ	CSQ	Creston Municipal Airport	Creston	Iowa	41°01′17″N 094°21′48″W	
KCSV	CSV	Crossville Memorial Airport (Whitson Field)	Crossville	Tennessee	35°57′05″N 085°05′06″W	
KCTB	CTB	Cut Bank Municipal Airport	Cut Bank	Montana	48°36′30″N 112°22′34″W	
KCTJ		West Georgia Regional Airport (O.V. Gray Field)	Carrollton	Georgia	33°37′54″N 085°09′08″W	
KCTK		Ingersoll Airport	Canton	Illinois	40°34′09″N 090°04′29″W	
KCTY	CTY	Cross City Airport	Cross City	Florida	29°38′08″N 083°06′17″W	
KCTZ	CTZ	Clinton-Sampson County Airport	Clinton	North Carolina	34°58′30″N 078°21′56″W	
KCUB	CUB	Columbia Owens Downtown Airport	Columbia	South Carolina	33°58′14″N 080°59′43″W	
KCUH		Cushing Municipal Airport	Cushing	Oklahoma	35°57′00″N 096°46′24″W	
KCUL		Carmi Municipal Airport	Carmi	Illinois	38°05′22″N 088°07′23″W	
KCUT		Custer County Airport	Custer	South Dakota	43°44′01″N 103°37′10″W	
KCVB		Castroville Municipal Airport	Castroville	Texas	29°20′31″N 098°51′04″W	
KCVC		Covington Municipal Airport	Covington	Georgia	33°37′56″N 083°50′48″W	
KCVG	CVG	Cincinnati/Northern Kentucky International Airport	Hebron (near Cincinnati, Ohio and Covington)	Kentucky	39°02′56″N 084°40′04″W	
KCVH	HLI	Hollister Municipal Airport	Hollister	California	36°53′36″N 121°24′37″W	
KCVK		Sharp County Regional Airport	Ash Flat	Arkansas	36°15′54″N 091°33′46″W	
KCVN	CVN	Clovis Municipal Airport	Clovis	New Mexico	34°25′31″N 103°04′45″W	
KCVO	CVO	Corvallis Municipal Airport	Corvallis	Oregon	44°29′50″N 123°17′22″W	
KCVS	CVS	Cannon Air Force Base	Clovis	New Mexico	34°22′58″N 103°19′20″W	
KCVX		Charlevoix Municipal Airport	Charlevoix	Michigan	45°18′17″N 085°16′31″W	
KCWA	CWA	Central Wisconsin Airport	Mosinee	Wisconsin	44°46′40″N 089°39′57″W	
KCWC		Kickapoo Downtown Airpark	Wichita Falls	Texas	33°51′39″N 098°29′25″W	
KCWF	CWF	Chennault International Airport	Lake Charles	Louisiana	30°12′38″N 093°08′35″W	
KCWI		Clinton Municipal Airport	Clinton	Iowa	41°49′52″N 090°19′45″W	
KCWS		Dennis F. Cantrell Field	Conway	Arkansas	35°04′51″N 092°25′30″W	Closed and replaced by KCXW
KCWV		Claxton-Evans County Airport	Claxton	Georgia	32°11′42″N 081°52′10″W	
KCXE		Chase City Municipal Airport	Chase City	Virginia	36°47′18″N 078°30′05″W	
KCXL	CXL	Calexico International Airport	Calexico	California	32°40′10″N 115°30′48″W	
KCXO	CXO	Lone Star Executive Airport	Houston	Texas	30°21′09″N 095°24′52″W	
KCXP	CSN	Carson City Airport	Carson City	Nevada	39°11′32″N 119°44′04″W	
KCXU		Camilla-Mitchell County Airport	Camilla	Georgia	31°12′47″N 084°14′07″W	
KCXW		Conway Municipal Airport (Cantrell Field)	Conway	Arkansas	35°01′11″N 092°33′18″W	
KCXY	HAR	Capital City Airport	Harrisburg	Pennsylvania	40°13′02″N 076°51′05″W	
KCYO		Pickaway County Memorial Airport	Circleville	Ohio	39°30′58″N 082°58′56″W	
KCYS	CYS	Cheyenne Regional Airport (Jerry Olson Field)	Cheyenne	Wyoming	41°09′20″N 104°48′38″W	
KCYW		Clay Center Municipal Airport	Clay Center	Kansas	39°23′14″N 097°09′26″W	
KCZD		Cozad Municipal Airport	Cozad	Nebraska	40°52′05″N 100°00′11″W	
KCZG	CZG	Tri-Cities Airport	Endicott	New York	42°04′43″N 076°05′47″W	
KCZK	CZK	Cascade Locks State Airport	Cascade Locks	Oregon	45°40′37″N 121°52′44″W	
KCZL		Tom B. David Field	Calhoun	Georgia	34°27′20″N 084°56′21″W	
KCZT		Dimmit County Airport	Carrizo Springs	Texas	28°31′22″N 099°49′25″W	

== KD ==
ICAO	IATA	Airport name	Community	State	Coordinates	Notes
KDAA	DAA	Davison Army Airfield	Fort Belvoir	Virginia	38°42′54″N 077°10′52″W	
KDAB	DAB	Daytona Beach International Airport	Daytona Beach	Florida	29°11′05″N 081°03′38″W	
KDAF		Necedah Airport	Necedah	Wisconsin	44°02′00″N 090°05′06″W	
KDAG		Barstow-Daggett Airport	Daggett	California	34°51′13″N 116°47′12″W	
KDAL	DAL	Dallas Love Field	Dallas	Texas	32°50′50″N 096°51′06″W	
KDAN	DAN	Danville Regional Airport	Danville	Virginia	36°34′20″N 079°20′10″W	
KDAW		Skyhaven Airport	Rochester	New Hampshire	43°17′03″N 070°55′45″W	
KDAY	DAY	James M. Cox International Airport	Dayton	Ohio	39°54′08″N 084°13′10″W	
KDBN		W. H. 'Bud' Barron Airport	Dublin	Georgia	32°33′52″N 082°59′07″W	
KDBQ	DBQ	Dubuque Regional Airport	Dubuque	Iowa	42°24′07″N 090°42′34″W	
KDCA	DCA	Ronald Reagan Washington National Airport	Arlington County (near Washington, D.C.)	Virginia	38°51′08″N 077°02′16″W	
KDCM		Chester Catawba Regional Airport	Chester	South Carolina	34°47′22″N 081°11′45″W	
KDCR	DCR	Decatur Hi-Way Airport	Decatur	Indiana	40°50′15″N 084°51′45″W	Closed
KDCU		Pryor Field Regional Airport	Decatur	Alabama	34°39′15″N 086°56′43″W	
KDCY		Daviess County Airport	Washington	Indiana	38°42′02″N 087°07′47″W	
KDDC	DDC	Dodge City Regional Airport	Dodge City	Kansas	37°45′47″N 099°57′56″W	
KDDH		William H. Morse State Airport	Bennington	Vermont	42°53′28″N 073°14′46″W	
KDEC	DEC	Decatur Airport	Decatur	Illinois	39°50′04″N 088°51′56″W	
KDED		DeLand Municipal Airport (Sidney H. Taylor Field)	DeLand	Florida	29°04′01″N 081°17′02″W	
KDEH		Decorah Municipal Airport	Decorah	Iowa	43°16′32″N 091°44′22″W	
KDEN	DEN	Denver International Airport	Denver	Colorado	39°51′42″N 104°40′23″W	Replaced Stapleton Int'l
KDEQ	DEQ	J. Lynn Helms Sevier County Airport	De Queen	Arkansas	34°02′49″N 094°23′58″W	
KDET	DET	Coleman A. Young International Airport	Detroit	Michigan	42°24′33″N 083°00′36″W	
KDEW		Deer Park Airport	Deer Park	Washington	47°58′01″N 117°25′43″W	
KDFI		Defiance Memorial Airport	Defiance	Ohio	41°20′15″N 084°25′44″W	
KDFW	DFW	Dallas/Fort Worth International Airport	Dallas / Fort Worth	Texas	32°53′49″N 097°02′17″W	
KDGL	DGL	Douglas Municipal Airport	Douglas	Arizona	31°20′33″N 109°30′23″W	
KDGW	DGW	Converse County Airport	Douglas	Wyoming	42°47′50″N 105°23′09″W	
KDHN	DHN	Dothan Regional Airport	Dothan	Alabama	31°19′16″N 085°26′58″W	
KDHT		Dalhart Municipal Airport	Dalhart	Texas	36°01′21″N 102°32′50″W	
KDIJ		Driggs-Reed Memorial Airport	Driggs	Idaho	43°44′33″N 111°05′51″W	
KDIK	DIK	Dickinson Theodore Roosevelt Regional Airport	Dickinson	North Dakota	46°47′50″N 102°48′07″W	
KDJT	PBI	President Donald J. Trump International Airport	West Palm Beach	Florida	26°40′59″N 080°05′44″W	Formerly KPBI
KDKB		DeKalb Taylor Municipal Airport	DeKalb	Illinois	41°56′02″N 088°42′20″W	
KDKK		Chautauqua County/Dunkirk Airport	Dunkirk	New York	42°29′36″N 079°16′19″W	
KDKR	DKR	Houston County Airport	Crockett	Texas	31°18′25″N 095°24′14″W	
KDKX		Knoxville Downtown Island Airport	Knoxville	Tennessee	35°57′50″N 083°52′25″W	
KDLC		Dillon County Airport	Dillon	South Carolina	34°26′57″N 079°22′07″W	
KDLF	DLF	Laughlin Air Force Base	Del Rio	Texas	29°21′34″N 100°46′41″W	
KDLH	DLH	Duluth International Airport	Duluth	Minnesota	46°50′32″N 092°11′37″W	
KDLL		Baraboo-Wisconsin Dells Airport	Baraboo	Wisconsin	43°31′19″N 089°46′17″W	
KDLN		Dillon Airport	Dillon	Montana	45°15′19″N 112°33′09″W	
KDLO		Delano Municipal Airport	Delano	California	35°44′44″N 119°14′11″W	
KDLS	DLS	Columbia Gorge Regional Airport (The Dalles Municipal Airport)	The Dalles	Oregon	45°37′07″N 121°10′02″W	
KDLZ	DLZ	Delaware Municipal Airport	Delaware	Ohio	40°16′48″N 083°06′43″W	
KDMA	DMA	Davis-Monthan Air Force Base	Tucson	Arizona	32°09′49″N 110°50′58″W	
KDMN	DMN	Deming Municipal Airport	Deming	New Mexico	32°15′44″N 107°43′14″W	
KDMO	DMO	Sedalia Regional Airport	Sedalia	Missouri	38°42′27″N 093°10′33″W	
KDMW		Carroll County Regional Airport (Jack B. Poage Field)	Westminster	Maryland	39°36′30″N 077°00′28″W	
KDNA		Doña Ana County International Jetport	Santa Teresa	New Mexico	31°52′50″N 106°42′13″W	
KDNL		Daniel Field	Augusta	Georgia	33°27′59″N 082°02′22″W	
KDNN		Dalton Municipal Airport	Dalton	Georgia	34°43′23″N 084°52′13″W	
KDNS		Denison Municipal Airport	Denison	Iowa	41°59′12″N 095°22′50″W	
KDNV	DNV	Vermilion Regional Airport	Danville	Illinois	40°11′57″N 087°35′44″W	
KDOV	DOV	Dover Air Force Base	Dover	Delaware	39°07′42″N 075°27′53″W	
KDPA		Dupage Airport	West Chicago	Illinois	41°54′25″N 088°14′54″W	
KDPG		Michael Army Airfield	Dugway Proving Ground	Utah	40°11′58″N 112°56′15″W	
KDPL		Duplin County Airport	Kenansville	North Carolina	35°00′00″N 077°58′54″W	
KDQH		Douglas Municipal Airport	Douglas	Georgia	31°28′36″N 082°51′38″W	
KDRA		Desert Rock Airport	Mercury	Nevada	36°37′10″N 116°01′58″W	
KDRI	DRI	Beauregard Regional Airport	De Ridder	Louisiana	30°49′54″N 093°20′24″W	
KDRM	DRE	Drummond Island Airport	Drummond Island	Michigan	46°00′34″N 083°44′38″W	
KDRO		Durango-La Plata County Airport	Durango	Colorado	37°09′05″N 107°45′14″W	
KDRP		Delta Regional Airport	Colt	Arkansas	35°07′12″N 090°49′35″W	
KDRT		Del Rio International Airport	Del Rio	Texas	29°22′27″N 100°55′38″W	
KDRU		Drummond Airport	Drummond	Montana	46°37′18″N 113°12′06″W	
KDSM	DSM	Des Moines International Airport	Des Moines	Iowa	41°32′02″N 093°39′47″W	
KDSV		Dansville Municipal Airport	Dansville, Livingston County	New York	42°34′15″N 077°42′47″W	
KDTA		Delta Municipal Airport	Delta	Utah	39°22′50″N 112°30′28″W	
KDTG		Dwight Airport	Dwight	Illinois	41°07′57″N 088°26′24″W	
KDTL	DTL	Detroit Lakes Airport (Wething Field)	Detroit Lakes	Minnesota	46°49′31″N 095°53′05″W	
KDTN	DTN	Shreveport Downtown Airport	Shreveport	Louisiana	32°32′25″N 093°44′42″W	
KDTO		Denton Enterprise Airport	Denton	Texas	33°12′03″N 097°11′53″W	
KDTS		Destin Executive Airport	Destin	Florida	30°24′00″N 086°28′17″W	
KDTW	DTW	Detroit Metropolitan Wayne County Airport	Romulus (near Detroit)	Michigan	42°12′45″N 083°21′12″W	
KDUA	DUA	Durant Regional Airport-Eaker Field	Durant	Oklahoma	33°56′32″N 096°23′40″W	
KDUB		Dubois Municipal Airport	Dubois	Wyoming	43°32′54″N 109°41′24″W	
KDUC		Halliburton Field (Duncan Municipal Airport)	Duncan	Oklahoma	34°28′15″N 097°57′36″W	
KDUG		Bisbee-Douglas International Airport	Bisbee / Douglas	Arizona	31°28′08″N 109°36′13″W	
KDUH		Toledo Suburban Airport	Lambertville	Michigan	41°44′09″N 083°39′21″W	
KDUJ	DUJ	DuBois Regional Airport (formerly DuBois-Jefferson County Airport)	DuBois	Pennsylvania	41°10′42″N 078°53′55″W	
KDUX	DUX	Moore County Airport	Dumas	Texas	35°51′26″N 102°00′47″W	
KDVK		Stuart Powell Field	Danville	Kentucky	37°34′40″N 084°46′11″W	
KDVL	DVL	Devils Lake Regional Airport (Devils Lake Municipal Airport)	Devils Lake	North Dakota	48°06′52″N 098°54′30″W	
KDVN		Davenport Municipal Airport	Davenport	Iowa	41°36′37″N 090°35′18″W	
KDVO		Gnoss Field (Marin County Airport)	Novato	California	38°08′37″N 122°33′22″W	
KDVP		Slayton Municipal Airport	Slayton	Minnesota	43°59′12″N 095°46′57″W	
KDVT		Phoenix Deer Valley Airport	Phoenix	Arizona	33°41′18″N 112°04′57″W	
KDWA		Yolo County Airport	Davis	California	38°34′46″N 121°51′25″W	
KDWH		David Wayne Hooks Memorial Airport	Spring	Texas	30°03′43″N 095°33′10″W	
KDWU		Ashland Regional Airport	Ashland	Kentucky	38°33′16″N 082°44′17″W	
KDWX		Dixon Airport	Dixon	Wyoming	41°02′15″N 107°29′33″W	
KDXE		Dexter Municipal Airport	Dexter	Missouri	36°46′32″N 089°56′29″W	
KDXR		Danbury Municipal Airport	Danbury	Connecticut	41°22′18″N 073°28′56″W	
KDXX		Lac qui Parle County Airport	Madison	Minnesota	44°59′11″N 096°10′40″W	
KDYA	DYA	Demopolis Municipal Airport (Julian D. "Buzz" Sawyer Airport)	Demopolis	Alabama	32°27′50″N 087°57′15″W	
KDYB	DYB	Summerville Airport	Summerville	South Carolina	33°03′48″N 080°16′46″W	
KDYL		Doylestown Airport	Doylestown	Pennsylvania	40°19′59″N 075°07′19″W	
KDYR		Dyersburg Regional Airport	Dyersburg	Tennessee	35°59′53″N 089°24′24″W	
KDYS	DYS	Dyess Air Force Base	Abilene	Texas	32°25′15″N 099°51′17″W	
KDYT		Sky Harbor Airport & Seaplane Base	Duluth	Minnesota	46°43′19″N 092°02′36″W	
KDZB		Horseshoe Bay Resort Airport	Horseshoe Bay	Texas	30°31′38″N 098°21′31″W	
KDZJ	DZJ	Blairsville Airport	Blairsville	Georgia	34°51′16″N 083°59′50″W	

== KE ==
ICAO	IATA	Airport name	Community	State	Coordinates	Notes
KEAG		Eagle Grove Municipal Airport	Eagle Grove	Iowa	42°42′34″N 093°54′56″W	
KEAN	EAN	Phifer Airfield	Wheatland	Wyoming	42°03′20″N 104°55′43″W	
KEAR	EAR	Kearney Regional Airport	Kearney	Nebraska	40°43′37″N 099°00′24″W	
KEAT		Pangborn Memorial Airport	Wenatchee	Washington	47°23′53″N 120°12′21″W	
KEAU	EAU	Chippewa Valley Regional Airport	Eau Claire	Wisconsin	44°51′57″N 091°29′03″W	
KEBA		Elbert County Airport (Patz Field)	Elberton	Georgia	34°05′44″N 082°49′03″W	
KEBD		Southern West Virginia Regional Airport	Williamson	West Virginia	37°40′54″N 082°07′19″W	
KEBG	EBG	South Texas International Airport at Edinburg (Edinburg International Airport)	Edinburg	Texas	26°26′30″N 098°07′20″W	
KEBS		Webster City Municipal Airport	Webster City	Iowa	42°26′11″N 093°52′09″W	
KEBY		US Coast Guard Station Neah Bay Heliport	Neah Bay	Washington	48°22′14″N 124°35′53″W	
KECG	ECG	Elizabeth City Regional Airport / Elizabeth City CGAS (Elizabeth City-Pasquotank County Regional Airport)	Elizabeth City	North Carolina	36°15′38″N 076°10′28″W	
KECP	ECP	Northwest Florida Beaches International Airport	Panama City	Florida	30°21′30″N 085°47′44″W	
KECS	ECS	Mondell Field	Newcastle	Wyoming	43°53′03″N 104°18′52″W	
KECU		Edwards County Airport	Rocksprings	Texas	29°56′48″N 100°10′25″W	
KEDC		Austin Executive Airport (Bird's Nest Airport)	Austin	Texas	30°24′00″N 097°34′25″W	
KEDE	EDE	Northeastern Regional Airport	Edenton	North Carolina	36°01′40″N 076°34′02″W	
KEDG		Weide Army Heliport	Edgewood Arsenal, Aberdeen Proving Ground	Maryland	39°23′31″N 076°17′29″W	
KEDJ	EDJ	Bellefontaine Regional Airport	Bellefontaine	Ohio	40°22′20″N 083°49′08″W	
KEDN		Enterprise Municipal Airport	Enterprise	Alabama	31°17′59″N 085°53′59″W	
KEDU		University Airport	Davis	California	38°31′53″N 121°47′11″W	
KEDW	EDW	Edwards Air Force Base	Rosamond	California	34°54′20″N 117°53′01″W	
KEED		Needles Airport	Needles	California	34°45′59″N 114°37′24″W	
KEEN	EEN	Dillant-Hopkins Airport	Keene	New Hampshire	42°53′54″N 072°16′15″W	
KEEO		Meeker Airport	Meeker	Colorado	40°02′56″N 107°53′09″W	
KEET		Shelby County Airport	Alabaster	Alabama	33°10′40″N 086°46′59″W	
KEFC		Belle Fourche Municipal Airport	Belle Fourche	South Dakota	44°44′03″N 103°51′43″W	
KEFD		Ellington Field Joint Reserve Base	Houston	Texas	29°36′26″N 095°09′32″W	
KEFK		Northeast Kingdom International Airport	Newport	Vermont	44°53′20″N 072°13′45″W	
KEFT		Monroe Municipal Airport	Monroe	Wisconsin	42°36′54″N 089°35′25″W	
KEFW		Jefferson Municipal Airport	Jefferson	Iowa	42°00′37″N 094°20′31″W	
KEGE	EGE	Eagle County Regional Airport	Eagle (near Vail)	Colorado	39°38′33″N 106°55′04″W	
KEGI		Duke Field (Eglin Auxiliary Field 3)	Crestview	Florida	30°39′01″N 086°31′22″W	
KEGQ		Emmetsburg Municipal Airport	Emmetsburg	Iowa	43°06′02″N 094°42′12″W	
KEGT		Wellington Municipal Airport	Wellington	Kansas	37°19′25″N 097°23′18″W	
KEGV		Eagle River Union Airport	Eagle River	Wisconsin	45°55′56″N 089°16′06″W	
KEHA		Elkhart-Morton County Airport	Elkhart	Kansas	37°00′03″N 101°52′48″W	
KEHO	EHO	Shelby-Cleveland County Regional Airport	Shelby	North Carolina	35°15′21″N 081°36′03″W	
KEHR		Henderson City-County Airport	Henderson	Kentucky	37°48′28″N 087°41′08″W	
KEIK		Erie Municipal Airport	Erie	Colorado	40°00′37″N 105°02′53″W	
KEIW		County Memorial Airport	New Madrid	Missouri	36°32′07″N 089°35′59″W	
KEKA	EKA	Murray Field	Eureka	California	40°48′12″N 124°06′46″W	
KEKM		Elkhart Municipal Airport	Elkhart	Indiana	41°43′10″N 086°00′12″W	
KEKN	EKN	Elkins-Randolph County Airport (Jennings Randolph Field)	Elkins	West Virginia	38°53′24″N 079°51′28″W	
KEKO	EKO	Elko Regional Airport	Elko	Nevada	40°49′30″N 115°47′30″W	
KEKQ		Wayne County Airport	Monticello	Kentucky	36°51′19″N 084°51′22″W	
KEKS	EKS	Ennis - Big Sky Airport	Ennis	Montana	45°16′07″N 111°38′56″W	
KEKX		Elizabethtown Regional Airport (Addington Field)	Elizabethtown	Kentucky	37°41′10″N 085°55′30″W	
KEKY		Bessemer Airport	Bessemer	Alabama	33°18′45″N 086°55′35″W	
KELA		Eagle Lake Airport	Eagle Lake	Texas	29°35′58″N 096°19′21″W	
KELD	ELD	South Arkansas Regional Airport at Goodwin Field	El Dorado	Arkansas	33°13′16″N 092°48′48″W	
KELK	ELK	Elk City Regional Business Airport	Elk City	Oklahoma	35°25′51″N 099°23′39″W	
KELM	ELM	Elmira/Corning Regional Airport	Big Flats (near Elmira & Corning)	New York	42°09′36″N 076°53′30″W	
KELN		Bowers Field	Ellensburg	Washington	47°01′59″N 120°31′50″W	
KELO	ELO	Ely Municipal Airport	Ely	Minnesota	47°49′28″N 091°49′51″W	
KELP	ELP	El Paso International Airport	El Paso	Texas	31°48′26″N 106°22′39″W	
KELY		Ely Airport (Yelland Field)	Ely	Nevada	39°17′59″N 114°50′31″W	
KELZ		Wellsville Municipal Airport (Tarantine Field)	Wellsville	New York	42°06′34″N 077°59′24″W	
KEMM	EMM	Kemmerer Municipal Airport	Kemmerer	Wyoming	41°49′27″N 110°33′25″W	
KEMP		Emporia Municipal Airport	Emporia	Kansas	38°19′50″N 096°11′24″W	
KEMT		San Gabriel Valley Airport	El Monte	California	34°05′10″N 118°02′05″W	
KEMV		Emporia-Greensville Regional Airport	Emporia	Virginia	36°41′13″N 077°28′58″W	
KEND	END	Vance Air Force Base	Enid	Oklahoma	36°20′21″N 097°54′59″W	
KENL		Centralia Municipal Airport	Centralia	Illinois	38°30′55″N 089°05′30″W	
KENV		Wendover Airport	Wendover	Utah	40°43′07″N 114°01′51″W	
KENW	ENW	Kenosha Regional Airport	Kenosha	Wisconsin	42°35′46″N 087°55′39″W	
KEOD		Sabre Army Heliport	Clarksville	Tennessee	36°34′05″N 087°28′51″W	
KEOE		Newberry County Airport	Newberry	South Carolina	34°18′34″N 081°38′26″W	
KEOK		Keokuk Municipal Airport	Keokuk	Iowa	40°27′36″N 091°25′43″W	
KEOP		Pike County Airport	Waverly	Ohio	39°10′01″N 082°55′41″W	
KEOS		Neosho Hugh Robinson Airport	Neosho	Missouri	36°48′39″N 094°23′30″W	
KEPG		Browns Airport	Weeping Water	Nebraska	40°52′11″N 096°06′30″W	
KEPH		Ephrata Municipal Airport	Ephrata	Washington	47°18′29″N 119°31′01″W	
KEPM		Eastport Municipal Airport	Eastport	Maine	44°54′36″N 067°00′46″W	
KEQA		El Dorado/Captain Jack Thomas Memorial Airport	El Dorado	Kansas	37°46′27″N 096°49′03″W	
KEQY	EQY	Monroe Regional Airport	Monroe	North Carolina	35°01′08″N 080°37′13″W	
KERI	ERI	Erie International Airport (Tom Ridge Field)	Erie	Pennsylvania	42°04′59″N 080°10′55″W	
KERR		Errol Airport	Errol	New Hampshire	44°47′32″N 071°09′52″W	
KERV		Kerrville Municipal Airport (Louis Schreiner Field)	Kerrville	Texas	29°58′36″N 099°05′08″W	
KERY	ERY	Luce County Airport	Newberry	Michigan	46°18′40″N 085°27′26″W	
KESC		Delta County Airport	Escanaba	Michigan	45°43′22″N 087°05′37″W	
KESF	ESF	Esler Regional Airport	Alexandria	Louisiana	31°23′42″N 092°17′45″W	
KESN	ESN	Easton Airport (Newnan Field)	Easton	Maryland	38°48′15″N 076°04′08″W	
KEST		Estherville Municipal Airport	Estherville	Iowa	43°24′27″N 094°44′47″W	
KESW		Easton State Airport	Easton	Washington	47°15′15″N 121°11′08″W	
KETB		West Bend Municipal Airport	West Bend	Wisconsin	43°25′20″N 088°07′41″W	
KETC		Tarboro-Edgecombe Airport	Tarboro	North Carolina	35°56′14″N 077°32′47″W	
KETH		Wheaton Municipal Airport	Wheaton	Minnesota	45°46′55″N 096°32′37″W	
KETN		Eastland Municipal Airport	Eastland	Texas	32°24′51″N 098°48′35″W	
KEUF	EUF	Weedon Field	Eufaula	Alabama	31°57′05″N 085°07′44″W	
KEUG	EUG	Eugene Airport / Mahlon Sweet Field	Eugene	Oregon	44°07′23″N 123°13′07″W	
KEUL		Caldwell Industrial Airport	Caldwell	Idaho	43°38′31″N 116°38′09″W	
KEVB		New Smyrna Beach Municipal Airport (Jack Bolt Field)	New Smyrna Beach	Florida	29°03′20″N 080°56′56″W	
KEVM		Eveleth-Virginia Municipal Airport	Eveleth	Minnesota	47°25′27″N 092°29′47″W	
KEVU	EVU	Northwest Missouri Regional Airport	Maryville	Missouri	40°21′12″N 094°55′00″W	
KEVV	EVV	Evansville Regional Airport	Evansville	Indiana	38°02′18″N 087°31′51″W	
KEVW	EVW	Evanston-Uinta County Airport (Burns Field)	Evanston	Wyoming	41°16′29″N 111°02′05″W	
KEVY		Summit Airport	Middletown	Delaware	39°31′13″N 075°43′14″W	
KEWB	EWB	New Bedford Regional Airport	New Bedford	Massachusetts	41°40′34″N 070°57′25″W	
KEWK		Newton City/County Airport	Newton	Kansas	38°03′30″N 097°16′28″W	
KEWN	EWN	Coastal Carolina Regional Airport	New Bern	North Carolina	35°04′23″N 077°02′35″W	
KEWR	EWR	Newark Liberty International Airport	Newark & Elizabeth	New Jersey	40°41′33″N 074°10′07″W	
KEXX	EXX	Davidson County Airport	Lexington	North Carolina	35°46′52″N 080°18′14″W	
KEYE	EYE	Eagle Creek Airpark	Indianapolis	Indiana	39°49′51″N 086°17′40″W	
KEYF		Curtis L. Brown Jr. Field	Elizabethtown	North Carolina	34°36′06″N 078°34′45″W	
KEYQ		Weiser Air Park	Houston	Texas	29°56′07″N 095°38′23″W	Closed
KEYW	EYW	Key West International Airport	Key West	Florida	24°33′22″N 081°45′34″W	
KEZF		Shannon Airport	Fredericksburg	Virginia	38°15′58″N 077°26′57″W	
KEZI		Kewanee Municipal Airport	Kewanee	Illinois	41°12′14″N 089°57′44″W	
KEZM		Heart of Georgia Regional Airport	Eastman	Georgia	32°12′59″N 083°07′43″W	
KEZS	EZS	Shawano Municipal Airport	Shawano	Wisconsin	44°47′14″N 088°33′36″W	
KEZZ		Cameron Memorial Airport	Cameron	Missouri	39°43′39″N 094°16′35″W	

== KF ==
ICAO	IATA	Airport name	Community	State	Coordinates	Notes
KFAF		Joint Base Langley-Eustis	Fort Eustis	Virginia	37°04′58″N 076°21′38″W	Also KLFI; formerly Felker Army Airfield
KFAM		Farmington Regional Airport	Farmington	Missouri	37°45′40″N 090°25′43″W	
KFAR	FAR	Hector International Airport	Fargo	North Dakota	46°55′14″N 096°48′56″W	
KFAT	FAT	Fresno Yosemite International Airport	Fresno	California	36°46′36″N 119°43′08″W	
KFAY	FAY	Fayetteville Regional Airport (Grannis Field)	Fayetteville	North Carolina	34°59′28″N 078°52′49″W	
KFBG	FBG	Simmons Army Airfield	Fort Bragg	North Carolina	35°07′55″N 078°56′11″W	
KFBL		Faribault Municipal Airport	Faribault	Minnesota	44°19′41″N 093°18′42″W	
KFBR	FBR	Fort Bridger Airport	Fort Bridger	Wyoming	41°23′31″N 110°24′25″W	
KFBY		Fairbury Municipal Airport	Fairbury	Nebraska	40°10′45″N 097°10′02″W	
KFCH		Fresno Chandler Executive Airport	Fresno	California	36°43′56″N 119°49′13″W	
KFCI		Chesterfield County Airport	Richmond	Virginia	37°24′24″N 077°31′30″W	
KFCM		Flying Cloud Airport	Eden Prairie	Minnesota	44°49′38″N 093°27′26″W	
KFCS		Butts Army Airfield (Fort Carson)	Fort Carson	Colorado	38°41′02″N 104°45′53″W	
KFCT		Vagabond Army Heliport	Yakima	Washington	46°40′10″N 120°27′30″W	
KFCY		Forrest City Municipal Airport	Forrest City	Arkansas	34°56′31″N 090°46′30″W	
KFDK		Frederick Municipal Airport	Frederick	Maryland	39°25′03″N 077°22′28″W	
KFDR	FDR	Frederick Regional Airport	Frederick	Oklahoma	34°21′08″N 098°59′02″W	
KFDW		Fairfield County Airport	Winnsboro	South Carolina	34°18′56″N 081°06′32″W	
KFDY		Findlay Airport	Findlay	Ohio	41°00′43″N 083°40′07″W	
KFEP		Albertus Airport	Freeport	Illinois	42°14′38″N 089°34′58″W	
KFES		Festus Memorial Airport	Festus	Missouri	38°11′42″N 090°23′08″W	Closed
KFET		Fremont Municipal Airport	Fremont	Nebraska	41°26′57″N 096°31′13″W	
KFEW	FEW	Francis E. Warren Air Force Base	Cheyenne	Wyoming	41°07′59″N 104°52′01″W	
KFFA		First Flight Airport	Kill Devil Hills	North Carolina	36°01′06″N 075°40′17″W	
KFFC		Atlanta Regional Airport (Falcon Field)	Peachtree City	Georgia	33°21′26″N 084°34′19″W	
KFFL		Fairfield Municipal Airport	Fairfield	Iowa	41°03′21″N 091°58′51″W	
KFFM		Fergus Falls Municipal Airport (Einar Mickelson Field)	Fergus Falls	Minnesota	46°17′04″N 096°09′24″W	
KFFO	FFO	Wright-Patterson Air Force Base	Dayton	Ohio	39°49′23″N 084°02′58″W	
KFFT		Capital City Airport	Frankfort	Kentucky	38°10′55″N 084°54′22″W	
KFFX		Fremont Municipal Airport	Fremont	Michigan	43°26′22″N 085°59′42″W	
KFFZ	MSC	Falcon Field	Mesa	Arizona	33°27′39″N 111°43′42″W	
KFGU		Collegedale Municipal Airport	Collegedale	Tennessee	35°02′35″N 085°01′19″W	
KFGX		Fleming-Mason Airport	Flemingsburg	Kentucky	38°32′30″N 083°44′36″W	
KFHB		Fernandina Beach Municipal Airport	Fernandina Beach	Florida	30°36′43″N 081°27′40″W	
KFHR	FRD	Friday Harbor Airport	Friday Harbor	Washington	48°31′19″N 123°01′28″W	
KFHU	FHU	Sierra Vista Municipal Airport / Libby Army Airfield	Fort Huachuca / Sierra Vista	Arizona	31°35′18″N 110°20′40″W	
KFIG		Clearfield-Lawrence Airport	Clearfield	Pennsylvania	41°02′57″N 078°24′55″W	
KFIN		Flagler Executive Airport	Palm Coast	Florida	29°28′03″N 081°12′23″W	
KFIT	FIT	Fitchburg Municipal Airport	Fitchburg	Massachusetts	42°33′15″N 071°45′32″W	
KFKA		Fillmore County Airport	Preston	Minnesota	43°40′34″N 092°10′46″W	
KFKL	FKL	Venango Regional Airport	Franklin	Pennsylvania	41°22′40″N 079°51′37″W	
KFKN		Franklin Municipal-John Beverly Rose Airport	Franklin	Virginia	36°41′53″N 076°54′14″W	
KFKR		Frankfort Municipal Airport	Frankfort	Indiana	40°16′22″N 086°33′47″W	
KFKS		Frankfort Dow Memorial Field	Frankfort	Michigan	44°37′31″N 086°12′03″W	
KFLD		Fond du Lac County Airport	Fond du Lac	Wisconsin	43°46′16″N 088°29′18″W	
KFLG	FLG	Flagstaff Pulliam Airport	Flagstaff	Arizona	35°08′16″N 111°40′28″W	
KFLL	FLL	Fort Lauderdale-Hollywood International Airport	Fort Lauderdale / Hollywood	Florida	26°04′21″N 080°09′10″W	
KFLO	FLO	Florence Regional Airport	Florence	South Carolina	34°11′07″N 079°43′26″W	
KFLP		Marion County Regional Airport	Flippin	Arkansas	36°17′27″N 092°35′25″W	
KFLR		Fall River Municipal Airport	Fall River	Massachusetts	41°45′00″N 071°06′36″W	Closed
KFLU	FLU	Flushing Airport	Queens	New York	40°46′45″N 073°50′00″W	Closed
KFLV	FLV	Sherman Army Airfield	Fort Leavenworth	Kansas	39°22′04″N 094°55′04″W	
KFLX		Fallon Municipal Airport	Fallon	Nevada	39°29′57″N 118°44′56″W	
KFLY		Meadow Lake Airport	Colorado Springs	Colorado	38°56′45″N 104°34′12″W	
KFME	FME	Tipton Airport	Fort Meade / Odenton	Maryland	39°05′07″N 076°45′34″W	
KFMH		Otis Air National Guard Base	Falmouth	Massachusetts	41°39′31″N 070°31′17″W	
KFMM		Fort Morgan Municipal Airport	Fort Morgan	Colorado	40°20′02″N 103°48′15″W	
KFMN		Four Corners Regional Airport	Farmington	New Mexico	36°44′28″N 108°13′48″W	
KFMY	FMY	Page Field	Fort Myers	Florida	26°35′12″N 081°51′48″W	
KFMZ		Fairmont State Airfield	Fairmont	Nebraska	40°35′10″N 097°34′23″W	
KFNB		Brenner Field	Falls City	Nebraska	40°04′43″N 095°35′31″W	
KFNL		Fort Collins-Loveland Municipal Airport	Fort Collins / Loveland	Colorado	40°27′07″N 105°00′41″W	
KFNT	FNT	Bishop International Airport	Flint	Michigan	42°57′56″N 083°44′36″W	
KFOA		Flora Municipal Airport	Flora	Illinois	40°32′23″N 086°32′55″W	
KFOD	FOD	Fort Dodge Regional Airport	Fort Dodge	Iowa	42°33′04″N 094°11′31″W	
KFOE	FOE	Topeka Regional Airport	Topeka	Kansas	38°57′03″N 095°39′49″W	
KFOK	FOK	Francis S. Gabreski Airport	Westhampton Beach	New York	40°50′37″N 072°37′54″W	
KFOM		Fillmore Municipal Airport	Fillmore	Utah	38°57′29″N 112°21′47″W	
KFOT		Rohnerville Airport	Fortuna	California	40°33′14″N 124°07′58″W	
KFOZ		Bigfork Municipal Airport	Bigfork	Minnesota	47°47′02″N 093°39′04″W	
KFPK	FPK	Fitch H. Beach Airport	Charlotte	Michigan	42°34′28″N 084°48′41″W	
KFPR	FPR	Treasure Coast International Airport	Fort Pierce	Florida	27°29′42″N 080°22′06″W	
KFPY	FPY	Perry–Foley Airport	Perry	Florida	30°04′20″N 083°34′42″W	
KFQD		Rutherford County Airport (Marchman Field)	Rutherfordton	North Carolina	35°25′48″N 081°56′06″W	
KFRG	FRG	Republic Airport	East Farmingdale	New York	40°43′44″N 073°24′48″W	
KFRH		French Lick Municipal Airport	French Lick	Indiana	38°30′22″N 086°38′13″W	
KFRI	FRI	Marshall Army Airfield	Fort Riley / Junction City	Kansas	39°03′09″N 096°45′52″W	
KFRM		Fairmont Municipal Airport	Fairmont	Minnesota	43°38′38″N 094°24′56″W	
KFRR		Front Royal-Warren County Airport	Front Royal	Virginia	38°55′03″N 078°15′12″W	
KFSD	FSD	Sioux Falls Regional Airport (Joe Foss Field)	Sioux Falls	South Dakota	43°34′55″N 096°44′31″W	
KFSE		Fosston Municipal Airport	Fosston	Minnesota	47°35′34″N 095°46′25″W	
KFSI	FSI	Henry Post Army Airfield	Fort Sill / Lawton	Oklahoma	34°38′59″N 098°24′08″W	
KFSK		Fort Scott Municipal Airport	Fort Scott	Kansas	37°47′54″N 094°46′10″W	
KFSM	FSM	Fort Smith Regional Airport	Fort Smith	Arkansas	35°20′12″N 094°22′03″W	
KFSO		Franklin County State Airport	Highgate	Vermont	44°56′25″N 073°05′51″W	
KFST		Fort Stockton-Pecos County Airport	Fort Stockton	Texas	30°54′55″N 102°54′46″W	
KFSU		Fort Sumner Municipal Airport	Fort Sumner	New Mexico	34°29′16″N 104°13′01″W	
KFSW		Fort Madison Municipal Airport	Fort Madison	Iowa	40°39′33″N 091°19′40″W	
KFTK	FTK	Godman Army Airfield	Fort Knox	Kentucky	37°54′25″N 085°58′20″W	
KFTT		Elton Hensley Memorial Airport	Fulton	Missouri	38°50′31″N 092°00′08″W	
KFTW	FTW	Fort Worth Meacham International Airport	Fort Worth	Texas	32°49′11″N 097°21′45″W	
KFTY	FTY	Fulton County Airport (Charlie Brown Field)	Atlanta	Georgia	33°46′45″N 084°31′17″W	
KFUL		Fullerton Municipal Airport	Fullerton	California	33°52′19″N 117°58′47″W	
KFVE	WFK	Northern Aroostook Regional Airport	Frenchville	Maine	47°17′08″N 068°18′46″W	
KFVX		Farmville Regional Airport	Farmville	Virginia	37°21′27″N 078°26′16″W	
KFWA	FWA	Fort Wayne International Airport	Fort Wayne	Indiana	40°58′42″N 085°11′43″W	
KFWB		Branson West Airport	Branson West	Missouri	36°41′55″N 093°24′08″W	
KFWC		Fairfield Municipal Airport	Fairfield	Illinois	38°22′43″N 088°24′46″W	
KFWN		Sussex Airport	Sussex	New Jersey	41°12′01″N 074°37′23″W	
KFWQ	FWQ	Rostraver Airport	Monongahela	Pennsylvania	40°12′35″N 079°49′53″W	
KFWS		Fort Worth Spinks Airport	Fort Worth	Texas	32°33′55″N 097°18′29″W	
KFXE		Fort Lauderdale Executive Airport	Fort Lauderdale	Florida	26°11′50″N 080°10′15″W	
KFXY		Forest City Municipal Airport	Forest City	Iowa	43°14′05″N 093°37′27″W	
KFYE		Fayette County Airport	Somerville	Tennessee	35°12′28″N 089°23′40″W	
KFYG		Washington Regional Airport	Washington	Missouri	38°35′15″N 090°59′38″W	
KFYJ		Middle Peninsula Regional Airport	West Point	Virginia	37°31′17″N 076°45′46″W	
KFYM		Fayetteville Municipal Airport	Fayetteville	Tennessee	35°03′35″N 086°33′50″W	
KFYV	FYV	Drake Field (Fayetteville Executive Airport)	Fayetteville	Arkansas	36°00′18″N 094°10′12″W	
KFZG		Fitzgerald Municipal Airport	Fitzgerald	Georgia	31°40′59″N 083°16′16″W	
KFZI		Fostoria Metropolitan Airport	Fostoria	Ohio	41°11′27″N 083°23′40″W	
KFZY		Oswego County Airport	Fulton	New York	43°21′03″N 076°23′17″W	

== KG ==
ICAO	IATA	Airport name	Community	State	Coordinates	Notes
KGAB		Gabbs Airport	Gabbs	Nevada	38°55′27″N 117°57′32″W	
KGAD		Northeast Alabama Regional Airport	Gadsden	Alabama	33°58′22″N 086°05′21″W	
KGAF	GAF	Grafton Municipal Airport	Grafton	North Dakota	48°24′20″N 097°21′57″W	
KGAG		Gage Airport	Gage	Oklahoma	36°17′44″N 099°46′35″W	
KGAI		Montgomery County Airpark	Gaithersburg	Maryland	39°10′06″N 077°09′58″W	
KGAO		South Lafourche Leonard Miller Jr. Airport	Lafourche Parish	Louisiana	29°26′28″N 090°15′40″W	
KGAS		Gallia–Meigs Regional Airport	Gallipolis	Ohio	38°50′03″N 082°09′48″W	
KGAX		Williams Auxiliary Airfield 6	Gila Bend	Arizona	32°53′05″N 112°49′00″W	
KGBD		Great Bend Municipal Airport	Great Bend	Kansas	38°20′39″N 098°51′33″W	
KGBG	GBG	Galesburg Municipal Airport	Galesburg	Illinois	40°56′17″N 090°25′52″W	
KGXF		Gila Bend Air Force Auxiliary Field	Gila Bend	Arizona	32°53′15″N 112°43′12″W	
KGBR		Walter J. Koladza Airport (Great Barrington Airport)	Great Barrington	Massachusetts	42°11′03″N 073°24′12″W	
KGCC	GCC	Gillette-Campbell County Airport	Gillette	Wyoming	44°20′56″N 105°32′22″W	
KGCD		Seneca Emergency Airstrip	Seneca	Oregon	44°08′17″N 118°58′57″W	
KGCK	GCK	Garden City Regional Airport	Garden City	Kansas	37°55′39″N 100°43′28″W	
KGCM		Claremore Regional Airport	Claremore	Oklahoma	36°17′34″N 095°28′47″W	
KGCN	GCN	Grand Canyon National Park Airport	Grand Canyon National Park	Arizona	35°57′08″N 112°08′49″W	
KGCT		Guthrie County Regional Airport	Guthrie Center	Iowa	41°41′16″N 094°26′07″W	
KGCY	GCY	Greeneville–Greene County Municipal Airport	Greeneville	Tennessee	36°11′44″N 082°48′41″W	
KGDA		Marion-Crittenden County James C. Johnson Regional Airport	Marion	Kentucky	37°20′11″N 088°06′35″W	
KGDB		Granite Falls Municipal Airport	Granite Falls	Minnesota	44°45′12″N 095°33′22″W	
KGDJ	GDJ	Granbury Regional Airport	Granbury	Texas	32°26′40″N 097°49′01″W	
KGDK		Greene County-Lewis A. Jackson Regional Airport	Dayton	Ohio	39°41′27″N 083°59′33″W	
KGDM	GDM	Gardner Municipal Airport	Gardner	Massachusetts	42°33′00″N 072°00′58″W	
KGDP		Dell City Municipal Airport	Dell City	Texas	31°56′51″N 105°11′30″W	
KGDV		Dawson Community Airport	Glendive	Montana	47°08′19″N 104°48′26″W	
KGDW	GDW	Gladwin Zettel Memorial Airport	Gladwin	Michigan	43°58′17″N 084°28′44″W	
KGDY		Grundy Municipal Airport	Grundy	Virginia	37°13′57″N 082°07′30″W	
KGED		Delaware Coastal Airport (Georgetown Airport)	Georgetown	Delaware	38°41′16″N 075°21′30″W	
KGEG	GEG	Spokane International Airport	Spokane	Washington	47°37′12″N 117°32′02″W	
KGEO		Brown County Airport	Georgetown	Ohio	38°52′55″N 083°52′58″W	
KGEU		Glendale Municipal Airport	Glendale	Arizona	33°31′37″N 112°17′42″W	
KGEV		Ashe County Airport	Jefferson	North Carolina	36°25′57″N 081°25′11″W	
KGEY	GEY	South Big Horn County Airport	Greybull	Wyoming	44°31′05″N 108°04′59″W	
KGEZ		Shelbyville Municipal Airport	Shelbyville	Indiana	39°35′10″N 085°48′14″W	
KGFA	GFA	Malmstrom Air Force Base	Great Falls	Montana	47°30′17″N 111°11′14″W	
KGFD	GFD	Pope Field	Greenfield	Indiana	39°47′27″N 085°44′06″W	
KGFK	GFK	Grand Forks International Airport	Grand Forks	North Dakota	47°56′57″N 097°10′34″W	
KGFL	GFL	Floyd Bennett Memorial Airport	Glens Falls	New York	43°20′28″N 073°36′37″W	
KGFZ		Greenfield Municipal Airport	Greenfield	Iowa	41°19′37″N 094°26′45″W	
KGGE		Georgetown County Airport	Georgetown	South Carolina	33°18′41″N 079°19′13″W	
KGGF		Grant Municipal Airport	Grant	Nebraska	40°52′14″N 101°44′02″W	
KGGG	GGG	East Texas Regional Airport	Longview	Texas	32°23′02″N 094°42′41″W	
KGGI		Grinnell Regional Airport (Billy Robinson Field)	Grinnell	Iowa	41°42′35″N 092°44′09″W	
KGGP		Logansport/Cass County Airport	Logansport	Indiana	40°42′40″N 086°22′30″W	
KGGW	GGW	Glasgow Airport	Glasgow	Montana	48°12′45″N 106°36′53″W	
KGHG	GHG	Marshfield Municipal Airport (George Harlow Field)	Marshfield	Massachusetts	42°05′54″N 070°40′20″W	
KGHM		Centerville Municipal Airport	Centerville	Tennessee	35°50′14″N 087°26′43″W	
KGHW		Glenwood Municipal Airport	Glenwood	Minnesota	45°38′38″N 095°19′13″W	
KGIC		Idaho County Airport	Grangeville	Idaho	45°56′33″N 116°07′24″W	
KGIF		Winter Haven's Gilbert Airport (Gilbert Field)	Winter Haven	Florida	28°03′46″N 081°45′12″W	
KGJT	GJT	Grand Junction Regional Airport (Walker Field)	Grand Junction	Colorado	39°07′21″N 108°31′36″W	
KGKJ		Port Meadville Airport	Meadville	Pennsylvania	41°37′36″N 080°12′53″W	
KGKT	GKT	Gatlinburg-Pigeon Forge Airport	Sevier County	Tennessee	35°51′28″N 083°31′43″W	
KGKY		Arlington Municipal Airport	Arlington	Texas	32°39′50″N 097°05′39″W	
KGLD		Goodland Municipal Airport (Renner Field)	Goodland	Kansas	39°22′14″N 101°41′56″W	
KGLE	GLE	Gainesville Municipal Airport	Gainesville	Texas	33°39′05″N 097°11′49″W	
KGLH	GLH	Mid Delta Regional Airport	Greenville	Mississippi	33°28′58″N 090°59′08″W	
KGLR	GLR	Gaylord Regional Airport	Gaylord	Michigan	45°00′49″N 084°42′13″W	
KGLS	GLS	Scholes International Airport at Galveston	Galveston	Texas	29°15′55″N 094°51′38″W	
KGLW		Glasgow Municipal Airport	Glasgow	Kentucky	37°01′54″N 085°57′14″W	
KGLY		Clinton Memorial Airport	Clinton	Missouri	38°21′24″N 093°41′03″W	
KGMJ		Grove Municipal Airport	Grove	Oklahoma	36°36′24″N 094°44′19″W	
KGMU		Greenville Downtown Airport	Greenville	South Carolina	34°50′53″N 082°21′00″W	
KGNB		Granby-Grand County Airport	Granby	Colorado	40°05′22″N 105°54′56″W	
KGNC		Gaines County Airport	Seminole	Texas	32°40′36″N 102°38′48″W	
KGNF		Grenada Municipal Airport	Grenada	Mississippi	33°49′57″N 089°47′53″W	
KGNG		Gooding Municipal Airport	Gooding	Idaho	42°55′05″N 114°45′55″W	
KGNI		Grand Isle Seaplane Base	Grand Isle	Louisiana	29°15′46″N 089°57′40″W	
KGNT		Grants-Milan Municipal Airport	Grants	New Mexico	35°10′00″N 107°54′02″W	
KGNV	GNV	Gainesville Regional Airport	Gainesville	Florida	29°41′24″N 082°16′18″W	
KGOF	GOF	Goodfellow Air Force Base	San Angelo	Texas	31°25′53″N 100°23′56″W	Closed
KGOK		Guthrie-Edmond Regional Airport	Guthrie	Oklahoma	35°51′05″N 097°24′58″W	
KGON	GON	Groton-New London Airport	Groton / New London	Connecticut	41°19′48″N 072°02′42″W	
KGOO		Nevada County Air Park (Nevada County Airport)	Grass Valley	California	39°13′26″N 121°00′11″W	
KGOP		Gatesville Municipal Airport	Gatesville	Texas	31°25′17″N 097°47′49″W	
KGOV		Grayling Army Airfield	Grayling	Michigan	44°40′49″N 084°43′44″W	
KGPC		Putnam County Regional Airport	Greencastle	Indiana	39°37′57″N 086°48′50″W	
KGPH		Midwest National Air Center	Mosby	Missouri	39°19′57″N 094°18′35″W	
KGPI	FCA	Glacier Park International Airport	Kalispell	Montana	48°18′38″N 114°15′22″W	Also KFCA
KGPM		Grand Prairie Municipal Airport	Grand Prairie	Texas	32°41′56″N 097°02′49″W	
KGPT	GPT	Gulfport-Biloxi International Airport	Gulfport	Mississippi	30°24′26″N 089°04′12″W	
KGPZ	GPZ	Grand Rapids-Itasca County Airport	Grand Rapids	Minnesota	47°12′40″N 093°30′35″W	
KGQQ	GQQ	Galion Municipal Airport	Galion	Ohio	40°45′12″N 082°43′26″W	
KGRB	GRB	Austin Straubel International Airport	Green Bay	Wisconsin	44°29′05″N 088°07′47″W	
KGRD		Greenwood County Airport	Greenwood	South Carolina	34°14′55″N 082°09′33″W	
KGRE	GRE	Greenville Airport	Greenville	Illinois	38°50′10″N 089°22′45″W	
KGRF	GRF	Gray Army Airfield	Fort Lewis	Washington	47°04′45″N 122°34′51″W	
KGRI	GRI	Central Nebraska Regional Airport	Grand Island	Nebraska	40°58′03″N 098°18′35″W	
KGRK	GRK	Killeen Regional Airport / Robert Gray Army Airfield	Fort Cavazos / Killeen	Texas	31°04′02″N 097°49′44″W	
KGRN		Gordon Municipal Airport	Gordon	Nebraska	42°48′15″N 102°10′40″W	
KGRR	GRR	Gerald R. Ford International Airport	Grand Rapids	Michigan	42°52′51″N 085°31′22″W	
KGSB	GSB	Seymour Johnson Air Force Base	Goldsboro	North Carolina	35°20′28″N 077°58′00″W	
KGSH	GSH	Goshen Municipal Airport	Goshen	Indiana	41°31′35″N 085°47′39″W	
KGSO	GSO	Piedmont Triad International Airport	Greensboro	North Carolina	36°05′52″N 079°56′14″W	
KGSP	GSP	Greenville-Spartanburg International Airport	Greer	South Carolina	34°53′44″N 082°13′08″W	
KGSW		Greater Southwest International Airport	Fort Worth	Texas	32°49′53″N 097°02′57″W	Closed 1970s
KGTB	GTB	Wheeler-Sack Army Airfield	Fort Drum	New York	44°03′20″N 075°43′10″W	
KGTE		Gothenburg Municipal Airport	Gothenburg	Nebraska	40°55′39″N 100°08′49″W	
KGTF	GTF	Great Falls International Airport	Great Falls	Montana	47°28′58″N 111°22′14″W	
KGTG		Grantsburg Municipal Airport	Grantsburg	Wisconsin	45°47′54″N 092°39′52″W	
KGTR		Golden Triangle Regional Airport	Columbus	Mississippi	33°26′54″N 088°35′29″W	
KGTU		Georgetown Municipal Airport	Georgetown	Texas	30°40′44″N 097°40′46″W	
KGUC	GUC	Gunnison-Crested Butte Regional Airport	Gunnison	Colorado	38°32′02″N 106°55′59″W	
KGUP	GUP	Gallup Municipal Airport	Gallup	New Mexico	35°30′40″N 108°47′22″W	
KGUR	GUR	Camp Guernsey Airport	Guernsey	Wyoming	42°15′45″N 104°43′55″W	
KGUS	GUS	Grissom Air Reserve Base	Peru	Indiana	40°38′53″N 086°09′08″W	
KGUY		Guymon Municipal Airport	Guymon	Oklahoma	36°41′06″N 101°30′28″W	
KGVE		Gordonsville Municipal Airport	Gordonsville	Virginia	38°09′22″N 078°09′57″W	
KGVL	GVL	Lee Gilmer Memorial Airport	Gainesville	Georgia	34°16′21″N 083°49′49″W	
KGVQ		Genesee County Airport	Batavia	New York	43°01′54″N 078°10′11″W	
KGVT		Majors Airport	Greenville	Texas	33°04′04″N 096°03′55″W	
KGWB		DeKalb County Airport	Auburn	Indiana	41°18′26″N 085°03′52″W	
KGWN		Winn Army Community Hospital Helipad	Fort Stewart	Georgia	31°52′27″N 081°35′48″W	
KGWO	GWO	Greenwood-Leflore Airport	Greenwood	Mississippi	33°29′39″N 090°05′05″W	
KGWR		Gwinner-Roger Melroe Field (Gwinner Municipal Airfield)	Gwinner	North Dakota	46°13′07″N 097°38′37″W	
KGWS		Glenwood Springs Municipal Airport	Glenwood Springs	Colorado	39°30′22″N 107°18′33″W	
KGWW	GWW	Goldsboro-Wayne Municipal Airport	Goldsboro	North Carolina	35°27′38″N 077°57′54″W	
KGXA		Gray Butte Field	Lake Los Angeles	California	34°34′00″N 117°40′14″W	
KGXF		Gila Bend Air Force Auxiliary Field	Gila Bend	Arizona	32°53′15″N 112°43′12″W	
KGXY		Greeley-Weld County Airport	Greeley	Colorado	40°26′15″N 104°37′59″W	
KGYB		Giddings-Lee County Airport	Giddings	Texas	30°10′09″N 096°58′48″W	
KGYH		Donaldson Center Airport	Greenville	South Carolina	34°45′30″N 082°22′35″W	
KGYI	GYI	North Texas Regional Airport (Perrin Field)	Denison	Texas	33°42′51″N 096°40′25″W	
KGYL		Glencoe Municipal Airport	Glencoe	Minnesota	44°45′22″N 094°04′53″W	
KGYR		Phoenix Goodyear Airport	Goodyear	Arizona	33°25′41″N 112°22′28″W	
KGYY	GYY	Gary/Chicago International Airport	Gary	Indiana	41°36′59″N 087°24′46″W	
KGZH		Middleton Field	Evergreen, Conecuh County	Alabama	31°24′57″N 087°02′39″W	
KGZL		Stigler Regional Airport	Stigler	Oklahoma	35°17′17″N 095°05′38″W	
KGZN		Gregory M. Simmons Memorial Airport	Cisco	Texas	32°22′02″N 099°01′25″W	
KGZS		Abernathy Field	Pulaski	Tennessee	35°09′13″N 087°03′24″W	

== KH ==
ICAO	IATA	Airport name	Community	State	Coordinates	Notes
KHAB		Marion County – Rankin Fite Airport	Hamilton	Alabama	34°07′03″N 087°59′54″W	
KHAD		Harford Airport	Casper	Wyoming	42°55′25″N 106°18′36″W	
KHAE	HAE	Hannibal Regional Airport (William P. Lear Field)	Hannibal	Missouri	39°43′31″N 091°26′38″W	
KHAF		Eddie Andreini Sr. Airfield (Half Moon Bay Airport)	Half Moon Bay	California	37°30′48″N 122°30′04″W	
KHAI	HAI	Three Rivers Municipal Dr. Haines Airport	Three Rivers	Michigan	41°57′35″N 085°35′35″W	
KHAO	HAO	Butler County Regional Airport (Hogan Field)	Hamilton	Ohio	39°21′50″N 084°31′19″W	
KHAX	HAX	Hatbox Field	Muskogee	Oklahoma	35°44′45″N 095°24′46″W	Closed
KHBC		Mohall Municipal Airport	Mohall	North Dakota	48°46′08″N 101°32′16″W	
KHBE		Himsel Army Airfield	Nineveh	Indiana	39°20′22″N 086°01′47″W	
KHBG		Hattiesburg Bobby L. Chain Municipal Airport	Hattiesburg	Mississippi	31°15′54″N 089°15′10″W	
KHBI		Asheboro Regional Airport	Asheboro	North Carolina	35°39′16″N 079°53′41″W	
KHBR		Hobart Regional Airport	Hobart	Oklahoma	34°59′29″N 099°03′05″W	
KHBV		Jim Hogg County Airport	Hebbronville	Texas	27°20′59″N 098°44′13″W	
KHBW		Joshua Sanford Field	Hillsboro	Wisconsin	43°39′24″N 090°19′41″W	Closed
KHBZ		Heber Springs Municipal Airport	Heber Springs	Arkansas	35°30′42″N 092°00′47″W	
KHCD		Hutchinson Municipal Airport (Butler Field)	Hutchinson	Minnesota	44°51′36″N 094°22′57″W	
KHCO		Hallock Municipal Airport	Hallock	Minnesota	48°45′10″N 096°56′35″W	
KHCR		Russ McDonald Field	Heber City	Utah	40°28′54″N 111°25′44″W	
KHDC		Hammond Northshore Regional Airport	Hammond	Louisiana	30°31′18″N 090°25′06″W	
KHDE		Brewster Field	Holdrege	Nebraska	40°27′10″N 099°20′14″W	
KHDI		Hardwick Field	Cleveland	Tennessee	35°13′12″N 084°49′57″W	Closed
KHDL		Headland Municipal Airport	Headland	Alabama	31°21′51″N 085°18′45″W	
KHDN	HDN	Yampa Valley Airport	Hayden	Colorado	40°28′52″N 107°13′04″W	
KHDO	HDO	South Texas Regional Airport at Hondo	Hondo	Texas	29°21′33″N 099°10′39″W	
KHEE		Thompson-Robbins Airport	Helena	Arkansas	34°34′35″N 090°40′33″W	
KHEF		Manassas Regional Airport (Harry P. Davis Field)	Manassas	Virginia	38°43′17″N 077°30′56″W	
KHEG		Herlong Recreational Airport	Jacksonville	Florida	30°16′40″N 081°48′21″W	
KHEI		Hettinger Municipal Airport	Hettinger	North Dakota	46°00′54″N 102°39′22″W	
KHEQ		Holyoke Airport	Holyoke	Colorado	40°34′37″N 102°16′40″W	
KHES		Healdsburg Municipal Airport	Healdsburg	California	38°39′13″N 122°53′58″W	
KHEY	HEY	Hanchey Army Heliport	Fort Novosel / Ozark	Alabama	31°20′46″N 085°39′16″W	
KHEZ		Natchez-Adams County Airport (Hardy-Anders Field)	Natchez	Mississippi	31°36′49″N 091°17′50″W	
KHFD	HFD	Hartford-Brainard Airport	Hartford	Connecticut	41°44′12″N 072°38′58″W	
KHFF		Mackall Army Airfield	Camp Mackall	North Carolina	35°02′11″N 079°29′51″W	
KHFJ		Monett Municipal Airport	Monett	Missouri	36°54′22″N 094°00′46″W	
KHFY		Indy South Greenwood Airport	Greenwood	Indiana	39°37′39″N 086°05′17″W	
KHGR	HGR	Hagerstown Regional Airport	Hagerstown	Maryland	39°42′31″N 077°43′35″W	
KHGT	HGT	Tusi Army Heliport	Fort Hunter Liggett	California	35°59′37″N 121°14′13″W	
KHHF		Hemphill County Airport	Canadian	Texas	35°53′47″N 100°24′10″W	
KHHG		Huntington Municipal Airport	Huntington	Indiana	40°51′11″N 085°27′25″W	
KHHR	HHR	Hawthorne Municipal Airport (Jack Northrop Field)	Hawthorne	California	33°55′22″N 118°20′07″W	
KHHW		Stan Stamper Municipal Airport	Hugo	Oklahoma	34°02′05″N 095°32′31″W	
KHIB	HIB	Range Regional Airport	Hibbing	Minnesota	47°23′12″N 092°50′20″W	
KHIE		Mount Washington Regional Airport	Whitefield	New Hampshire	44°22′03″N 071°32′40″W	
KHIF	HIF	Hill Air Force Base	Ogden	Utah	41°07′26″N 111°58′22″W	
KHIG		Higginsville Industrial Municipal Airport	Higginsville	Missouri	39°04′22″N 093°40′39″W	
KHII		Lake Havasu City Airport	Lake Havasu City	Arizona	34°34′16″N 114°21′30″W	
KHIO		Hillsboro Airport	Portland	Oregon	45°32′25″N 122°56′59″W	
KHJH		Hebron Municipal Airport	Hebron	Nebraska	40°09′01″N 097°35′13″W	
KHJO	HJO	Hanford Municipal Airport	Hanford	California	36°19′00″N 119°37′40″W	
KHKA		Blytheville Municipal Airport	Blytheville	Arkansas	35°56′26″N 089°49′51″W	
KHKS		Hawkins Field	Jackson	Mississippi	32°20′05″N 090°13′21″W	
KHKY	HKY	Hickory Regional Airport	Hickory	North Carolina	35°44′28″N 081°23′22″W	
KHLB	HLB	Batesville Airport	Batesville	Indiana	39°20′34″N 085°15′30″W	
KHLC		Hill City Municipal Airport	Hill City	Kansas	39°22′49″N 099°49′53″W	
KHLG		Wheeling-Ohio County Airport	Wheeling	West Virginia	40°10′30″N 080°38′47″W	
KHLM	HLM	Park Township Airport	Holland	Michigan	42°47′45″N 086°09′43″W	Closed
KHLN	HLN	Helena Regional Airport	Helena	Montana	46°36′24″N 111°58′58″W	
KHLR	HLR	Yoakum–DeFrenn Army Heliport	Fort Cavazos / Killeen	Texas	31°08′19″N 097°42′52″W	
KHLX		Twin County Airport	Galax-Hillsville	Virginia	36°45′57″N 080°49′24″W	
KHMN	HMN	Holloman Air Force Base	Alamogordo	New Mexico	32°51′09″N 106°06′23″W	
KHMP		Atlanta Speedway Airport	Hampton	Georgia	33°23′21″N 084°19′56″W	
KHMT		Hemet-Ryan Airport	Hemet	California	33°44′02″N 117°01′21″W	
KHMY		Muldrow Army Heliport	Lexington	Oklahoma	35°01′35″N 097°13′54″W	
KHMZ		Bedford County Airport	Bedford	Pennsylvania	40°05′10″N 078°30′49″W	
KHNB	HNB	Huntingburg Airport	Huntingburg	Indiana	38°14′56″N 086°57′13″W	
KHND	HSH	Henderson Executive Airport	Henderson	Nevada	35°58′22″N 115°08′04″W	
KHNR		Harlan Municipal Airport	Harlan	Iowa	41°35′04″N 095°20′23″W	
KHNZ		Henderson-Oxford Airport	Oxford	North Carolina	36°21′42″N 078°31′45″W	
KHOB	HOB	Lea County Regional Airport	Hobbs	New Mexico	32°41′15″N 103°13′01″W	
KHOC		Highland County Airport	Hillsboro	Ohio	39°11′19″N 083°32′19″W	
KHOE		Homerville Airport	Homerville	Georgia	31°03′21″N 082°46′27″W	
KHON	HON	Huron Regional Airport	Huron	South Dakota	44°23′07″N 098°13′43″W	
KHOP	HOP	Campbell Army Airfield	Fort Campbell	Kentucky	36°40′20″N 087°29′33″W	
KHOT	HOT	Memorial Field Airport	Hot Springs	Arkansas	34°28′41″N 093°05′46″W	
KHOU	HOU	William P. Hobby Airport	Houston	Texas	29°38′44″N 095°16′44″W	
KHPN	HPN	Westchester County Airport	White Plains	New York	41°04′01″N 073°42′27″W	
KHPT	HPT	Hampton Municipal Airport	Hampton	Iowa	42°43′25″N 093°13′35″W	
KHPY	HPY	Baytown Airport	Baytown	Texas	29°47′10″N 094°57′10″W	
KHQG		Hugoton Municipal Airport	Hugoton	Kansas	37°09′47″N 101°22′14″W	
KHQM	HQM	Bowerman Airport	Hoquiam	Washington	46°58′16″N 123°56′12″W	
KHQU		Thomson-McDuffie County Airport	Thomson	Georgia	33°31′47″N 082°31′01″W	
KHQZ	HQZ	Mesquite Metro Airport	Mesquite	Texas	32°44′49″N 096°31′50″W	
KHRF		Ravalli County Airport	Hamilton	Montana	46°15′05″N 114°07′32″W	
KHRI		Hermiston Municipal Airport	Hermiston	Oregon	45°49′42″N 119°15′33″W	
KHRJ	HRJ	Harnett Regional Jetport	Erwin	North Carolina	35°22′49″N 078°43′56″W	
KHRL	HRL	Valley International Airport	Harlingen	Texas	26°13′38″N 097°39′18″W	
KHRO	HRO	Boone County Airport	Harrison	Arkansas	36°15′41″N 093°09′17″W	
KHRT		Hurlburt Field	Okaloosa County	Florida	30°25′40″N 086°41′22″W	
KHRU	HRU	Herington Regional Airport	Herington	Kansas	38°41′41″N 096°48′29″W	
KHRX		Hereford Municipal Airport	Hereford	Texas	34°51′26″N 102°19′41″W	
KHSA		Stennis International Airport	Bay St. Louis	Mississippi	30°22′04″N 089°27′17″W	
KHSB	HSB	Harrisburg-Raleigh Airport	Harrisburg	Illinois	37°48′41″N 088°32′56″W	
KHSD		Sundance Airport	Oklahoma City	Oklahoma	35°36′07″N 097°42′22″W	
KHSE		Billy Mitchell Airport	Hatteras	North Carolina	35°13′58″N 075°37′04″W	
KHSG	THP	Hot Springs County–Thermopolis Municipal Airport	Thermopolis	Wyoming	43°43′03″N 108°22′49″W	
KHSI		Hastings Municipal Airport	Hastings	Nebraska	40°36′19″N 098°25′40″W	
KHSP	HSP	Ingalls Field	Hot Springs	Virginia	37°57′05″N 079°50′02″W	
KHSR		Hot Springs Municipal Airport	Hot Springs	South Dakota	43°22′06″N 103°23′18″W	
KHST	HST	Homestead Air Reserve Base	Homestead	Florida	25°29′18″N 080°23′01″W	
KHSV	HSV	Huntsville International Airport (Carl T. Jones Field)	Huntsville	Alabama	34°38′14″N 086°46′30″W	
KHTF		Hornell Municipal Airport	Hornell	New York	42°22′56″N 077°40′56″W	
KHTH	HTH	Hawthorne Industrial Airport	Hawthorne	Nevada	38°32′40″N 118°38′03″W	
KHTL	HTL	Roscommon County–Blodgett Memorial Airport	Houghton Lake	Michigan	44°21′35″N 084°40′16″W	
KHTS	HTS	Tri-State Airport	Huntington	West Virginia	38°22′01″N 082°33′31″W	
KHTW	HTW	Lawrence County Airpark	Chesapeake	Ohio	38°25′09″N 082°29′40″W	
KHUA	HUA	Redstone Army Airfield	Redstone Arsenal / Huntsville	Alabama	34°40′43″N 086°41′05″W	
KHUF	HUF	Terre Haute Regional Airport	Terre Haute	Indiana	39°27′05″N 087°18′27″W	
KHUL		Houlton International Airport	Houlton	Maine	46°07′23″N 067°47′31″W	
KHUM		Houma-Terrebonne Airport	Houma	Louisiana	29°33′59″N 090°39′38″W	
KHUT	HUT	Hutchinson Municipal Airport	Hutchinson	Kansas	38°03′56″N 097°51′38″W	
KHVC		Hopkinsville-Christian County Airport	Hopkinsville	Kentucky	36°51′25″N 087°27′18″W	
KHVE		Hanksville Airport	Hanksville	Utah	38°24′56″N 110°42′06″W	
KHVN	HVN	Tweed-New Haven Airport	New Haven	Connecticut	41°15′50″N 072°53′12″W	
KHVR		Havre City County Airport	Havre	Montana	48°32′35″N 109°45′44″W	
KHVS		Hartsville Regional Airport	Hartsville	South Carolina	34°24′11″N 080°07′09″W	
KHWD	HWD	Hayward Executive Airport	Hayward	California	37°39′32″N 122°07′18″W	
KHWO		North Perry Airport	Hollywood	Florida	26°00′04″N 080°14′27″W	
KHWQ		Wheatland County Airport	Harlowton	Montana	46°26′55″N 109°51′10″W	
KHWV	WSH	Brookhaven Airport	Shirley	New York	40°49′19″N 072°52′01″W	
KHWY	HWY	Warrenton-Fauquier Airport	Warrenton	Virginia	38°35′11″N 077°42′38″W	
KHXD		Hilton Head Airport	Hilton Head Island	South Carolina	32°13′28″N 080°41′51″W	
KHXF		Hartford Municipal Airport	Hartford	Wisconsin	43°21′00″N 088°23′25″W	
KHYA	HYA	Barnstable Municipal Airport	Hyannis	Massachusetts	41°40′10″N 070°16′49″W	
KHYI		San Marcos Regional Airport	San Marcos	Texas	29°53′34″N 097°51′47″W	
KHYR		Sawyer County Airport	Hayward	Wisconsin	46°01′31″N 091°26′39″W	
KHYS	HYS	Hays Regional Airport	Hays	Kansas	38°50′32″N 099°16′23″W	
KHYW		Conway-Horry County Airport	Conway	South Carolina	33°49′42″N 079°07′19″W	
KHYX		Saginaw County H.W. Browne Airport	Saginaw	Michigan	43°26′00″N 083°51′44″W	
KHZD		Carroll County Airport	Huntingdon	Tennessee	36°05′21″N 088°27′48″W	
KHZE		Mercer County Regional Airport	Hazen	North Dakota	47°17′24″N 101°34′52″W	
KHZL		Hazleton Regional Airport	Hazleton	Pennsylvania	40°59′12″N 075°59′42″W	
KHZR		False River Regional Airport	New Roads	Louisiana	30°43′06″N 091°28′43″W	
KHZX		Isedor Iverson Airport	McGregor	Minnesota	46°37′08″N 093°18′35″W	
KHZY	JFN	Northeast Ohio Regional Airport	Jefferson	Ohio	41°46′41″N 080°41′44″W	
