= GMJ =

GMJ may refer to:

- Ghana Medical Journal
- Glasgow Mathematical Journal
- Grove Municipal Airport, Oklahoma
