= Northwest Regional Airport =

Northwest Regional Airport may refer to:

- Northwest Regional Airport (Texas) in Roanoke, Texas, United States
- Northwest Regional Airport (British Columbia) between Terrace and Kitimat, British Columbia, Canada

== See also ==
- Northwest Alabama Regional Airport in Muscle Shoals, Alabama, United States
- Northwest Arkansas Regional Airport in Fayetteville/Springdale, Arkansas, United States
- Northwest Missouri Regional Airport in Maryville, Missouri, United States
