= Fremont Municipal Airport =

Fremont Municipal Airport may refer to:

- Fremont Municipal Airport (Nebraska), an airport serving Fremont, Nebraska, United States (FAA: FET)
- Fremont Municipal Airport (Michigan), an airport serving Fremont, Michigan, United States (FAA: 3FM)
