= Fish River Seaplane Base =

- IATA: none; ICAO: none; FAA LID: 5AL

Summary
- Airport type: Public
- Owner: Stephen M. Albers
- Serves: Fairhope, Alabama
- Elevation AMSL: 3 ft (0.91 m)
- Coordinates: 30°27′00″N 087°48′28″W
- Interactive map of Fish River Seaplane Base

Runways
Direction	Length		Surface
Direction	ft	m	Surface
16W/34W	4,395	1,340	Water
- Source: Federal Aviation Administration

Fish River Seaplane Base (FAA LID: 5AL) is a public-use seaplane base on Fish River in Baldwin County, Alabama, United States. The facility is located nine nautical miles (10 mi, 17 km) southeast of the central business district of Fairhope, Alabama. It has one seaplane landing area designated 16W/34W which measures 4,395 by 200 feet (1,340 x 61 m).

== See also ==
- H. L. Sonny Callahan Airport (30°27′38″N 087°52′37″W)
- List of airports in Alabama
