= Rankin Airport (Missouri) =

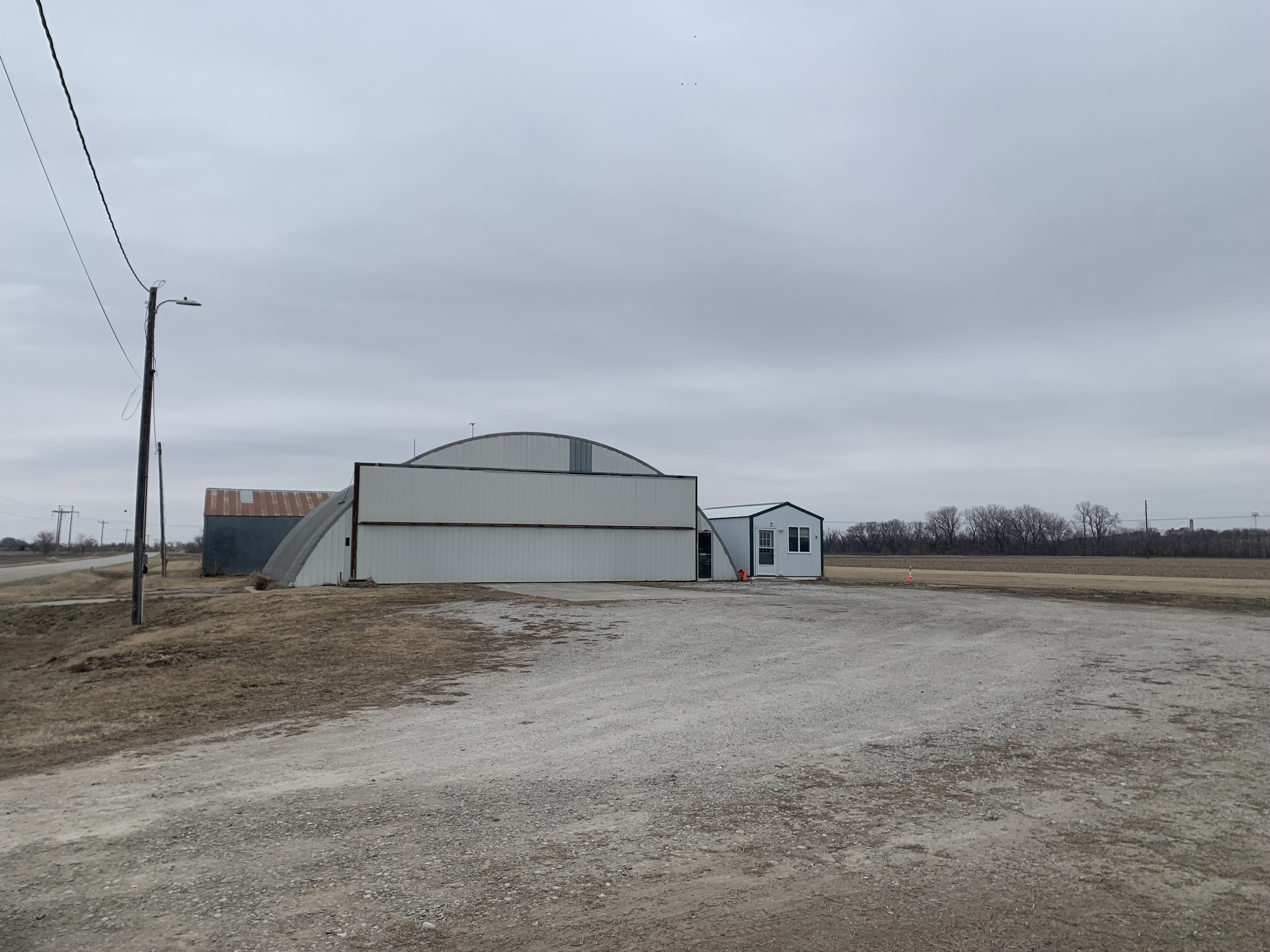
- IATA: none; ICAO: none; FAA LID: 78Y

Summary
- Airport type: Public
- Owner: Kevin Rankin
- Location: Maryville, Missouri
- Elevation AMSL: 976 ft / 297 m
- Coordinates: 40°19′54″N 094°50′05″W
- Interactive map of Rankin Airport

Runways
| Direction | Length | | Surface |
| Direction | ft | m | Surface |
|---|---|---|---|
| 17/35 | 3,050 | 930 | Concrete/Gravel |

Statistics (2007)
- Aircraft operations: 3,100
- Based aircraft: 9
- Source: Federal Aviation Administration

Rankin Airport (FAA LID: 78Y) is a privately owned, public-use airport located three miles (5 km) southeast of the central business district of Maryville, a city in Nodaway County, Missouri, United States.

Located on Jet Road and in the 102 River bottoms it is owned by Joe Rankin, whose family has been involved with this and Maryville's public airport the Northwest Missouri Regional Airport for more than 50 years.

== Maryville School of Aeronautics ==
It is at the site of Maryville's first airport which was established in 1940 to be a Civilian Pilot Training Program base for training pilots during the buildup to World War II. Two weeks after the Attack on Pearl Harbor the airport came under military control in December 1941. Edward G. Schultz, a retired Marine officer who had been in charge of training at the airport, then began training flyers in preparation for military duty. Schultz had been staying the Edward Condon, who had served with Harry Truman in the 129th Field Artillery Regiment during World War I. More than 250 flyers were trained at the airport during its U.S. Army control. Schultz was called to active duty in 1943 was killed in a bombing mission in Hong Kong.

The airport became part of the Naval Shore Station for the U.S. Navy in conjunction with Navy V-5/V-12 training at Northwest Missouri State University during the war. More than 2,000 Navy personnel passed through Maryville at the time.

Near the end of the war Maryville approved a $70,000 bond issue to build the new airport on the west side of town. In appreciation of the Naval air history, Navy planes participated in that airport's dedication in 1946 in an event that was attended by 12,000.

== Facilities and aircraft ==
Rankin Airport covers an area of 25 acres (10 ha) and has one runway designated 17/35 with a 3,050 x 25 ft (930 x 8 m) concrete/gravel surface. For the 12-month period ending September 17, 2007, the airport had 3,100 general aviation aircraft operations, an average of 8 per day. At that time there were 9 aircraft based at this airport: 89% single-engine and 11% ultralight.

== See also ==
- List of airports in Missouri
