= H. L. Sonny Callahan Airport =

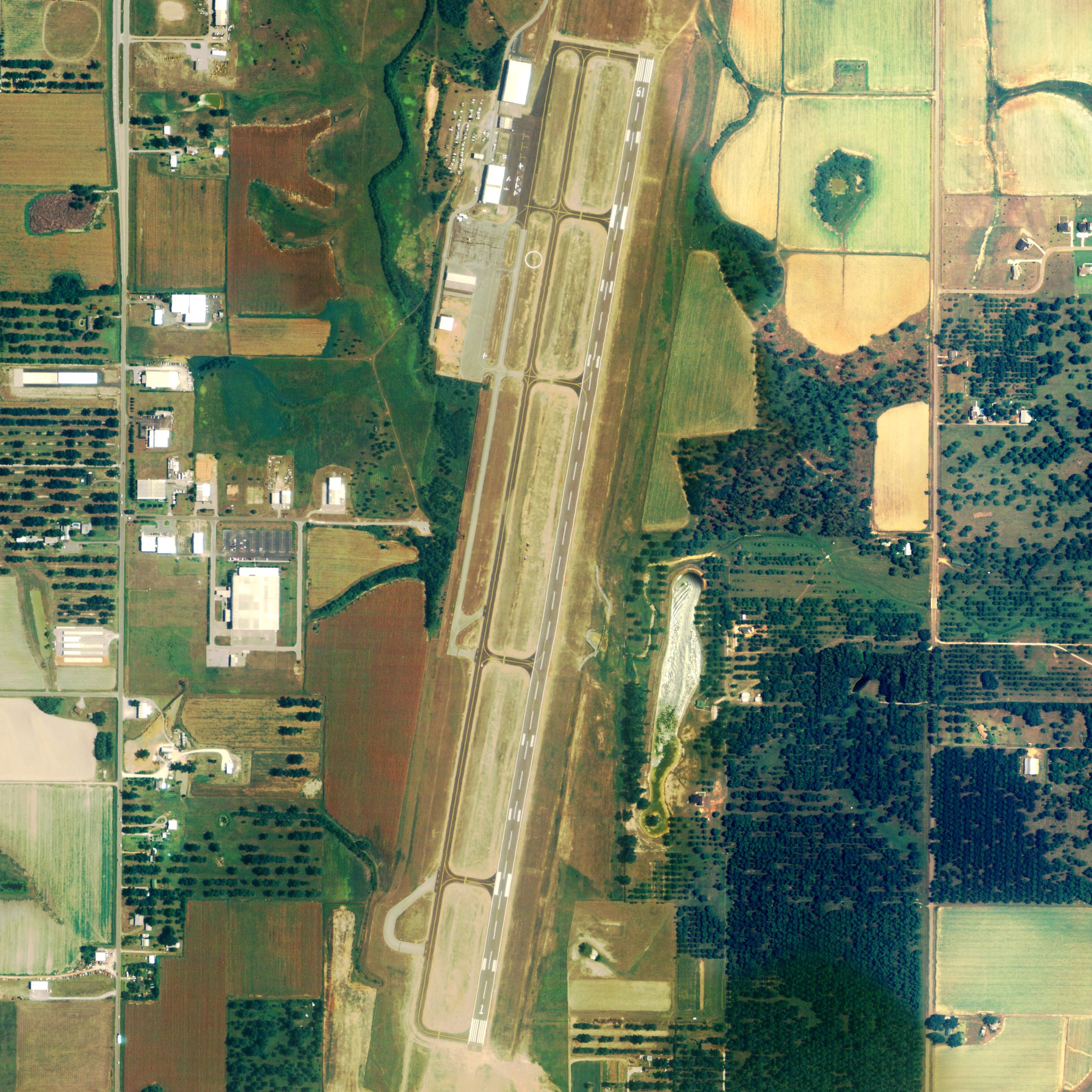
- NAIP aerial image, 30 June 2006
- IATA: none; ICAO: KCQF; FAA LID: CQF

Summary
- Airport type: Public
- Owner: Fairhope Airport Authority
- Serves: Fairhope, Alabama
- Elevation AMSL: 91 ft (28 m)
- Coordinates: 30°27′38″N 087°52′37″W
- Interactive map of H. L. Sonny Callahan Airport

Runways
Direction	Length		Surface
Direction	ft	m	Surface
1/19	6,604	2,013	Asphalt

Statistics (2010)
- Aircraft operations: 46,800
- Based aircraft: 37
- Source: Federal Aviation Administration

H. L. Sonny Callahan Airport (ICAO: KCQF, FAA LID: CQF, formerly 4R4) is a public-use airport located three nautical miles (4 mi, 6 km) southeast of the central business district of Fairhope, a city in Baldwin County, Alabama, United States. It is owned by the Fairhope Airport Authority.

This airport is included in the FAA's National Plan of Integrated Airport Systems for 2011–2015 and 2009–2013, both of which categorized it as a general aviation facility.

Traffic at the airport is primarily corporate and private. Scheduled service for this region is provided by Mobile Regional Airport and Pensacola Regional Airport.

In March, 2007, the city of Fairhope turned over control of the airport to the airport authority and loaned the authority $8.8 million for improvements. The authority expected to use the money to build new hangars and a new terminal.

Although most U.S. airports use the same three-letter location identifier for the FAA and IATA, this airport is assigned CQF by the FAA, but has no designation from the IATA (which assigned CQF to Calais - Dunkerque Airport in France).

== Facilities and aircraft ==
H. L. Sonny Callahan Airport covers an area of 144 acres (58 ha) at an elevation of 91 feet (28 m) above mean sea level. It has one runway designated 1/19 with an asphalt surface measuring 6,604 by 100 feet (2,013 x 30 m).

For the 12-month period ending May 16, 2010, the airport had 46,800 aircraft operations, an average of 128 per day:98% general aviation and 2% military. At that time there were 37 aircraft based at this airport: 76% single-engine, 16% multi-engine, 3% jet and 5% helicopter.

There is a full service fixed-base operator (FBO) on the field. The airport is attended daily, year round from 0600-2000, with afterhours available. The field offers two RNAV (GPS) approaches and one VOR/DME approach.

== See also ==
- Fish River Seaplane Base (30°27′00″N 087°48′28″W)
- List of airports in Alabama
