= O'Sullivan Army Heliport =

- IATA: CSL; ICAO: KCSL; FAA LID: CSL

Summary
- Airport type: Military
- Owner: United States Army
- Location: Camp San Luis Obispo, California
- Elevation AMSL: 250 ft / 76 m
- Coordinates: 35°19′34″N 120°44′35″W
- Interactive map of O'Sullivan Army Heliport

Helipads
Number	Length		Surface
Number	ft	m	Surface
H1	2,430	741	Asphalt
- Source: Federal Aviation Administration

O'Sullivan Army Heliport (ICAO: KCSL, FAA LID: CSL) is a U.S. Army heliport at Camp San Luis Obispo in San Luis Obispo County, California, United States. It is located just off California State Route 1, northwest of the city of San Luis Obispo, about halfway between it and Morro Bay. O'Sullivan AHP has one helipad designated H1 with a 2,430 by 75 ft (741 by 23 m) asphalt surface.
