= Tarboro–Edgecombe Airport =

Public airport serving Tarboro, North Carolina

- IATA: none; ICAO: KETC; FAA LID: ETC

Summary
- Owner: City of Tarboro
- Operator: Tarboro-Edgecombe Airport Authority
- Serves: Tarboro, North Carolina
- Location: Edgecombe County, North Carolina
- Elevation AMSL: 52.6 ft / 16.0 m
- Coordinates: 35°56′14.2″N 77°32′47.3″W
- Interactive map of Tarboro–Edgecombe Airport

Runways
Direction	Length		Surface
Direction	ft	m	Surface
9/27	3,999	1,219	Asphalt

Tarboro–Edgecombe Airport (ICAO: KETC, FAA LID: ETC) is a public, city-owned airport located in Edgecombe County, North Carolina, 2 miles (3.2 km) north of the central business district of the town of Tarboro.

== Operations ==
From May 2023 to May 2024, the airport handled an estimated 102 flights per week, with 38% being transient general aviation aircraft, 38% being local general aviation aircraft, 15% being air taxi services, and 9% being military activity.

There are six aircraft based at Tarboro-Edgecombe as of August 2024, five single-engine aircraft and one twin-engine aircraft. They are stored in a 60-foot by 60-foot hangar.

The airport is operated by a seven-person board called the Tarboro-Edgecombe Airport Authority, run jointly by members of Edgecombe County and the Town of Tarboro.
