= Grove Municipal Airport =

- IATA: none; ICAO: KGMJ; FAA LID: GMJ

Summary
- Airport type: Public
- Owner: City of Grove
- Serves: Grove, Oklahoma
- Elevation AMSL: 831 ft (253 m)
- Coordinates: 36°36′24″N 094°44′19″W
- Website: groveregionalairport.com

Map
- Location of airport in Oklahoma

Runways
| Direction | Length | | Surface |
| Direction | ft | m | Surface |
|---|---|---|---|
| 18/36 | 5,200 | 1,585 | Asphalt |

Statistics (2008)
- Aircraft operations: 22,820
- Based aircraft: 60
- Source: Federal Aviation Administration

Grove Municipal Airport (ICAO: KGMJ, FAA LID: GMJ) is a city-owned, public-use airport located two nautical miles (4 km) northeast of the central business district of Grove, a city in Delaware County, Oklahoma, United States. It is included in the National Plan of Integrated Airport Systems for 2011–2015, which categorized it as a general aviation facility.

Although most U.S. airports use the same three-letter location identifier for the FAA and IATA, this airport is assigned GMJ by the FAA, but has no designation from the IATA.

== Facilities and aircraft ==
Grove Municipal Airport covers an area of 123 acres (50 ha) at an elevation of 831 feet (253 m) above mean sea level. It has one runway designated 18/36 with an asphalt surface measuring 5,200 by 75 feet (1,585 x 23 m).

For the 12-month period ending July 10, 2008, the airport had 22,820 aircraft operations, an average of 62 per day: 99.8% general aviation and 0.2% military. At that time there were 60 aircraft based at this airport: 85% single-engine, 13% multi-engine, and 2% helicopter.
