= Fremont Municipal Airport (Michigan) =

Public airport in Fremont, Michigan

- IATA: none; ICAO: KFFX; FAA LID: FFX

Summary
- Airport type: Public
- Owner: City of Fremont
- Serves: Fremont, Michigan
- Elevation AMSL: 772 ft (235 m)
- Coordinates: 43°26′22″N 085°59′42″W
- Website: CityOfFremont.net/...

Map
- Location of airport in Michigan FFX (the United States)

Runways
| Direction | Length | | Surface |
| Direction | ft | m | Surface |
|---|---|---|---|
| 18/36 | 6,498 | 1,981 | Asphalt |
| 9/27 | 3,502 | 1,067 | Asphalt |

Statistics (2006)
- Aircraft operations: 10,020
- Based aircraft: 36
- Source: Federal Aviation Administration

Fremont Municipal Airport (ICAO: KFFX, FAA LID: FFX, formerly 3FM) is a city-owned public-use airport located three nautical miles (6 km) southwest of the central business district of Fremont, a city in Newaygo County, Michigan, United States. The airport is uncontrolled, and is used for general aviation purposes. Skydiving and ultralight activity are also conducted at the field. It is included in the Federal Aviation Administration (FAA) National Plan of Integrated Airport Systems for 2017–2021, in which it is categorized as a local general aviation facility.

Although most U.S. airports use the same three-letter location identifier for the FAA and IATA, this airport is assigned FFX by the FAA but has no designation from the IATA.

The airport is home to the Michigan chapter of Pilots for Christ International, which provides free transportation by air. The organization is staffed by pilots and funded by donations.

== Facilities and aircraft ==
Fremont Municipal Airport covers an area of 105 acres (42 ha) at an elevation of 772 feet (235 m) above mean sea level. It has two asphalt paved runways: 01/19 is 6,501 by 100 feet (1,982 x 30 m) and 10/28 is 3,502 by 75 feet (1,067 x 23 m).

For the 12-month period ending December 31, 2006, the airport had 8,000 aircraft operations, an average of 22 per day: 99% general aviation and 1% military. At that time there were 31 aircraft based at this airport: 26 single-engine and 2 multi-engine airplanes as well as 1 jet, 1 helicopter, and 1 glider.

== Accidents and incidents ==
- On September 25, 1996, a Beech T-34B impacted terrain following a rapid pitch up and wingover-type maneuver after takeoff. The aircraft reportedly retracted its landing gear 10 feet above the runway and pulled to a 75 to 80 degree climb angle, the turned left past a 90-degree bank. The nose fell as the pilot leveled the wings, and then the pilot reportedly "pulled back hard" as the aircraft neared the ground. The aircraft collided with the ground at a 45-degree angle with the engine at full power. The probable cause was found to be the pilot's failure to maintain adequate airspeed which resulted in a stall.
- On May 18, 2013, a Cessna 182C Skylane performed a forced landing while operating a skydiving flight at Fremont Municipal Airport. While the skydiving flights typically took 20-25 minutes and required 8 gallons of fuel, the accident flight required two additional passes, adding an additional 2-5 minutes to the flight. After releasing the skydivers, the pilot initiated an immediate descent back into the traffic pattern and added carburetor heat after joining the downwind leg. The engine failed after the pilot turned base, and the pilot elected to make a forced landing in an agricultural field adjacent to airport property, after which the nose wheel collapsed and the aircraft nosed over. The probable cause was found to be the pilot's improper preflight planning, which resulted in a loss of engine power due to fuel exhaustion while in the traffic pattern.

== See also ==
- List of airports in Michigan
