= Northwest Missouri Regional Airport =

Airport in northwest Missouri, U.S.

- IATA: none; ICAO: KEVU; FAA LID: EVU

Summary
- Airport type: Public
- Owner: City of Maryville
- Serves: Maryville, Missouri
- Elevation AMSL: 1,145 ft / 349 m
- Coordinates: 40°21′12″N 094°55′0″W
- Interactive map of Northwest Missouri Regional Airport

Runways
| Direction | Length | | Surface |
| Direction | ft | m | Surface |
|---|---|---|---|
| 14/32 | 4,600 | 1,402 | Concrete |

Statistics (2007)
- Aircraft operations: 4,550
- Based aircraft: 19
- Source: Federal Aviation Administration

Northwest Missouri Regional Airport (ICAO: KEVU, FAA LID: EVU) is a city-owned public use airport located two nautical miles (3.7 km) west of the central business district of Maryville, a city in Nodaway County, Missouri, United States. The airport is used for general aviation with no commercial airlines.

Although most U.S. airports use the same three-letter location identifier for the FAA and IATA, this airport is assigned EVU by the FAA but has no designation from the IATA.

== History ==
The airport was formerly Maryville Memorial Airport and was built following World War II. It was renamed in 2003. It has been operated by the Rankin family for several decades. The family also operates the Rankin Airport in the 102 River bottoms on the east side of Maryville.

== Facilities and aircraft ==
Northwest Missouri Regional Airport covers an area of 171 acres (69 ha) at an elevation of 1,150 feet (351 m) above mean sea level. It has one runway designated 14/32 with a concrete surface measuring 4,600 by 75 foot (1,402 x 23 m). The main runway was extended by 600 feet in 2008. The airport's former second runway is now closed; it had been designated 18/36 and had a 2,002 x 45 ft (610 x 14 m) asphalt surface.

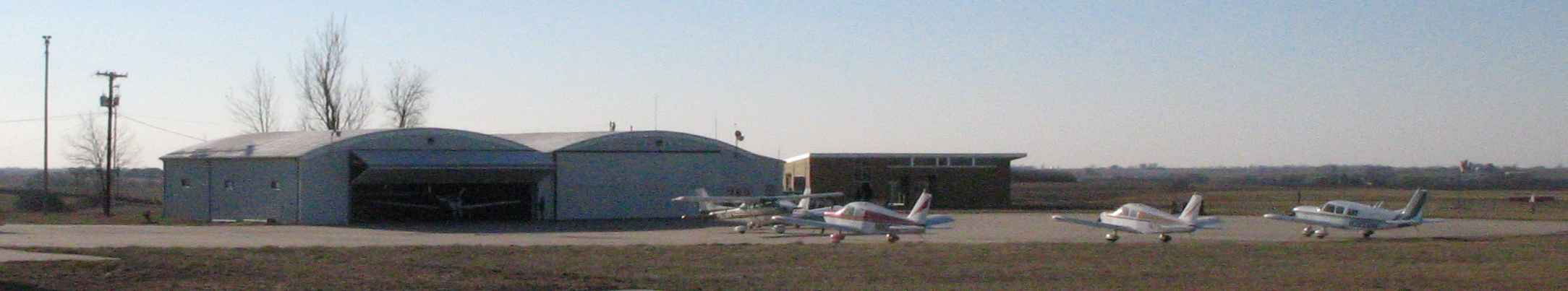
Northwest Missouri Regional Airport (with new terminal under construction in December 2006)

A terminal building was completed in 2007, providing weather information and pilots lounge. The airport was also scheduled to install new lighting and a jet fuel pump in 2009.

For the 12-month period ending September 17, 2007, the airport had 4,550 aircraft operations, an average of 12 per day: 93% general aviation and 7% air taxi. At that time there were 19 aircraft based at this airport: 89% single-engine and 11% multi-engine.

== See also ==
- List of airports in Missouri
