= Davis Airport =

Davis Airport may refer to:

- Davis Airport (Maryland) in Laytonsville, Maryland, United States (FAA: W50)
- Davis Airport (Michigan) in East Lansing, Michigan, United States (FAA: 2D8)
- Davis Airport (Oregon) in Gates, Oregon, United States (FAA: 6S4)

Other airports located in cities named Davis:

- University Airport in Davis, California, United States (FAA: EDU)
- Yolo County Airport in Davis, California, United States (FAA: 2Q3)

== See also ==
- Davis Field (disambiguation)
