= List of airports in Georgia (U.S. state) =

This is a list of airports in Georgia (U.S. state), grouped by type and sorted by location. It contains all public-use and military airports in the state. Some private-use and former airports may be included where notable, such as airports that were previously public-use, those with commercial enplanements recorded by the FAA or airports assigned an IATA airport code.

== Airports ==
This list contains the following information:

- **City served** – The city generally associated with the airport, as per the airport's master record with the Federal Aviation Administration. This is not always the actual location since some airports are located in smaller towns outside of the city they serve. It is not meant to be a complete list of cities served, which can be found in or added to each airport's Wikipedia article.
- **FAA** – The location identifier assigned by the Federal Aviation Administration (FAA). These are linked to each airport's page at the Georgia Department of Transportation.
- **IATA** – The airport code assigned by the International Air Transport Association (IATA). Those that do not match the FAA code are shown in bold.
- **ICAO** – The location indicator assigned by the International Civil Aviation Organization (ICAO).
- **Airport name** – The official airport name. Those shown in **bold** indicate the airport has scheduled passenger service on commercial airlines.
- **Role** – One of four FAA airport categories, as per the 2020–2025 National Plan of Integrated Airport Systems (NPIAS) report released September 2020:
  - P-s: Commercial service – primary are publicly owned airports that receive scheduled passenger service and have more than 10,000 passenger boardings (enplanements) each year. Each primary airport is sub-classified by the FAA as one of the following four "hub" types (s):
    - L: Large hub that accounts for at least 1% of total U.S. passenger enplanements.
    - M: Medium hub that accounts for between 0.25% and 1% of total U.S. passenger enplanements.
    - S: Small hub that accounts for between 0.05% and 0.25% of total U.S. passenger enplanements.
    - N: Nonhub that accounts for less than 0.05% of total U.S. passenger enplanements, but more than 10,000 annual enplanements.
  - CS: Commercial service – nonprimary are publicly owned airports that receive scheduled passenger service and have at least 2,500 passenger boardings each year.
  - R: Reliever airports are designated by the FAA to relieve congestion at a large commercial service airport and to provide more general aviation access to the overall community.
  - GA: General aviation airports are the largest single group of airports in the U.S. airport system. They are public-use airports that do not have scheduled service or have scheduled service with less than 2,500 passenger boardings each year.
- **Enplanements** – The number of enplanements (commercial passenger boardings) that occurred at the airport in calendar year 2024, as per FAA records released 2025.

| City served | FAA | IATA | ICAO | Airport name | Role | Enplanements (2024) |
|---|---|---|---|---|---|---|
| | | | | **Commercial service – primary airports** | | |
| Albany | ABY | ABY | KABY | **Southwest Georgia Regional Airport** | P-N | 30,295 |
| Atlanta | ATL | ATL | KATL | **Hartsfield–Jackson Atlanta International Airport** | P-L | 52,511,402 |
| Augusta | AGS | AGS | KAGS | **Augusta Regional Airport** (Bush Field) | P-N | 299,141 |
| Brunswick | BQK | BQK | KBQK | **Brunswick Golden Isles Airport** | P-N | 42,771 |
| Columbus | CSG | CSG | KCSG | **Columbus Airport** | P-N | 63,422 |
| Macon | MCN | MCN | KMCN | **Middle Georgia Regional Airport** | P-N | 17,020 |
| Savannah | SAV | SAV | KSAV | **Savannah/Hilton Head International Airport** | P-S | 2,020,753 |
| Valdosta | VLD | VLD | KVLD | **Valdosta Regional Airport** | P-N | 46,744 |
| | | | | **Reliever airports** | | |
| Atlanta | FTY | FTY | KFTY | Fulton County Executive Airport (Charlie Brown Field) | R | 243 |
| Atlanta / Chamblee | PDK | PDK | KPDK | DeKalb–Peachtree Airport | R | 3,697 |
| Atlanta / Kennesaw | RYY | | KRYY | Cobb County International Airport (McCollum Field) | R | 66 |
| Atlanta / Lawrenceville | LZU | LZU | KLZU | Gwinnett County Airport (Briscoe Field) | R | 86 |
| | | | | **General aviation airports** | | |
| Adel | 15J | | | Cook County Airport | GA | 0 |
| Alma | AMG | | KAMG | Bacon County Airport | GA | 0 |
| Americus | ACJ | | KACJ | Jimmy Carter Regional Airport (Souther Field) | GA | 5 |
| Ashburn | 75J | | | Turner County Airport | GA | 0 |
| Athens | AHN | AHN | KAHN | Athens Ben Epps Airport | GA | 2,069 |
| Atlanta / Covington | CVC | | | Covington Municipal Airport | GA | 2 |
| Atlanta / Dallas | PUJ | | KPUJ | Paulding Northwest Atlanta Airport (was Paulding County Regional) | GA | 9 |
| Atlanta / Hampton | HMP | | KHMP | Atlanta Speedway Airport (was Clayton County Airport) | GA | 5 |
| Atlanta / Newnan | CCO | | KCCO | Newnan–Coweta County Airport | GA | 99 |
| Atlanta / Peachtree City | FFC | | KFFC | Atlanta Regional Airport (Falcon Field) (was Peachtree City Airport) | GA | 35 |
| Augusta | DNL | DNL | KDNL | Daniel Field | GA | 126 |
| Bainbridge | BGE | BGE | KBGE | Decatur County Industrial Air Park | GA | 27 |
| Baxley | BHC | | KBHC | Baxley Municipal Airport | GA | 0 |
| Blairsville | DZJ | | KDZJ | Blairsville Airport | GA | 1 |
| Blakely | BIJ | | KBIJ | Early County Airport | GA | 0 |
| Butler | 6A1 | | | Butler Municipal Airport | GA | 0 |
| Cairo | 70J | | | Cairo-Grady County Airport | GA | 0 |
| Calhoun | CZL | | KCZL | Tom B. David Field | GA | 2 |
| Camilla | CXU | | KCXU | Camilla-Mitchell County Airport | GA | 23 |
| Canon | 18A | | | Franklin-Hart Airport (was Franklin County Airport) | GA | 7 |
| Canton | CNI | | KCNI | Cherokee County Regional Airport | GA | 10 |
| Carrollton | CTJ | | KCTJ | West Georgia Regional Airport (O.V. Gray Field) | GA | 10 |
| Cartersville | VPC | | KVPC | Cartersville Airport | GA | 12 |
| Cedartown | 4A4 | | | Polk County Airport (Cornelius Moore Field) | GA | 0 |
| Claxton | CWV | | KCWV | Claxton-Evans County Airport | GA | 0 |
| Cochran | 48A | | | Cochran Airport | GA | 2 |
| Cordele | CKF | CKF | KCKF | Crisp County–Cordele Airport | GA | 7 |
| Cornelia | AJR | | KAJR | Habersham County Airport | GA | 6 |
| Cuthbert | 25J | | | Lower Chattahoochee Regional Airport (was Cuthbert-Randolph Airport) | GA | 0 |
| Dalton | DNN | DNN | KDNN | Dalton Municipal Airport | GA | 7 |
| Dawson | 16J | | | Dawson Municipal Airport | GA | 0 |
| Donalsonville | 17J | | | Donalsonville Municipal Airport | GA | 3 |
| Douglas | DQH | | KDQH | Douglas Municipal Airport | GA | 14 |
| Dublin | DBN | DBN | KDBN | W. H. 'Bud' Barron Airport | GA | 21 |
| Eastman | EZM | | KEZM | Heart of Georgia Regional Airport | GA | 0 |
| Elberton | EBA | | KEBA | Elbert County Airport (Patz Field) | GA | 0 |
| Ellijay | 49A | | | Gilmer County Airport | GA | 0 |
| Fitzgerald | FZG | | KFZG | Fitzgerald Municipal Airport | GA | 0 |
| Fort Stewart / Hinesville | LHW | **LIY** | KLHW | MidCoast Regional Airport at Wright Army Airfield | GA | 0 |
| Gainesville | GVL | GVL | KGVL | Lee Gilmer Memorial Airport | GA | 113 |
| Greensboro | CPP | | KCPP | Greene County Regional Airport (was 3J7) | GA | 35 |
| Griffin | 6A2 | | | Griffin–Spalding County Airport | GA | 0 |
| Hazlehurst | AZE | | KAZE | Hazlehurst Airport | GA | 0 |
| Homerville | HOE | | KHOE | Homerville Airport | GA | 0 |
| Jasper | JZP | | KJZP | Pickens County Airport | GA | 5 |
| Jefferson | JCA | | KJCA | Jackson County Airport | GA | 5 |
| Jekyll Island | 09J | | | Jekyll Island Airport | GA | 5 |
| Jesup | JES | | KJES | Jesup–Wayne County Airport | GA | 0 |
| LaFayette | 9A5 | | | Barwick LaFayette Airport | GA | 0 |
| LaGrange | LGC | LGC | KLGC | LaGrange Callaway Airport | GA | 7 |
| Louisville | 2J3 | | | Louisville Municipal Airport | GA | 0 |
| Macon | MAC | MAC | KMAC | Macon Downtown Airport (was Herbert Smart Airport) | GA | 6 |
| Madison | 52A | | | Madison Municipal Airport | GA | 0 |
| McRae | MQW | MQW | KMQW | Telfair–Wheeler Airport | GA | 0 |
| Metter | MHP | | KMHP | Metter Municipal Airport | GA | 10 |
| Milledgeville | MLJ | MLJ | KMLJ | Baldwin County Regional Airport | GA | 0 |
| Millen | 2J5 | | | Millen Airport | GA | 0 |
| Monroe | D73 | | | Cy Nunnally Memorial Airport | GA | 0 |
| Montezuma | 53A | | | Dr. C.P. Savage Sr. Airport | GA | 0 |
| Moultrie | MGR | MGR | KMGR | Moultrie Municipal Airport | GA | 7 |
| Nahunta | 4J1 | | | Brantley County Airport | GA | 0 |
| Nashville | 4J2 | | | Berrien County Airport | GA | 15 |
| Perry | PXE | | KPXE | Perry–Houston County Airport | GA | 9 |
| Pine Mountain | PIM | PIM | KPIM | Harris County Airport (was Callaway Gardens-Harris County Airport) | GA | 4 |
| Quitman | 4J5 | | | Quitman Brooks County Airport | GA | 0 |
| Reidsville | RVJ | | KRVJ | Reidsville Municipal Airport (Swinton Smith Field) | GA | 0 |
| Rome | RMG | RMG | KRMG | Richard B. Russell Regional Airport (J.H. Towers Field) | GA | 4 |
| St. Simons Island | SSI | SSI | KSSI | St. Simons Island Airport | GA | 732 |
| Sandersville | OKZ | | KOKZ | Kaolin Field | GA | 0 |
| Statesboro | TBR | TBR | KTBR | Statesboro–Bulloch County Airport | GA | 6 |
| Swainsboro | SBO | | KSBO | East Georgia Regional Airport | GA | 0 |
| Sylvania | JYL | | KJYL | Plantation Airpark | GA | 2 |
| Sylvester | SYV | SYV | KSYV | Sylvester Airport | GA | 13 |
| Thomaston | OPN | | KOPN | Thomaston-Upson County Airport | GA | 4 |
| Thomasville | TVI | TVI | KTVI | Thomasville Regional Airport | GA | 68 |
| Thomson | HQU | | KHQU | Thomson-McDuffie County Airport | GA | 0 |
| Tifton | TMA | TMA | KTMA | Henry Tift Myers Airport | GA | 1 |
| Toccoa | TOC | TOC | KTOC | Toccoa Airport (R.G. LeTourneau Field) | GA | 13 |
| Vidalia | VDI | VDI | KVDI | Vidalia Regional Airport | GA | 51 |
| Warm Springs | 5A9 | | | Roosevelt Memorial Airport | GA | 0 |
| Washington | IIY | | KIIY | Washington-Wilkes County Airport | GA | 0 |
| Waycross | AYS | AYS | KAYS | Waycross–Ware County Airport | GA | 4 |
| Waynesboro | BXG | | KBXG | Burke County Airport | GA | 0 |
| Winder | WDR | WDR | KWDR | Barrow County Airport (was Winder-Barrow, then Northeast Georgia Regional) | GA | 10 |
| Wrens | 65J | | | Wrens Memorial Airport | GA | 0 |
| | | | | **Other public-use airports** (not listed in NPIAS) | | |
| Buena Vista | 82A | | | Marion County Airport | | |
| Dahlonega | 9A0 | | | Lumpkin County-Wimpys Airport | | |
| Folkston | 3J6 | | | Davis Field | | |
| Hawkinsville | 51A | | | Hawkinsville-Pulaski County Airport | | |
| Moultrie | MUL | MUL | KMUL | Spence Airport | | |
| Soperton | 4J8 | | | Treutlen County Airport | | |
| Warner Robins | 5A2 | | | Warner Robins Air Park | | |
| Williamson | GA2 | | | Peach State Aerodrome | | |
| | | | | **Other government/military airports** | | |
| Fort Benning / Columbus | LSF | LSF | KLSF | Lawson Army Airfield | | 0 |
| Marietta | MGE | MGE | KMGE | Dobbins Air Reserve Base / NAS Atlanta | | 665 |
| Savannah | SVN | SVN | KSVN | Hunter Army Airfield / Fort Stewart | | 6,416 |
| Valdosta | VAD | VAD | KVAD | Moody Air Force Base | | 594 |
| Warner Robins | WRB | WRB | KWRB | Robins Air Force Base | | 295 |
| | | | | **Notable private-use airports** | | |
| Palmetto | 89GE | | | South Fulton Airport (public use in 2005, FAA: 8A9) | | |
| Plains | 4GA5 | | | Peterson Field | | |
| Stockbridge | 7GA7 | | | Berry Hill Airport | | |
| Woolsey | GA82 | | | Rust Airstrip | | |
| | | | | **Notable former airports** | | |
| Albany | | ~~NAB~~ | ~~KNAB~~ | Turner Air Force Base (closed 1979) | | |
| Brunswick | | ~~NEA~~ | | Naval Air Station Glynco (closed 1970s) | | |
| Chamblee | | | | Naval Air Station Atlanta (relocated to Marietta in 1959) | | |
| Columbus | | ~~MKF~~ | | McKenna Army Airfield | | |
| Forest Park | | ~~FOP~~ | | Morris Army Airfield (closed 1970s) | | |
| Hinesville | ~~2J2~~ | | | Liberty County Airport (closed 2010?) | | |
| St. Marys | ~~4J6~~ | | | St. Marys Airport (closed 2017) | | |

== See also ==
- Essential Air Service
- Georgia World War II Army Airfields
- Wikipedia:WikiProject Aviation/Airline destination lists: North America#Georgia
