= Monroe Regional Airport =

Monroe Regional Airport may refer to:

- Monroe Regional Airport (Louisiana) serving Monroe, Louisiana, United States (FAA/IATA: MLU)
- Charlotte-Monroe Executive Airport, formerly Monroe Regional Airport, serving Monroe, North Carolina, United States (FAA: EQY)
- Monroe City Regional Airport serving Monroe, Missouri, United States (FAA: K52)

== See also ==
- Monroe Airport (disambiguation)
- Monroe County Airport (disambiguation)
