= KAJR =

KAJR may refer to:

- KAJR-LD, a low-power television station (channel 21, virtual 36) licensed to serve Des Moines, Iowa, United States
- KJJZ, a radio station (95.9 FM) licensed to serve Indian Wells, California, United States, which held the call sign KAJR from 2007 to 2015
- Habersham County Airport (ICAO code KAJR)
