= MLJ =

1. M.L.J. Magazines, Inc., see Archie Comics
2. MLJ, IATA code for Baldwin County Airport
3. The Modern Language Journal
