= KCKF =

KCKF may refer to:

- KCKF (FM), a radio station (91.9 FM) licensed to serve Cuba, Missouri, United States
- Crisp County–Cordele Airport (ICAO code KCKF)
