= CZL =

CZL may refer to:

- CZL, the IATA code for Mohamed Boudiaf International Airport, Constantine, Algeria
- CZL, the ICAO code for Tom B. David Field, Gordon County, Georgia, United States
