= Gainesville Airport =

Gainesville Airport may refer to:

- Gainesville Regional Airport in Gainesville, Florida, United States (IATA/FAA: GNV)
- Lee Gilmer Memorial Airport in Gainesville, Georgia, United States (IATA/FAA: GVL)
