= CKF =

CKF may refer to:

- Cairo Knife Fight, a rock band originating from New Zealand
- CKF, the FAA LID code for Crisp County–Cordele Airport, Georgia, United States
