= KPIM =

KPIM may refer to:

- KPIM-LP, a low-power radio station (102.9 FM) licensed to serve Broken Arrow, Oklahoma, United States
- Harris County Airport (ICAO code KPIM)
