= KSBO =

KSBO may refer to:

- KSBO-CD, a low-power television station (channel 36, virtual 42) licensed to serve San Luis Obispo, California, United States
- East Georgia Regional Airport
