= Monroe Airport =

Monroe Airport may refer to:

- Monroe City Regional Airport serving Monroe, Missouri, United States (FAA: K52)
- Monroe Municipal Airport serving Monroe, Wisconsin, United States (FAA: EFT)
- Monroe Regional Airport (Louisiana) serving Monroe, Louisiana, United States (FAA/IATA: MLU)
- Charlotte-Monroe Executive Airport, formerly Monroe Regional Airport, serving Monroe, North Carolina, United States (FAA: EQY)
- Monroe-Walton County Airport serving Monroe, Georgia, United States (FAA: D73)

== See also ==
- Monroe County Airport (disambiguation)
