= Davis Field =

Davis Field may refer to:

- Davis Field (Georgia), an airport in Folkston, Georgia, United States (FAA: 3J6)
- Davis Field (Oklahoma), an airport in Muskogee, Oklahoma, United States (FAA: MKO)
- Bayport Aerodrome, formerly known as Davis Field, in Bayport, New York, United States (FAA: 23N)
- Washington Manassas Airport, also known as Harry P. Davis Field, Manassas, Virginia, United States (FAA: HEF)
- United States Air Force Academy Airfield, also known as United States Air Force Academy Airfield, USAFA, Colorado, United States (FAA: AFF)

== See also ==
- Davis Airport (disambiguation)
