= Rust Airstrip =

- IATA: none; ICAO: none; FAA LID: 3RU

Summary
- Airport type: Public use
- Owner: Robert E. Rust
- Serves: Woolsey, Georgia
- Elevation AMSL: 810 ft / 247 m
- Coordinates: 33°19′58″N 084°24′03″W
- Interactive map of Rust Airstrip

Runways
Direction	Length		Surface
Direction	ft	m	Surface
E/W	2,750	838	Turf

Statistics (2000)
- Aircraft operations: 500
- Based aircraft: 3
- Source: Federal Aviation Administration

Rust Airstrip (FAA LID: 3RU) is a privately owned, public use airport located two nautical miles (4 km) south of the central business district of Woolsey, in Fayette County, Georgia, United States.

== Facilities and aircraft ==
Rust Airstrip covers an area of 10 acres (4 ha) at an elevation of 810 feet (247 m) above mean sea level. It has one runway designated E/W with a turf surface measuring 2,750 by 120 feet (838 x 37 m).

For the 12 months ending January 12, 2000, the airport had 500 general aviation aircraft operations, averaging 41 per month. At that time, there were three aircraft based at this airport, all single-engine.

== See also ==
- List of airports in Georgia (U.S. state)
