= Cook County Airport =

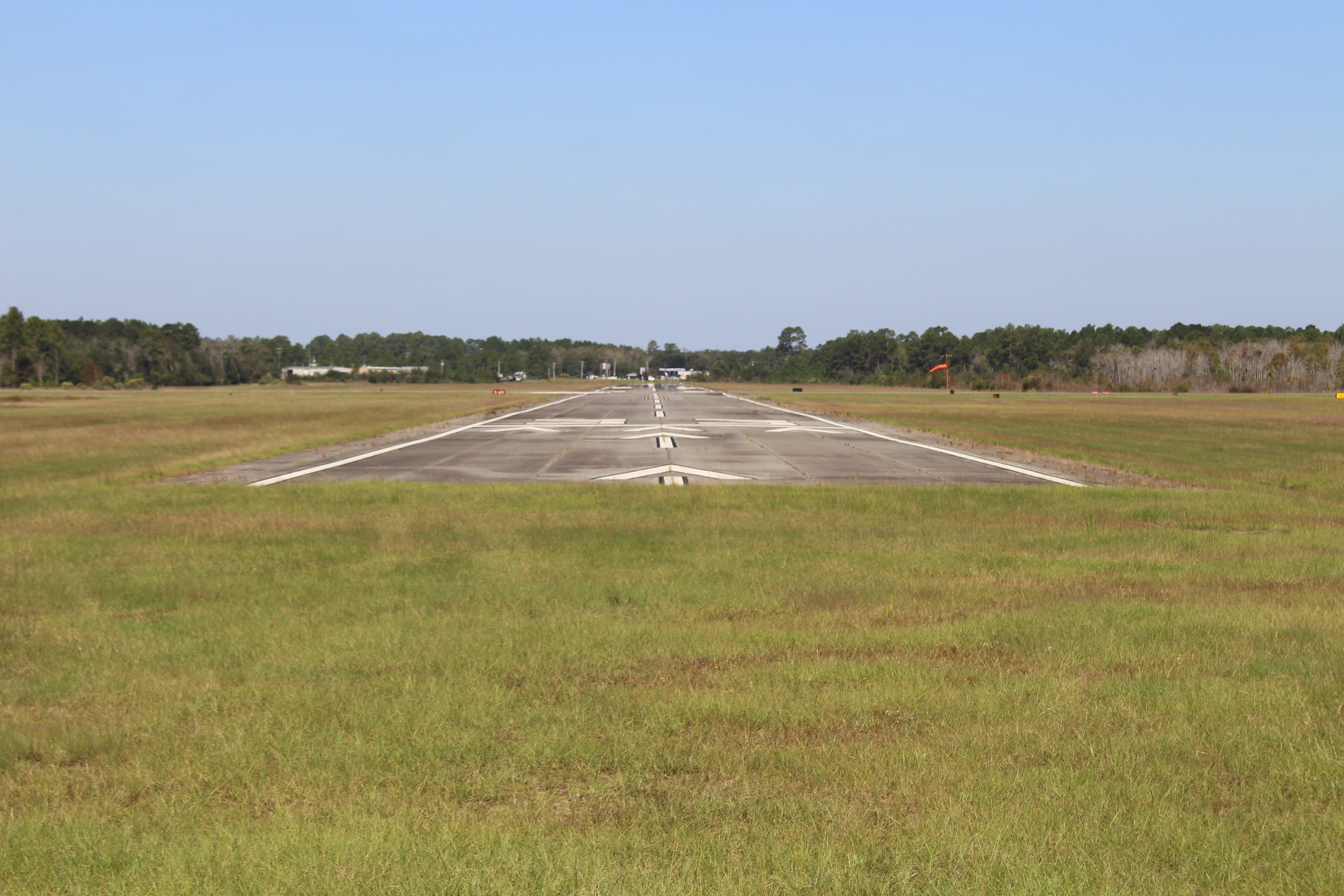
- IATA: none; ICAO: none; FAA LID: 15J

Summary
- Airport type: Public
- Owner: Cook County
- Location: Adel, Georgia
- Elevation AMSL: 235 ft (72 m)
- Coordinates: 31°08′14″N 083°27′14″W
- Interactive map of Cook County Airport

Runways
Direction	Length		Surface
Direction	ft	m	Surface
5/23	5,001	1,524	Asphalt
15/33	3,999	1,219	Asphalt

Statistics (2022)
- Aircraft operations (year ending 12/1/2022): 13,800
- Based aircraft: 27
- Source: Federal Aviation Administration

Cook County Airport (FAA LID: 15J) is a county-owned, public-use airport in Cook County, Georgia, United States. It is located one nautical mile (2 km) west of the central business district of Adel, Georgia. This airport is included in the National Plan of Integrated Airport Systems for 2011–2015, which categorized it as a general aviation airport.

== Facilities and aircraft ==
Cook County Airport covers an area of 368 acres (149 ha) at an elevation of 235 feet (72 m) above mean sea level. It has two asphalt paved runways: 5/23 is 5,501 by 100 feet (1,677 x 30 m) and 15/33 is 3,999 by 100 feet (1,219 x 30 m).

For the 12-month period ending December 1, 2022, the airport had 13,800 aircraft operations, an average of 38 per day: 74% general aviation, and 26% military. At that time there were 27 aircraft based at this airport: 26 single-engine and 1 jet.

== See also ==
- List of airports in Georgia (U.S. state)
