= Dalton Municipal Airport =

Coordinates: 34°43′23″N 084°52′13″W

- IATA: DNN; ICAO: KDNN; FAA LID: DNN

Summary
- Airport type: Public
- Owner: City of Dalton
- Serves: Dalton, Georgia
- Elevation AMSL: 709 ft (216 m)
- Website: https://www.daltonga.gov/airport
- Interactive map of Dalton Municipal Airport

Runways
Direction	Length		Surface
Direction	ft	m	Surface
14/32	5,496	1,675	Asphalt

Statistics (2022)
- Aircraft operations: 23,100
- Source: Federal Aviation Administration

Dalton Municipal Airport (IATA: DNN, ICAO: KDNN, FAA LID: DNN) is a city-owned public-use airport located six miles (10 km) southeast of the central business district of Dalton, a city in Whitfield County, Georgia, United States.

== Facilities and aircraft ==
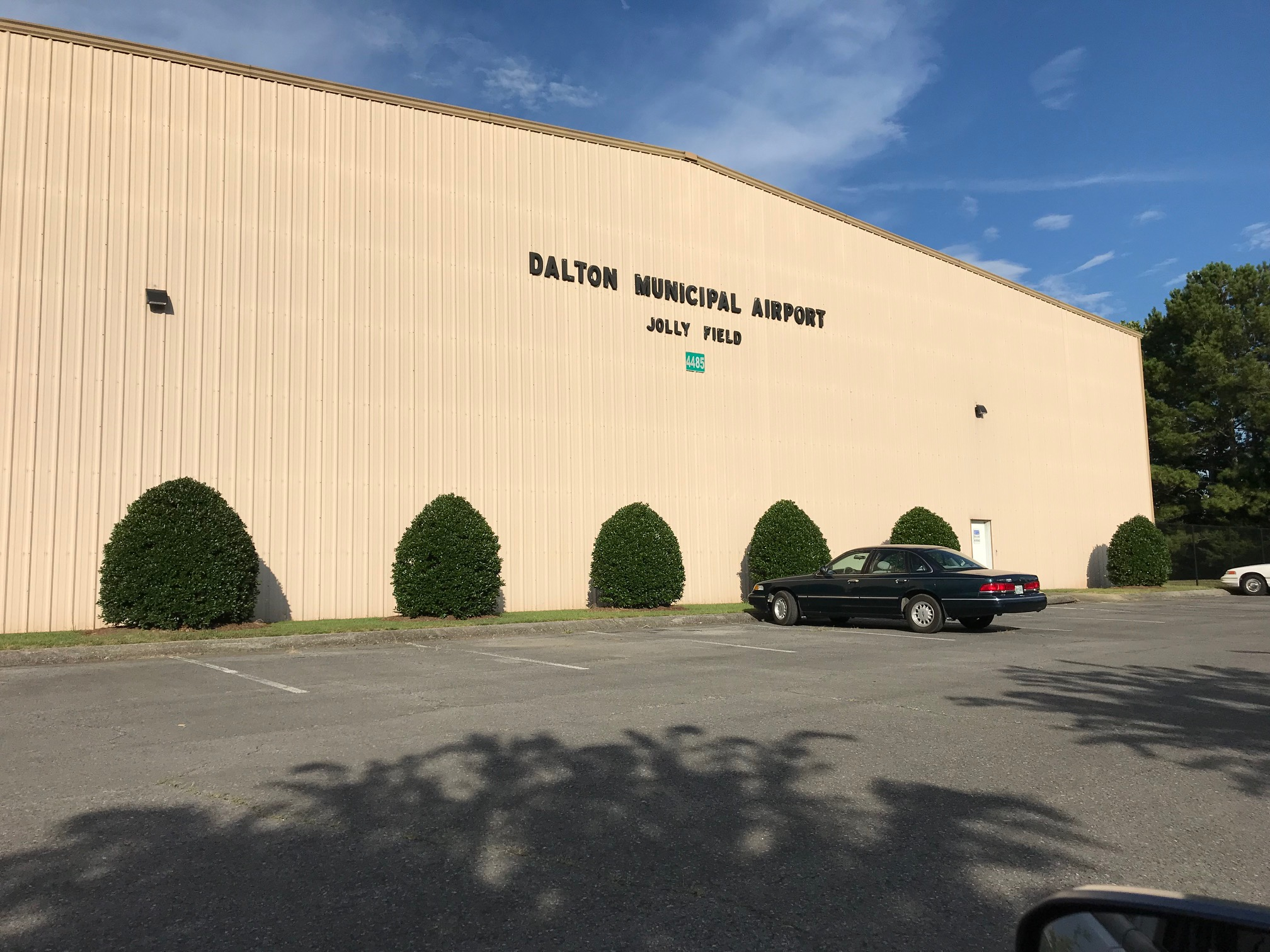
Dalton Municipal Airport Hangar building

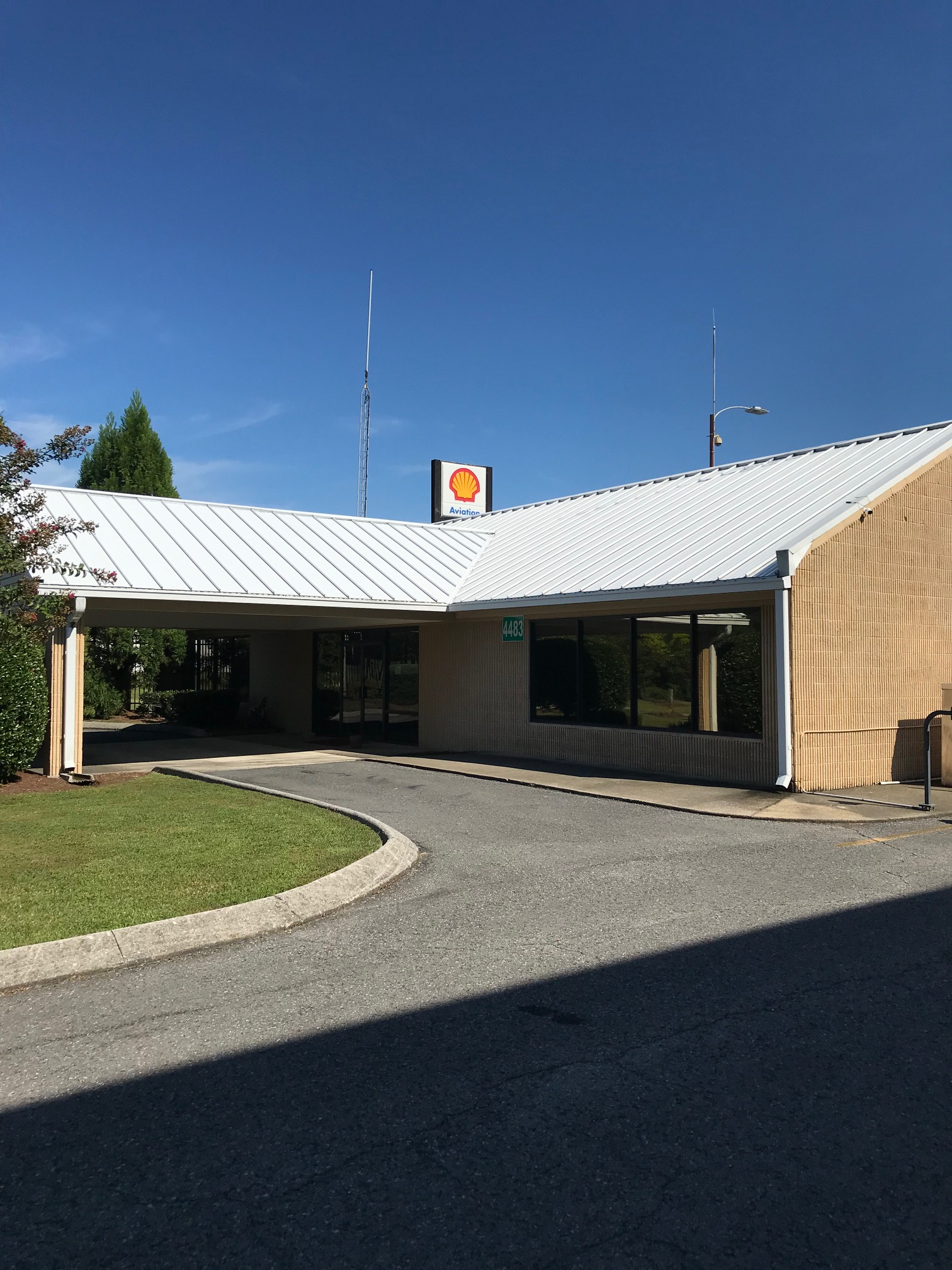
Dalton Municipal Airport lobby entrance

Dalton Municipal Airport covers an area of 554 acres (224 ha) and contains one asphalt paved runway designated 14/32 which measures 5,496 by 100 ft (1,675 by 30 m).

For the 12-month period ending December 31, 2022, the airport had 23,100 aircraft operations, an average of 63 per day: 100% general aviation and <1% military.

== Accidents near DNN ==
- On August 14, 1997, a Colvin Aviation Beechcraft Super King Air impacted terrain 0.2 miles NW of DNN while making a localizer approach to Runway 14. The sole occupant, the pilot, was killed. Factors in the crash were improper IFR procedure, darkness, low ceiling, fog, and pilot fatigue.

== History ==
As apart of his midterm barnstorm strategy President Donald Trump would hold a rally at Dalton Airport in October 2026 to support candidates Rick Jackson who is running for Governor of Georgia and Mike Collins who is running for senate and other Georgia Republicans.

== See also ==
- List of airports in Georgia (U.S. state)
