= Homerville Airport =

Airport in Georgia, United States

- IATA: none; ICAO: KHOE; FAA LID: HOE

Summary
- Airport type: Public
- Owner: City of Homerville
- Serves: Homerville, Georgia
- Elevation AMSL: 186 ft (57 m)
- Coordinates: 31°03′21″N 082°46′27″W
- Interactive map of Homerville Airport

Runways
Direction	Length		Surface
Direction	ft	m	Surface
14/32	4,000	1,219	Asphalt

Statistics (2008)
- Aircraft operations: 1,300
- Source: Federal Aviation Administration

Homerville Airport (ICAO: KHOE, FAA LID: HOE) is a city-owned public-use airport located two nautical miles (3.7 km) northwest of the central business district of Homerville, a city in Clinch County, Georgia, United States.

Although many U.S. airports use the same three-letter location identifier for the FAA and IATA, this facility is assigned HOE by the FAA but has no designation from the IATA.

== History ==
The airport was built by the United States Army Air Forces about 1942, and was known as Homerville Flight Strip. It was an emergency landing airfield for military aircraft on training flights. It was closed after World War II, and was turned over for local government use by the War Assets Administration (WAA).

== Facilities and aircraft ==
Homerville Airport covers an area of 239 acres (97 ha) at an elevation of 186 feet (57 m) above mean sea level. It has one runway designated 14/32 with an asphalt surface measuring 4,000 by 75 feet (1,219 x 23 m). For the 12-month period ending August 26, 2008, the airport had 1,300 general aviation aircraft operations, an average of 108 per month.

== See also ==
- List of airports in Georgia (U.S. state)
