= Cochran Airport =

Airport in Cochran, Georgia, United States

- IATA: none; ICAO: none; FAA LID: 48A

Summary
- Airport type: Public
- Operator: Cochran Municipal Airport Authority
- Serves: Cochran, Georgia
- Coordinates: 32°24′2″N 83°16′42″W
- Interactive map of Cochran Airport

Runways
Direction	Length		Surface
Direction	ft	m	Surface
5/23	3,202	976	Asphalt
11/29	4,400	1,341	Asphalt

Statistics (2011)
- Based aircraft: 16
- Sources: FAA

Cochran Airport (FAA LID: 48A) (also known as Red Curtis Field) is a city-owned, public-use airport located four nautical miles (6.4 km) east of the central business district of Cochran, a city in Bleckley County, Georgia, United States. It is included in the National Plan of Integrated Airport Systems for 2011–2015, which categorized it as a general aviation facility.

== History ==
In March 2008, the airport was given the name Red Curtis Field in honor of flight instructor and aerial applicator H.d. "Red" Curtis. On October 29, 2024, Middle Georgia State University opened a $70,000 campus at the airport.

== Facilities ==
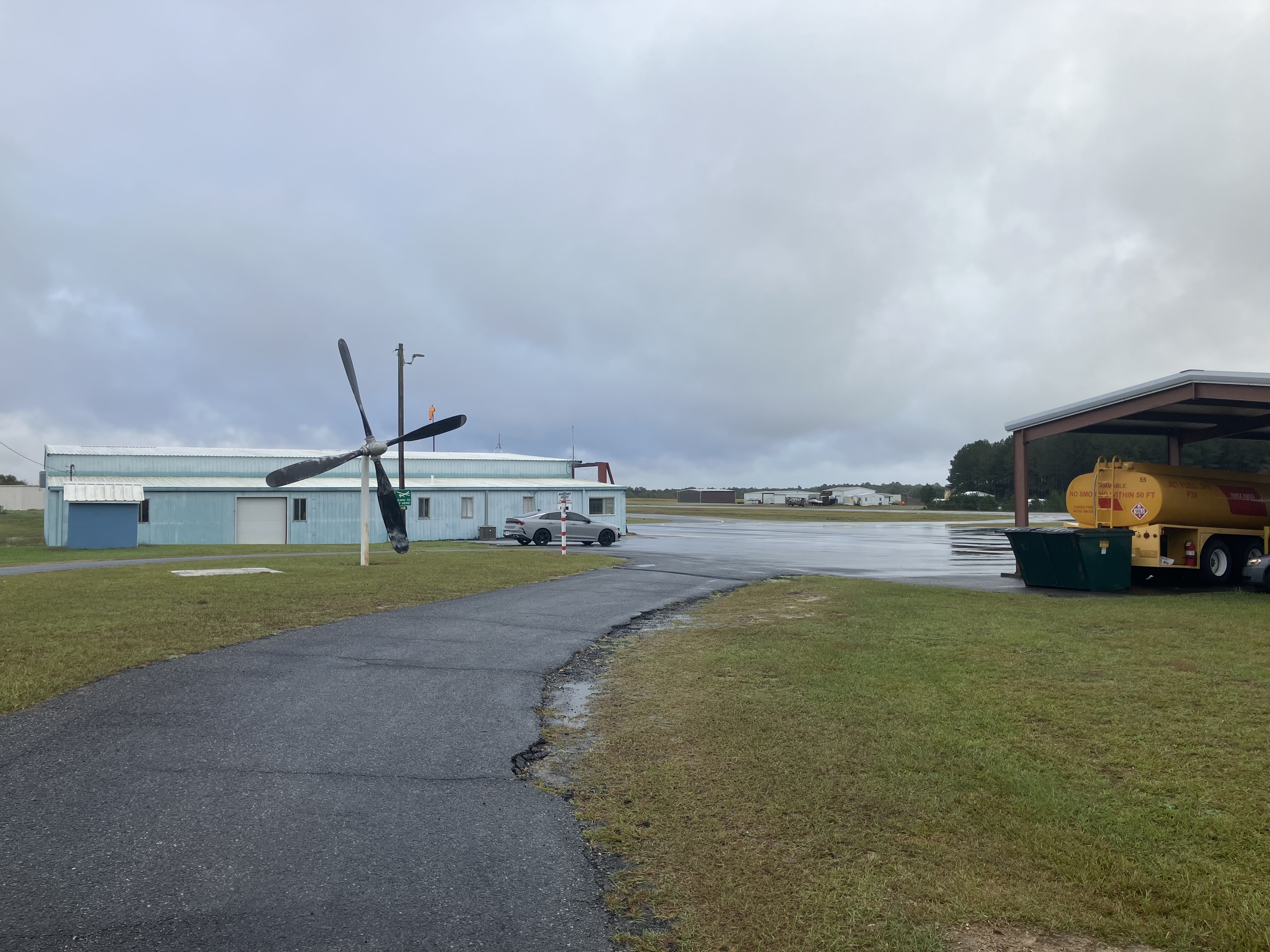
The office building of Cochran Airport

Cochran Airport covers an area of 125 acres (51 ha) at an elevation of 377 feet (115 m) above mean sea level. It has two runways with asphalt surface. The longer of the two, Runway 11/29 measures 4,400 by 75 feet (1,341 x 23 m). Runway 5/23 measures 3,202 by 50 feet (976 x 15 m). In addition to general aviation facilities, the airport also serves as a satellite campus to Middle Georgia State University's aviation program that operates primarily out of Heart of Georgia Regional Airport in Eastman.

== Statistics ==
For the 12-month period ending on July 3, 2011, there were 16 aircraft based at this airport.

== See also ==
- List of airports in Georgia (U.S. state)
