= Pickens County Airport (Georgia) =

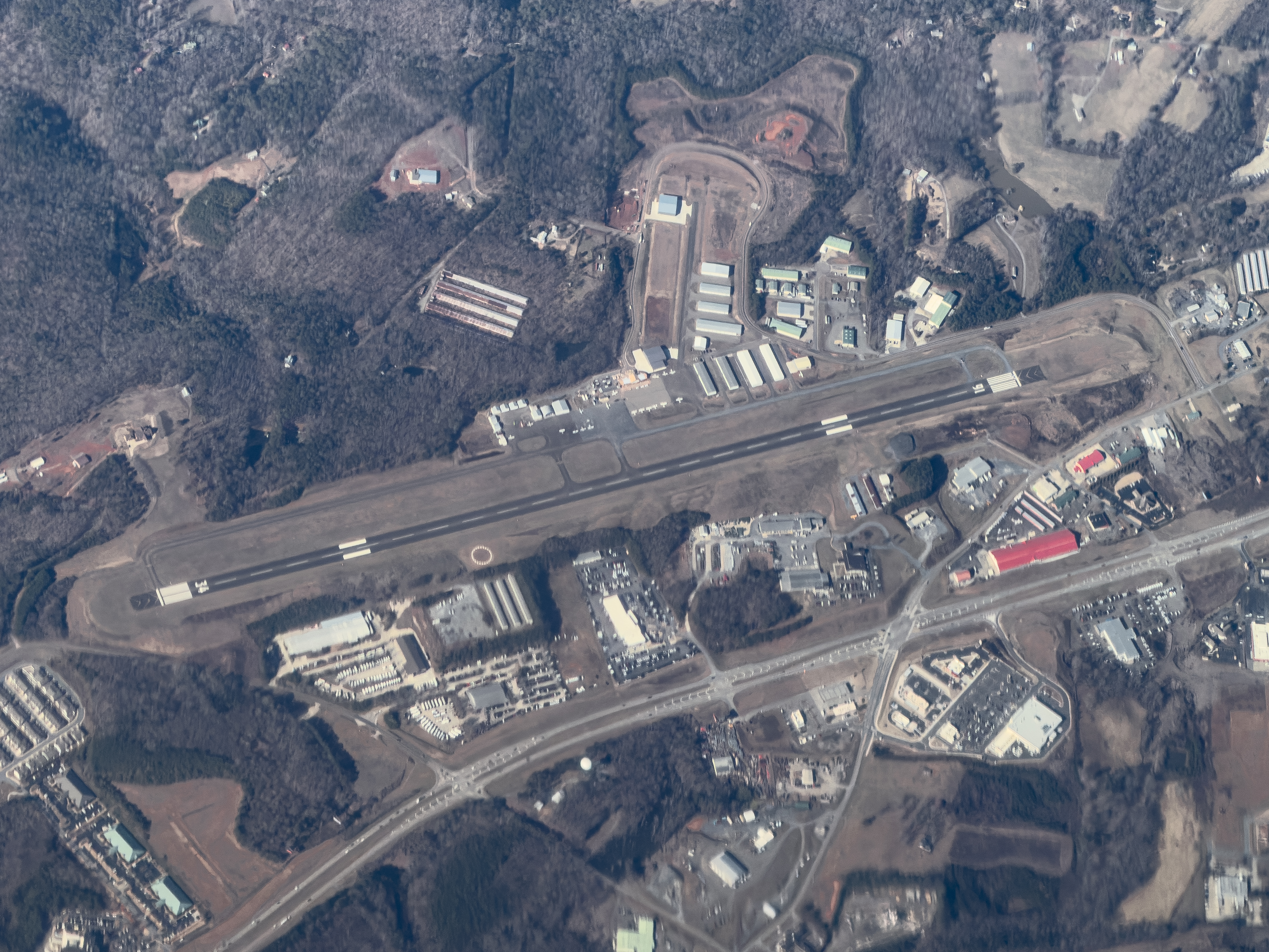
- IATA: none; ICAO: KJZP; FAA LID: JZP

Summary
- Airport type: Public
- Owner: Pickens County
- Serves: Jasper, Georgia
- Elevation AMSL: 1,535 ft / 468 m
- Coordinates: 34°27′12″N 084°27′26″W
- Interactive map of Pickens County Airport

Runways
Direction	Length		Surface
Direction	ft	m	Surface
16/34	5,000	1,524	Asphalt

Statistics (2009)
- Aircraft operations: 15,000
- Based aircraft: 81 (12/9/20)
- Source: Federal Aviation Administration

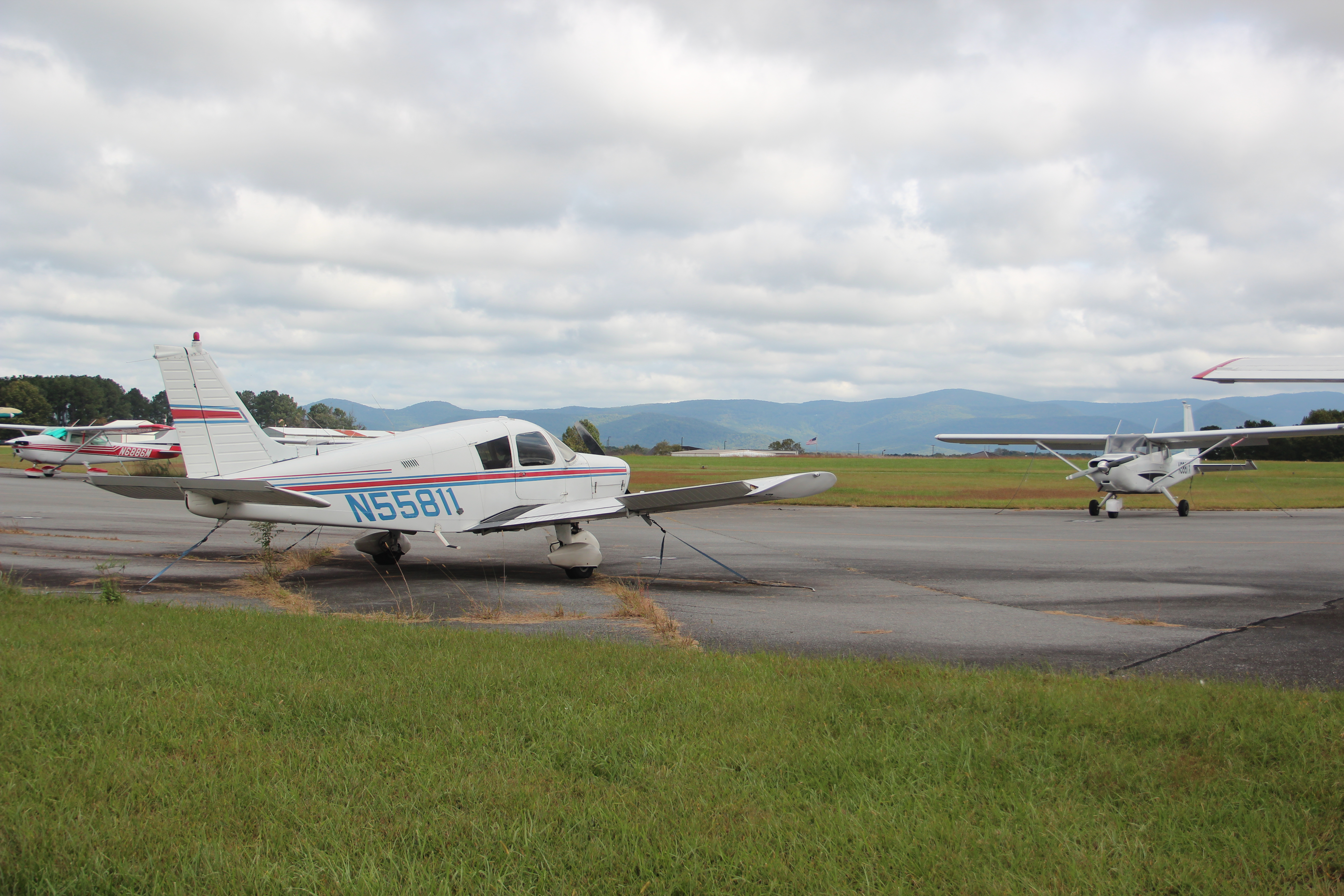
Ground image of Pickens County Airport

Pickens County Airport (ICAO: KJZP, FAA LID: JZP) is a county-owned, public-use airport in Pickens County, Georgia, United States. It is located two nautical miles (3.7 km) southwest of the central business district of Jasper, Georgia. As per the FAA's National Plan of Integrated Airport Systems for 2009-2013, it is classified as a general aviation airport.

Although most U.S. airports use the same three-letter location identifier for the FAA and IATA, this airport is assigned JZP by the FAA but has no designation from the IATA.

== Facilities and aircraft ==
Pickens County Airport covers an area of 137 acres (55 ha) at an elevation of 1,535 feet (468 m) above mean sea level. It has one runway designated 16/34 with an asphalt surface measuring 5,000 by 100 feet (1,524 x 30 m).

For the 12-month period ending December 31, 2018, the airport had 30,660 general aviation aircraft operations, an average of 84/per day. At that time there were 83 aircraft based at this airport: 78 single-engine, 3 multi-engine, and 2 helicopter and 13%.

== See also ==
- List of airports in Georgia (U.S. state)
