= Covington Municipal Airport (Georgia) =

Airport in Georgia, United States

- IATA: none; ICAO: none; FAA LID: CVC

Summary
- Airport type: Public
- Owner: City of Covington
- Serves: Covington, Georgia
- Elevation AMSL: 809 ft (247 m)
- Coordinates: 33°37′56″N 083°50′51″W
- Website: http://www.covingtonmunicipalairport.org/
- Interactive map of Covington Municipal Airport

Runways
Direction	Length		Surface
Direction	ft	m	Surface
10/28	6,000	1,828	Asphalt

Statistics (2020)
- Aircraft operations: 15,000
- Based aircraft: 28
- Source: Federal Aviation Administration

Covington Municipal Airport (IATA: KCVC, FAA LID: CVC) is a city-owned public-use airport located three nautical miles (6 km) north of the central business district of Covington, a city in Newton County, Georgia, United States.

== Facilities and aircraft ==
Covington Municipal Airport covers an area of 700 acres (280 ha) at an elevation of 809 feet (247 m) above mean sea level. It has one runway designated 10/28 with an asphalt surface measuring 5,500 by 75 feet (1,676 x 23 m).

A city-owned FBO is located on the airport offering fuel, parking, and hangar services as well as a passenger terminal, courtesy cars, a lounge, and aircraft maintenance. An independent Part 145 repair station is also available, offering major maintenance, avionics installation, and standard inspections. Aircraft rental is available through the FBO and a local flying club.

For the 12-month period ending December 31, 2020, the airport had 41 operations per day, or about 15,000 per year. All of it was general aviation. At that time, there were 28 aircraft based at this airport: 21 single-engine and 6 multi-engine airplanes and 1 helicopter.

== Accidents and incidents ==
- On April 21, 2022, a Cessna 340 crashed on a training flight in Covington. The two pilots on board were fatally injured. Witnesses reported the plane made a "hard right" turn and started to spiral downwards before impacting a row of parked semitruck trailers. The accident is under investigation.
- On February 15, 2025, air traffic control lost communication with a Rockwell Commander, shortly after it departed from Covington Municipal Airport. The plane was found to have crashed in the woods just north of the runway, killing both occupants.

== See also ==
- List of airports in Georgia (U.S. state)
