= Peterson Field (Georgia) =

- IATA: none; ICAO: none; FAA LID: 4GA5

Summary
- Airport type: Public
- Owner: G. Thomas Peterson
- Serves: Plains, Georgia
- Elevation AMSL: 526 ft / 160 m
- Coordinates: 32°05′19″N 084°22′21″W
- Interactive map of Peterson Field

Runways
Direction	Length		Surface
Direction	ft	m	Surface
18/36	3,255	992	Turf

Statistics (2000)
- Aircraft operations: 2,190
- Source: Federal Aviation Administration

Peterson Field (FAA LID: 4GA5, formerly 7A9) is a public-use airport located three nautical miles (6 km) northeast of the central business district of Plains, a city in Sumter County, Georgia, United States. It is privately owned by G. Thomas Peterson.

== Facilities and aircraft ==
Peterson Field covers an area of 101 acres (41 ha) at an elevation of 526 feet (160 m) above mean sea level. It has one runway designated 18/36 with a 3,255 by 230 ft (992 x 70 m) turf surface. For the 12-month period ending April 26, 2000, the airport had 2,190 aircraft operations, an average of 183 per month, all of which were general aviation.

== See also ==
- List of airports in Georgia (U.S. state)
