= Lower Chattahoochee Regional Airport =

- IATA: none; ICAO: none; FAA LID: 25J

Summary
- Airport type: Public
- Owner: Randolph County
- Serves: Cuthbert, Georgia
- Elevation AMSL: 457 ft / 139 m
- Coordinates: 31°42′07″N 084°49′37″W
- Interactive map of Lower Chattahoochee Regional Airport

Runways
Direction	Length		Surface
Direction	ft	m	Surface
18/36	3,000	914	Asphalt

Statistics (2021)
- Aircraft operations: 2,000
- Sources: FAA, Georgia DOT

Lower Chattahoochee Regional Airport (FAA LID: 25J) is a county-owned, public-use airport located four nautical miles (5 mi, 7 km) southwest of the central business district of Cuthbert, a city in Randolph County, Georgia, United States. It was formerly known as Cuthbert-Randolph Airport. This airport is included in the National Plan of Integrated Airport Systems for 2011–2015, which categorized it as a general aviation facility.

== Facilities and aircraft ==
Lower Chattahoochee Regional Airport covers an area of 46 acres (19 ha) at an elevation of 457 feet (139 m) above mean sea level. It has one runway designated 18/36 with an asphalt surface measuring 3,000 by 60 feet (914 x 18 m).

For the 12-month period ending December 31, 2021, the airport had 2,000 general aviation aircraft operations, an average of 38 per week.

== See also ==
- List of airports in Georgia (U.S. state)
