= Franklin County Airport (Georgia) =

- IATA: none; ICAO: 18A; FAA LID: 18A

Summary
- Airport type: Public
- Owner: Franklin County
- Location: Canon, Georgia
- Elevation AMSL: 860 ft (260 m)
- Coordinates: 34°20′23″N 083°07′59″W
- Interactive map of Franklin County Airport

Runways
Direction	Length		Surface
Direction	ft	m	Surface
8/26	5,000	1,524	Asphalt

Statistics (2006)
- Aircraft operations: 6,000
- Source: Federal Aviation Administration

Franklin County Airport (FAA LID: 18A) is a public airport located one mile (2 km) southwest of the central business district of Canon, a city in Franklin County, Georgia, United States. It is owned by Franklin County.

== Facilities and aircraft ==
Franklin County Airport covers an area of 114 acres (46 ha) which contains one Asphalt paved runway (8/26) measuring 5,000 x 75 ft (1,524 x 23 m). For the 12-month period ending August 9, 2006, the airport had 6,000 aircraft operations, 100% of which were general aviation.

== See also ==
- List of airports in Georgia (U.S. state)
