= Newnan–Coweta County Airport =

Public use airport in Newnan, Georgia, United States

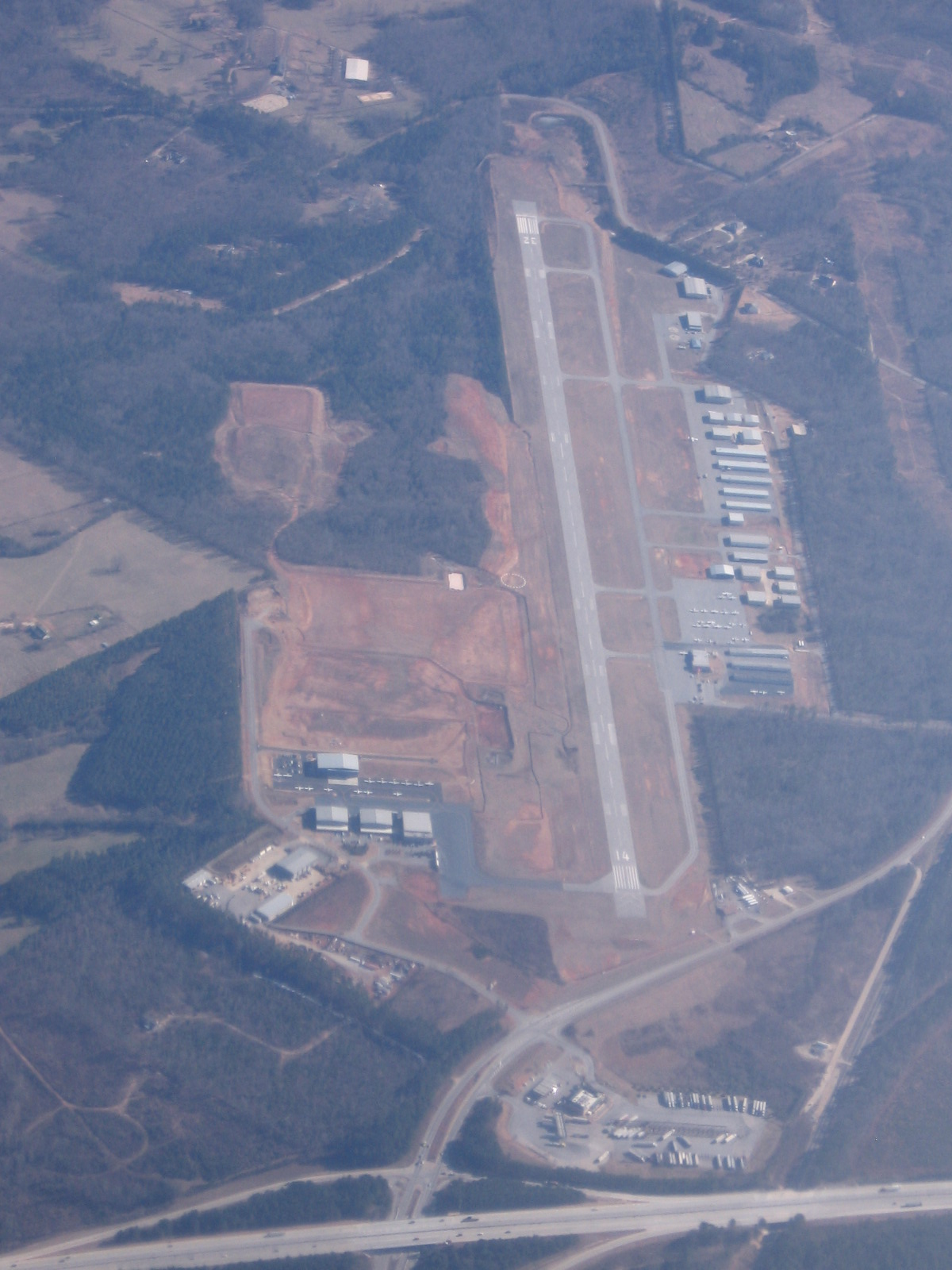
- Aerial view, January 2010
- IATA: none; ICAO: KCCO; FAA LID: CCO

Summary
- Airport type: Public
- Owner: Newnan & Coweta County Airport Authority
- Serves: Atlanta, Georgia
- Location: Newnan, Georgia
- Elevation AMSL: 970 ft / 296 m
- Coordinates: 33°18′42″N 084°46′11″W
- Website: Official website
- Interactive map of Newnan–Coweta County Airport

Runways
Direction	Length		Surface
Direction	ft	m	Surface
15/33	5,500	1,676	Asphalt

Statistics (2018)
- Aircraft operations: 80,000
- Based aircraft: 169
- Source: Federal Aviation Administration

Newnan–Coweta County Airport (ICAO: KCCO, FAA LID: CCO) is a public use airport in Coweta County, Georgia, United States. It is owned by the Newnan & Coweta County Airport Authority. The airport is located 4 nautical miles (7 km; 5 mi) south of the central business district of Newnan, Georgia and 33 nautical miles (61 km; 38 mi) southwest of Atlanta. It is surrounded by US 29 and I-85 and 100 acres (0.40 km^{2}) owned by the county.

The airport name appears in various formats, depending on the source. The FAA refers to it as both Newnan Coweta County Airport and Newnan–Coweta County Airport. The Georgia DOT airport directory adds a hyphen/dash for Newnan–Coweta County Airport. The City of Newnan's website drops "County" from the name, resulting in Newnan–Coweta Airport. Coweta County's website drops both "County" and the hyphen/dash, for Newnan Coweta Airport and also has a photo of a sign at the airport bearing that name.

It is included in the National Plan of Integrated Airport Systems for 2011–2015, which categorized it as a general aviation facility.

== Facilities and aircraft ==
Newnan–Coweta County Airport covers an area of 270 acres (109 ha) at an elevation of 970 feet (296 m) above mean sea level. It has one runway designated 15/33 with an asphalt surface measuring 5,500 by 100 feet (1,676 x 30 m).

For the 12-month period ending December 31, 2012, the airport had 50,000 general aviation aircraft operations, an average of 136 per day. At that time there were 100 aircraft based at this airport: 85% single-engine, 13% multi-engine, 2% jet, and 6% helicopter.

== See also ==
- List of airports in Georgia (U.S. state)
