= Jimmy Carter Regional Airport =

Jimmy Carter Regional Airport Souther Field
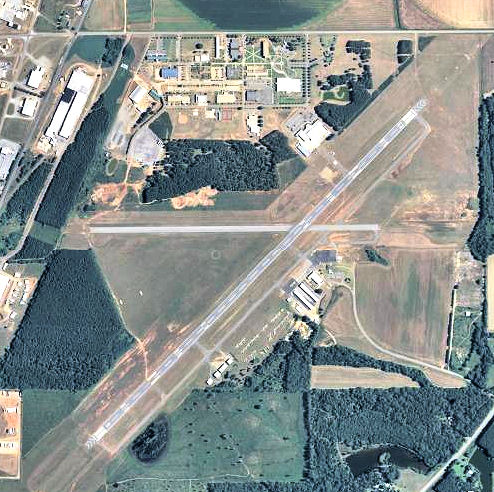
- 2006 USGS airphoto
- IATA: none; ICAO: KACJ; FAA LID: ACJ

Summary
- Airport type: Public
- Owner: Sumter County and Airport Authority
- Location: Sumter County, near Americus, Georgia
- Elevation AMSL: 471 ft (144 m)
- Coordinates: 32°06′38.8770″N 084°11′19.85″W

Map
- Location of Jimmy Carter Regional Airport

Runways
Direction	Length		Surface
Direction	ft	m	Surface
5/23	6,011	1,835	Asphalt
9/27	3,786	1,154	Asphalt

Statistics (2021)
- Aircraft operations: 8,500
- Based aircraft: 28
- Source: Federal Aviation Administration

see: Souther Field for the military history of the airport

Jimmy Carter Regional Airport (ICAO: KACJ, FAA LID: ACJ), previously Souther Field is a public airport located four miles (6 km) northeast of the central business district of Americus, in Sumter County, Georgia, United States. It is owned by the Sumter County and Airport Authority.

Although most U.S. airports use the same three-letter location identifier for the FAA and IATA, Souther Field is assigned ACJ by the FAA but has no designation from the IATA.

== Facilities and aircraft ==
Brown C. Hodges Terminal at Jimmy Carter Regional Airport

Jimmy Carter Regional Airport covers an area of 378 acres (153 ha) which contains two asphalt paved runways: 5/23 measuring 6,011 by 100 feet (1,832 m × 30 m) and 9/27 measuring 3,786 by 75 feet (1,154 m × 23 m). As of 2021, there are 28 aircraft based at this airport. These aircraft include 28 single-engine aircraft.

For the 12-month period ending December 31, 2021, the airport had 8,500 aircraft operations, an average of 23 per day: 99% general aviation and 1% military.

== History ==
Souther Field was one of thirty-two Air Service training camps established after the United States entry into World War I in April 1917. Its history begins in 1918, when on 19 January, the War Department leased 407 acres (165 ha) 4.5 miles (7.2 km) north of the center of Americus, Georgia from Sumter County for a primary training airfield and an aviation supply depot. The Air Service named the facility Souther Field in honor of Major Henry Souther who served as consulting engineer on many of the World War I aviation projects. Major Souther had been killed earlier in the line of duty at Fort Monroe, Virginia. When completed, the base consisted of warehouses, accommodations for 2,000 officers and men, 15 wooden hangars, and a hospital plus other structures.

After the end of the conflict, the War Department deactivated the field and sold its surplus airplanes to the public. One of the surplus aircraft buyers was none other than Charles Lindbergh. In May 1923, Lindbergh paid $500 for a Jenny with a brand-new OX-5 engine, a new paint job, and an extra 20 gal. gasoline tank. He had over 100 Jenny airframes to choose from. Lindbergh aborted his first takeoff attempt on a windy day with his completed Jenny. Lindbergh spent a week practicing at Souther before he finally departed for the barnstorming circuit. In 1928, Sumter County purchased the property.

William J. Graham of Pittsburgh, Pennsylvania founded the Graham Aviation Company in April 1938. By the end of 1940, Graham Aviation managed eight airports in western Pennsylvania and operated several pilot schools as well as one flight instructor school. The Army Air Corps asked Graham if he would consider establishing a Contract Pilot School. A pilot, who had trained at Souther during World War I, suggested the former airfield to Graham for his school. Graham and his staff came to Americus and inspected the site. Finding it satisfactory, he leased the property from Sumter County.

The army deactivated Souther Field at the end of World War II and deeded the land to Americus. In 1948 a portion of Souther Field was chartered for the South Georgia Trade and Vocational School (later South Georgia Technical College).

Two of the three World War II hangars built by Graham Aviation are still standing, one on the college's campus. The warehouse that had served the field since 1918 is privately owned and stands at the western edge of the campus. Souther Field's World War II–era concrete apron (in which are embedded iron tie-downs that secured the Stearman biplane trainers) today is used for campus parking. Opposite the college campus and separated by a stand of trees, today's modernized Souther Field is a public-use airport.

In 1978 Griffin Bell, an Americus native, presented a memorial plaque to Souther Field Airport to commemorate Charles Lindbergh's 1927 solo flight across the Atlantic Ocean. In 1992 a seven-foot bronze statue of Lindbergh, made by University of Georgia art professor and sculptor William J. Thompson, was dedicated. The statue, commissioned by the Sumter County Historic Preservation Society, stands at Souther Field as part of the airport's Lindbergh Monument. Americus celebrated "Lindbergh Days" in 1985 with a public festival and the installation of a state historical marker. Lindbergh's original JN-4 Jenny biplane, purchased and built at Souther Field, is on display at the Cradle of Aviation Museum in Nassau County, New York.

On October 11, 2009, the Americus and Sumter County Airport Authority approved Souther Field's renaming as Jimmy Carter Regional Airport. The new name was initially proposed jointly by the Sumter County Board of Commissioners and the Americus City Council.

== See also ==
- List of airports in Georgia (U.S. state)
