= Jekyll Island Airport =

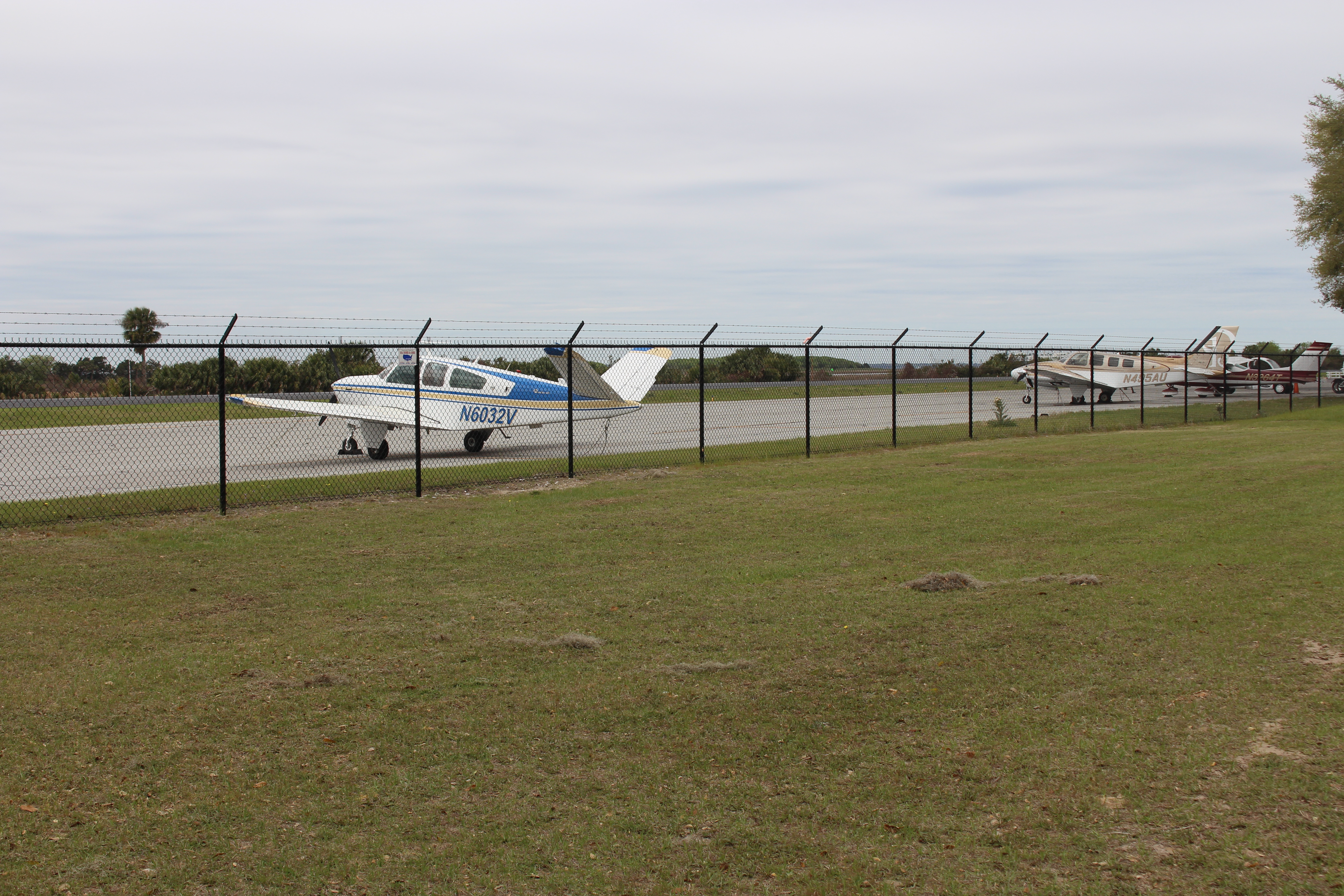
- Runway and airport apron
- IATA: none; ICAO: none; FAA LID: 09J

Summary
- Airport type: Public
- Owner/Operator: Jekyll Island Authority
- Location: Jekyll Island, GA, United States
- Time zone: ET (UTC−5)
- Elevation AMSL: 11 ft / 3.35 m
- Coordinates: 31°4′28″N 81°25′39″W
- Website: https://www.jekyllisland.com/contact-us/

Map
- Location of airport in Georgia

Runways
| Direction | Length | | Surface |
| Direction | ft | m | Surface |
|---|---|---|---|
| 18/36 | 3,715 | 1,132 | Asphalt |

Statistics (2014)
- Based aircraft: 3
- Aircraft operations: 27,040

Jekyll Island Airport is a small general aviation airport located in Jekyll Island, Georgia, United States. It is around 2 miles away from central Jekyll Island.

Due to its small runway size and the nearby Brunswick Golden Isles Airport, no commercial airlines fly there, but scenic tours of the island fly from there. The airport has three based aircraft, and around 74 aircraft operations a day.

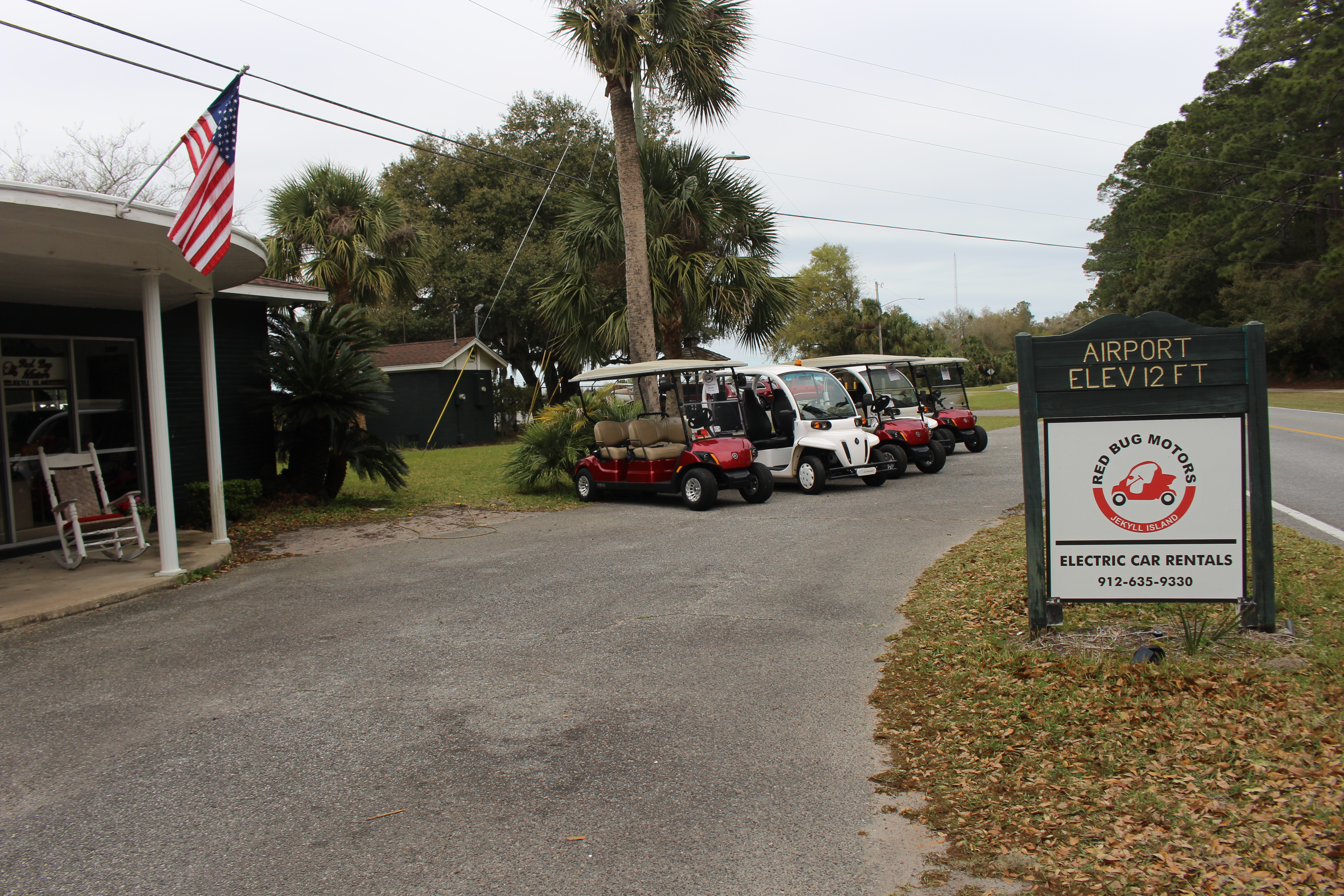
Airport entrance sign

== See also ==
- List of airports in Georgia (U.S. state)
