= Decatur County Industrial Air Park =

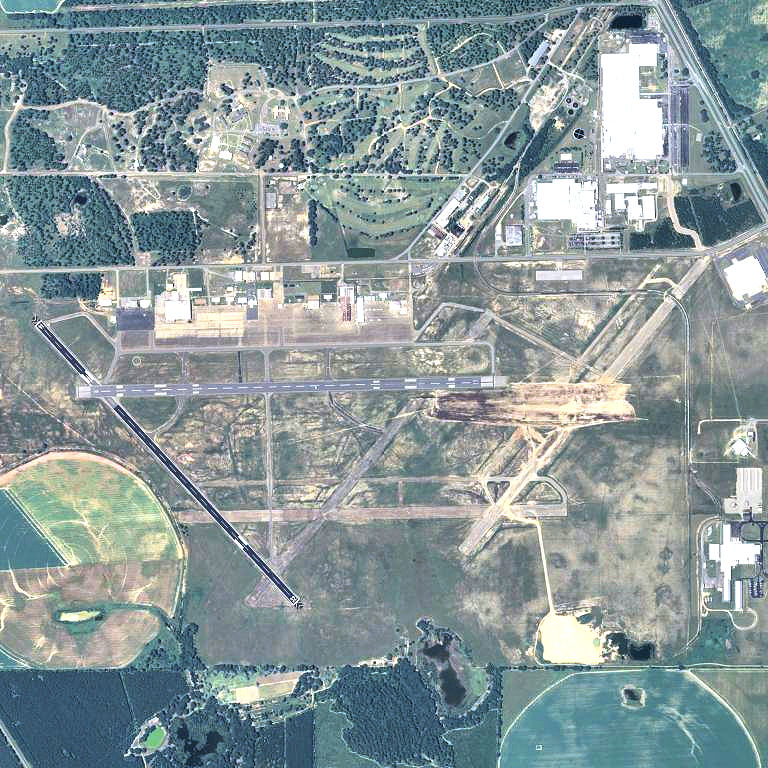
- 2006 USGS airphoto
- IATA: BGE; ICAO: KBGE; FAA LID: BGE

Summary
- Airport type: Public
- Owner: Decatur County
- Serves: Decatur County
- Location: Decatur County, near Bainbridge, Georgia
- Elevation AMSL: 141 ft (43 m)
- Coordinates: 30°58′18″N 084°38′15″W

Map
- Location of Decatur County Industrial Air Park

Runways
Direction	Length		Surface
Direction	ft	m	Surface
9/27	5,502	1,677	Asphalt
14/32	5,003	1,525	Asphalt

Statistics (2021)
- Aircraft operations: 17,350
- Based aircraft: 36
- Source: Federal Aviation Administration

Decatur County Industrial Air Park (IATA: BGE, ICAO: KBGE, FAA LID: BGE) is a county-owned public-use airport located six nautical miles (11 km) northwest of the central business district of Bainbridge, a city in Decatur County, Georgia, United States.

== Facilities and aircraft ==
Decatur County Industrial Air Park Airport covers an area of 940 acres (380 ha) at an elevation of 141 feet (43 m) above mean sea level. It has two asphalt paved runways: 9/27 is 5,502 by 150 feet (1,677 by 46 m); 14/32 is 5,003 by 100 feet (1,525 by 30 m).

For the 12-month period ending December 31, 2021, the airport had 17,350 aircraft operations, an average of 48 per day: 99% general aviation and 1% military. At that time there were 36 aircraft based at this airport: 35 single-engine and 1 multi-engine.

== History ==
Following entry of the United States into World War II, the Chief of the Army Air Corps directed the Air Corps Flying Training Command Southeast Training Center to immediately take action to select air base sites needed to increase its pilot training rate to meet anticipated wartime demands.

A level area near Bainbridge, seven miles (11 km) northwest of the City adjacent to the Seaboard Air Line Railroad was selected by the Air Corps, and the City of Bainbridge and Decatur County purchased 2,070 acres (8.4 km^{2}) for $66,800 and then leased the property to the Army for $1 per annum for a basic flight training base authorizing 89.9 million for its construction.

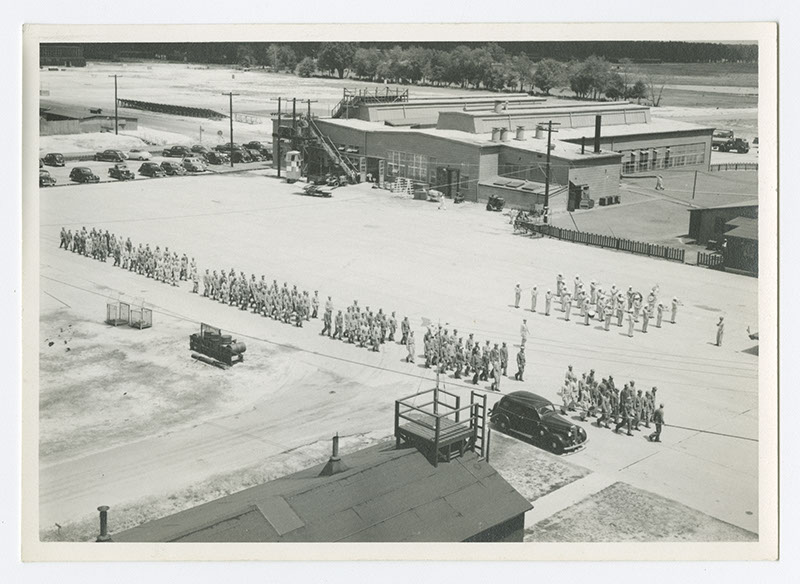
Photograph of mechanics going to work, Bainbridge Army Airfield, 1944

The contractor broke ground on 3 April 1942, for Bainbridge Army Airfield. The immediate construction involved runways and airplane hangars, with concrete runways, several taxiways and a large parking apron and a control tower. Several large hangars were also constructed. Initial construction reached completion on 25 August.

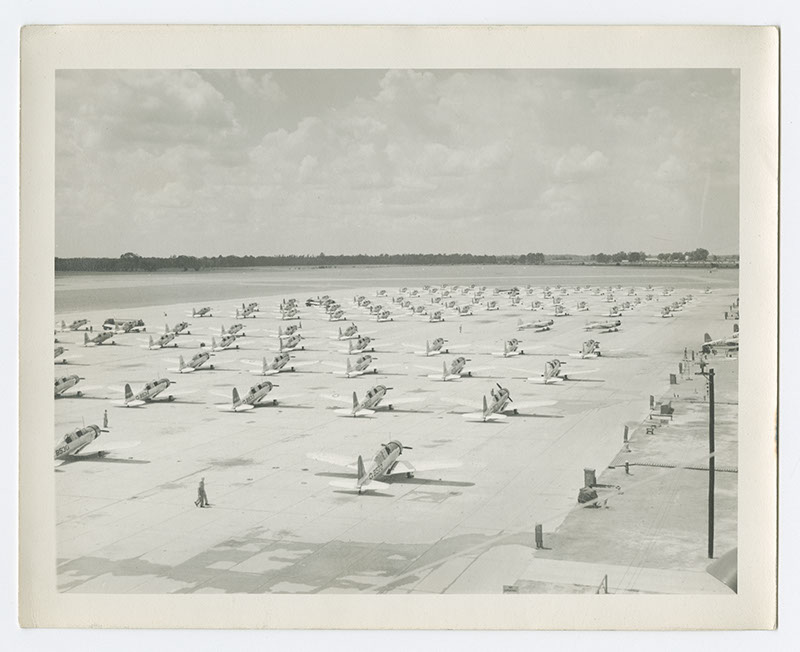
Photograph of airplanes at the Bainbridge Army Airfield, 1944

During World War II, the airfield conducted flight training of new pilots by Army Air Forces Flying Training Command. It was closed on 24 December 1944. With the airfield's closure, the Army Air Force gifted the base to the City and County.

There was little need, however, for the airfield, and in the immediate postwar years, farmers leased the open areas of the airfield for cultivation and the cantonment area was used for various purposes.

As a result of the Korean War which began in 1950 and the expansion of the United States Air Force, Bainbridge Air Base* was reopened to train additional pilots. The base was inactivated and returned to civilian control on 31 March 1961.

Today, Bainbridge is used for various purposes in addition to a small amount of aviation activity. On the former base are several manufacturing plants. For a time, the Southern Airways built student housing was used by a mental health facility. Some of the remaining Southern Airways buildings are occupied by the Georgia Department of Corrections as a prison. The golf course built in the 1950s is still in use, and the World War II hangars are still in use.

Through the years a lot of material has been gathered about the Southern Airways School and Bainbridge Air Base. The information is located at the Decatur County Museum.

== See also ==
- List of airports in Georgia (U.S. state)
