= Greene County Regional Airport =

- IATA: none; ICAO: KCPP; FAA LID: CPP

Summary
- Airport type: Public
- Owner: Greene County
- Location: Greensboro, Georgia
- Elevation AMSL: 677 ft (206 m)
- Coordinates: 33°35′52″N 083°08′20″W
- Interactive map of Greene County Regional Airport

Runways
Direction	Length		Surface
Direction	ft	m	Surface
7/25	5,004	1,525	Asphalt

Statistics (2007)
- Aircraft operations: 9,950
- Based aircraft: 25
- Source: Federal Aviation Administration

Greene County Regional Airport (FAA LID: CPP) (formerly 3J7) is a county-owned public-use airport located three nautical miles (6 km) northeast of the central business district of Greensboro, a city in Greene County, Georgia, United States. As per the FAA's National Plan of Integrated Airport Systems for 2009-2013, it is classified as a general aviation airport.

== Facilities and aircraft ==
Greene County Regional Airport covers an area of 200 acres (81 ha) at an elevation of 677 feet (206 m) above mean sea level. It has one runway designated 7/25 with a 5,004 by 75 ft (1,525 x 23 m) asphalt surface.

For the 12-month period ending August 2, 2007, the airport had 9,950 aircraft operations, an average of 27 per day: 95% general aviation and 5% military. At that time there were 25 aircraft based at this airport: 64% single-engine, 20% multi-engine and 16% jet.

== See also ==
- List of airports in Georgia (U.S. state)
