= W. H. 'Bud' Barron Airport =

Airport in Georgia, United States

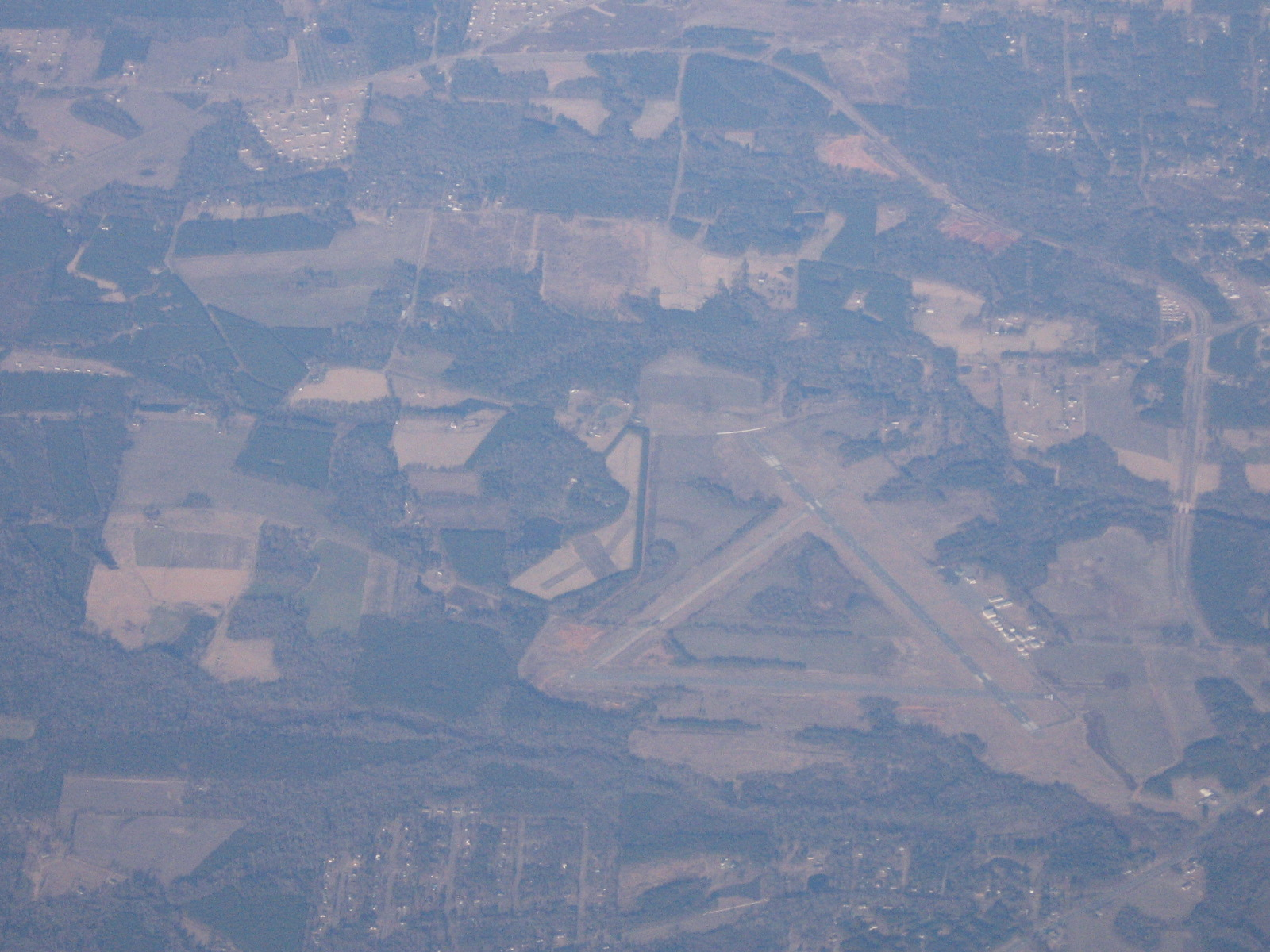
- IATA: DBN; ICAO: KDBN; FAA LID: DBN

Summary
- Airport type: Public
- Owner: Laurens County
- Serves: Dublin, Georgia
- Elevation AMSL: 309 ft / 94 m
- Coordinates: 32°33′52″N 082°59′07″W
- Website: Official website
- Interactive map of W. H. 'Bud' Barron Airport

Runways
| Direction | Length | | Surface |
| Direction | ft | m | Surface |
|---|---|---|---|
| 2/20 | 6,002 | 1,829 | Asphalt |
| 14/32 | 5,004 | 1,525 | Asphalt |

Statistics (2009)
- Aircraft operations: 24,950
- Based aircraft: 32
- Source: Federal Aviation Administration

W. H. 'Bud' Barron Airport (IATA: DBN, ICAO: KDBN, FAA LID: DBN) is a county-owned public-use airport in Laurens County, Georgia, United States. It is located three nautical miles (6 km) northwest of the central business district of Dublin, Georgia.

== Facilities and aircraft ==
W. H. 'Bud' Barron Airport covers an area of 905 acres (366 ha) at an elevation of 309 feet (94 m) above mean sea level. It has two asphalt paved runways: 2/20 is 6,002 by 150 feet (1,829 x 46 m) and 14/32 is 5,004 by 100 feet (1,525 x 30 m).

For the 12-month period ending March 17, 2009, the airport had 24,950 aircraft operations, an average of 68 per day: 99% general aviation and 1% military. At that time there were 32 aircraft based at this airport: 75% single-engine, 22% multi-engine and 3% jet.

== See also ==
- List of airports in Georgia (U.S. state)
