= Davis Airport (Michigan) =

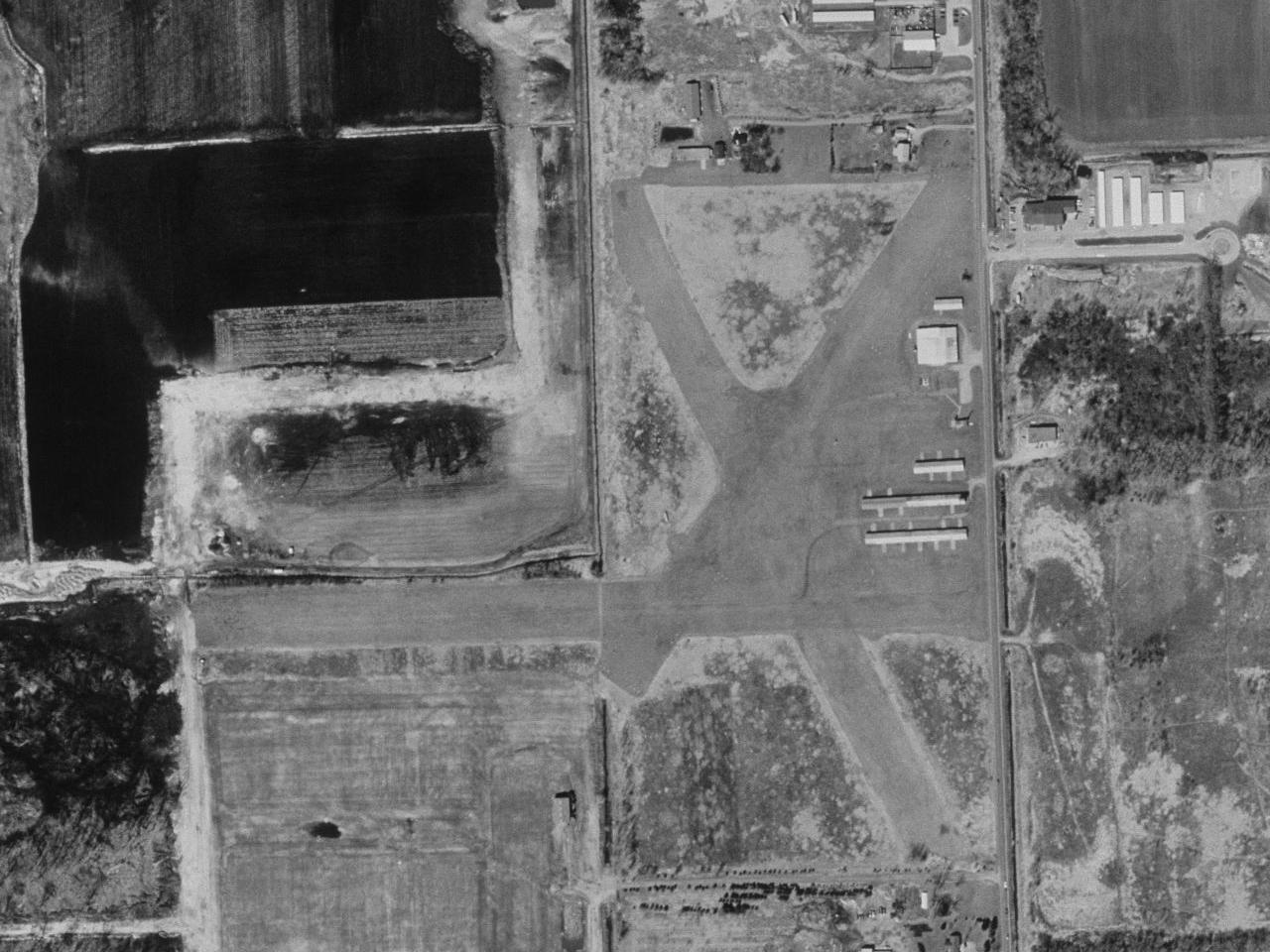
- USGS aerial photograph, April 1999

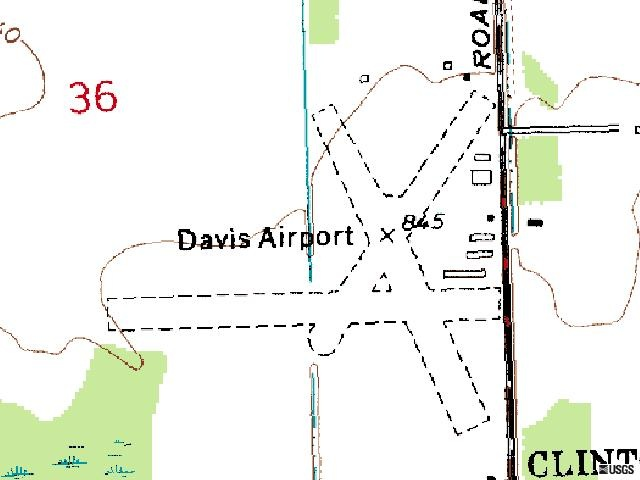
- USGS topographic map, July 1980
- IATA: none; ICAO: none; FAA LID: 2D8

Summary
- Airport type: Public
- Owner: Harvey Sheren
- Serves: East Lansing, Michigan
- Location: DeWitt Township, Michigan
- Elevation AMSL: 845 ft / 258 m
- Coordinates: 42°46′12″N 084°29′24″W
- Interactive map of Davis Airport

Runways
Direction	Length		Surface
Direction	ft	m	Surface
9/27	2,550	777	Turf
16/34	2,460	750	Turf
4/22	2,025	617	Turf
- Abandoned & Little-Known Airfields: Southeastern Michigan

Davis Airport (FAA LID: 2D8) was a general aviation airport located 0.5 miles (0.8 km) north of East Lansing, in DeWitt Township, Michigan, United States.

== Facilities ==
Davis Airport was situated at an elevation of 845 feet (258 m) above mean sea level northwest of the intersection of Coleman Road and Chandler Road in southeast Clinton County. The airport had five hangars at the east end of the airfield.

=== Runways ===
Davis Airport had three runways.

- Runway 9/27: 2,550 feet (777 m), surface: turf
- Runway 16/34: 2,460 feet (750 m), surface: turf
- Runway 4/22: 2,025 feet (617 m), surface: turf

== History ==
Davis Airport is named after Major Arthur J. Davis, a Lansing aviator during the 1920s and 1930s, who operated Michigan Airways, Inc. from a field in East Lansing and at Capital City Airport.

Davis was an original "barnstorming" pilot prior to the war and a few who had the opportunity to fly with him in his "taper wing" Waco F series biplane in the years following the War cherish those memories.

After World War II Davis opened the airport, then located 2.5 miles (4.0 km) north of East Lansing, at the location of Chandler's Marsh. One of the earliest records of the airport is from the November 1954 Milwaukee Sectional Chart, which then depicted Davis Airport as having a 2,100 feet (640 m) unpaved runway.

The airport was the home to many local pilots for years. Many pilots learned to fly at the airport under the instruction of Harold D. Coakley, who became a flight instructor upon the close of WWII after serving in the Army Air Corps.

The airport was managed by Dale H. Sheren for many years, who was a close friend of Art Davis. Sheren managed the airport until his death in 1976.

In January 1992, three man faced five felony charges for larceny, malicious destruction, and breaking into airplanes and a van at the airport. On August 6, 1992, a small plane skidded past a runway, hit an embankment, and flipped over Chandler Road, landing upside down in a ditch.

In 1999 approximately 20 aircraft were based at the airport.

The airport closed on May 5, 2000, and was developed into apartment buildings.

== See also ==
- List of airports in Michigan
- Clinton County, Michigan
- DeWitt Charter Township, Michigan
- East Lansing, Michigan
