= Monroe County Airport =

Monroe County Airport may refer to:

- Monroe County Airport (Alabama) in Monroeville, Alabama, United States (FAA/IATA: MVC)
- Monroe County Airport (Indiana) in Bloomington, Indiana, United States (FAA/IATA: BMG)
- Monroe County Airport (Mississippi) in Aberdeen/Amory, Mississippi, United States (FAA: M40)
- Monroe County Airport (Ohio) in Woodsfield, Ohio, United States (FAA: 4G5)
- Monroe County Airport (Tennessee) in Madisonville, Tennessee, United States (FAA: MNV)
- Tompkinsville-Monroe County Airport in Tompkinsville, Kentucky, United States (FAA: TZV)

== See also ==
- Monroe Airport (disambiguation)
- Monroe Regional Airport (disambiguation)
