= Atlanta Regional Airport =

Public use airport serving Fayette County, Georgia, United States

Atlanta Regional Airport Falcon Field
- IATA: none; ICAO: KFFC; FAA LID: FFC

Summary
- Airport type: Public
- Owner: Peachtree City Airport Authority
- Serves: Atlanta, Georgia
- Location: Peachtree City, Georgia
- Elevation AMSL: 808 ft (246 m)
- Coordinates: 33°21′26″N 084°34′19″W
- Website: atlantaregionalairport.com

Map
- Location of airport in Georgia FFC (the United States)

Runways
Direction	Length		Surface
Direction	ft	m	Surface
13/31	5,768	1,758	Asphalt

Statistics
- Aircraft operations (2016): 75,000
- Based aircraft (2017): 183
- Sources: Airport, FAA, Georgia DOT

Atlanta Regional Airport (ICAO: KFFC, FAA LID: FFC), also known as Falcon Field, is a public use airport in Fayette County, Georgia, United States. It is located 25 nautical miles (29 mi, 46 km) southwest of the central business district of Atlanta, in Peachtree City. This airport is included in the National Plan of Integrated Airport Systems for 2017–2021, which categorized it as a regional general aviation facility.

Owned by Peachtree City Airport Authority, it was formerly known as Peachtree City Airport or Peachtree City - Falcon Field Airport. Falcon Field was named by the first city clerk, Emelil Fancher, in honor of the Atlanta Falcons. It is the location for the National Weather Service's Atlanta forecast office, which serves almost all of northern and central Georgia. Although most U.S. airports use the same three-letter location identifier for the FAA and IATA, Falcon Field is assigned FFC by the FAA but has no designation from the IATA.

== Facilities and aircraft ==
Atlanta Regional Airport covers an area of 350 acres (142 ha) at an elevation of 808 feet (246 m) above mean sea level (MSL). It has one runway designated 13/31 with an asphalt surface measuring 5,768 by 100 feet (1,758 x 30 m).

In 2016, the airport had 75,000 aircraft operations, an average of 205 per day: 99% general aviation and 1% military. In May 2017, there were 183 aircraft based at this airport: 152 single-engine, 23 multi-engine, 3 jet, and 5 helicopter.

Businesses located on-field include:

- Aircraft Spruce & Specialty Co, with a 64,000 sq ft (5,900 m^{2}) distribution facility located adjacent to the field
- Atlanta East Aviation, Part 135 and Part 61 training
- Gardner Aviation
- Georgia Aircraft Interiors
- US Aviation Academy, Part 141 and Part 61 training, and is accredited as a U.S Air Force Training School
- Affordable Charters of Excellence, Part 135
- Commemorative Air Force Air Base Georgia
- Georgia Wing Civil Air Patrol, Peachtree City-Falcon Field Composite Squadron
- ATP Flight School, Part 141

The airport also hosts the Air Dot Show Tour Atlanta stop.

== See also ==
- List of airports in Georgia (U.S. state)
