= Barwick–LaFayette Airport =

Airport in Georgia, United States

- IATA: none; ICAO: none; FAA LID: 9A5

Summary
- Airport type: Public
- Owner: City of LaFayette
- Serves: LaFayette, Georgia
- Elevation AMSL: 777 ft (237 m)
- Coordinates: 34°41′19″N 085°17′25″W
- Website: CityOfLaFayetteGA.org/...
- Interactive map of Barwick–LaFayette Airport

Runways
Direction	Length		Surface
Direction	ft	m	Surface
2/20	5,350	1,631	Asphalt

Statistics (2011)
- Aircraft operations: 6,750
- Based aircraft: 46
- Sources: FAA and city website

Barwick–LaFayette Airport (FAA LID: 9A5) is a city-owned, public-use airport located one nautical mile (2 km) south of the central business district of LaFayette, a city in Walker County, Georgia, United States. It is included in the National Plan of Integrated Airport Systems for 2011–2015, which categorized it as a general aviation facility.

Original construction of the airport was funded by ET Barwick Mills, a major carpet manufacturer of the 1960s and 1970s which operated facilities in and around LaFayette.

== Facilities and aircraft ==
Barwick–LaFayette Airport covers an area of 20 acres (8 ha) at an elevation of 777 feet (237 m) above mean sea level. It has one runway designated 2/20 with an asphalt surface measuring 5,350 by 75 feet (1,631 x 23 m).

For the 12-month period ending July 3, 2011, the airport had 6,750 aircraft operations, an average of 18 per day: 98.5% general aviation and 1.5% military. At that time there were 46 aircraft based at this airport: 87% single-engine, 11% multi-engine, and 2% ultralight.

== See also ==
- List of airports in Georgia (U.S. state)
