= Butler Municipal Airport =

Airport in Butler, Georgia, United States

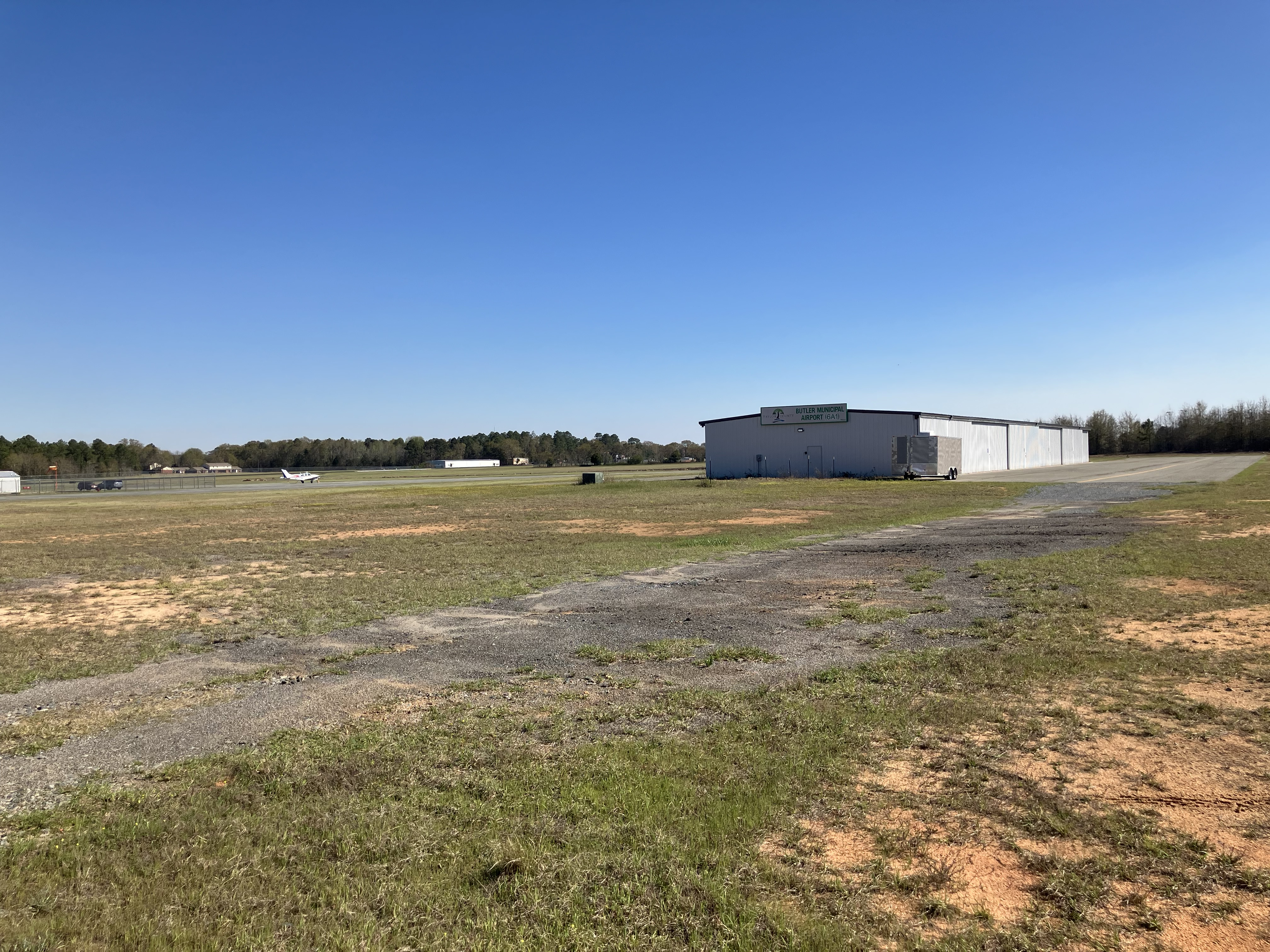
- IATA: none; ICAO: none; FAA LID: 6A1

Summary
- Airport type: Public
- Serves: Butler, Georgia, US
- Coordinates: 32°34′00″N 84°14′46″W
- Interactive map of Butler Municipal Airport

Runways
Direction	Length		Surface
Direction	ft	m	Surface
1/19	5,002	1,525	Asphalt
6/24	2,405	733	Grass
- Sources: FAA

Butler Municipal Airport (FAA LID: 6A1) is a county-owned, public-use airport located one nautical mile (2 km) northwest of the central business district of Butler, the county seat of Taylor County, Georgia, United States. It is included in the National Plan of Integrated Airport Systems for 2011–2015, which categorized it as a general aviation facility.

== History ==
Butler Municipal Airport was opened in May 1941 as a private airfield. It was purchased for $5,000 by the city of Butler in 1947 using the first distribution of funds allocated to communities to assist in the development of airports as laid out in the Federal Airport Act of 1946. Representatives from the Civil Aeronautics Administration flew to the airport from Atlanta to present the $1,250 check to city officials to commemorate the event.

== Facilities ==
Butler Municipal Airport covers an area of 183 acres (74 ha) at an elevation of 667 feet (203 m) above mean sea level. It has two runways that do not intersect. The longer of the two is designated 1/19 with an asphalt surface measuring 5,002 by 75 feet (1,525 x 23 m). The shorter crosswind runway is designated 6/24 with a grass surface measuring 2,405 by 180 feet (733 x 55 m). The airport hosts aerial applicators, a gliding club, and has some maintenance services.

== See also ==
- List of airports in Georgia (U.S. state)
