= Jesup–Wayne County Airport =

Jesup–Wayne County Airport William A. Zorn Airport
- IATA: none; ICAO: KJES; FAA LID: JES

Summary
- Airport type: Public
- Owner: Wayne County
- Serves: Jesup, Georgia
- Elevation AMSL: 107 ft (33 m)
- Coordinates: 31°33′14″N 081°52′57″W

Map
- Location of airport in Georgia

Runways
Direction	Length		Surface
Direction	ft	m	Surface
11/29	5,500	1,676	Asphalt

Statistics (2011)
- Aircraft operations: 5,500
- Based aircraft: 14
- Sources: FAA, Georgia DOT

Jesup–Wayne County Airport (ICAO: KJES, FAA LID: JES) is a county-owned, public-use airport located three nautical miles (6 km) south of the central business district of Jesup, a city in Wayne County, Georgia, United States. It is also known as William A. Zorn Airport.

This airport is included in the National Plan of Integrated Airport Systems for 2011–2015, which categorized it as a general aviation facility. Although most U.S. airports use the same three-letter location identifier for the FAA and IATA, this airport is assigned JES by the FAA but has no designation from the IATA.

== Facilities and aircraft ==
Jesup–Wayne County Airport covers an area of 139 acres (56 ha) at an elevation of 107 feet (33 m) above mean sea level. It has one runway designated 11/29 with an asphalt surface measuring 5,500 by 100 feet (1,676 x 30 m).

For the 12-month period ending December 31, 2011, the airport had 5,500 general aviation aircraft operations, an average of 15 per day. At that time there were 14 aircraft based at this airport: 86% single-engine and 14% ultralight.

== See also ==
- List of airports in Georgia (U.S. state)
