= Telfair–Wheeler Airport =

- IATA: MQW; ICAO: KMQW; FAA LID: MQW

Summary
- Airport type: Public
- Owner: Telfair–Wheeler Airport Authority
- Serves: McRae-Helena, Georgia
- Elevation AMSL: 203 ft (62 m)
- Coordinates: 32°05′49″N 082°52′46″W
- Interactive map of Telfair–Wheeler Airport

Runways
Direction	Length		Surface
Direction	ft	m	Surface
3/21	5,000	1,524	Asphalt

Statistics (2010)
- Aircraft operations: 4,000
- Based aircraft: 11
- Source: Federal Aviation Administration

Telfair–Wheeler Airport (IATA: MQW, ICAO: KMQW, FAA LID: MQW) is a public use airport located three nautical miles (6 km) northeast of the central business district of McRae-Helena, a city in Telfair and Wheeler Counties in the state of Georgia. It is owned by the Telfair–Wheeler Airport Authority. This airport is included in the National Plan of Integrated Airport Systems for 2011–2015, which categorized it as a general aviation facility.

== Facilities and aircraft ==
Telfair–Wheeler Airport covers an area of 104 acres (42 ha) at an elevation of 203 feet (62 m) above mean sea level. It has one runway designated 3/21 with an asphalt surface measuring 5,000 by 75 feet (1,524 x 23 m).

For the 12-month period ending July 16, 2010, the airport had 4,000 general aviation aircraft operations, an average of 10 per day. At that time there were 11 aircraft based at this airport, all single-engine.

== See also ==
- List of airports in Georgia (U.S. state)
