= Baldwin County Airport =

- IATA: MLJ; ICAO: KMLJ; FAA LID: MLJ

Summary
- Airport type: Public
- Owner: Baldwin County
- Serves: Milledgeville, Georgia
- Elevation AMSL: 385 ft (117 m)
- Coordinates: 33°09′15″N 083°14′29″W
- Interactive map of Baldwin County Airport

Runways
Direction	Length		Surface
Direction	ft	m	Surface
10/28	5,509	1,679	Asphalt

Statistics (2022)
- Aircraft operations: 10,000
- Based aircraft: 26
- Source: Federal Aviation Administration

Baldwin County Airport (IATA: MLJ, ICAO: KMLJ, FAA LID: MLJ) is a county-owned, public-use airport in Baldwin County, Georgia, United States. It is located four nautical miles (5 mi, 7 km) north of the central business district of Milledgeville, Georgia. This airport is included in the National Plan of Integrated Airport Systems for 2011–2015, which categorized it as a general aviation facility.

== Facilities and aircraft ==
Baldwin County Airport covers an area of 200 acres (81 ha) at an elevation of 385 feet (117 m) above mean sea level. It has one runway designated 10/28 with an asphalt surface measuring 5,509 by 100 feet (1,679 x 30 m).

For the 12-month period ending December 31, 2022, the airport had 10,000 general aviation aircraft operations, an average of 27 per day. At that time there were 26 aircraft based at this airport: 20 single-engine, 4 multi-engine, and 2 jet.

== See also ==
- List of airports in Georgia (U.S. state)
