= Tom B. David Field =

- IATA: none; ICAO: KCZL; FAA LID: CZL

Summary
- Airport type: Public
- Owner: Calhoun-Gordon County Airport Authority
- Serves: Calhoun, Georgia
- Elevation AMSL: 651 ft / 198 m
- Coordinates: 34°27′20″N 084°56′21″W
- Interactive map of Tom B. David Field

Runways
Direction	Length		Surface
Direction	ft	m	Surface
17/35	6,000	1,829	Asphalt

Statistics (2011)
- Aircraft operations: 16,000
- Based aircraft: 128
- Source: Federal Aviation Administration

Tom B. David Field (ICAO: KCZL, FAA LID: CZL) is a public use airport located three nautical miles (6 km) south of the central business district of Calhoun, a city in Gordon County, Georgia, United States. It is owned by the Calhoun-Gordon County Airport Authority. This airport is included in the National Plan of Integrated Airport Systems for 2011–2015, which categorized it as a general aviation facility.

Although many U.S. airports use the same three-letter location identifier for the FAA and IATA, this facility is assigned CZL by the FAA but has no designation from the IATA (which assigned CZL to Ain el Bey Airport in Constantine, Algeria).

== Facilities and aircraft ==
Tom B. David Field covers an area of 250 acres (101 ha) at an elevation of 651 feet (198 m) above mean sea level. It has one runway designated 17/35 with an asphalt surface measuring 6,000 by 100 feet (1,829 x 30 m).

For the 12-month period ending July 2, 2011, the airport had 16,000 general aviation aircraft operations, an average of 43 per day. At that time there were 128 aircraft based at this airport: 72% single-engine, 7% multi-engine, 17% jet, 3% helicopter, and 1% ultralight.

== See also ==
- List of airports in Georgia (U.S. state)
