= East Georgia Regional Airport =

Airport in Georgia, United States

- IATA: none; ICAO: KSBO; FAA LID: SBO

Summary
- Airport type: Public
- Owner: County of Emanuel and The City of Swainsboro
- Serves: Swainsboro, Georgia
- Elevation AMSL: 327 ft (100 m)
- Coordinates: 32°36′32″N 082°22′11″W
- Website: Official website

Map
- Location of airport in Georgia

Runways
Direction	Length		Surface
Direction	ft	m	Surface
14/32	6,021	1,835	Asphalt

Statistics (2022)
- Aircraft operations: 10,500
- Based aircraft: 14
- Source: Federal Aviation Administration

East Georgia Regional (ICAO: KSBO, FAA LID: SBO) is a city/county-owned public-use airport in Swainsboro, Emanuel County, United States. The airport is located 2 nautical miles (4 km) southeast of the central business district of Swainsboro, Georgia. This airport is included in the National Plan of Integrated Airport Systems for 2011–2015, which categorized it as a general aviation facility.

== Facilities and aircraft ==
East Georgia Regional covers an area of 237 acres (96 ha) at an elevation of 327 feet (100 m) above mean sea level. It has one runway designated 14/32 with an asphalt surface measuring 6,021 x 100 feet (1,835 x 30 m). Runway 14 is equipped with ILS, RNAV and NDB approaches. Runway 32 is equipped for RNAV approaches. The magnetic variation from 2015 is 6 degrees West.

For the 12-month period ending December 31, 2022, the airport had 10,500 aircraft operations, average 29 per day: 90% general aviation and 10% air taxi. At that time there were 14 aircraft based at this airport: 5 single-engine, 5 multi-engine, 1 jet, and 1 glider.

== Accident ==
On August 25, 2018, a Cessna 182A carrying a group of skydivers crashed and burst into flames shortly after takeoff at approximately 2:00 pm EDT, killing the pilot and three of the four passengers.

== See also ==
- List of airports in Georgia (U.S. state)
