= Habersham County Airport =

County-owned public-use airport in Georgia, US

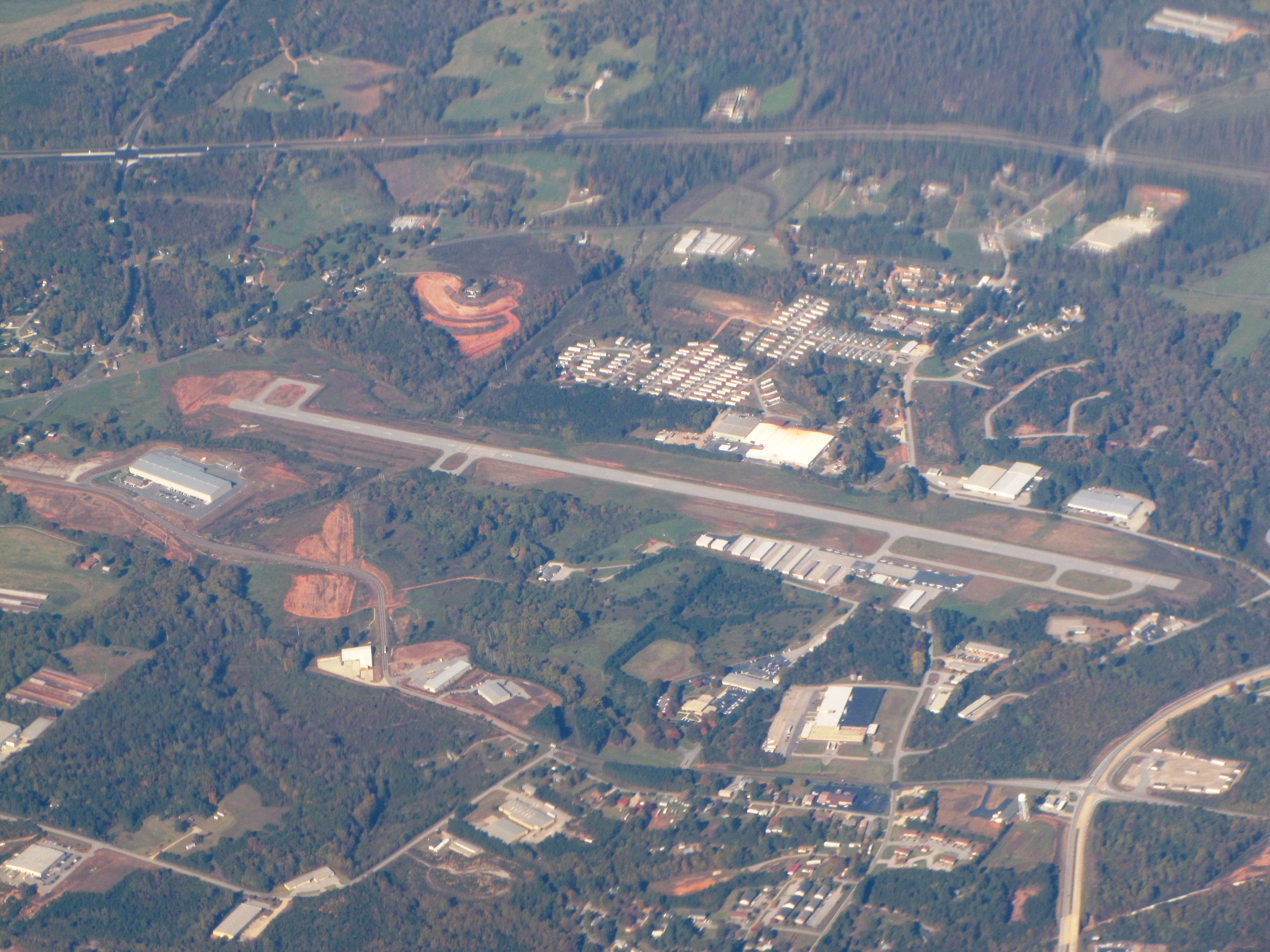
- IATA: none; ICAO: KAJR; FAA LID: AJR

Summary
- Airport type: Public
- Owner/Operator: Habersham County
- Serves: Cornelia, Georgia
- Elevation AMSL: 1,448 ft (441 m)
- Coordinates: 34°29′59″N 083°33′24″W
- Interactive map of Habersham County Airport

Runways
Direction	Length		Surface
Direction	ft	m	Surface
6/24	5,503	1,677	Asphalt

Statistics (2022)
- Aircraft operations: 25,000
- Based aircraft: 75
- Source: Federal Aviation Administration

Habersham County Airport (ICAO: KAJR, FAA LID: AJR) is a county-owned public-use airport located two nautical miles (3.7 km) southwest of the central business district of Cornelia, in Habersham County, Georgia, United States.

Although most U.S. airports use the same three-letter location identifier for the FAA and IATA, this airport is assigned AJR by the FAA but has no designation from the IATA.

== Facilities and aircraft ==
The airport covers an area of 160 acres (65 ha) at an elevation of 1,448 feet (441 m) above mean sea level. It has one asphalt paved runway designated 6/24 which measures 5,503 by 100 feet (1,677 x 30 m).

For the 12-month period ending December 31, 2022, the airport had 25,000 aircraft operations, an average of 68 per day, all of which were general aviation. At that time there were 75 aircraft based at this airport: 69 single-engine, 5 multi-engine and 1 helicopter.

The airport is host to Horizon Dreams Aviation, a small flight school based in hangars H1 and H2 on the airfield. On top of flight training, Horizon Dreams also offers aircraft rentals and aircraft maintenance services.

Air Methods, an air ambulance service, is also based at the airport at the former FBO building.

== See also ==
- List of airports in Georgia (U.S. state)
