= Davis Field (Georgia) =

- IATA: none; ICAO: none; FAA LID: 3J6

Summary
- Airport type: Public
- Owner: Charlton County
- Serves: Folkston, Georgia
- Elevation AMSL: 68 ft (21 m)
- Coordinates: 30°47′47″N 082°01′41″W
- Interactive map of Davis Field

Runways
Direction	Length		Surface
Direction	ft	m	Surface
1/19	2,500	762	Asphalt

Statistics (2006)
- Aircraft operations: 3,000
- Source: Federal Aviation Administration

Davis Field (FAA LID: 3J6) is a county-owned public-use airport located three nautical miles (6 km) southwest of the central business district of Folkston, a city in Charlton County, Georgia, United States.

== Facilities and aircraft ==
Davis Field covers an area of 30 acres (12 ha) at an elevation of 68 feet (21 m) above mean sea level. It has one runway designated 1/19 with a 2,500 by 50 ft (762 x 15 m) asphalt pavement. For the 12-month period ending February 2, 2006, the airport had 3,000 aircraft operations, an average of 250 per month, all of which were general aviation.

== History ==
Davis Field was originally known as Folkston Field and was part of the network of auxiliary airfields located every 45 miles (72 km) on the airmail route between Jacksonville and Atlanta. Being the last airfield before planes reached Jacksonville, the town of Folkston sometimes played host to airmail pilots who were temporarily unable to complete their flight due to inclement weather.

== See also ==
- List of airports in Georgia (U.S. state)
