= Sylvester Airport =

- IATA: SYV; ICAO: KSYV; FAA LID: SYV

Summary
- Airport type: Public
- Owner: City of Sylvester
- Serves: Sylvester, Georgia
- Elevation AMSL: 403 ft / 123 m
- Coordinates: 31°33′25″N 083°53′38″W
- Interactive map of Sylvester Airport

Runways
Direction	Length		Surface
Direction	ft	m	Surface
1/19	4,525	1,379	Asphalt
- Source: Federal Aviation Administration

Sylvester Airport (IATA: SYV, ICAO: KSYV, FAA LID: SYV) is a public-use airport located 3 mi (4.8 km) from the town of Sylvester, Georgia. The National Plan of Integrated Airport Systems for 2011–2015 categorized it as a general aviation facility. It is located on U.S. Route 84.

== Geography ==
Sylvester Airport is located approximately 20 mi (32 km) from the city of Albany, and approximately 21 mi (34 km) from the city of Tifton. The airport is situated within a 30-minute drive of around 135,000 residents.

== Facilities ==
The airport is located at an elevation of 403 ft (123 m). It has one runway: 1/19, which is 4525 x 75 ft. (1379 x 23 m). There is no control tower within the airport.
