= Lee Gilmer Memorial Airport =

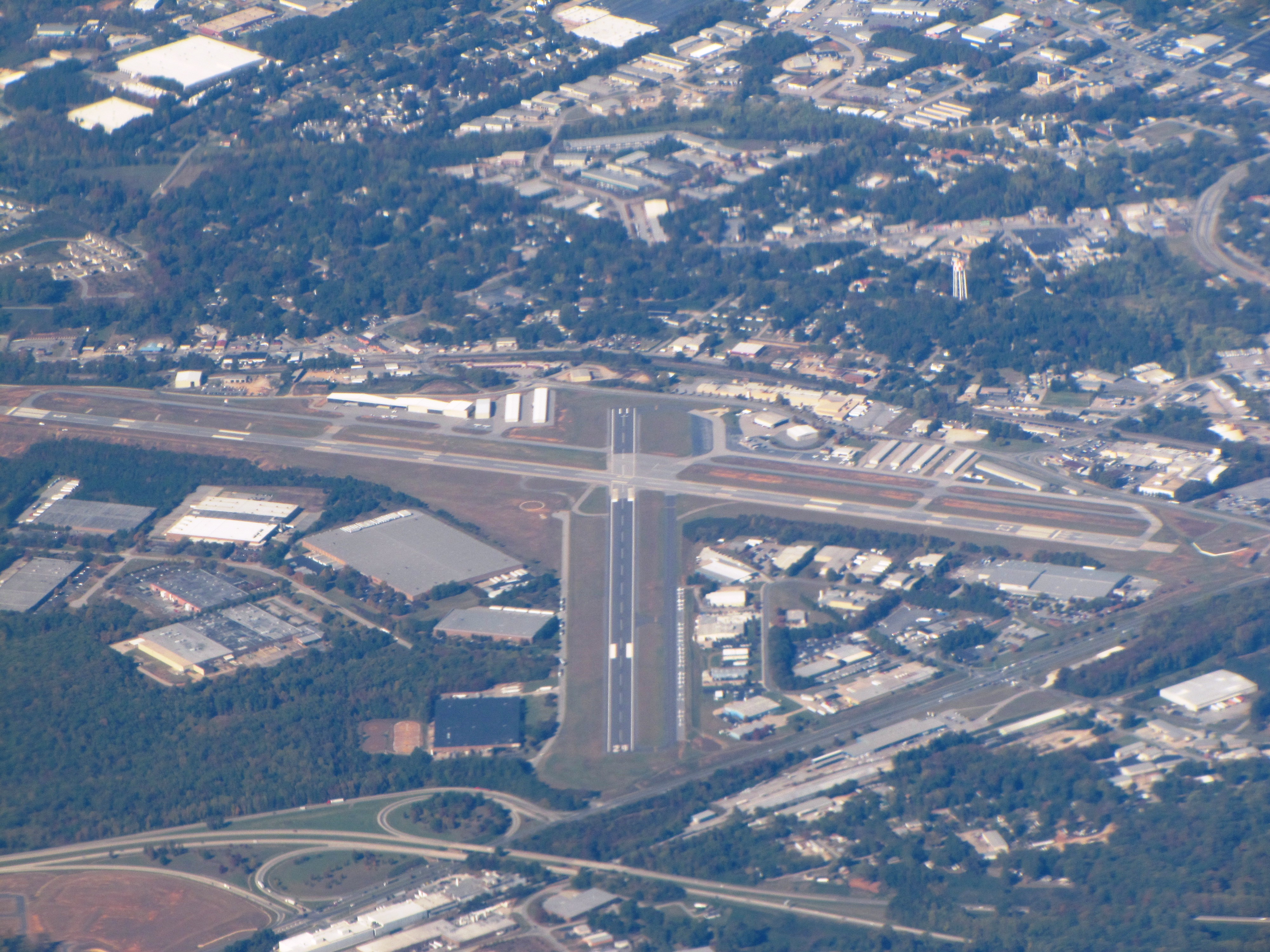
- IATA: GVL; ICAO: KGVL; FAA LID: GVL

Summary
- Airport type: Public
- Owner: City of Gainesville
- Operator: Department of Public Works
- Serves: Gainesville, Georgia
- Elevation AMSL: 1,276 ft / 389 m
- Coordinates: 34°16′21″N 083°49′49″W
- Website: website

Map
- Location of airport in Georgia GVL (the United States)

Runways
Direction	Length		Surface
Direction	ft	m	Surface
5/23	5,500	1,676	Asphalt
11/29	4,001	1,220	Asphalt

Statistics
- Aircraft operations (2014): 38,800
- Based aircraft (2017): 134
- Source: Federal Aviation Administration

Lee Gilmer Memorial Airport (IATA: GVL, ICAO: KGVL, FAA LID: GVL) is a city-owned public-use airport located in Gainesville, a city in Hall County, Georgia, United States.

== History ==
In 1941 only a dirt airstrip existed. At this time a request by the City of Gainesville was placed with the Civil Aeronautics Administration of the United States for a municipal Airport.

In 1943 the US Navy leased the airport land from the City of Gainesville for one dollar to be used by the military during World War II. At that time the Navy had sufficient land to permit development of the intersecting 4000-foot paved runways with parallel taxiways, aircraft and electronics maintenance facilities, barracks and related support facilities.

The base functioned as a satellite of the Naval Air Station at what is now Dekalb-Peachtree Airport. The mission of the Gainesville facility was to train ground personnel in ground controlled approach (GCA) procedures.

Truck-mounted radar was used to track approaching target aircraft. Some of the equipment that was in use at the time can be seen in the black and white photographs in the main terminal building. Some of the buildings that were used can be identified as the terminal and control tower (tower not used since World War II), large radar maintenance hangar, Navy brig, and an aircraft maintenance hangar that still exists today.

In 1947 the facility was decommissioned and returned to the City of Gainesville. In addition to the improvements to the land and runways, all building and equipment became the property of the City of Gainesville.

Over the course of the next 35+ years, from 1964 to the present day, numerous improvements have been made. These have been funded from such sources as the FAA, State of Georgia, Appalachia Fund, General Government Funds, and the City of Gainesville totaling over $4.3 million. These improvements have ranged from relocating beacons, marking the runways and the construction of a parallel taxiway in 1979, to the strengthening and extending of the runways and all of the navigational devices.

In 1971 the airport was named in honor of local aviation pioneer Lee Gilmer, who owned and operated Gilmer Flying Services before, during, and after World War II.

== Facilities and aircraft ==
An untowered airport, Lee Gilmer Memorial Airport is a popular general aviation airport that covers an area of 292 acres (118 ha) and contains two asphalt paved runways: 5/23 measuring 5,500 by 100 ft (1,676 by 30 m) and 11/29 measuring 4,001 by 100 ft (1,220 by 30 m). There is a grass runway adjacent to Runway 29.

Owned and managed by the City of Gainesville, Georgia, it is further served by Champion Aviation (fixed-base operator), AB Aviation (maintenance and repair) and Lanier Flight Center (flight school, aircraft charter and aircraft rental). Chevron and Shell full-service and self-service Jet A and 100LL are available.

For the 12-month period ending December 31, 2014, the airport had 38,800 aircraft operations, an average of 106 per day: 98% general aviation, 1% air taxi and 1% military. In January 2017, there were 134 aircraft based at this airport: 107 single-engine, 19 multi-engine, 7 jet, and 1 helicopter.

The airport has about 100 hangars: 81 T-hangars and 12 corporate hangars which are available to lease for both private and corporate aircraft.

== See also ==
- List of airports in Georgia (U.S. state)
