= Monroe–Walton County Airport =

- IATA: none; ICAO: none; FAA LID: D73

Summary
- Airport type: Public
- Owner: City of Monroe
- Serves: Monroe, Georgia
- Elevation AMSL: 875 ft / 267 m
- Coordinates: 33°46′57″N 083°41′34″W
- Interactive map of Monroe–Walton County Airport

Runways
Direction	Length		Surface
Direction	ft	m	Surface
3/21	5,000	1,524	Asphalt

Statistics (2022)
- Aircraft operations: 13,000
- Based aircraft: 30
- Source: Federal Aviation Administration

Monroe–Walton County Airport (FAA LID: D73) is a city-owned, public-use airport located one nautical mile (2 km) southeast of the central business district of Monroe, a city in Walton County, Georgia, United States. It is included in the National Plan of Integrated Airport Systems for 2011–2015, which categorized it as a general aviation facility.

== Facilities and aircraft ==
Monroe–Walton County Airport covers an area of 70 acres (28 ha) at an elevation of 875 feet (267 m) above mean sea level. It has one runway designated 3/21 with an asphalt surface measuring 5,000 by 75 feet (1,524 x 23 m).

For the 12-month period ending December 31, 2022, the airport had 13,000 general aviation aircraft operations, an average of 36 per day. At that time there were 30 aircraft based at this airport: 28 single-engine, and 2 glider.

== See also ==
- List of airports in Georgia (U.S. state)
