= Abandoned & Little-Known Airfields =

Airport database website

- Website type: Private
- Available in: English
- Owner: Paul Freeman
- Creator: Paul Freeman
- Website: www.airfieldsfreeman.com
- Commercial: No
- Registration: No
- Launched: April 1999; 27 years ago
- Current status: Online

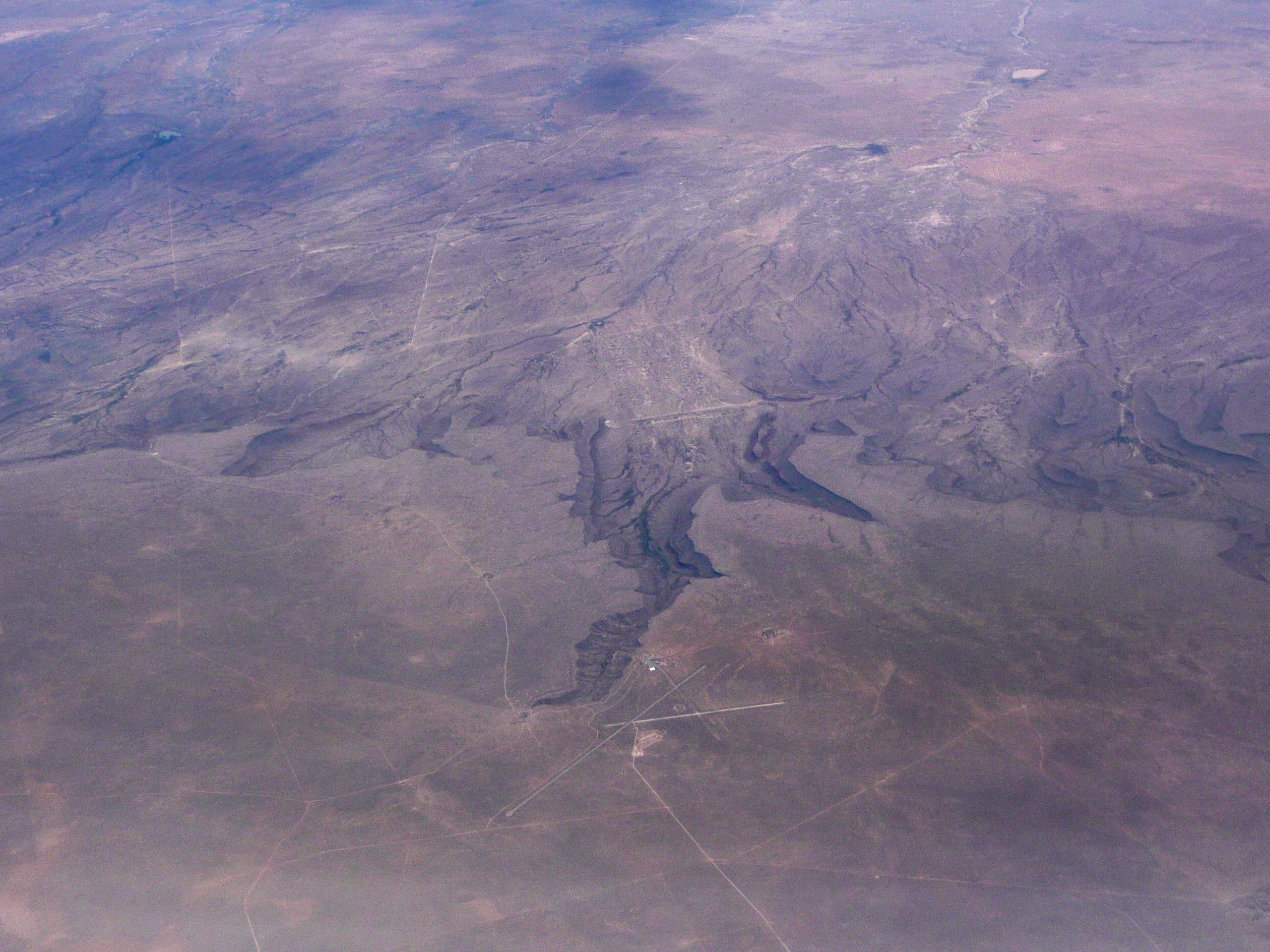
MacGuire Ranch Airfield, El Paso, Texas, one of the airports in the database

Abandoned & Little-Known Airfields is a website detailing information and first hand memories about airports in the United States which are no longer in operation, or are rarely used.

The website was started by Paul Freeman in 1999 as he had developed an interest on the subject. In 2015, there were over 2,000 airports chronicled on the site and it had been viewed over 1.7 million times. In the US, airports close at about a rate of one per week.
