= Harris County Airport =

- IATA: PIM; ICAO: KPIM; FAA LID: PIM

Summary
- Airport type: Public
- Owner: Harris County
- Serves: Pine Mountain, Georgia
- Elevation AMSL: 902 ft (275 m)
- Coordinates: 32°50′26″N 084°52′57″W
- Interactive map of Harris County Airport

Runways
| Direction | Length | | Surface |
| Direction | ft | m | Surface |
|---|---|---|---|
| 9/27 | 5,002 | 1,525 | Asphalt |

Statistics (2008)
- Aircraft operations: 6,000
- Source: Federal Aviation Administration

Harris County Airport (IATA: PIM, ICAO: KPIM, FAA LID: PIM) is a county-owned public-use airport in Harris County, Georgia, United States. It is located two nautical miles (3.7 km) southwest of the central business district of Pine Mountain, Georgia. According to the FAA's National Plan of Integrated Airport Systems for 2009–2013, it is categorized as a general aviation facility. It was formerly known as Callaway Gardens-Harris County Airport.

== Facilities and aircraft ==
Harris County Airport covers an area of 141 acres (57 ha) at an elevation of 902 feet (275 m) above mean sea level. It has one runway designated 9/27 with an asphalt surface measuring 5,002 by 100 feet (1,525 x 30 m). For the 12-month period ending April 2, 2008, the airport had 6,000 general aviation aircraft operations, an average of 16 per day.

== See also ==
- List of airports in Georgia (U.S. state)
