= Davis Airport (Maryland) =

Airport in Montgomery County, Maryland

- IATA: none; ICAO: none; FAA LID: W50

Summary
- Airport type: Public use
- Owner: Laytonsville Airport, LLC.
- Serves: Laytonsville, Maryland
- Elevation AMSL: 609 ft (186 m)
- Coordinates: 39°14′37″N 077°09′01″W
- Website: LaytonsvilleAirport.com

Map
- Location of airport in Maryland

Runways
Direction	Length		Surface
Direction	ft	m	Surface
8/26	2,000	610	Asphalt

Statistics (2023)
- Aircraft operations (year ending 4/6/2023): 5,100
- Based aircraft: 17
- Source: Federal Aviation Administration

Davis Airport (FAA LID: W50) is a privately owned, public use airport located three nautical miles (6 km) north of the central business district of Laytonsville, in Montgomery County, Maryland, United States.

== Facilities and aircraft ==
Davis Airport covers an area of 20 acres (8 ha) at an elevation of 609 feet (186 m) above mean sea level. It has one runway designated 8/26 with an asphalt surface measuring 2,600 x 50 feet (792 x 15 meters).

For the 12-month period ending April 6, 2023, the airport had 5,100 general aviation aircraft operations, an average of 98 per week. At that time there were 17 aircraft based at this airport, all single-engine.
