= Charlotte–Monroe Executive Airport =

- IATA: none; ICAO: KEQY; FAA LID: EQY

Summary
- Airport type: Public
- Owner: City of Monroe
- Serves: Monroe, North Carolina
- Elevation AMSL: 683 ft (208 m)
- Coordinates: 35°01′08″N 080°37′13″W
- Interactive map of Charlotte–Monroe Executive Airport

Runways
Direction	Length		Surface
Direction	ft	m	Surface
5/23	7,001	2,134	Asphalt

Statistics (2021)
- Aircraft operations (year ending 9/4/2021): 56,100
- Based aircraft: 122
- Source: Federal Aviation Administration

Charlotte–Monroe Executive Airport (ICAO: KEQY, FAA LID: EQY) is a public use airport located five nautical miles (9 km) northwest of the central business district of Monroe, a city in Union County, North Carolina, United States. It is owned by the City of Monroe and was formerly known as Monroe Regional Airport.

According to the FAA's National Plan of Integrated Airport Systems for 2009–2013, it is a reliever airport for Charlotte/Douglas International Airport.

Although many U.S. airports use the same three-letter location identifier for the FAA and IATA, this airport is assigned EQY by the FAA but has no designation from the IATA.

== Facilities and aircraft ==
Charlotte–Monroe Executive Airport covers an area of 206 acres (83 ha) at an elevation of 683 feet (208 m) above mean sea level. It has one runway designated 5/23 with an asphalt surface measuring 7,001 by 100 feet (2,134 x 30 m).

For the 12-month period ending September 4, 2021, the airport had 56,100 aircraft operations, an average of 154 per day: 91% general aviation, 7% air taxi, and 1% military. At that time there were 122 aircraft based at this airport: 105 single-engine, 10 multi-engine, and 7 jet.

As of October 18, 2007, the City of Monroe was requesting funding from state and federal sources for $25 million in improvements to Monroe Regional Airport. These improvements, to be finished by the summer of 2009, included extending the runway to up to 7500 feet, adding more hangars, and expanding the terminal.

== See also ==
- List of airports in North Carolina
