= Crisp County–Cordele Airport =

Airport in Georgia, US

Crisp County–Cordele Airport Cordele Army Airfield
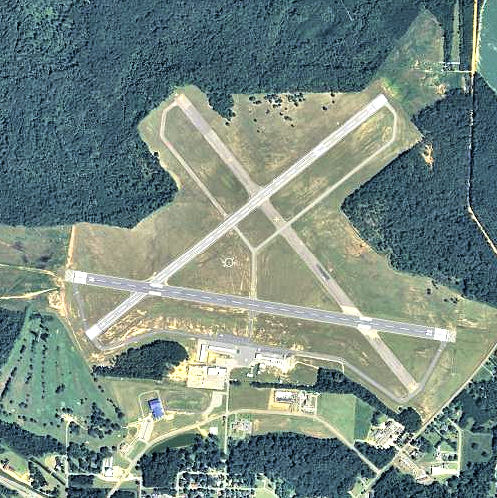
- 2006 USGS airphoto
- IATA: none; ICAO: KCKF; FAA LID: CKF

Summary
- Airport type: Public
- Owner: Crisp County
- Serves: Cordele, Georgia
- Elevation AMSL: 310 ft (94 m)
- Coordinates: 31°59′20″N 83°46′26″W

Map
- Location of airport in Georgia

Runways
Direction	Length		Surface
Direction	ft	m	Surface
10/28	5,001	1,524	Asphalt
5/23	5,006	1,526	Asphalt

Statistics (2010)
- Aircraft operations: 22,000
- Based aircraft: 16
- Source: Federal Aviation Administration

Crisp County–Cordele Airport (ICAO: KCKF, FAA LID: CKF) is a county-owned, public-use airport located two nautical miles (4 km) northeast of the central business district of Cordele, a city in Crisp County, Georgia, United States. It is included in the National Plan of Integrated Airport Systems for 2011–2015, which categorized it as a general aviation facility. The airport does not have scheduled commercial airline service.

== History ==
Opened to the public in March 1943, during World War II, the airport was requisitioned by the United States Army Air Force, and was known as Cordele Army Airfield. It was also known as Turner AAF Auxiliary Airfield No. 7. The airfield supported the AAF Advanced Pilot School (Twin-Engine) school at Turner Army Airfield.

It was closed in mid-1944 with the drawdown of AAFTC's pilot training program. Declared surplus, it was turned over to the Army Corps of Engineers on September 30, 1945 and eventually discharged to the War Assets Administration (WAA) to become a civil airport.

== Facilities and aircraft ==
Crisp County–Cordele Airport covers an area of 619 acres (251 ha) at an elevation of 310 feet (94 m) above mean sea level. It has two asphalt paved runways: 10/28 is 5,001 by 150 feet (1,524 x 46 m) and 5/23 is 5,006 by 100 feet (1,526 x 30 m).

For the 12-month period ending August 10, 2010, the airport had 22,000 general aviation aircraft operations, an average of 60 per day. At that time there were 16 aircraft based at this airport: 94% single-engine and 6% helicopter.

== See also ==
- Georgia World War II Army Airfields
- List of airports in Georgia (U.S. state)

== Other sources ==
- Manning, Thomas A. (2005), History of Air Education and Training Command, 1942–2002. Office of History and Research, Headquarters, AETC, Randolph AFB, Texas OCLC 71006954, 29991467
- Shaw, Frederick J. (2004), Locating Air Force Base Sites, History's Legacy, Air Force History and Museums Program, United States Air Force, Washington DC. OCLC 57007862, 1050653629
- Shettle, M. L. (2005), Georgia's Army Airfields of World War II. ISBN 0-9643388-3-1
