= Woolsey, Georgia =

- Town
- Location in Fayette County and the state of Georgia
- Coordinates: 33°21′48″N 84°24′29″W
- Country: United States
- State: Georgia
- County: Fayette

Government
  - Mayor: Gary Laggis

Area
  - Total: 0.84 sq mi (2.18 km^{2})
  - Land: 0.82 sq mi (2.12 km^{2})
  - Water: 0.023 sq mi (0.06 km^{2})
- Elevation: 837 ft (255 m)

Population (2020)
  - Total: 206
  - Density: 251.9/sq mi (97.25/km^{2})
- Time zone: UTC-5 (Eastern (EST))
  - Summer (DST): UTC-4 (EDT)
- ZIP code: 30215
- Area code: 770
- FIPS code: 13-84288
- GNIS feature ID: 0333466
- Website: woolseyga.com

Woolsey is a town in Fayette County, Georgia, United States. The population was 206 in 2020.

== History ==
The Georgia General Assembly incorporated Woolsey as a town in 1893. Woolsey is named after a prominent doctor who served in the Confederacy before being injured.

== Geography ==
Woolsey is located in southeastern Fayette County at 33°21′48″N 84°24′29″W (33.363354, -84.407942), along Georgia State Route 92. Fayetteville, the county seat, is 7 miles (11 km) to the north, and Griffin is 18 miles (29 km) to the southeast.

According to the United States Census Bureau, Woolsey has a total area of 0.84 square miles (2.18 km^{2}), of which 0.82 square miles (2.12 km^{2}) is land and 0.02 square miles (0.06 km^{2}), or 2.76%, is water.

== Demographics ==
Historical population
| Census | Pop. | Note | %± |
|---|---|---|---|
| 1910 | 162 | | — |
| 1920 | 148 | | −8.6% |
| 1930 | 122 | | −17.6% |
| 1940 | 115 | | −5.7% |
| 1950 | 90 | | −21.7% |
| 1960 | 114 | | 26.7% |
| 1970 | 91 | | −20.2% |
| 1980 | 99 | | 8.8% |
| 1990 | 120 | | 21.2% |
| 2000 | 175 | | 45.8% |
| 2010 | 158 | | −9.7% |
| 2020 | 206 | | 30.4% |
U.S. Decennial Census

In 2000, there were 175 people, 57 households, and 49 families residing in the town. By 2020, its population was 206.

In 2000, the median income for a household in the town was $84,103, and the median income for a family was $83,224. Males had a median income of $76,250 versus $62,813 for females. The per capita income for the town was $42,177. About 4.5% of families and 3.0% of the population were below the poverty line, including 4.2% of those under the age of eighteen and none of those 65 or over.
