= Ribosomal protein L10 leader =

Putative ribosomal protein leader family

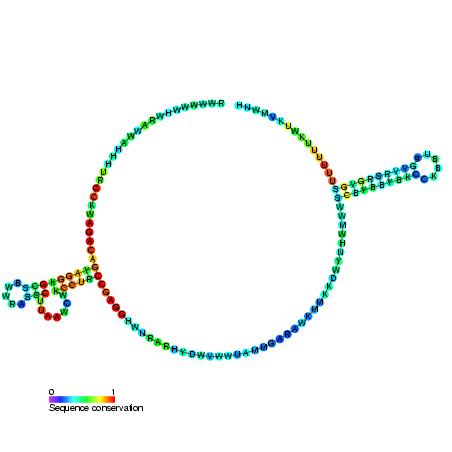
- Predicted secondary structure and sequence conservation of L10_leader

Identifiers
- Symbol: L10_leader
- Rfam: RF00557

Other data
- RNA type: Cis-reg; leader
- Domain(s): Bacteria
- SO: SO:0000233
- PDB structures: PDBe

This family is a putative ribosomal protein leader autoregulatory structure found in B. subtilis and other low-GC Gram-positive bacteria. It is located in the 5′ untranslated regions of mRNAs encoding ribosomal proteins L10 and L12 (rplJ-rplL). A Rho-independent transcription terminator structure that is probably involved in regulation is included at the 3′ end.

Other ribosomal protein leaders identified in the same study include those of L13, L19, L20 and L21.
