= L25 =

L25 may refer to:

- 50S ribosomal protein L25
- L25 ribosomal protein leader
- HMS L25, a submarine of the Royal Navy
- HMS Scarborough (L25), a sloop of the Royal Navy
- HMS Southdown (L25), a destroyer of the Royal Navy
- Klemm L.25, a German monoplane
- McDonnell L-25, an American experimental convertiplane
