= L31 =

L31 may refer to:

- L31 ribosomal protein leader
- 60S ribosomal protein L31
- HMS Chiddingfold (L31), a destroyer of the Royal Navy
- Nissan Altima (L31), a Japanese automobile
- Spanish landing ship Galicia (L31)
- St. Tammany Regional Airport, in St. Tammany Parish, Louisiana
- Zeppelin LZ 72, an airship of the Imperial German Navy
