= KPTN =

KPTN may refer to:

- KPTN-LD, a low-power television station (channel 19, virtual 7) licensed to serve St. Louis, Missouri, United States
- Harry P. Williams Memorial Airport (ICAO code KPTN)
- Kaptin (actin binding protein), human gene
