= List of airports in Louisiana =

This is a list of airports in Louisiana (a U.S. state), grouped by type and sorted by location. It contains all public-use and military airports in the state. Some private-use and former airports may be included where notable, such as airports that were previously public-use, those with commercial enplanements recorded by the FAA or airports assigned an IATA airport code.

== Airports ==
This list contains the following information:

- **City served** – The city generally associated with the airport, as per the airport's master record with the Federal Aviation Administration. This is not always the actual location since some airports are located in smaller towns outside of the city they serve. It is not meant to be a complete list of cities served, which can be found in or added to each airport's Wikipedia article.
- **FAA** – The location identifier assigned by the Federal Aviation Administration (FAA). These are linked to each airport's page at the Louisiana Department of Transportation and Development.
- **IATA** – The airport code assigned by the International Air Transport Association (IATA). Those that do not match the FAA code are shown in bold.
- **ICAO** – The location indicator assigned by the International Civil Aviation Organization (ICAO).
- **Airport name** – The official airport name. Those shown in **bold** indicate the airport has scheduled passenger service on commercial airlines.
- **Role** – One of four FAA airport categories, as per the 2021–2025 National Plan of Integrated Airport Systems (NPIAS) report released September 2020:
  - P-s: Commercial service – primary are publicly owned airports that receive scheduled passenger service and have more than 10,000 passenger boardings (enplanements) each year. Each primary airport is sub-classified by the FAA as one of the following four "hub" types (s):
    - L: Large hub that accounts for at least 1% of total U.S. passenger enplanements.
    - M: Medium hub that accounts for between 0.25% and 1% of total U.S. passenger enplanements.
    - S: Small hub that accounts for between 0.05% and 0.25% of total U.S. passenger enplanements.
    - N: Nonhub that accounts for less than 0.05% of total U.S. passenger enplanements, but more than 10,000 annual enplanements.
  - CS: Commercial service – nonprimary are publicly owned airports that receive scheduled passenger service and have at least 2,500 passenger boardings each year.
  - R: Reliever airports are designated by the FAA to relieve congestion at a large commercial service airport and to provide more general aviation access to the overall community.
  - GA: General aviation airports are the largest single group of airports in the U.S. airport system. They are public-use airports that do not have scheduled service or have scheduled service with less than 2,500 passenger boardings each year.
- **Enplanements** – The number of enplanements (commercial passenger boardings) that occurred at the airport in calendar year 2024, as per FAA records released 2025.

City served	FAA	IATA	ICAO	Airport name	Role	Enplanements (2024)
				**Commercial service – primary airports**		
Alexandria	AEX	AEX	KAEX	**Alexandria International Airport**	P-N	204,603
Baton Rouge	BTR	BTR	KBTR	**Baton Rouge Metropolitan Airport** (Ryan Field)	P-N	419,446
Lafayette	LFT	LFT	KLFT	**Lafayette Regional Airport** (Paul Fournet Field)	P-N	264,471
Lake Charles	LCH	LCH	KLCH	**Lake Charles Regional Airport**	P-N	90,791
Monroe	MLU	MLU	KMLU	**Monroe Regional Airport**	P-N	105,274
New Orleans	MSY	MSY	KMSY	**Louis Armstrong New Orleans International Airport**	P-M	6,537,092
Shreveport	SHV	SHV	KSHV	**Shreveport Regional Airport**	P-N	352,281
				**Reliever airports**		
New Orleans	NEW	NEW	KNEW	Lakefront Airport	R	155
Slidell	ASD		KASD	Slidell Airport	R	0
				**General aviation airports**		
Abbeville	IYA		KIYA	Abbeville Chris Crusta Memorial Airport	GA	21
Alexandria	ESF	ESF	KESF	Esler Regional Airport	GA	1
Bastrop	BQP		KBQP	Morehouse Memorial Airport	GA	0
Bogalusa	BXA	BXA	KBXA	George R. Carr Memorial Air Field	GA	0
Coushatta	0R7			The Red River Airport (Red River Parish Airport)	GA	0
Covington	L31			St. Tammany Regional Airport	GA	6
Crowley	3R2			Le Gros Memorial Airport	GA	0
DeQuincy	5R8			DeQuincy Industrial Airpark	GA	0
DeRidder	DRI	DRI	KDRI	Beauregard Regional Airport	GA	0
Eunice	4R7	UCE		Eunice Airport	GA	0
Farmerville	F87			Union Parish Airport	GA	0
Galliano	GAO		KGAO	South Lafourche Leonard Miller Jr. Airport	GA	0
Gonzales	REG		KREG	Louisiana Regional Airport	GA	0
Hammond	HDC		KHDC	Hammond Northshore Regional Airport	GA	8
Homer	5F4			Homer Municipal Airport	GA	0
Houma	HUM	HUM	KHUM	Houma-Terrebonne Airport	GA	4
Jena	1R1			Jena Airport	GA	0
Jennings	3R7			Jennings Airport	GA	6
Jonesboro	F88			Jonesboro Airport	GA	0
Jonesville	L32			Jonesville Airport (Jonesville Municipal Airport)	GA	0
Lake Charles	CWF	CWF	KCWF	Chennault International Airport	GA	285
Lake Providence	0M8			Byerley Airport	GA	0
Leesville	L39			Leesville Airport	GA	0
Mansfield	3F3			C.E. 'Rusty' Williams Airport (De Soto Parish Airport)	GA	0
Many	3R4			Hart Airport	GA	0
Marksville	MKV		KMKV	Marksville Municipal Airport	GA	0
Minden	MNE		KMNE	Minden Airport (was Minden-Webster Airport)	GA	0
Natchitoches	IER		KIER	Natchitoches Regional Airport	GA	0
New Iberia	ARA	ARA	KARA	Acadiana Regional Airport	GA	5
New Roads	HZR		KHZR	False River Regional Airport	GA	0
Oak Grove	9M6			Kelly-Dumas Airport (was Kelly Airport)	GA	0
Oakdale	ACP		KACP	Allen Parish Airport	GA	0
Opelousas	OPL	OPL	KOPL	St. Landry Parish Airport (Ahart Field)	GA	0
Patterson	PTN	PTN	KPTN	Harry P. Williams Memorial Airport	GA	1
Rayville	M79			John H. Hooks Jr. Memorial Airport	GA	0
Reserve	APS		KAPS	Port of South Louisiana Executive Regional Airport	GA	0
Ruston	RSN	RSN	KRSN	Ruston Regional Airport	GA	4
Shreveport	DTN	DTN	KDTN	Shreveport Downtown Airport	GA	0
Springhill	SPH		KSPH	Springhill Airport	GA	0
Sulphur	UXL		KUXL	Southland Field	GA	0
Tallulah / Vicksburg, MS	TVR		KTVR	Vicksburg Tallulah Regional Airport (Vicksburg-Tallulah Regional)	GA	0
Thibodaux	L83			Thibodaux Municipal Airport	GA	0
Vidalia	0R4			Concordia Parish Airport	GA	0
Vivian	3F4			Vivian Airport	GA	0
Winnfield	0R5			David G. Joyce Airport	GA	0
Winnsboro	F89			Winnsboro Municipal Airport	GA	0
				**Other public-use airports** (not listed in NPIAS)		
Arcadia	5F0			Arcadia-Bienville Parish Airport		
Bristol	L89			Kibs Air Park		
Bunkie	2R6			Bunkie Municipal Airport		
Columbia	F86			Caldwell Parrish Airport (was Columbia Airport)		
Delhi	0M9			Delhi Municipal Airport		
Franklinton	2R7			Franklinton Airport		
Grand Isle	GNI		KGNI	Grand Isle Seaplane Base		
Jeanerette	2R1			Le Maire Memorial Airport		
Keithville	5F5			Bluebird Hill Airport		
Olla	L47			Olla Airport		
Pineville	2L0			Pineville Municipal Airport		
Pollock	L66			Pollock Municipal Airport (Pollock Airport)		
St. Joseph	L33			Tensas Parish Airport		5
Tallulah	M80			Scott Airport		
Welsh	6R1			Welsh Airport		
Woodworth	1R4			Woodworth Airport		
				**Other military airports**		
Bossier City	BAD	BAD	KBAD	Barksdale Air Force Base		844
Fort Johnson	POE	POE	KPOE	Maks Army Airfield		
New Orleans	NBG	NBG	KNBG	NAS JRB New Orleans (Alvin Callender Field)		
				**Notable private-use airports**		
Ama	LS40			St. Charles Airport (Ama Airport)		
Belle Chasse	65LA	BCS		Southern Seaplane Airport		
Breaux Bridge	LS34			Bordelon Airpark (was public-use, FAA: L28)		
Newellton	LS83			Kifer Airport (was public-use Newellton Airport, FAA: 9M2)		
Oil City	LA11			Thackers Airport (was public-use, FAA: 5F8)		
Thornwell	LS14			Lyon Airport (was public-use, FAA: 3L0)		
				**Notable former airports**		
Baton Rouge	~~EBR~~			Downtown Airport (closed 1976)		
Colfax	~~L40~~			Colfax Airport (closed 2007-2008?)		
Haynesville	~~5F3~~			Haynesville Airport (closed 2006)		
Houma	~~3L1~~			Charlie Hammonds Seaplane Base (closed 2007?)		
Lake Charles	~~4R5~~			East Lake Charles Airport (closed 1980s-1990s)		
New Orleans	~~7N0~~			New Orleans Downtown Heliport		
Ruston	~~RSN~~			Ruston Municipal Airport (closed 1995)		

== See also ==
- Louisiana World War II Army Airfields
- Wikipedia:WikiProject Aviation/Airline destination lists: North America#Louisiana
