= L19 =

L19, L-19 or L.19 may refer to:

== Vehicles ==
- Cessna L-19 Bird Dog, an American liaison aircraft
- HMS L19, a submarine of the Royal Navy
- HMS Haldon (L19), a destroyer of the Royal Navy
- INS Mahish (L19), a landing ship of the Indian Navy
- Soviet submarine L-19, a Leninets-class submarine
- Zeppelin L.19 (LZ 54), an airship of the Imperial German Navy
- L-19, a United States Navy L-class blimp

== Proteins ==
- 60S ribosomal protein L19
- Mitochondrial ribosomal protein L19
- Ribosomal protein L19 leader

== Other uses ==
- Lectionary 19, a 13th-century, Greek manuscript of the New Testament
- Wasco Airport, in Kern County, California
