= KASD =

KASD may refer to:

- Slidell Airport, Louisiana, USA (ICAO code KASD)
- KASD (FM), a radio station (90.3 FM) licensed to serve Rapid City, South Dakota, United States
