= KGNI =

KGNI may refer to:

- KGNI (FM), a radio station (88.7 FM) licensed to Gunnison, Colorado, United States
- Grand Isle Seaplane Base (ICAO code KGNI)
