= BQP (disambiguation) =

BQP is a computational complexity class that represents problems that are easy to solve for quantum computers.

BQP or bqp can also refer to:

- Busa language (Mande), a language spoken in Nigeria and Benin, by ISO 639 code
- Great Order Party, a liberal political party of Azerbaijan
- Morehouse Memorial Airport, an airport in Bastrop, Louisiana, U.S., by IATA code
- Ministry of Defence (Vietnam), a government agency of Vietnam responsible for military issues
- Bighapur railway station, a train station in India; see List of railway stations in India#B
- $BQP$, a mathematical object that can be used to define algebraic K-theory
