= KACP =

KACP may refer to:

- KACP (FM), a radio station (103.1 FM) licensed to serve Pahrump, Nevada, United States
- KNRS (AM), a radio station (570 AM) licensed to serve Salt Lake City, Utah, United States, which held the call sign KACP from 2009 to 2010
- Allen Parish Airport (ICAO code KACP)
