= F87 =

F87 may refer to:

== Ship pennant numbers ==
- HMS Chatham (F87), a Royal Navy frigate decommissioned in 2011
- HMS Kempenfelt (1915), a Royal Navy flotilla leader whose pennant number was F87 from January to April 1918
- HMS Orpheus (1916), a Royal Navy First World War destroyer whose last pennant number, F87, was assigned in 1919
- HMS Tetrarch (1917), a Royal Navy First World War destroyer originally assigned F87 in 1915
- HMS Venturous (D87), a Royal Navy First World War destroyer assigned F87 in 1918, later changed to D87
- NNS Obuma, a Nigerian Navy frigate

== Transportation ==
- F87, code name for the first-generation BMW M2 automobile
- F87, a unit of the BVG Class F train type
- F87, FAA location ID for Union Parish Airport, Union Parish, Louisiana, United States
- F87, one of the road signs in Belgium

== Other uses ==
- F87, designation of Van Gogh's painting The Old Church Tower at Nuenen in the Snow (1885)
- F87, catalog number of an Antonio Rosetti antiphon (short chant)
- F87, one of the coded postal obliterators used by the British Post Office, specifically for Smyrna, Ottoman Empire
- F87, a discontinued NetApp FAS computer storage model

== See also ==
- Curtiss-Wright XF-87 Blackhawk, a prototype American all-weather jet fighter-interceptor
