= TMCO4 =

Protein found in humans

Identifiers
- Aliases: TMCO4, transmembrane and coiled-coil domains 4
- External IDs: MGI: 1924306; GeneCards: TMCO4

Gene location (Human)
Chr.	Chromosome 1 (human)
Band	1p36.13	Start	19,682,240 bp
Band	1p36.13	End	19,799,945 bp

Gene location (Mouse)
Chr.	Chromosome 4 (mouse)
Band	4|4 D3	Start	138,700,199 bp
Band	4|4 D3	End	138,786,482 bp
RNA expression pattern
Bgee	Human / Mouse (ortholog); Top expressed in: sural nerve; granulocyte; right lobe of thyroid gland; left lobe of thyroid gland; prostate; mucosa of transverse colon; body of pancreas; body of stomach; right adrenal cortex; left adrenal gland / Top expressed in: transitional epithelium of urinary bladder; right kidney; duodenum; muscle of thigh; zygote; blastocyst; secondary oocyte; yolk sac; granulocyte; lip; More reference expression data
BioGPS	n/a
Orthologs
Databases	NCBI: entry; OMA: entry
Species	Human	Mouse
Entrez	255104	77056
Ensembl	ENSG00000162542	ENSMUSG00000041143
UniProt	Q5TGY1	Q91WU4
RefSeq (mRNA)	NM_181719; NM_001349112; NM_001349113; NM_001349114; NM_001349115	NM_029857; NM_001305423
RefSeq (protein)	NP_859070; NP_001336041; NP_001336042; NP_001336043; NP_001336044	NP_001292352; NP_084133
Location (UCSC)	Chr 1: 19.68 – 19.8 Mb	Chr 4: 138.7 – 138.79 Mb
PubMed search
- Wikidata
View/Edit Human	View/Edit Mouse

Transmembrane and coiled-coil domains 4, TMCO4, is a protein in humans that is encoded by the TMCO4 gene. Currently, its function is not well defined. It is transmembrane protein that is predicted to cross the endoplasmic reticulum membrane three times. TMCO4 interacts with other proteins known to play a role in cancer development, hinting at a possible role in the disease of cancer.

== Gene ==
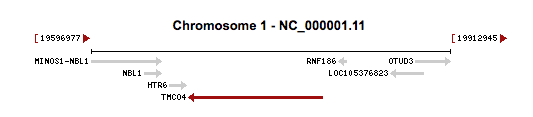
Location of TMCO4 on chromosome 1

TMCO4 is located on the minus strand of the first chromosome at 1p36.13. The gene consists of 118,172 base pairs stretching from base pair 19,682,213 through 19,800,385. There are no common aliases for TMCO4. Genes CAPZB and LOC105376823 neighbor TMCO4 on chromosome 1. TMCO4 consists of 16 exons.

== mRNA ==
There are twenty mRNA transcript variants (X1-X20) produced through different combinations of sixteen different exons. The most common variant is X1, which includes all exons and spans the entire 118,172 base pairs.

== Protein ==
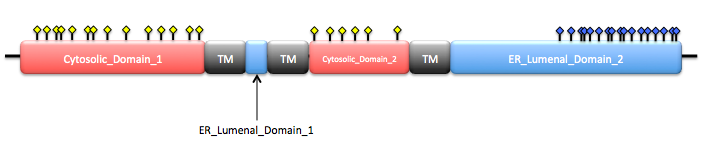
Schematic illustration of TMCO4 protein. Yellow diamonds represent predicted phosphorylation sites and blue diamonds represent predicted O-linked glycosylation sites.

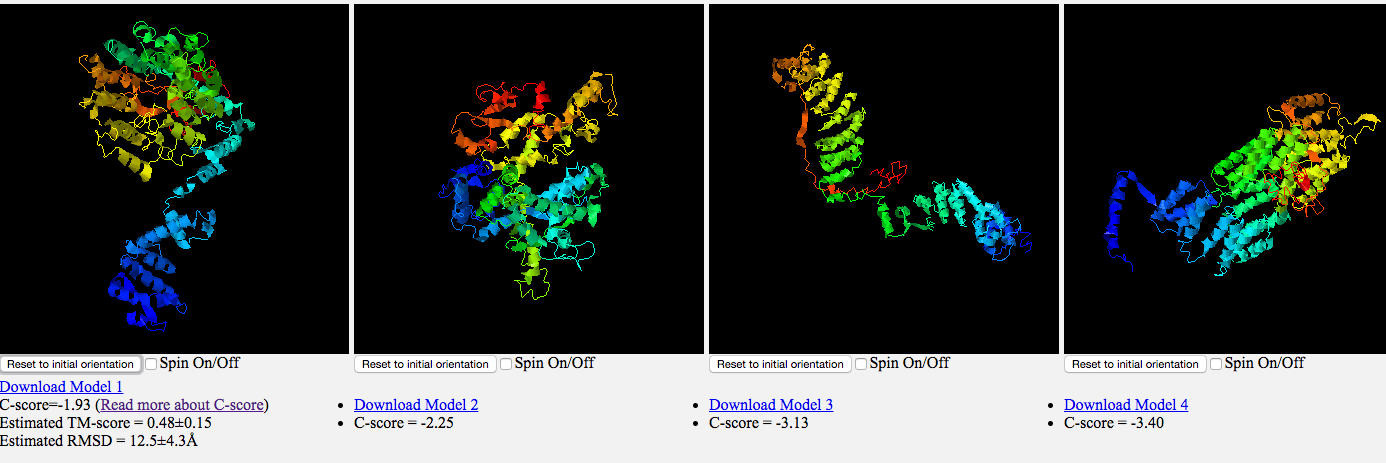
Four possible secondary structure predictions created by iTASSER software. The first predicted structure on the far left is the most stable, and therefore most probable predicted structure.

=== Primary sequence ===
The most common protein encoded by TMCO4 is 634 amino acids in length with accession number XP_011539488.1.

=== General properties and composition ===
The molecular weight of TMCO4 is 67.9 kilodaltons. The isoelectric point is 5.48. As a whole protein, TMCO4 does not have abnormal amino acid distributions. It does have three long stretches of no charge that correspond with the location of the three different transmembrane regions. The first cytosolic domain of TMCO4 does have abnormally high amounts of leucine and glutamic acid and abnormally low amounts of asparagine. The larger lumenal domain of TMCO4 also has an abnormally low amount of asparagine and phenylalanine.

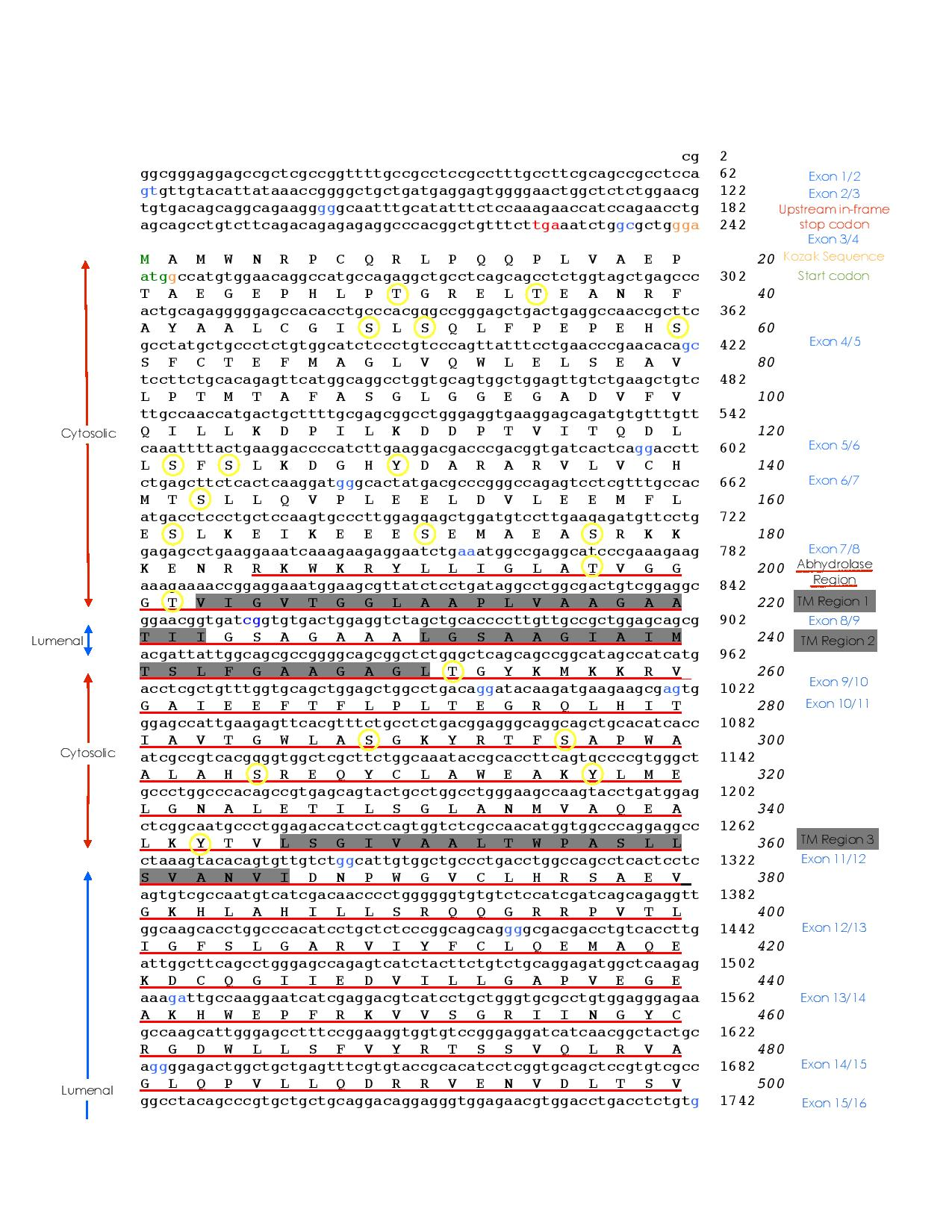
Conceptual translation of TMCO4 page 1. Yellow circles indicate predicted phosphorylation sites and blue circles indicate predicted O-linked glycosylation sites. The highlighting towards the 3' end of the sequence predicts stem loop formations.

=== Protein features ===
Two main areas of interest within the TMCO4 protein are the three transmembrane regions and the large Abhydrolase region. The N-terminus of TMCO4 is predicted to be within the cytosol of the cell, and the C-terminus is predicted to be within the lumen of the endoplasmic retiticulum. TMCO4 is also predicted to have a leucine zipper and a large coiled coil domain.

=== Secondary structure ===
The secondary structure of TMCO4 is predicted to be dominated by alpha helices based on predictions by iTASSER software.

=== Post-translational modifications ===
Many phosphorylation sites were predicted for the two cytosolic regions of TMCO4. O-linked glycosylation sites were predicted to occur in the end of the second lumenal region of TMCO4. These predicted sites can be seen on both the schematic illustration of TMCO4 found above, or in the conceptual translation of TMCO4 found below.

=== Subcellular localization ===
TMCO4 is consistently predicted to be located in the endoplasmic reticulum membrane across many homologs.

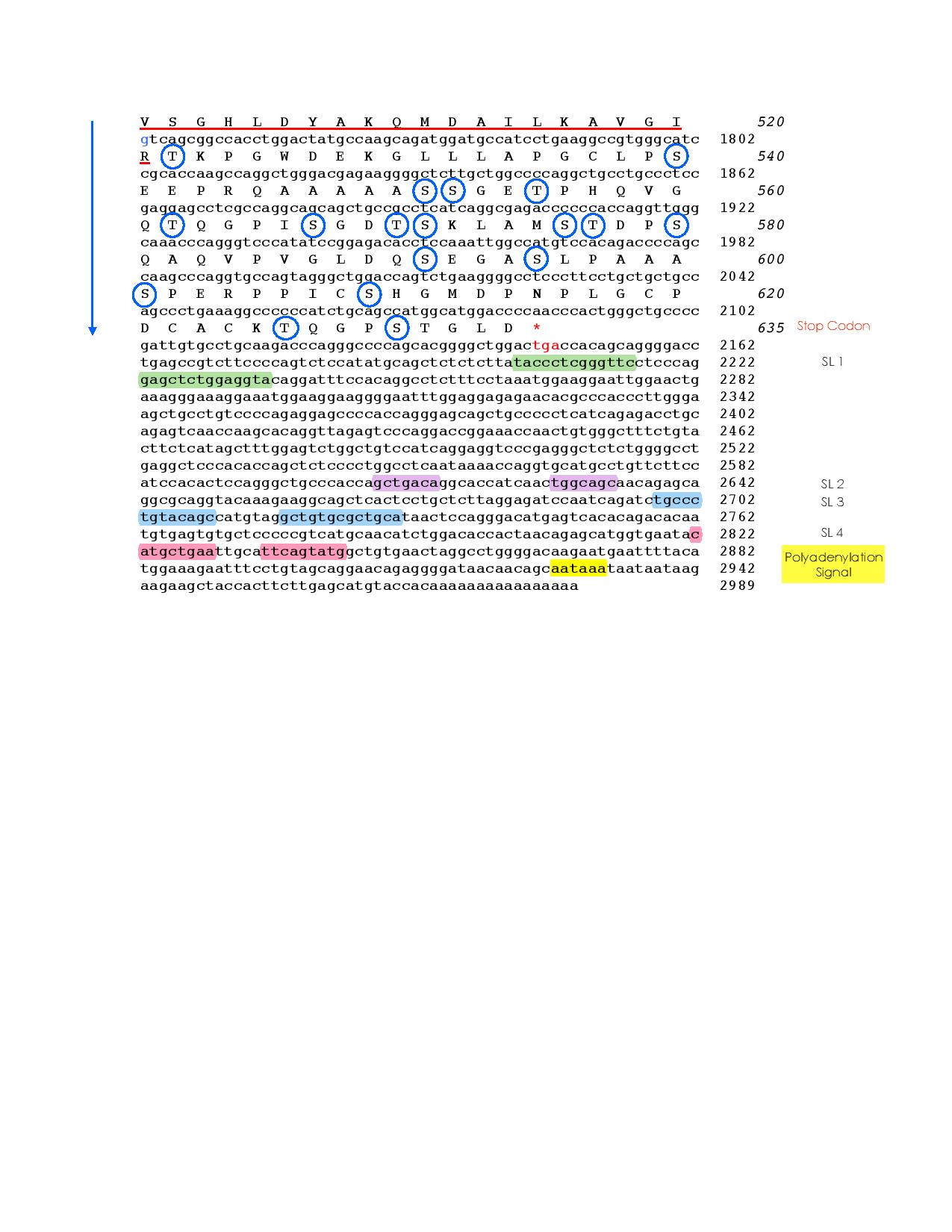
Conceptual translation of TMCO4 page 2

Organism	Common Name	Endoplasmic Reticulum	Golgi	Mitochondrial	Nuclear	Plasma Membrane
Homo sapiens	Human	44.4%	22.2%	22.2%	11.1%	-
Mus musculis	Mouse	39.1%	4.3%	17.4%	8.7%	21.7%
Xenopus laevis	Frog	55.6%	-	22.2%	11.1%	-
Danio rerio	Zebra fish	33.3%	11.1%	11.1%	-	22.2%
Callorhinchus milii	Australian Ghostshark	33.3%	11.1%	33.3%	-	22.2%

=== Interacting proteins ===
TMCO4 has been found to interact with many proteins. One protein of interest that TMCO4 interacts with is FLT1. FLT1 is a VEGF receptor. VEGF is known to play a significant role in cancer development. Other proteins that TMCO4 has been experimentally shown to interact with are UBB, UBC, KPTN, and BVLF1. UBB and UBC are polyubiquitins that target molecules for degradation, suggesting that TMCO4 is degraded at some point. KPTN is a protein that is essential in neuromorphogenesis. BVLF1 is an Epstein–Barr virus protein.

== Homology ==
=== Paralogs ===
TMCO4 does not have any paralogs.

=== Orthologs ===
Orthologs to TMCO4 can be found in bacteria, protists, plants, fungi, trichoplax, invertebrates, fish, amphibians, reptiles, birds and mammals. Some of these orthologs can be found in the table below. The orthologs are sorted in descending order of date of evolution from humans and then descending order of percent sequence identity. TMCO4 is a fast evolving gene that has been highly conserved throughout evolution. Regions of TMCO4 that are highly conserved across the orthologs include the various transmembrane domains and the abhydrolase region.

Genus and species	Accession number	Sequence length	Sequence identity	Sequence similarity
Homo sapiens (Human)	NP_859070.3	634	100%	100%
Papio anubus (Baboon)	XP_017813266.1	568	96%	97%
Mus musculus (Mouse)	AAH13471.1	631	83%	88%
Ursus maritimus (Polar Bear)	XP_008692882.1	608	87%	90%
Gavia stellata (Red-throated loon)	XP_009808720.1	610	78%	87%
Python bivittatus (Burmese python)	XP_007441490.1	617	70%	83%
Xenopus laevis (Frog)	XP_018083828.1	635	75%	87%
Danio rerio (Zebra fish)	XP_003201275.2	688	59%	74%
Parasteatoda tepidariorum (Spider)	XP_015925328.1	642	56%	74%
Caenorhabditis elegans	NP_494812.2	617	42%	59%
Trichoplax adhaerens	XP_002107886.1	378	52%	70%
Aspergillus clavatus	XP_001275560.1	686	40%	58%
Vibrio parahaemolyticus	WP_069539226.1	412	28%	48%

== Expression ==
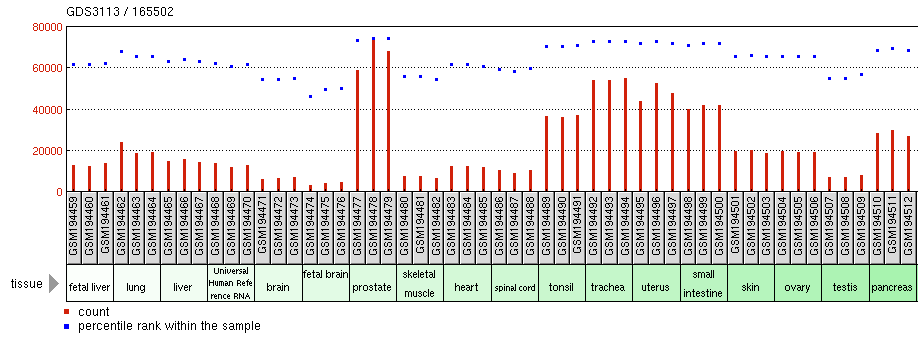
Expression level of TMCO4 in various tissues page 1

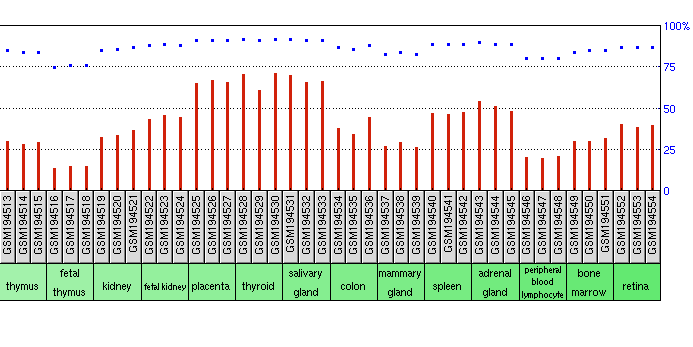
Expression level of TMCO4 in various tissues page 2

TMCO4 is highly expressed in many tissues. Highest expression occurs within the prostate, trachea, uterus, small intestine, placenta, thyroid, salivary gland, and adrenal gland. Expression of TMCO4 is predicted to be controlled by many transcription factors.

== Clinical Significance ==
TMCO4 is not currently directly linked to any disease or phenotype. However, interacting with a VEGF receptor may be indicative of a possible role in cancer.
