= Columbia Airport =

Columbia Airport may refer to:

- Columbia Airport (California) in Columbia, California, United States (FAA: O22)
- Columbia Airport (Louisiana) in Columbia, Louisiana, United States (FAA: F86)
- Columbia Airport (Ohio) in Columbia Township, Lorain County, Ohio, United States (FAA: 4G8)
- Columbia County Airport in Columbia County, New York State, United States (FAA: 1B1)
- Columbia Metropolitan Airport in Columbia, South Carolina, United States (FAA: CAE)
- Columbia Owens Downtown Airport in Columbia, South Carolina, United States (FAA: CUB)
- Columbia Regional Airport near Columbia, Missouri, United States (IATA: COU)
- Columbia Field, a former airport in Valley Stream, New York originally known as Advance Sunrise Airport / Curtiss Airfield.

== See also ==
- Columbiana County Airport in East Liverpool, Ohio, United States (FAA: 02G)
- List of airports in Colombia (South America)
- List of airports in British Columbia (Canada)
