= EL15 ribosomal protein leader =

Ribosomal eL15 leader
- Predicted secondary structure and sequence conservation of eL15_leader. This picture was adapted from a previous publication.

Identifiers
- Symbol: eL15

Other data
- RNA type: Cis-reg; leader
- Domain(s): Archaea
- PDB structures: PDBe

An eL15 ribosomal protein leader is a ribosomal protein leader involved in ribosome biogenesis. It is used as an autoregulatory mechanism to control the concentration of the ribosomal protein eL15, which is used in archaea and eukaryotes. Known Examples were predicted in Euryarchaeota with bioinformatic approaches. The structure is located in the 5′ untranslated regions of mRNAs encoding ribosomal proteins eL15 (rpl15e). Similarities between the eL15 ribosomal protein and the rRNA site to which this protein binds were detected.
