= S10 ribosomal protein leader =

Ribosomal S10 leader
- Predicted secondary structure and sequence conservation of S10_leader. This picture was adapted from a previous publication.

Identifiers
- Symbol: S10

Other data
- RNA type: Cis-reg; leader
- Domain(s): Bacteria
- PDB structures: PDBe

S10 ribosomal protein leader is a ribosomal protein leader involved in the ribosome biogenesis. It is used as an autoregulatory mechanism to control the concentration of the ribosomal protein S10. Known Examples were predicted in Clostridia or other lineages of Bacillota with bioinformatic approaches. The structure is located in the 5′ untranslated regions of mRNAs encoding ribosomal proteins S10 (rpsJ), L3 (rplc) and L4 (rplD). There is an uncertainty about the ligand, because of a lack of experimental investigation.

== See also ==
- Ribosomal protein leader
