= L17 =

L17 or L-17 may refer to:

== Vehicles ==
- HDMS Esbern Snare (L17), a support ship of the Royal Danish Navy
- HMS L17, a submarine of the Royal Navy
- INS Sharabh (L17), a tank landing ship of the Indian Navy
- Lichi L17, a Chinese microcar
- Ryan L-17 Navion, an American light aircraft
- Soviet submarine L-17, a Leninets-class submarine
- Zeppelin LZ 53 (military designation L 17), an Imperial German Navy airship of World War I
- L-17, a United States Navy L-class blimp

== Proteins ==
- 60S ribosomal protein L17
- L17 ribosomal protein leader
- Mitochondrial ribosomal protein L17

== Other uses ==
- Lectionary 17, a Greek manuscript of the New Testament, dating between the 9th and the 12th century
- Taft Airport, in Kern County, California
