= L4 ribosomal protein leader =

Ribosomal L4 leader
- Predicted secondary structure and sequence conservation of L4_leader. This picture was adapted from a previous publication.

Identifiers
- Symbol: L4

Other data
- RNA type: Cis-reg; leader
- Domain(s): Archaea
- PDB structures: PDBe

An L4 ribosomal protein leader is a ribosomal protein leader involved in ribosome biogenesis. It is used as an autoregulatory mechanism to control the concentration of the ribosomal protein L4. Known Examples were predicted in Archaeoglobi with bioinformatic approaches. The structure is located in the 5′ untranslated regions of mRNAs encoding ribosomal proteins L3 (rplC), L4 (rplD), L23 (rplW) and L2 (rplB).
