= PTN =

PTN may refer to:

- Perguruan tinggi negeri, the Indonesian word for "public university"
- Harry P. Williams Memorial Airport (IATA/FAA code PTN), Louisiana, U.S.
- Paramount Television Network (1948–1956), U.S.
- Partido Trabalhista Nacional (National Labour Party), a Brazilian party
- Partido Trabalhista Nacional (National Labor Party), former name of Podemos, a Brazilian party
- Pinguini Tattici Nucleari, an Italian indie band
- Pleiotrophin, a protein
