= S4 ribosomal protein leader =

Ribosomal S4 leader
- Predicted secondary structure and sequence conservation of S4_leader. This picture was adapted from a previous publication.

Identifiers
- Symbol: S4

Other data
- RNA type: Cis-reg; leader
- Domain(s): Bacteria
- PDB structures: PDBe

The S4 ribosomal protein leader is a ribosomal protein leader involved in ribosome biogenesis. It is used as an autoregulatory mechanism to control the concentration of the ribosomal protein S4. Two examples of such leaders that use different conserved structures, in Bacillota and Gammaproteobacteria, have been experimentally confirmed. Four additional S4 ribosomal protein leaders, each with distinct structures, were predicted in various bacteria phyla. In Bacteroidia or Bacillota, the structure is located in the 5′ untranslated regions of mRNAs encoding ribosomal proteins S4 (rpsD), RNA polymerase alpha subunit (rpoA) and L17 (rplQ). In Clostridia (whose S4 ribosomal protein leader differs from that of other Bacillota) and Gammaproteobacteria, the ribosomal proteins S13 (rpsM) and S11 (rpsK) were also part of the mRNA encoding region.

== See also ==
- Ribosomal protein leader
