= RRP15 =

Protein-coding gene in humans

Identifiers
- Aliases: RRP15, KIAA0507, CGI-115, ribosomal RNA processing 15 homolog
- External IDs: OMIM: 611193; MGI: 1914473; GeneCards: RRP15

Gene location (Human)
Chr.	Chromosome 1 (human)
Band	1q41	Start	218,285,293 bp
Band	1q41	End	218,337,983 bp

Gene location (Mouse)
Chr.	Chromosome 1 (mouse)
Band	1|1 H5	Start	186,453,175 bp
Band	1|1 H5	End	186,481,555 bp
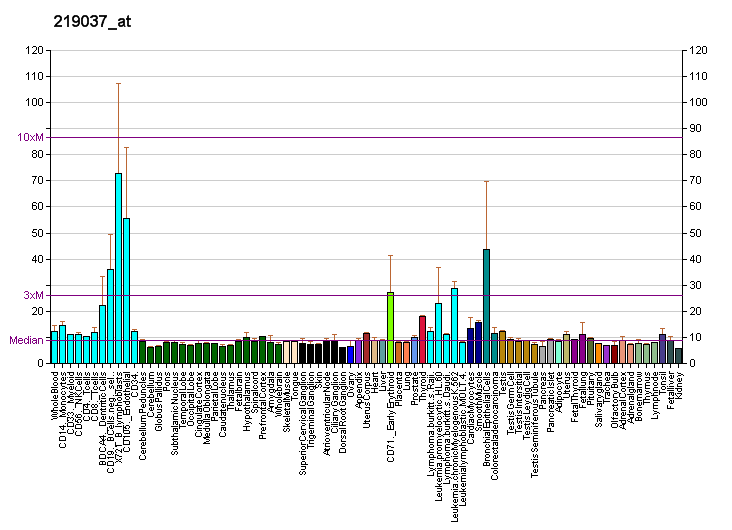

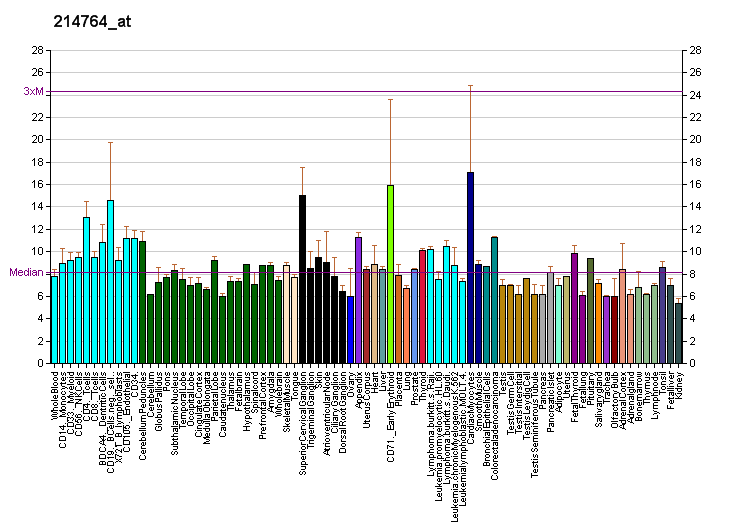
RNA expression pattern
Bgee	Human / Mouse (ortholog); Top expressed in: secondary oocyte; Achilles tendon; cartilage tissue; testicle; germinal epithelium; gastrocnemius muscle; right ventricle; palpebral conjunctiva; gonad; biceps brachii / Top expressed in: primitive streak; epiblast; embryo; embryo; abdominal wall; somite; morula; endothelial cell of lymphatic vessel; Gonadal ridge; hair follicle; More reference expression data
BioGPS	More reference expression data
Orthologs
Databases	NCBI: entry; OMA: entry
Species	Human	Mouse
Entrez	51018	67223
Ensembl	ENSG00000067533	ENSMUSG00000001305
UniProt	Q9Y3B9	Q9CYX7
RefSeq (mRNA)	NM_016052	NM_026041
RefSeq (protein)	NP_057136	NP_080317
Location (UCSC)	Chr 1: 218.29 – 218.34 Mb	Chr 1: 186.45 – 186.48 Mb
PubMed search
- Wikidata
View/Edit Human	View/Edit Mouse

RRP15-like protein is a protein that in humans is encoded by the RRP15 gene.

This gene encodes a protein that co-purifies with human nucleoli. A similar protein in budding yeast is a component of pre-60S ribosomal particles, and is required for the early maturation steps of the 60S subunit.
