= S6:S18 ribosomal protein leader =

Ribosomale protein leader

Ribosomal S6:S18 leader
- Predicted secondary structure and sequence conservation of S6:S18_leader. This picture was adapted from a previous publication.

Identifiers
- Symbol: S6:S18

Other data
- RNA type: Cis-reg; leader
- Domain(s): Bacteria
- PDB structures: PDBe

S6:S18 ribosomal protein leader is a ribosomal protein leader involved in the ribosome biogenesis. It is used as an autoregulatory mechanism to control the concentration of the ribosomal proteins S6:S18 complex. An experimentally confirmed example of such a leader occurs in a wide variety of bacteria, though not all phyla. A S6:S18 ribosomal leader was predicted in Chlorobia, and its predicted structure differs from that of the validated S6:S18 ribosomal leader. This structure is located in the 5′ untranslated regions of mRNAs encoding ribosomal proteins rpsF (S6), the Single-strand DNA-binding protein A (ssbA), S18 (rpsR) and L7/L12 (rpll).

== See also ==
- Ribosomal protein leader
