= L2 ribosomal protein leader =

Ribosomal L2 leader
- Predicted secondary structure and sequence conservation of L2_leader. This picture was adapted from a previous publication.

Identifiers
- Symbol: L2

Other data
- RNA type: Cis-reg; leader
- Domain(s): Bacteria
- PDB structures: PDBe

The L2 ribosomal protein leader is a ribosomal protein leader involved in ribosome biogenesis. It is used as an autoregulatory mechanism to control the concentration of the ribosomal protein L2. Known Examples were predicted in Alphaproteobacteria with bioinformatic approaches. The structure is located in the 5′ untranslated regions of mRNAs encoding ribosomal proteins L2 (rplB), S30 (rpsS), L22 (rplV) and S3 (rpsC). It was proposed that the ligand is uncertain, because none of the downstream (regulated) genes are known as a previously established ribosomal protein leader ligand.

== See also ==
- Ribosomal protein leader
