= S16 ribosomal protein leader =

Ribosomal S16 leader
- Predicted secondary structure and sequence conservation of S16_leader. This picture was adapted from a previous publication.

Identifiers
- Symbol: S16

Other data
- RNA type: Cis-reg; leader
- Domain(s): Bacteria
- PDB structures: PDBe

A S16 ribosomal protein leader is a ribosomal protein leader involved in ribosome biogenesis. It is used as an autoregulatory mechanism to control the concentration of the ribosomal protein S16. Known Examples were predicted in Flavobacteria with bioinformatic approaches. The structure is located in the 5′ untranslated regions of mRNAs encoding ribosomal proteins L16 (rpsP) and the ribosome maturation factor protein (rimM).
