= Ribosomal S15 leader =

Part of ribosome biogenesis

- Predicted secondary structure and sequence conservation of S15

Identifiers
- Symbol: S15
- Rfam: RF00114

Other data
- RNA type: Cis-reg; leader
- Domain(s): Bacteria
- SO: SO:0005836
- PDB structures: PDBe

S15 Ribosomal protein leaders perform an important regulatory function in ribosome biogenesis. They were used as an autoregulatory mechanism to control the concentration of ribosomal proteins S15. The structure is located in the 5′ untranslated regions of mRNAs encoding ribosomal proteins S15 (rpsO). Multiple distinct structural types of S15 ribosomal protein leaders are known in different organisms.

The E. coli ribosomal S15 leader is an RNA element that can form two alternative structures found in the ribosomal S15 protein. One of the two alternate structures is a series of three hairpins, the other includes a pseudoknot. This structure causes translational regulation of the S15 protein. Only the final two hairpins are conserved in other species.

Another example for Bacteria was predicted in Flavobacteria. The secondary structure of his putative ribosomal leader consists of a hairpin in most species. However, some species lack this hairpin. Such a lack of apparent secondary structure would be unusual for a ribosomal leader, which makes this candidate ribosomal leader a less certain prediction.

Two examples in Archaea (one in Halobacteria and one in Methanomicrobia) were predicted. In this structure, similarities between the rRNA binding site of the S15 ribosomal protein and the S15 ribosomal protein leader binding site were detected. This suggests that the ribosomal leaders in these organisms function by mimicking the S15 binding site in rRNA.

Predicted secondary structure and sequence conservation of S15 ribosomal protein leader in Archaea. This picture was adapted from a previous publication.

== See also ==
- Ribosomal protein leader
