= False River Regional Airport =

- IATA: none; ICAO: KHZR; FAA LID: HZR

Summary
- Airport type: Public
- Owner: New Roads & Pointe Coupee Parish
- Serves: New Roads, Louisiana
- Elevation AMSL: 40 ft (12 m)
- Coordinates: 30°43′06″N 091°28′43″W
- Website: FalseRiverRegionalAirport.com
- Interactive map of False River Regional Airport

Runways
Direction	Length		Surface
Direction	ft	m	Surface
18/36	5,003	1,525	Asphalt

Statistics (2009)
- Aircraft operations: 50,125
- Based aircraft: 26
- Source: Federal Aviation Administration

False River Regional Airport (ICAO: KHZR, FAA LID: HZR) is a public use airport located two nautical miles (3.7 km) northwest of the central business district of New Roads, a city in Pointe Coupee Parish, Louisiana, United States. The airport is owned by New Roads and Pointe Coupee Parish. According to the FAA's National Plan of Integrated Airport Systems for 2009–2013, it was classified as a general aviation airport.

== Facilities and aircraft ==
False River Regional Airport covers an area of 103 acres (42 ha) at an elevation of 40 feet (12 m) above mean sea level. It has one runway designated 18/36 with an asphalt surface measuring 5,003 by 75 feet (1,525 x 23 m).

The airport has a terminal building, three corporate hangars, six T-hangars, and two privately owned hangars. An additional seven T-hangars are under construction. The services and facilities include: flight training, airport management, aircraft parking (ramp/tie down), flight planning, computerized weather, a pilots lounge, restrooms, ground transportation, and rental cars.

For the 12-month period ending January 28, 2009, the airport had 50,125 aircraft operations, an average of 137 per day: 99.8% general aviation and 0.2% military. At that time there were 26 aircraft based at this airport: 81% single-engine, 8% multi-engine, 8% helicopter and 4% glider.

== See also ==
- List of airports in Louisiana
