= Ruston Regional Airport =

- IATA: RSN; ICAO: KRSN; FAA LID: RSN

Summary
- Airport type: Public
- Owner: City of Ruston
- Serves: Ruston, Louisiana
- Elevation AMSL: 317 ft / 97 m
- Coordinates: 32°30′53″N 092°35′18″W
- Interactive map of Ruston Regional Airport

Runways
Direction	Length		Surface
Direction	ft	m	Surface
18/36	6,000	1,829	Asphalt

Statistics (2009)
- Aircraft operations: 86,000
- Based aircraft: 32
- Source: Federal Aviation Administration

Ruston Regional Airport (IATA: RSN, ICAO: KRSN, FAA LID: RSN) is a public use airport in Lincoln Parish, Louisiana, United States. It is owned by the City of Ruston and is located three nautical miles (6 km) east of its central business district.

Opening in 1995, the facility also serves the Louisiana Tech University's Department of Professional Aviation. The university maintains a fleet of Cessna and Piper airplanes which account for most of the airport's daily traffic.

== Facilities and aircraft ==
Ruston Regional Airport covers an area of 238 acres (96 ha) at an elevation of 317 feet (97 m) above mean sea level. It has one runway designated 18/36 with an asphalt surface measuring 6,000 by 100 feet (1,829 x 30 m).

For the 12-month period ending April 17, 2009, the airport had 86,000 general aviation aircraft operations, an average of 235 per day. At that time there were 32 aircraft based at this airport: 81% single-engine, 6% multi-engine, 9% jet and 3% helicopter.

Since 2024, several projects aiming to expand the airport have taken place. These include the construction of an approach lighting system and expanding the apron and hangar space.

== See also ==
- List of airports in Louisiana
