= St. Charles Airport (Louisiana) =

- IATA: none; ICAO: none; FAA LID: LS40

Summary
- Airport type: Private
- Owner: St. Charles Land Corp
- Serves: Ama, Louisiana
- Elevation AMSL: 13 ft (4.0 m)
- Coordinates: 29°57′12″N 90°17′17″W

Map
- Location of airport in Louisiana LS40 (the United States)

Runways
Direction	Length		Surface
Direction	ft	m	Surface
17/35	3,900	1,189	Turf

Statistics
- Aircraft operations: 900
- Based aircraft: 32
- Source: Federal Aviation Administration.

St. Charles Airport (FAA LID: LS40) is a privately owned airport in St. Charles Parish, Louisiana, United States. It is located one nautical mile (1.60934 km) southeast of Ama, Louisiana.

== Facilities and aircraft ==
St. Charles Airport covers an area of 22 acres (8 ha) at an elevation of 13 feet (4 m) above mean sea level. It has one runway designated 17/35 with a turf surface measuring 3,900 by 125 feet (1189 x 38 m).

For the 12-month period ending June 25, 2015, the airport had 900 aircraft operations, an average of 75 per month: 100% general aviation. At that time there were 32 aircraft based at this airport: 94% single-engine, 3% multi-engine, and 3% ultralight.

=== Gallery ===
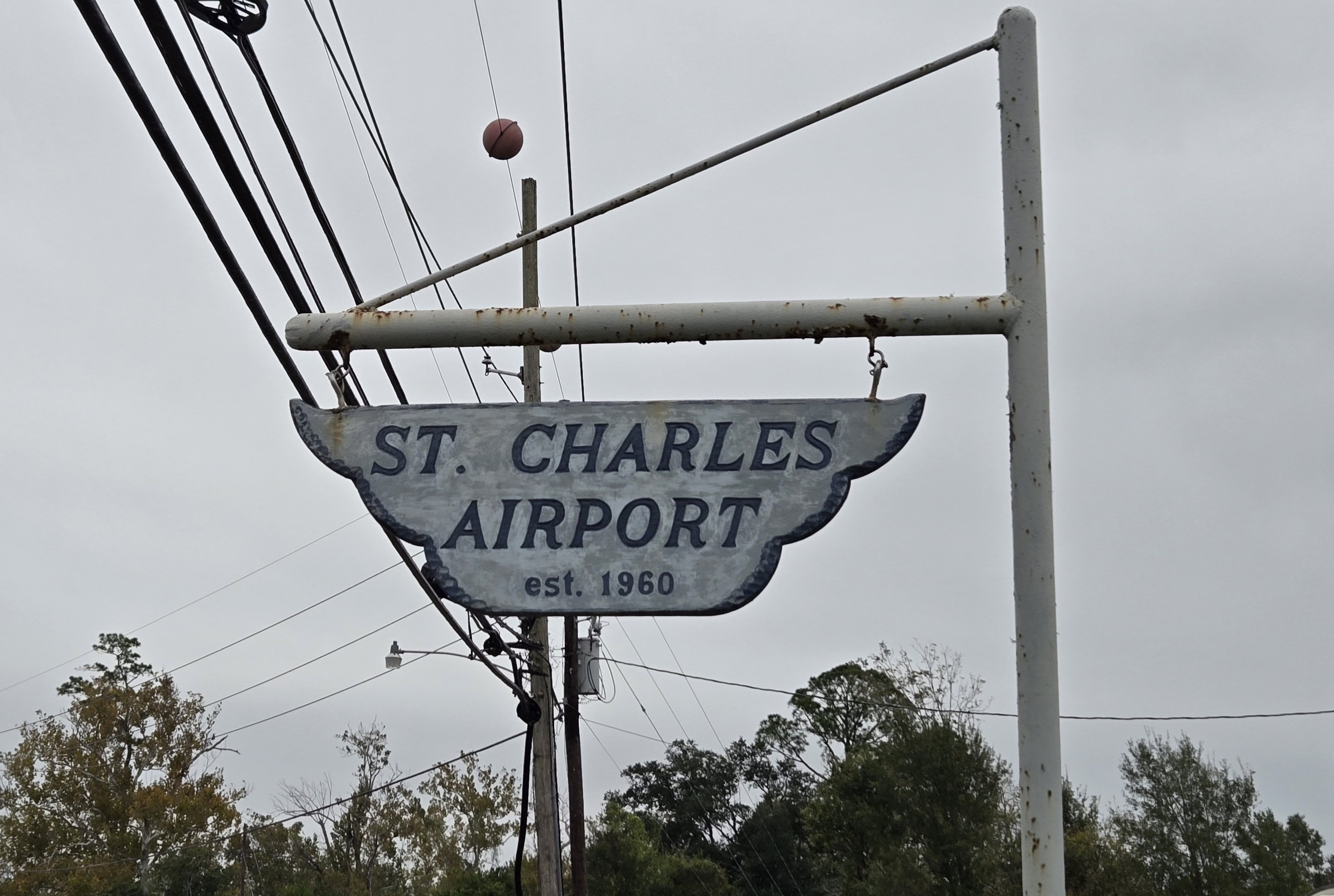
St. Charles Airport Sign

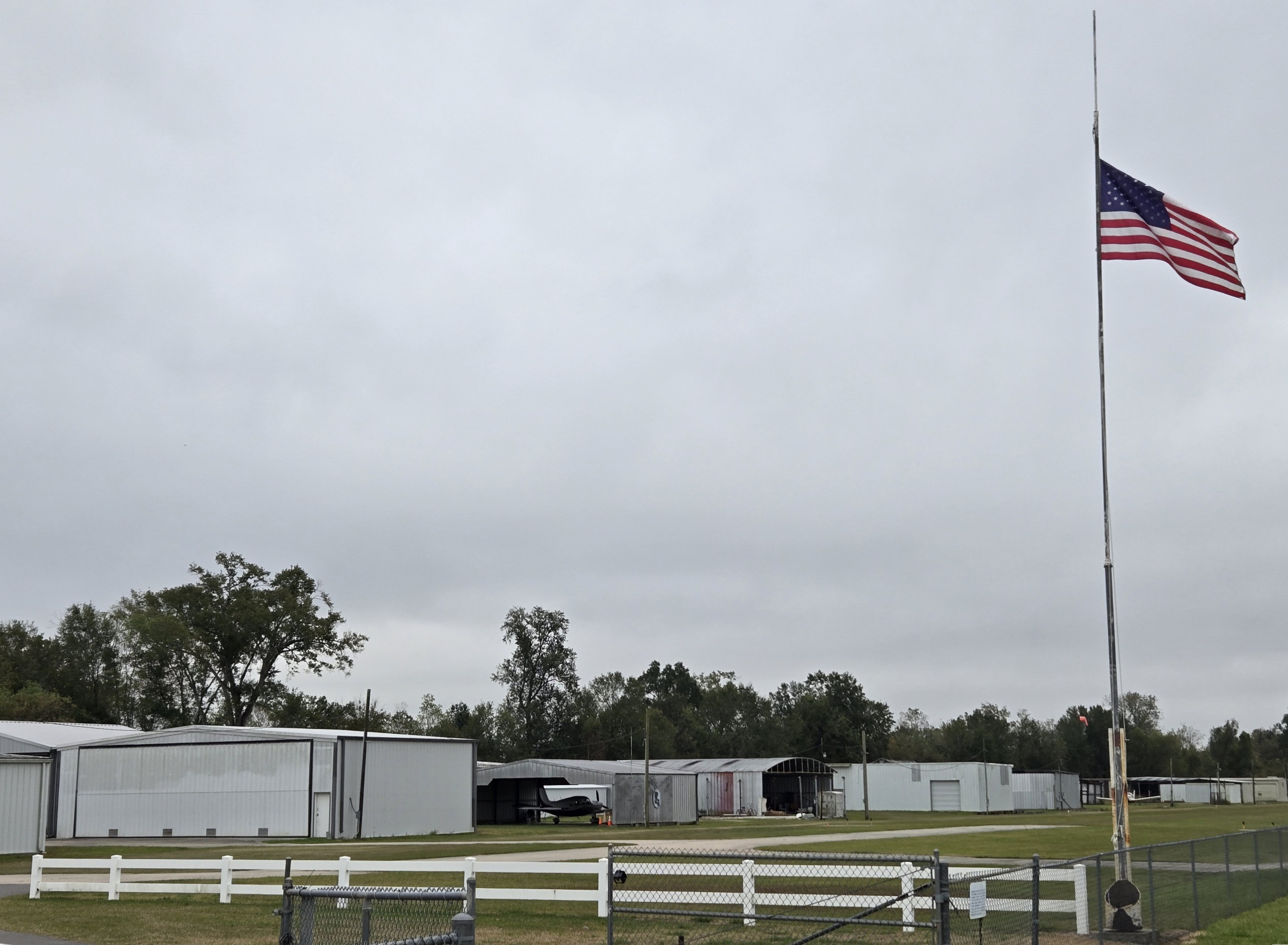
St. Charles Airport Hangars

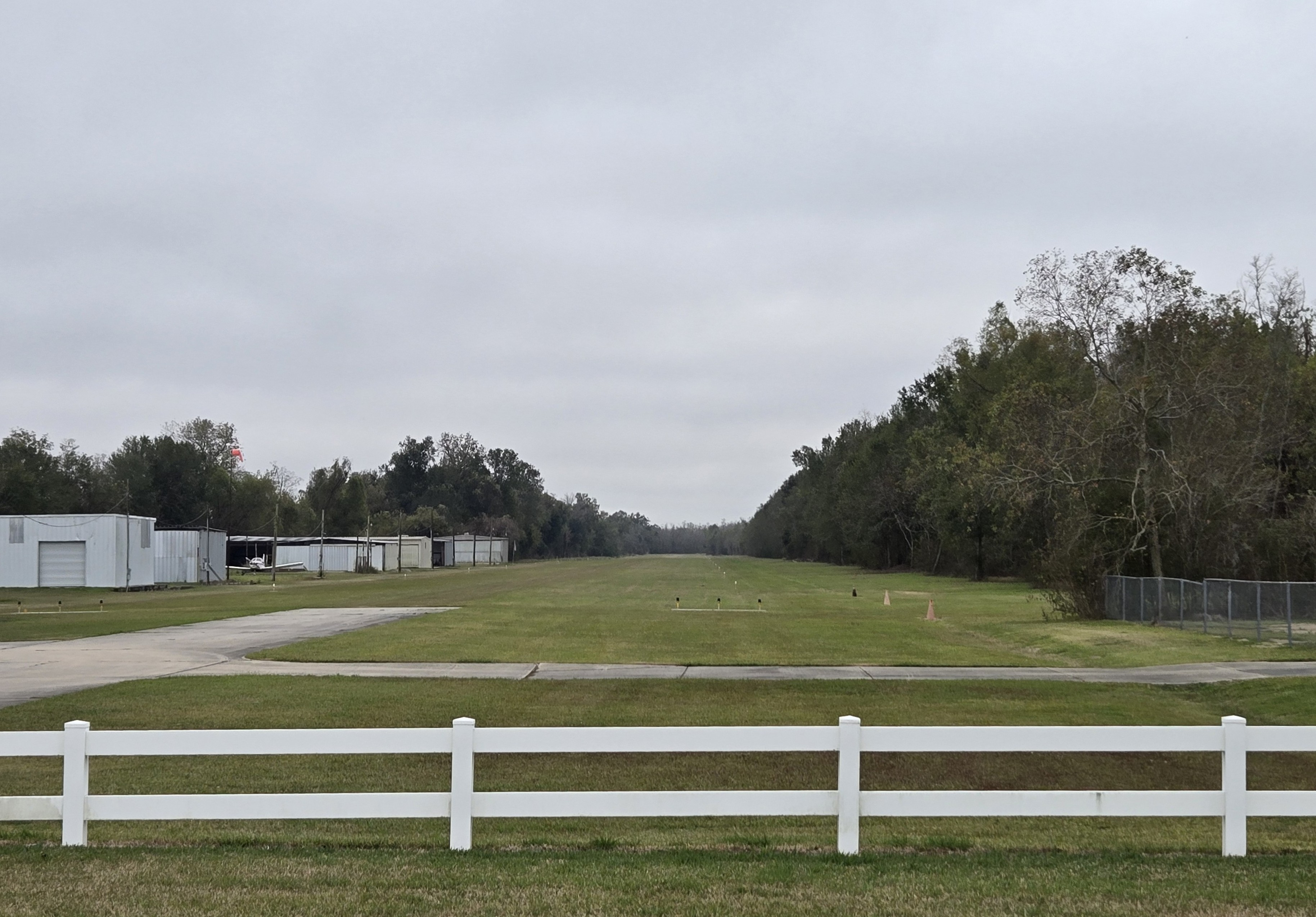
St. Charles Airport Runway and Hangars

== See also ==
- List of airports in Louisiana
