= St. Tammany Regional Airport =

- IATA: none; ICAO: none; FAA LID: L31

Summary
- Airport type: Public
- Owner: St. Tammany Parish
- Location: Covington, Louisiana
- Elevation AMSL: 39 ft / 12 m
- Coordinates: 30°26′42″N 089°59′20″W
- Interactive map of St. Tammany Regional Airport

Runways
Direction	Length		Surface
Direction	ft	m	Surface
18/36	2,999	914	Asphalt

Statistics (2009)
- Aircraft operations: 25,600
- Based aircraft: 18
- Source: Federal Aviation Administration

St. Tammany Regional Airport (FAA LID: L31) is a public use airport in St. Tammany Parish, Louisiana, United States. It is owned by St. Tammany Parish and located six nautical miles (11 km) southeast of the central business district of Covington, Louisiana. The nearest town is Abita Springs.

== Facilities and aircraft ==
St. Tammany Regional Airport covers an area of 42 acres (17 ha) at an elevation of 39 feet (12 m) above mean sea level. It has one runway designated 18/36 with an asphalt surface measuring 2,999 by 75 feet (914 x 23 m).

For the 12-month period ending April 15, 2009, the airport had 25,600 aircraft operations, an average of 70 per day: 98% general aviation and 2% air taxi and <1% military. At that time there were 18 aircraft based at this airport: 13 single-engine, 3 multi-engine, 1 helicopter and 1 ultralight.

== See also ==
- List of airports in Louisiana
- Slidell Airport, also located in St. Tammany Parish, owned by the City of Slidell (30°20′47″N 089°49′15″W)
