= Shreveport Downtown Airport =

Airport in Shreveport, Louisiana

- IATA: DTN; ICAO: KDTN; FAA LID: DTN

Summary
- Airport type: Public
- Owner: Shreveport Airport Authority
- Serves: Shreveport, Louisiana
- Elevation AMSL: 179 ft (55 m)
- Coordinates: 32°32′25″N 093°44′42″W
- Website: http://www.flyshreveport.com/138/Shreveport-Downtown-Airport
- Interactive map of Shreveport Downtown Airport

Runways
Direction	Length		Surface
Direction	ft	m	Surface
14/32	5,016	1,529	Asphalt
5/23	4,198	1,280	Asphalt

Statistics (2023)
- Aircraft operations (year ending 11/15/2023): 37,590
- Based aircraft: 175
- Source: Federal Aviation Administration

Shreveport Downtown Airport (IATA: DTN, ICAO: KDTN, FAA LID: DTN) is a public use airport located in the Bossier Parish portion of Shreveport, Louisiana, United States. It is closer to downtown Shreveport than the larger Shreveport Regional Airport. It is owned by the Shreveport Airport Authority.

== Facilities and aircraft ==
Shreveport Downtown Airport covers an area of 600 acres (240 ha) at an elevation of 179 feet (55 m) above mean sea level. It has two asphalt paved runways: 14/32 is 5,016 by 150 feet (1,529 x 46 m) and 5/23 is 4,198 by 75 feet (1,280 x 23 m).

For the 12-month period ending November 15, 2023, the airport had 37,590 aircraft operations, an average of 103 per day: 98% general aviation, 1% air taxi and <1% military. At that time there were 175 aircraft based at this airport: 143 single-engine, 24 multi-engine, 6 jet and 2 glider.

== See also ==
- List of airports in Louisiana
