= Thackers Airport =

- IATA: none; ICAO: none; FAA LID: 5F8

Summary
- Airport type: Public
- Owner: Louis Thacker
- Serves: Oil City, Louisiana
- Elevation AMSL: 202 ft / 62 m
- Coordinates: 32°47′29″N 093°57′24″W

Map
- Location of airport in Louisiana 5F8 (the United States)

Runways
Direction	Length		Surface
Direction	ft	m	Surface
8/26	2,900	884	Turf

Statistics (2011)
- Aircraft operations: 650
- Based aircraft: 2
- Source: Federal Aviation Administration

Thackers Airport (FAA LID: 5F8) is a privately owned, public use airport in Caddo Parish, Louisiana, United States. It is located three nautical miles (6 km) north of the central business district of Oil City.

== Facilities and aircraft ==
Thackers Airport covers an area of 15 acres (6 ha) at an elevation of 202 feet (62 m) above mean sea level. It has one runway designated 8/26 with a turf surface measuring 2,900 by 50 feet (884 x 15 m).

For the 12-month period ending April 26, 2011, the airport had 650 general aviation aircraft operations, an average of 54 per month. At that time there were two single-engine aircraft based at this airport.

== See also ==
- List of airports in Louisiana
