= Southern Seaplane Airport =

- IATA: BCS; ICAO: none; FAA LID: 65LA

Summary
- Airport type: Private
- Owner: Southern Seaplane Inc
- Serves: Belle Chasse, Louisiana
- Elevation AMSL: 0 ft / 0 m
- Coordinates: 29°51′58″N 090°01′20″W
- Interactive map of Southern Seaplane Airport

Runways
Direction	Length		Surface
Direction	ft	m	Surface
2/20	3,200	975	Asphalt
2W/20W	5,000	1,524	Water

Statistics
- Based aircraft: 28
- Source: Federal Aviation Administration

Southern Seaplane Airport (IATA: BCS, FAA LID: 65LA) is an airport and seaplane base located two nautical miles (4 km) northwest of the central business district of Belle Chasse, in Plaquemines Parish, Louisiana, United States.

== Facilities and aircraft ==
Southern Seaplane Airport has one runway designated 2/20 with a 3,200 by 40 ft (975 x 12 m) asphalt pavement. It also has one seaplane landing area designated 2W/20W which measures 5,000 by 100 ft (1,524 x 30 m). There are 28 aircraft based at this airport: 89% single-engine and 11% multi-engine.

== See also ==
- List of airports in Louisiana
