= Vivian Airport =

Vivian Airport Vivian Municipal Airport
- IATA: none; ICAO: none; FAA LID: 3F4

Summary
- Airport type: Public
- Owner: Town of Vivian
- Serves: Vivian, Louisiana
- Elevation AMSL: 260 ft / 79 m
- Coordinates: 32°51′41″N 094°00′37″W
- Interactive map of Vivian Airport

Runways
Direction	Length		Surface
Direction	ft	m	Surface
9/27	2,998	914	Asphalt

Statistics (2023)
- Aircraft operations (year ending 11/15/2023): 11,012
- Based aircraft: 11
- Source: Federal Aviation Administration

Vivian Airport (FAA LID: 3F4) is a town-owned public-use airport located two nautical miles (3.7 km) southwest of the central business district of Vivian, a town in Caddo Parish, Louisiana, United States. The airport is 25 miles north of Shreveport, Louisiana and it is also known as Vivian Municipal Airport.

== Facilities and aircraft ==
Vivian Airport covers an area of 120 acres (49 ha) at an elevation of 260 feet (79 m) above mean sea level. It has one asphalt paved runway designated 9/27 which measures 2,998 by 75 feet (914 x 23 m).

For the 12-month period ending November 15, 2023, the airport had 11,012 aircraft operations, an average of 23 per day, 100% general aviation, and <1% military. At that time there were 11 aircraft based at this airport: 10 single-engine, and 1 helicopter.

== See also ==
- List of airports in Louisiana
