= L17 ribosomal protein leader =

Ribosomal L17 leader
- Predicted secondary structure and sequence conservation of L17_leader. This picture was adapted from a previous publication.

Identifiers
- Symbol: L17
- Rfam: RF03132

Other data
- RNA type: Cis-reg; leader
- Domain(s): Bacteria
- PDB structures: PDBe

An L17 ribosomal protein leader is a ribosomal protein leader involved in ribosome biogenesis. It is used as an autoregulatory mechanism to control the concentration of the ribosomal protein L17. Known Examples were predicted in Actinomycetota and Pseudomonadota with bioinformatic approaches. The structure is located in the 5′ untranslated regions of mRNAs encoding ribosomal protein L17 (rplQ).

== See also ==
- Ribosomal protein leader
