= Colfax Airport =

- IATA: none; ICAO: none; FAA LID: L40

Summary
- Airport type: Public
- Owner: Town of Colfax
- Serves: Colfax, Louisiana
- Elevation AMSL: 95 ft (29 m)
- Coordinates: 31°30′58″N 092°41′28″W

Map
- Location of airport in Louisiana

Runways
Direction	Length		Surface
Direction	ft	m	Surface
5/23	3,000	914	Turf

Statistics (2007)
- Aircraft operations: 3,500
- Source: Federal Aviation Administration

Colfax Airport (FAA LID: L40) is a public airport located in Colfax, a town in Grant Parish, Louisiana, United States. It is owned by the Town of Colfax.

== Facilities and aircraft ==
Colfax Airport covers an area of 200 acres (81 ha) which contains one runway designated 5/23 with a turf surface measuring 3,000 by 75 feet (914 x 23 m).

For the 12-month period ending April 3, 2007, the airport had 3,500 aircraft operations, an average of nine per day: 86% general aviation and 14% military.

== See also ==
- List of airports in Louisiana
