= Ribosomal protein L13 leader =

L13_leader
- Consensus secondary structure and sequence conservation of Ribosomal protein L13 leader

Identifiers
- Symbol: L13_leader
- Rfam: RF00555

Other data
- RNA type: Cis-reg; leader
- GO: GO:0010468
- SO: SO:0000233
- PDB structures: PDBe

L13-Bacteroidia
- Consensus secondary structure and sequence conservation of L13-Bacteroidia ribosomal protein leader

Identifiers
- Symbol: L13-Bacteroidia
- Rfam: RF03127

Other data
- RNA type: Cis-reg; leader
- SO: SO:0000837
- PDB structures: PDBe

L13 ribosomal protein leaders play a role in ribosome biogenesis as part of an autoregulatory mechanism to control the concentration of ribosomal proteins L13. Three structural classes of L13 ribosomal protein leaders were detected by different bioinformatics approaches: in B. subtilis and other low-GC Gram-positive bacteria., in E. coli and in Bacteroidia. Although these RNAs are expected to perform the same biological function, they do not appear to be structurally related to one another. The E. coli example has been experimentally confirmed, though the experiments are not comprehensive. The other two leader structures are thus far not based on experimental support.

== See also ==
Ribosomal protein leader
