= Minden Airport =

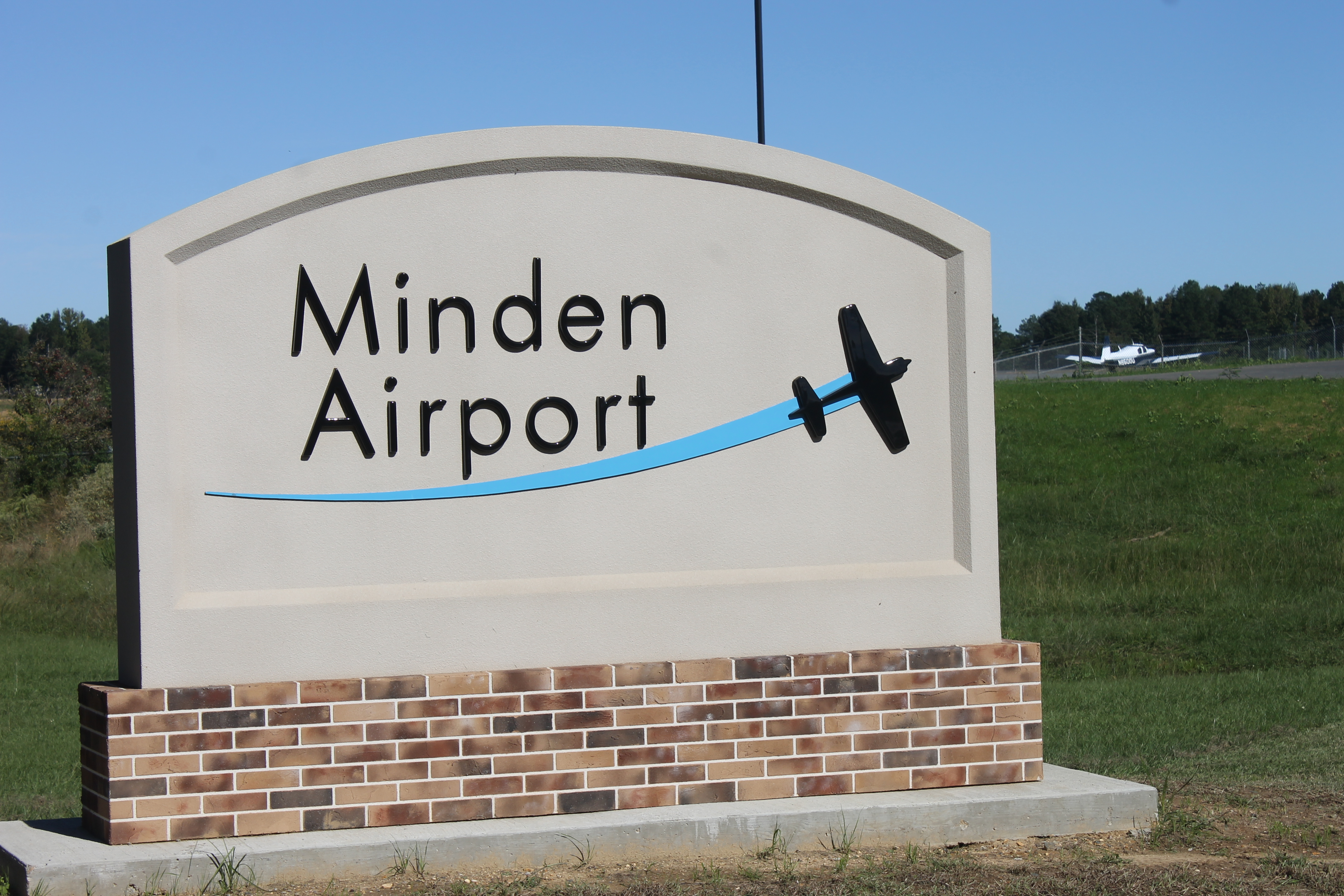
- Minden Airport sign
- IATA: none; ICAO: KMNE; FAA LID: MNE

Summary
- Airport type: Public
- Owner: City of Minden
- Serves: Minden, Louisiana
- Elevation AMSL: 278 ft / 85 m
- Coordinates: 32°38′46″N 093°17′53″W
- Website: MindenAirport.net

Map
- Location of airport in Louisiana MNE (the United States)

Runways
Direction	Length		Surface
Direction	ft	m	Surface
1/19	5,004	1,525	Asphalt

Statistics (2011)
- Aircraft operations: 15,000
- Based aircraft: 18
- Source: Federal Aviation Administration

Minden Airport (ICAO: KMNE, FAA LID: MNE, formerly F24) is a public use airport in Webster Parish, Louisiana, United States. The airport is owned by the City of Minden and located two nautical miles (4 km) northwest of its central business district. It was formerly known as Minden-Webster Airport.

Although many U.S. airports use the same three-letter location identifier for the FAA and IATA, this airport is assigned MNE by the FAA but has no designation from the IATA (which assigned MNE to Mungeranie, South Australia, Australia).

== Facilities and aircraft ==
Minden Airport covers an area of 35 acres (14 ha) at an elevation of 278 feet (85 m) above mean sea level. It has one runway designated 1/19 with an asphalt surface measuring 5,004 by 75 feet (1,525 x 23 m).

For the 12-month period ending May 10, 2011, the airport had 15,000 aircraft operations, an average of 41 per day: 86% general aviation and 14% military. At that time there were 18 aircraft based at this airport: 89% single-engine, 6% multi-engine, and 6% ultralight.

== See also ==
- List of airports in Louisiana
