= Ribosomal protein L20 leader =

Ribosomal protein leader

L20_leader
- Consensus secondary structure and sequence conservation of Ribosomal protein L20 leader

Identifiers
- Symbol: L20_leader
- Rfam: RF00558

Other data
- RNA type: Cis-reg; leader
- GO: GO:0010468
- SO: SO:0000233
- PDB structures: PDBe

L20-Deltaproteobacteria
- Consensus secondary structure and sequence conservation of L20-Deltaproteobacteria ribosomal protein leader

Identifiers
- Symbol: L20-Deltaproteobacteria
- Rfam: RF03126

Other data
- RNA type: Cis-reg; leader
- SO: SO:0000837
- PDB structures: PDBe

L20 ribosomal protein leader is a ribosomal protein leader involved in the ribosome biogenesis. It is used as an autoregulatory mechanism to control the concentration of ribosomal proteins L20. The structure is typically located in the 5′ untranslated regions of mRNAs encoding initiation factor 3 followed by ribosomal proteins L35 and L20 (infC-rpmI-rplT), but the regulated mRNAs always contain an L20 gene. A Rho-independent transcription terminator structure that is probably involved in regulation is included at the 3′ end in many examples of L20 ribosomal protein leaders. Three structurally distinct forms of L20 leaders have been experimentally established. One such leader motif occurs in Bacillota and the other two are found in Gammaproteobacteria. Of the latter two, one is found in a wide variety of Gammaproteobacteria, while the other is only reported in Escherichia coli. All three types of leader exhibit apparent similarities to the region of Ribosomal RNA to which the L20 protein normally binds. However, in terms of RNA secondary structure, the context of the similar region is distinct in each leader type.

A fourth example of an L20 ribosomal protein leader was predicted in Deltaproteobacteria using bioinformatic approaches. Like the three experimentally validated kinds of leader, the Deltaproteobacterial version resembles the relevant portion of ribosomal RNA, but presents this similarity in yet another structural context.

== See also ==
- Ribosomal protein leader
