= L25 ribosomal protein leader =

Ribosomal L25 leader
- Predicted secondary structure and sequence conservation of L25_leader. This picture was adapted from a previous publication.

Identifiers
- Symbol: L25
- Rfam: RF03131

Other data
- RNA type: Cis-reg; leader
- Domain(s): Bacteria
- PDB structures: PDBe

L25 ribosomal protein leader is a ribosomal protein leader involved in the ribosome biogenesis. It is used as an autoregulatory mechanism to control the concentration of the ribosomal protein L25. Known Examples were predicted in Gammaproteobacteria with bioinformatic approaches. or in Enterobacteria. The structure is located in the 5′ untranslated regions of mRNAs encoding ribosomal protein L25 (rplY).

== See also ==
- Ribosomal protein leader
