= St. Landry Parish Airport =

St. Landry Parish Airport Ahart Field
- IATA: OPL; ICAO: KOPL; FAA LID: OPL

Summary
- Airport type: Public
- Owner/Operator: St. Landry Parish
- Location: Opelousas, Louisiana
- Elevation AMSL: 75 ft / 23 m
- Coordinates: 30°33′30″N 092°05′58″W
- Website: www.oplairport.com
- Interactive map of St. Landry Parish Airport

Runways
Direction	Length		Surface
Direction	ft	m	Surface
18/36	5,999	1,828	Concrete
6/24	4,051	1,235	Concrete

Statistics (2007)
- Aircraft operations: 18,000
- Based aircraft: 34
- Source: Airport web site and FAA

St. Landry Parish Airport (IATA: OPL, ICAO: KOPL, FAA LID: OPL), also known as Ahart Field, is a public use airport located two nautical miles (4 km) northwest of the central business district of Opelousas, a city in St. Landry Parish, Louisiana, United States.

== Facilities and aircraft ==
St. Landry Parish Airport covers an area of 537 acres (217 ha) at an elevation of 75 feet (23 m) above mean sea level. It has two concrete paved runways: 18/36 measuring 5,999 x 100 ft (1,828 x 30 m) and 6/24 measuring 4,051 x 100 ft (1,235 x 30 m).

For the 12-month period ending June 26, 2007, the airport had 18,000 general aviation aircraft operations, an average of 49 per day. At that time there were 34 aircraft based at this airport: 74% single-engine, 24% multi-engine and 3% ultralight.

== See also ==
- List of airports in Louisiana
