= L31 ribosomal protein leader =

Ribosomal L31 leader
- Predicted secondary structure and sequence conservation of L31_leader. This picture was adapted from a previous publication.

Identifiers
- Symbol: L31

Other data
- RNA type: Cis-reg; leader
- Domain(s): Bacteria
- PDB structures: PDBe

An L31 ribosomal protein leader is a ribosomal protein leader involved in ribosome biogenesis. It is used as an autoregulatory mechanism to control the concentration of the ribosomal protein L31. Five structurally distinct types of L31 ribosomal protein leader were predicted with a bioinformatic approach. The structure is located in the 5′ untranslated regions of mRNAs encoding ribosomal protein L31 (rpmE), and in one case L32 (rpmF). These are found in different species of Actinomycetota, Bacillota or Gammaproteobacteria. The gammaproteobacterial type was also detected and validated in an independent experimental study using the organism Escherichia coli.

== See also ==
- Ribosomal protein leader
