= Kelly Airport =

- IATA: none; ICAO: none; FAA LID: 9M6

Summary
- Airport type: Public
- Owner: West Carroll Parish
- Serves: Oak Grove, Louisiana
- Elevation AMSL: 112 ft (34 m)
- Coordinates: 32°50′57″N 091°24′14″W

Map
- Location of airport in Louisiana 9M6 (the United States)

Runways
Direction	Length		Surface
Direction	ft	m	Surface
18/36	3,000	914	Asphalt

Statistics (2012)
- Aircraft operations: 10,000
- Based aircraft: 5
- Source: Federal Aviation Administration

Kelly Airport (FAA LID: 9M6) is a public use airport in West Carroll Parish, Louisiana, United States. It is owned by the West Carroll Parish and located one nautical mile (2 km) southwest of the central business district of Oak Grove, Louisiana.

This airport is included in the National Plan of Integrated Airport Systems for 2011–2015, which categorized it as a general aviation facility.

== Facilities and aircraft ==
Kelly Airport covers an area of 28 acres (11 ha) at an elevation of 112 feet (34 m) above mean sea level. It has one runway designated 18/36 with an asphalt surface measuring 3,000 by 60 feet (914 x 18 m).

For the 12-month period ending March 13, 2012, the airport had 10,000 general aviation aircraft operations, an average of 27 per day. At that time there were 5 aircraft based at this airport: 60% single-engine and 40% ultralight.

== See also ==
- List of airports in Louisiana
