= Jonesboro Airport =

- IATA: none; ICAO: none; FAA LID: F88

Summary
- Airport type: Public
- Owner: City of Jonesboro
- Serves: Jonesboro, Louisiana
- Elevation AMSL: 256 ft (78 m)
- Coordinates: 32°12′07″N 092°43′59″W
- Interactive map of Jonesboro Airport

Runways
Direction	Length		Surface
Direction	ft	m	Surface
17/35	3,203	976	Asphalt

Statistics (2009)
- Aircraft operations: 24,000
- Source: Federal Aviation Administration

Jonesboro Airport (FAA LID: F88) is a city-owned public-use airport located three nautical miles (6 km) south of the central business district of Jonesboro, a city in Jackson Parish, Louisiana, United States.

== Facilities and aircraft ==
Jonesboro Airport covers an area of 140 acres (57 ha) at an elevation of 256 feet (78 m) above mean sea level. It has one asphalt paved runway designated 17/35 which measures 3,203 by 75 feet (976 x 23 m). For the 12-month period ending April 16, 2009, the airport had 24,000 general aviation aircraft operations, an average of 65 per day.

== See also ==
- List of airports in Louisiana
