= Leesville Airport =

- IATA: none; ICAO: none; FAA LID: L39

Summary
- Airport type: Public
- Owner/Operator: City of Leesville
- Serves: Leesville
- Location: Leesville, Louisiana, U.S.
- Time zone: Central Time Zone (UTC-6)
- Elevation AMSL: 281 ft / 85.6 m
- Coordinates: 31°10′05″N 093°20′32″W
- Website: Leesville Airport

Map
- Location of L39 in Louisiana L39 (the United States)

Runways
| Direction | Length | | Surface |
| Direction | ft | m | Surface |
|---|---|---|---|
| 18/36 | 3,807 | 1,160 | Asphalt |

Statistics (2016)
- Based aircraft: 15
- Operations: 15,000
- Source: Federal Aviation Administration

Leesville Airport is a city-owned, public-use general aviation airport located 4 nautical miles (7.4 km) west of Leesville, a city in Vernon Parish, Louisiana, United States.

Due to the small size of Leesville Airport, it has been assigned the three-letter FAA location identifier of L39, but has no corresponding IATA or ICAO designations.

Leesville Airport is listed as a "Local/Basic" airport in the 2017-2021 National Plan of Integrated Airport Systems Report. Between 2017 and 2021, it was expected to receive $4,914,250 in developmental funding.

== Facilities and aircraft ==
Leesville Airport covers an area of 120 acres (49 ha) at an elevation of 281 feet (85.6 m) above mean sea level. It has one runway: 18/36 is 3,807 by 75 feet (1,460 x 23 m) with an asphalt surface.

For the 12-month period ending September 22, 2016, the airport had 15,000 aircraft operations, an average of 41 per day: 67% local general aviation (10,000), 20% itinerant general aviation (3,000), and 13% military (2,000). At that time there were 15 aircraft based at this airport: 93% single-engine (14), and 7% helicopter (1).

== See also ==
- List of airports in Louisiana
