= Ribosomal protein leader =

Mechanism used in cells

A ribosomal protein leader is a mechanism used in cells to control the cellular concentration of a protein that forms a part of the ribosome, and to make sure that the concentration is neither too high nor too low. Ribosomal protein leaders are RNA sequences that are a part of the 5' UTR of mRNAs encoding a ribosomal protein. When cellular concentrations of the ribosomal protein are high, excess protein will bind to the mRNA leader. This binding event can lower gene expression via a number of mechanisms; for example, in the protein-bound state, the RNA could form an intrinsic transcription termination stem-loop. When cellular concentrations of the ribosomal protein are not high, they are occupied in the ribosome, and are not available in significant quantities to bind the mRNA leader. This leads to increased expression of the gene, which leads to the synthesis of more copies of the ribosomal protein. Many examples of ribosomal protein leaders are known in bacteria, including ribosomal protein L20 leader and ribosomal S15 leader. Ribosomal leaders typically bind ribosomal proteins that normally bind ribosomal RNA. In many cases, the binding site within the leader structurally resembles the region of the ribosomal RNA to which the protein binds, in an example of molecular mimicry.

== See also ==
Ribosome subunits
Small subunit	Large subunit
	L2 Ribosomal protein leader
S4 Ribosomal protein leader	L4 Ribosomal protein leader
S10 Ribosomal protein leader	L10 Ribosomal protein leader
S15 Ribosomal protein leader	L13 Ribosomal protein leader
	eL15 Ribosomal protein leader
S16 Ribosomal protein leader	L17 Ribosomal protein leader
S6:S18 Ribosomal protein leader	L19 Ribosomal protein leader
	L20 Ribosomal protein leader
	L21 Ribosomal protein leader
	L25 Ribosomal protein leader
	L31 Ribosomal protein leader
