= Newellton Airport =

- IATA: none; ICAO: none; FAA LID: 9M2

Summary
- Airport type: Public
- Owner: Town of Newellton
- Serves: Newellton, Louisiana
- Elevation AMSL: 77 ft / 23 m
- Coordinates: 32°03′43″N 91°15′05″W

Map
- Location of airport in Louisiana F86 (the United States)

Runways
| Direction | Length | | Surface |
| Direction | ft | m | Surface |
|---|---|---|---|
| 6/24 | 2,750 | 838 | Asphalt |

Statistics (2000)
- Aircraft operations: 7,000
- Based aircraft: 8
- Source: Federal Aviation Administration

Newellton Airport (FAA LID: 9M2) is a public use airport in Tensas Parish, Louisiana, United States. It is owned by the Town of Newellton and located one mile (2 km) southwest of its central business district.

== Facilities and aircraft ==
Newellton Airport covers an area of 20 acres (8 ha) at an elevation of 77 feet (23 m) above mean sea level. It has one runway designated 6/24 with an asphalt surface measuring 2,750 by 75 feet (838 x 23 m).

For the 12-month period ending August 15, 2000, the airport had 7,000 general aviation aircraft operations, an average of 19 per day. At that time, there were eight single-engines based at this airport.

== See also ==
- List of airports in Louisiana
