= Morehouse Memorial Airport =

- IATA: none; ICAO: KBQP; FAA LID: BQP

Summary
- Airport type: Public
- Owner: City of Bastrop
- Serves: Bastrop, Louisiana
- Elevation AMSL: 168 ft / 51 m
- Coordinates: 32°45′22″N 091°52′50″W

Map
- Location of airport in Louisiana BQP (the United States)

Runways
Direction	Length		Surface
Direction	ft	m	Surface
16/34	4,002	1,220	Asphalt

Statistics (2012)
- Aircraft operations: 30,200
- Based aircraft: 16
- Source: Federal Aviation Administration

Morehouse Memorial Airport (ICAO: KBQP, FAA LID: BQP, formerly 2F8) is a public use airport in Morehouse Parish, Louisiana, United States. It is owned by the City of Bastrop and located two nautical miles (4 km) southeast of its central business district. This airport is included in the National Plan of Integrated Airport Systems for 2011–2015, which categorized it as a general aviation facility.

Although many U.S. airports use the same three-letter location identifier for the FAA and IATA, this airport is assigned BQP by the FAA but has no designation from the IATA.

== Facilities and aircraft ==
Morehouse Memorial Airport covers an area of 440 acres (178 ha) at an elevation of 168 feet (51 m) above mean sea level. It has one runway designated 16/34 with an asphalt surface measuring 4,002 by 100 feet (1,220 x 30 m).

For the 12-month period ending March 14, 2012, the airport had 30,200 aircraft operations, an average of 82 per day: 99% general aviation and 1% military. At that time there were 16 aircraft based at this airport: 94% single-engine and 6% multi-engine.

== See also ==
- List of airports in Louisiana
