= Charlie Hammonds Seaplane Base =

- IATA: none; ICAO: none; FAA LID: 3L1

Summary
- Airport type: Public
- Owner: Charlie Hammonds
- Serves: Houma, Louisiana
- Elevation AMSL: 5 ft (1.5 m)
- Coordinates: 29°35′19″N 90°42′52″W
- Interactive map of Charlie Hammonds Seaplane Base

Runways
Direction	Length		Surface
Direction	ft	m	Surface
1W/19W	6,000	1,829	Water

Statistics (2006)
- Aircraft operations: 7,400
- Source: Federal Aviation Administration

Charlie Hammonds Seaplane Base (FAA LID: 3L1) was a public-use seaplane base located at 1200 Dunn Street in Houma, a city in Terrebonne Parish, Louisiana, United States. It is privately owned by Charlie Hammonds and managed by Carol Hammonds.

== Facilities and aircraft ==
Charlie Hammonds Seaplane Base covers an area of 1 acre (4,000 m^{2}). It has one seaplane landing area (1W/19W) measuring 6,000 by 150 ft (1,829 by 46 m) which is located on the Intracoastal Waterway. For the 12-month period ending November 15, 2006, the airport had 7,400 general aviation aircraft operations, an average of 20 per day.
