= 50S ribosomal protein L25 =

50S ribosomal subunit protein L25
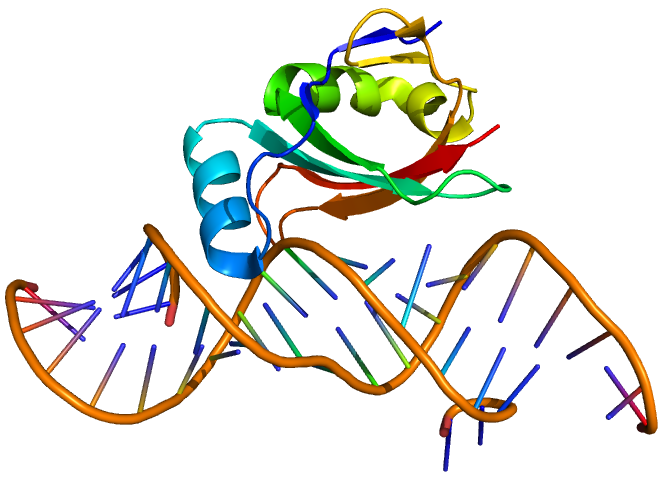
- Crystal structure of e. coli ribosomal protein l25 complexed with a 5S rRNA fragment based on PDB: 1DFU

Identifiers
- Organism: Escherichia coli (strain K-12 substrain MG1655)
- Symbol: rplY
- Entrez: 945618
- PDB: 1DFU
- UniProt: P68919

Other data
- Chromosome: genome: 2.28 - 2.28 Mb
Search for
- Structures: Swiss-model
- Domains: InterPro

50S ribosomal protein L25 is a protein that in Escherichia coli is encoded by the rplY gene.

== Function ==
This ribosomal protein is a component of the 50S subunit. The protein binds 5S rRNA to form a stable complex. In turn 5S rRNA binds specifically to three proteins, L25, L18 and L5, forming a separate domain of the bacterial ribosome. Protein L25 of E. coli is not essential for survival of the cells.

== Interactions ==
Ribosomal protein L25 has been shown to interact with:

- 50S ribosomal protein L16
- 5S ribosomal RNA
