= Ribosomal protein L19 leader =

L19_leader
- Consensus secondary structure and sequence conservation of Ribosomal protein L19 leader

Identifiers
- Symbol: L19_leader
- Rfam: RF00556

Other data
- RNA type: Cis-reg; leader
- GO: GO:0010468
- SO: SO:0000233
- PDB structures: PDBe

L19-Flavobacteria
- Consensus secondary structure and sequence conservation of L19-Flavobacteria ribosomal protein leader

Identifiers
- Symbol: L19-Flavobacteria
- Rfam: RF03130

Other data
- RNA type: Cis-reg; leader
- SO: SO:0000837
- PDB structures: PDBe

L19 Ribosomal protein leaders are part of the ribosome biogenesis. They are used as an autoregulatory mechanism to control the concentration of ribosomal proteins L19, and are located in the 5′ untranslated regions of mRNAs encoding ribosomal protein L19 (rplS). L19 ribosomal protein leaders have been bioinformatically predicted in B. subtilis and other low-GC Gram-positive bacteria in the phylum Bacillota. More examples that share a similar structure were predicted in Flavobacteria, also using bioinformatic approaches.

== See also ==
- Ribosomal protein leader
