= Lectionary 19 =

Lectionary ℓ 19
- New Testament manuscript
- Text: Evangelistarion
- Date: 13th-century
- Script: Greek
- Found: 1661
- Now at: Bodleian Library
- Size: 31 cm by 22.5 cm
- Note: neumes

Lectionary 19, designated by siglum ℓ 19 (in the Gregory-Aland numbering) is a Greek manuscript of the New Testament, written on vellum leaves. Palaeographically it has been assigned to the 13th-century.

== Description ==
The codex contains lessons from the Gospels of John, Matthew, Luke lectionary (Evangelistarium), with lacunae. The text is written in Greek minuscule letters, on 322 parchment leaves (31 cm by 22.5 cm), 2 columns per page, 24 lines per page. It contains the Byzantine musical notes – neumes.

== History ==
The codex was given in 1661 by Parthenius, Patriarch of Constantinople, to Heneage Finch, Earl of Winchelesa, British Ambassador at the court of sultan. It was known as Codex Bodleianus 5.

It was added to the list of the New Testament manuscripts by Johann Jakob Wettstein. It was examined by Mill (as Bodleianus 7) and Griesbach. According to Mill this codex is Stephen's ϛ'.

The manuscript is sporadically cited in the critical editions of the Greek New Testament (UBS3).

Currently the codex is located in the Bodleian Library (Auct. D. inf. 2.12) in Oxford.

== See also ==
- List of New Testament lectionaries
- Biblical manuscript
- Textual criticism

== Bibliography ==
- Gregory, Caspar René (1900). Textkritik des Neuen Testaments. Vol. 1. Leipzig: Hinrichs. pp. 388–389.
