= Union Parish Airport =

- IATA: none; ICAO: none; FAA LID: F87

Summary
- Airport type: Public
- Owner: Union Parish Police Jury
- Serves: Farmerville, Louisiana
- Elevation AMSL: 121 ft / 37 m
- Coordinates: 32°43′30″N 092°20′14″W

Map
- Location of airport in Louisiana F87 (the United States)

Runways
Direction	Length		Surface
Direction	ft	m	Surface
16/34	2,997	913	Asphalt

Statistics (2011)
- Aircraft operations: 15,500
- Based aircraft: 19
- Source: Federal Aviation Administration

Union Parish Airport (FAA LID: F87) is a public use airport in Union Parish, Louisiana, United States. It is owned by the Union Parish Police Jury and located four nautical miles (5 mi, 7 km) southeast of the central business district of Farmerville, Louisiana. This airport is included in the National Plan of Integrated Airport Systems for 2011–2015, which categorized it as a general aviation facility.

== Facilities and aircraft ==
Union Parish Airport covers an area of 47 acres (19 ha) at an elevation of 121 feet (37 m) above mean sea level. It has one runway designated 16/34 with an asphalt surface measuring 2,997 by 70 feet (913 x 21 m).

For the 12-month period ending December 15, 2011, the airport had 15,500 general aviation aircraft operations, an average of 42 per day. At that time there were 19 aircraft based at this airport: 95% single-engine and 5% ultralight.

== See also ==
- List of airports in Louisiana
