= Haynesville Airport =

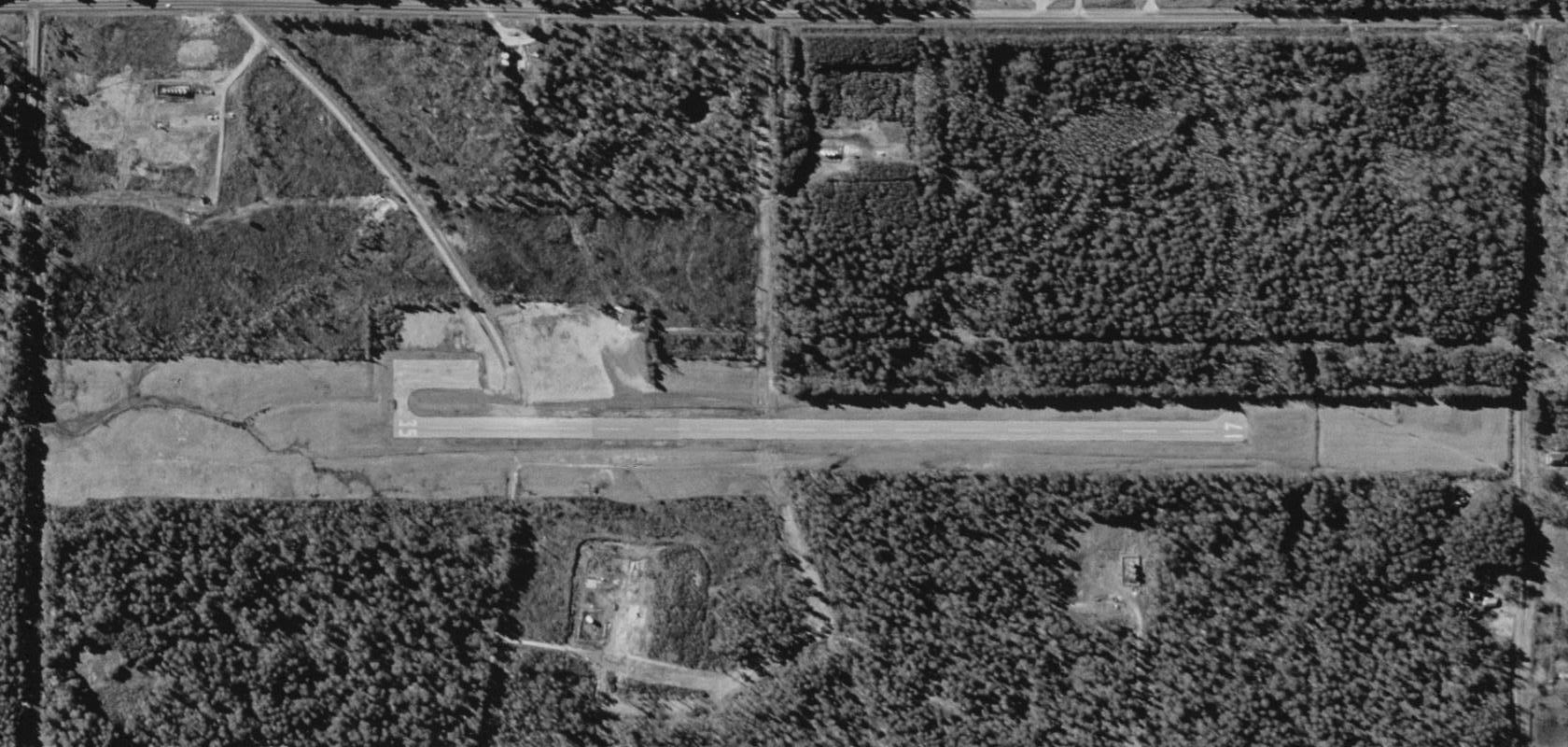
- USGS aerial image, 1998 (north is to the right)
- IATA: none; ICAO: none; FAA LID: 5F3

Summary
- Airport type: Public
- Owner: City of Haynesville
- Serves: Haynesville, Louisiana
- Elevation AMSL: 348 ft / 106 m
- Coordinates: 32°59′11″N 093°08′19″W
- Interactive map of Haynesville Airport

Runways
Direction	Length		Surface
Direction	ft	m	Surface
17/35	3,000	914	Asphalt
- Source: Federal Aviation Administration

Haynesville Airport (FAA LID: 5F3) was a public use airport located in Claiborne Parish, Louisiana, United States. The airport was owned by City of Haynesville and in the town limits but located two nautical miles (3.7 km) north of its central business district. The land for the airport was donated by Erastus and Fanny Crump of Claiborne Parish.

== Facilities ==
Haynesville Airport covered an area of 40 acres (16 ha) at an elevation of 348 feet (106 m) above mean sea level. It had one runway designated 17/35 with an asphalt surface measuring 3,000 by 75 feet (914 x 23 m).
