= Caldwell Parish Airport =

Airport in Caldwell Parish, Louisiana, U.S.

- IATA: none; ICAO: none; FAA LID: F86

Summary
- Airport type: Public
- Owner: Caldwell Parish Police Jury
- Serves: Columbia, Louisiana
- Elevation AMSL: 67 ft (20 m)
- Coordinates: 32°07′20″N 092°03′16″W

Map
- Location of airport in Louisiana F86 (the United States)

Runways
Direction	Length		Surface
Direction	ft	m	Surface
1/19	3,501	1,067	Asphalt

Statistics (2020)
- Aircraft operations (year ending 3/18/2020): 13,750
- Based aircraft: 10
- Source: Federal Aviation Administration

Caldwell Parish Airport (FAA LID: F86) is a public use airport in Caldwell Parish, Louisiana, United States. It is owned by the Caldwell Parish Police Jury and located two nautical miles (4 km) northeast of the central business district of Columbia, Louisiana. It was formerly known as Columbia Airport.

== Facilities and aircraft ==
Caldwell Parish Airport covers an area of 70 acres (28 ha) at an elevation of 67 feet (20 m) above mean sea level. It has one runway designated 1/19 with an asphalt surface measuring 3,501 by 75 feet (1,067 x 23 m).

For the 12-month period ending March 18, 2020, the airport had 13,750 general aviation aircraft operations, an average of 38 per day. At that time there were 10 aircraft based at this airport: all single-engine.

== See also ==
- List of airports in Louisiana
