= Ribosomal protein L21 leader =

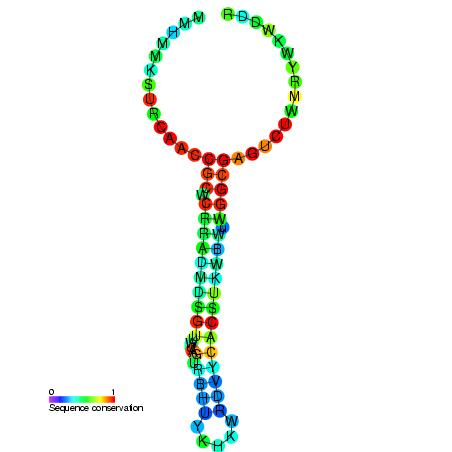
- Predicted secondary structure and sequence conservation of L21_leader

Identifiers
- Symbol: L21_leader
- Rfam: RF00559

Other data
- RNA type: Cis-reg; leader
- Domain(s): Bacteria
- SO: SO:0000233
- PDB structures: PDBe

A ribosomal protein L21 leader is a ribosomal protein leader autoregulatory structure that regulates mRNAs containing a gene that encodes ribosomal protein L21. An RNA motif was predicted to function as an L21 leader in a bioinformatics study, and is found in B. subtilis and other low-GC Gram-positive bacteria within the phylum Bacillota. It is located in the 5′ untranslated regions of mRNAs encoding ribosomal protein L21, a protein of unknown function, and ribosomal protein L27 (rplU-ysxB-rpmA).

== See also ==
Ribosomal protein leader
