= Grand Isle Seaplane Base =

- IATA: none; ICAO: KGNI; FAA LID: GNI

Summary
- Airport type: Private
- Owner: Freeport Sulphur Company
- Serves: Grand Isle, Louisiana
- Elevation AMSL: 0 ft (0 m)
- Coordinates: 29°15′46″N 089°57′40″W
- Interactive map of Grand Isle Seaplane Base

Runways
Direction	Length		Surface
Direction	ft	m	Surface
ALL/WAY	15,000	4,572	Water
- Source: Federal Aviation Administration

Grand Isle Seaplane Base (ICAO: KGNI, FAA LID: GNI) is a private-use seaplane base located three nautical miles (6 km) northeast of the central business district of Grand Isle, in Jefferson Parish, Louisiana, United States. It is owned by the Freeport Sulphur Company.

Although most U.S. airports use the same three-letter location identifier for the FAA and IATA, Grand Isle Seaplane Base is assigned GNI by the FAA but has no designation from the IATA (which assigned GNI to Lyudao Airport in Green Island, Taiwan).

== Facilities ==
Grand Isle Seaplane Base has one landing area measuring 15,000 x 200 feet (4,572 x 61 m).

== See also ==
- List of airports in Louisiana
