= Allen Parish Airport =

- IATA: none; ICAO: KACP; FAA LID: ACP

Summary
- Airport type: Public
- Owner: Allen Parish Police Jury
- Serves: Oakdale, Louisiana
- Elevation AMSL: 107 ft (33 m)
- Coordinates: 30°45′02″N 092°41′19″W

Map
- Location of airport in Louisiana ACP (the United States)

Runways
Direction	Length		Surface
Direction	ft	m	Surface
18/36	4,994	1,522	Asphalt

Statistics (2011)
- Aircraft operations: 12,500
- Based aircraft: 7
- Source: Federal Aviation Administration

Allen Parish Airport (ICAO: KACP, FAA LID: ACP, formerly L42) is a public use airport in Allen Parish, Louisiana, United States. It is owned by the Allen Parish Police Jury and located four nautical miles (5 mi, 7 km) south of the central business district of Oakdale, Louisiana. This airport is included in the National Plan of Integrated Airport Systems for 2011–2015, which categorized it as a general aviation facility.

Although many U.S. airports use the same three-letter location identifier for the FAA and IATA, this airport is assigned ACP by the FAA but has no designation from the IATA (which assigned ACP to Sahand Airport in Maragheh, Iran).

== Facilities and aircraft ==
Allen Parish Airport covers an area of 538 acres (218 ha) at an elevation of 107 feet (33 m) above mean sea level. It has one runway designated 18/36 with an asphalt surface measuring 5000 by 75 feet (1,522 x 23 m).

For the 12-month period ending December 6, 2011, the airport had 12,500 aircraft operations, an average of 34 per day: 88% general aviation and 12% military. At that time there were seven single-engine aircraft based at this airport.

== See also ==
- List of airports in Louisiana
