= Slidell Airport =

- IATA: none; ICAO: KASD; FAA LID: ASD

Summary
- Airport type: Public
- Owner: City of Slidell
- Serves: Slidell, Louisiana
- Elevation AMSL: 29 ft / 9 m
- Coordinates: 30°20′47″N 089°49′15″W
- Interactive map of Slidell Airport

Runways
Direction	Length		Surface
Direction	ft	m	Surface
18/36	5,001	1,524	Asphalt

Statistics (2008)
- Aircraft operations: 112,000
- Based aircraft: 86
- Source: Federal Aviation Administration

Slidell Airport (ICAO: KASD, FAA LID: ASD) is a city-owned public-use airport located four nautical miles (7 km) northwest of the central business district of Slidell, a city in St. Tammany Parish, Louisiana, United States.

Although most U.S. airports use the same three-letter location identifier for the FAA and IATA, this airport is assigned ASD by the FAA but has no designation from the IATA (which assigned ASD to Andros Town Airport on Andros Island in the Bahamas).

== Facilities and aircraft ==
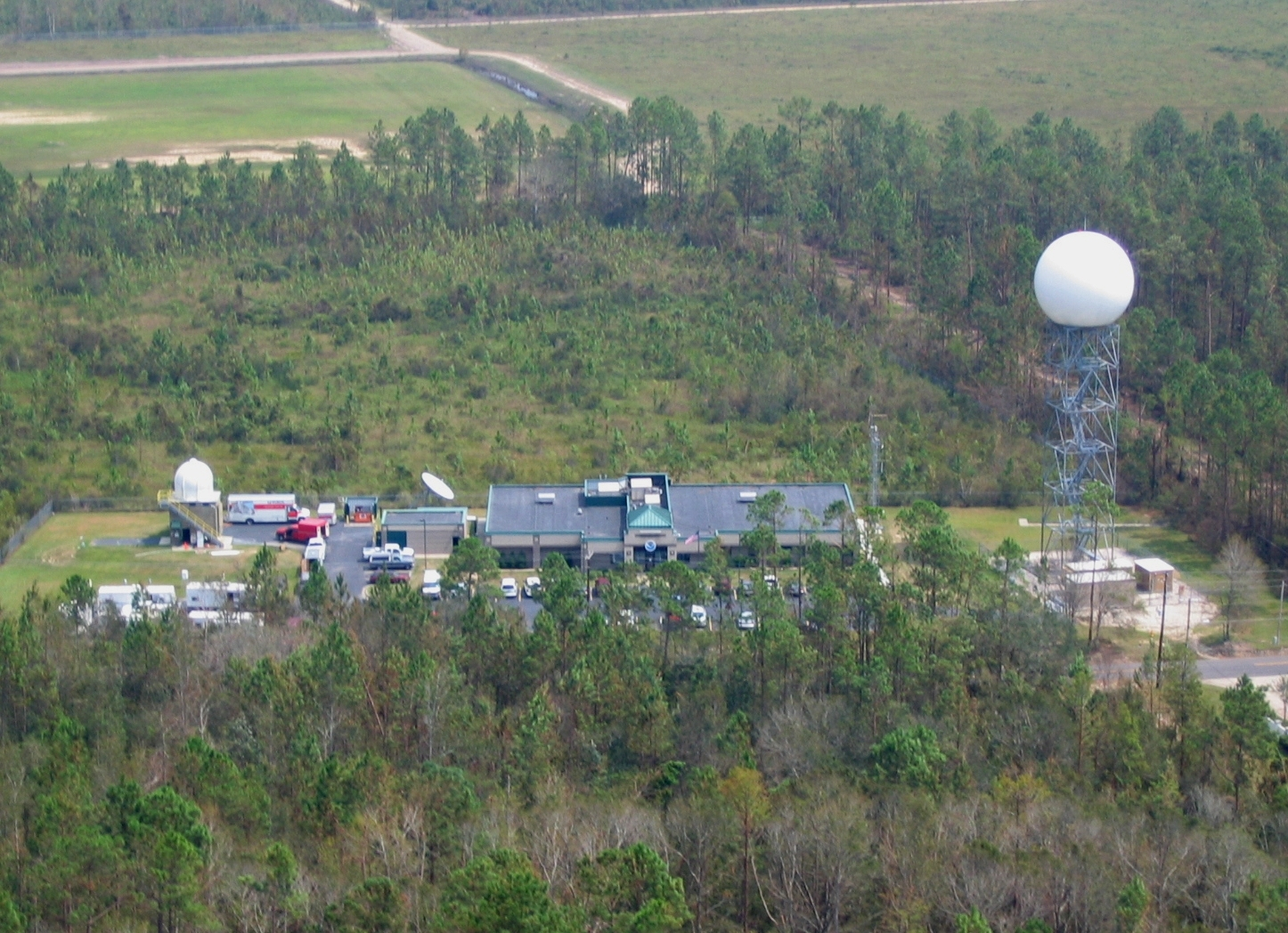
NWS office by the airport

Slidell Airport covers an area of 340 acres (140 ha) at an elevation of 29 feet (9 m) above mean sea level. It has one runway designated 18/36 with a 5,001 by 100 ft (1,524 x 30 m) asphalt surface.

The Louisiana Office of the National Weather Service is located here.

For the 12-month period ending April 15, 2008, the airport had 112,000 aircraft operations, an average of 306 per day: 96% general aviation, 4% military. At that time there were 86 aircraft based at this airport: 87% single-engine, 9% multi-engine, 2% helicopter and 1% jet.

== See also ==
- List of airports in Louisiana
