= Harry P. Williams Memorial Airport =

Airport in Patterson, Louisiana, United States

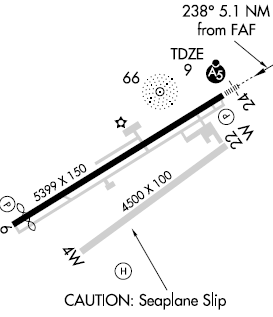
- IATA: PTN; ICAO: KPTN; FAA LID: PTN

Summary
- Airport type: Public
- Owner: State of Louisiana
- Operator: Ken Perry
- Serves: Patterson, Louisiana
- Location: Patterson, Louisiana
- Elevation AMSL: 9 ft / 3 m
- Coordinates: 29°42′34″N 091°20′20″W
- Interactive map of Harry P. Williams Memorial Airport

Runways
Direction	Length		Surface
Direction	ft	m	Surface
6/24	5,399	1,646	Asphalt
4W/22W	4,500	1,372	Water

Statistics (June 2008)
- Aircraft located at the airport: 27
- Source: Federal Aviation Administration

Harry P. Williams Memorial Airport (IATA: PTN, ICAO: KPTN, FAA LID: PTN) is a public airport located near the U.S. 90 (future Interstate 49) highway outside of Patterson, Louisiana, United States with the airfield also serving Morgan City, Louisiana. It has two runways, one of them being water for seaplanes.

== Historical airline service ==
Several air carriers operating scheduled passenger flights served the airport over the years. In 1931, Wedell-Williams Air Service was operating a daily round trip flight on a New Orleans - Patterson - Beaumont - Houston routing flown with Lockheed Vega and Ryan Aeronautical "Cabin" aircraft. Trans-Texas Airways (TTa) was serving the airport in 1961 with direct, no change of plane service operated on a twice daily basis with Douglas DC-3 aircraft to Dallas Love Field, Fort Worth and Shreveport via stops in Lafayette and Lake Charles as well as two daily nonstop DC-3 flights to New Orleans. By 1963, Trans-Texas was operating daily round trip service flown with a Douglas DC-3 on a routing of New Orleans - Patterson - Lafayette - Lake Charles - Shreveport - Marshall, TX - Dallas Love Field as well as an additional daily nonstop Patterson - New Orleans DC-3 flight. Trans-Texas was no longer serving the airport by 1966 and would subsequently change its name to Texas International Airlines, become an all-jet air carrier operating DC-9 twin jets and then eventually be merged into Continental Airlines.

During the mid 1970s, Bee Line, a small commuter air carrier based in the Houston area, was operating nonstop flights between Patterson and Houston Hobby Airport (HOU) on the weekdays with small prop aircraft. During 1976-1977, Coastal Airways was operating nonstop service to both Baton Rouge (BTR) and New Orleans (MSY) with twin prop commuter aircraft. By 1978, Royale Airlines, a regional air carrier based in Louisiana, was operating direct one stop service to New Orleans (MSY) via Houma, LA with Beechcraft 99 commuter turboprops. In early 1979, Universal Airways, a commuter air carrier, was serving the airport with round trip New Orleans - Houma - Patterson/Morgan City - Houston Hobby Airport flights operated with Beechcraft Queen Air twin prop commuter aircraft. By late 1979, two commuter air carriers were serving the airport: Commutair operating Beechcraft aircraft with nonstop service from Houston Hobby Airport and direct one stop service from Houston Intercontinental Airport, and Hammonds Flying Service operating Piper aircraft with nonstop service from Lafayette and Houma as well as direct one stop service from Houston Hobby Airport via Lafayette. By the early 1980s, Hammonds Commuter Air Service was operating four round trip flights every weekday on a Houma - Patterson - Lafayette - Houston Hobby Airport routing flown with Piper aircraft as well as with de Havilland Canada DHC-6 Twin Otter commuter turboprop aircraft.

The airport currently has no scheduled passenger service but is served by charter flights.

== Facilities ==
Available services include 100LL Fuel, Jet Fuel, as well as major airframe and powerplant service via the Perry Flying Center.

== Terminal procedures (instrument approach procedures) ==
- ILS RWY 24
- GPS RWY 6
- GPS RWY 24
- VOR/DME-A
- NDB RWY 6

== See also ==
- List of airports in Louisiana
