= Kaptin (actin binding protein) =

Protein found in humans

KPTN

Identifiers
- Aliases: KPTN, 2E4, MRT41, kaptin (actin binding protein), kaptin, actin binding protein, KICS4
- External IDs: OMIM: 615620; MGI: 1890380; GeneCards: KPTN

Gene location (Human)
Chr.	Chromosome 19 (human)
Band	19q13.32	Start	47,475,150 bp
Band	19q13.32	End	47,484,265 bp

Gene location (Mouse)
Chr.	Chromosome 7 (mouse)
Band	7 A2|7 8.75 cM	Start	15,853,820 bp
Band	7 A2|7 8.75 cM	End	15,861,441 bp
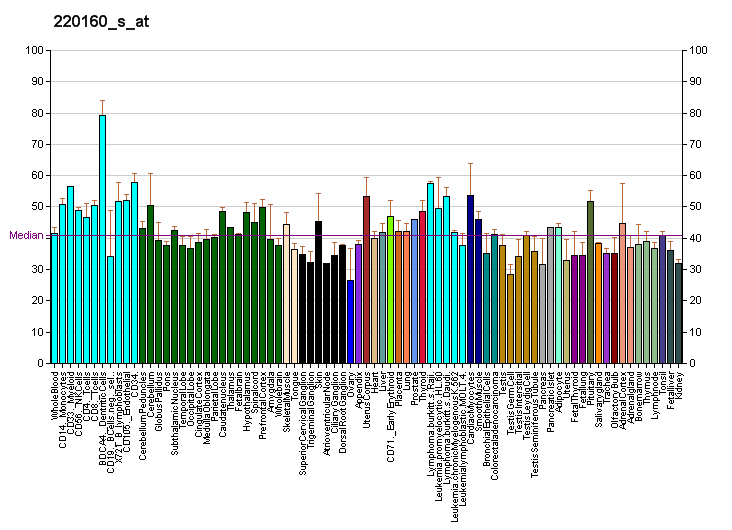
RNA expression pattern
Bgee	Human / Mouse (ortholog); Top expressed in: right hemisphere of cerebellum; gonad; parotid gland; endothelial cell; pituitary gland; anterior pituitary; apex of heart; testicle; ganglionic eminence; right frontal lobe / Top expressed in: interventricular septum; spermatocyte; visual cortex; superior frontal gyrus; primary visual cortex; spermatid; neural layer of retina; granulocyte; dentate gyrus of hippocampal formation granule cell; left lobe of liver; More reference expression data
BioGPS	More reference expression data
Gene ontology
Molecular function	actin binding; actin filament binding
Cellular component	cell projection; actin cytoskeleton; filamentous actin; postsynaptic actin cytoskeleton; stereocilium; KICSTOR complex; lysosome; lysosomal membrane; membrane; lamellipodium
Biological process	actin filament organization; cellular response to glucose starvation; protein localization to lysosome; negative regulation of TORC1 signaling; cellular response to amino acid starvation
Sources:Amigo / QuickGO
Orthologs
Databases	NCBI: entry; OMA: entry
Species	Human	Mouse
Entrez	11133	70394
Ensembl	ENSG00000118162	ENSMUSG00000006021
UniProt	Q9Y664	Q8VCX6
RefSeq (mRNA)	NM_001291296; NM_007059	NM_133727
RefSeq (protein)	NP_001278225; NP_008990	NP_598488
Location (UCSC)	Chr 19: 47.48 – 47.48 Mb	Chr 7: 15.85 – 15.86 Mb
PubMed search
- Wikidata
View/Edit Human	View/Edit Mouse

Kaptin is a protein that in humans is encoded by the KPTN gene.

== Clinical ==
Mutations in this gene have been associated with a syndrome of acrocephaly, muscular hypotonia, global development delay, dyspraxia and hand-mouth synkinesia.
