= Ribosome biogenesis =

Cellular process

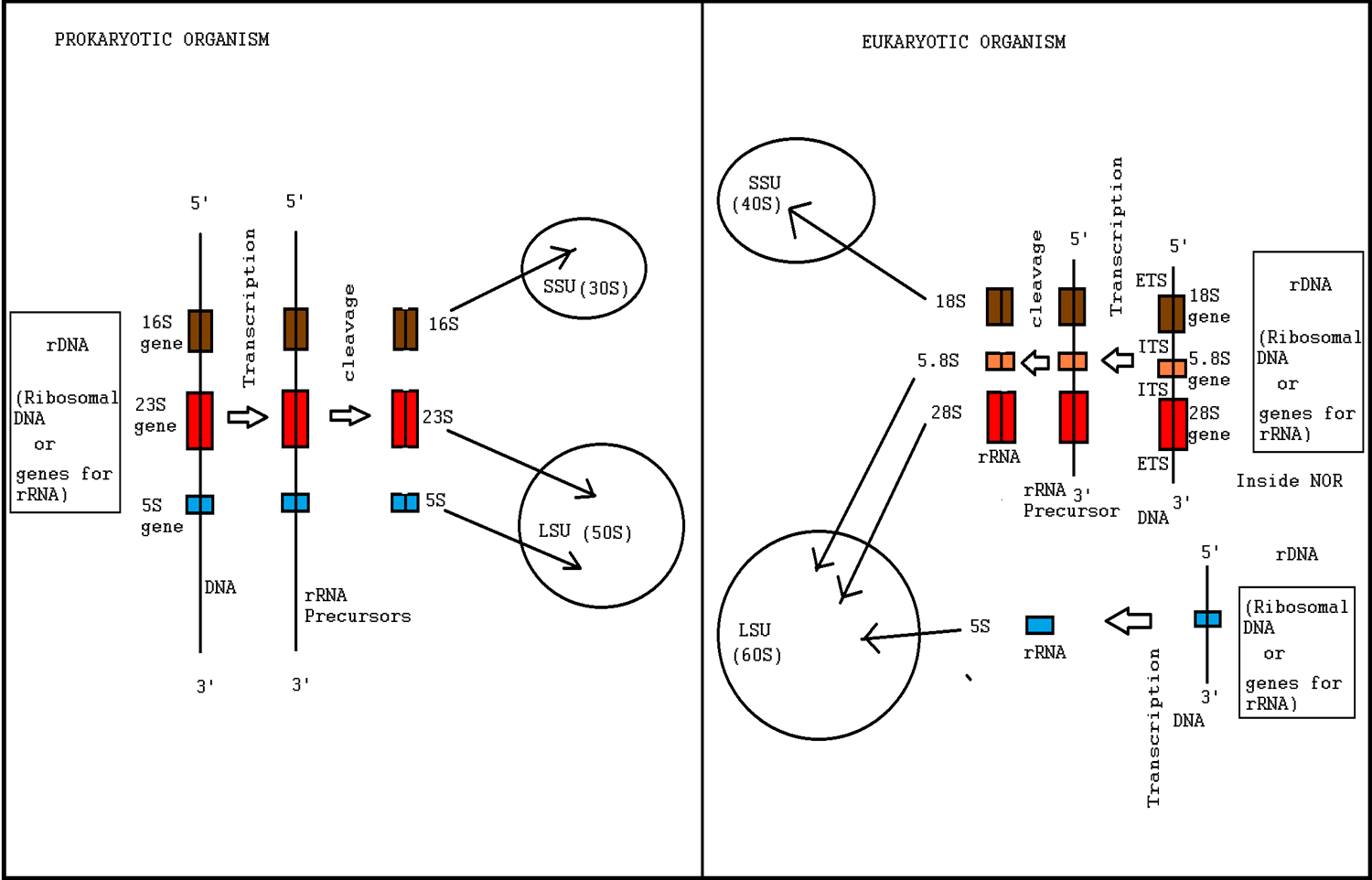
rRNA biogenesis and assembly in prokaryote and eukaryotes. Notably in Eukaryotes 5S rRNA is synthesised by RNA polymerase III whereas other eukaryote rRNA molecules are transcribed by RNA polymerase I.

Ribosome biogenesis is the process of making ribosomes. In prokaryotes, this process takes place in the cytoplasm with the transcription of many ribosome gene operons. In eukaryotes, it takes place both in the cytoplasm and in the nucleolus. It involves the coordinated function of over 200 proteins in the synthesis and processing of the three prokaryotic or four eukaryotic rRNAs, as well as assembly of those rRNAs with the ribosomal proteins. Most of the ribosomal proteins fall into various energy-consuming enzyme families including ATP-dependent RNA helicases, AAA-ATPases, GTPases, and kinases. About 60% of a cell's energy is spent on ribosome production and maintenance.

Ribosome biogenesis is a very tightly regulated process, and it is closely linked to other cellular activities like growth and division.

Some have speculated that in the origin of life, ribosome biogenesis predates cells, and that genes and cells evolved to enhance the reproductive capacity of ribosomes.

== Ribosomes ==
Ribosomes are the macromolecular machines that are responsible for mRNA translation into proteins. The eukaryotic ribosome, also called the 80S ribosome, is made up of two subunits – the large 60S subunit (which contains the 25S [in plants] or 28S [in mammals], 5.8S, and 5S rRNA and 46 ribosomal proteins) and a small 40S subunit (which contains the 18S rRNA and 33 ribosomal proteins). The ribosomal proteins are encoded by ribosomal genes.

rRNA found in prokaryotic and eukaryotic ribosomes
Type	Size	Large subunit (LSU rRNA)	Small subunit (SSU rRNA)
prokaryotic	70S	50S (5S : 120 nt, 23S : 2906 nt)	30S (16S : 1542 nt)
eukaryotic	80S	60S (5S : 121 nt, 5.8S : 156 nt, 28S : 5070 nt)	40S (18S : 1869 nt)

== Prokaryotes ==
There are 52 genes that encode the ribosomal proteins, and they can be found in 20 operons within prokaryotic DNA. Regulation of ribosome synthesis hinges on the regulation of the rRNA itself.

First, a reduction in aminoacyl-tRNA will cause the prokaryotic cell to respond by lowering transcription and translation. This occurs through a series of steps, beginning with stringent factors binding to ribosomes and catalyzing the reaction:
GTP + ATP → pppGpp + AMP

The γ-phosphate is then removed and ppGpp will bind to and inhibit RNA polymerase. This binding causes a reduction in rRNA transcription. A reduced amount of rRNA means that ribosomal proteins (r-proteins) will be translated but will not have an rRNA to bind to. Instead, they will negatively feedback and bind to their own mRNA, repressing r-protein synthesis. Note that r-proteins preferentially bind to their complementary rRNA if it is present, rather than mRNA.

The ribosome operons also include the genes for RNA polymerase and elongation factors (used in RNA translation). Regulation of all of these genes at once illustrate the coupling between transcription and translation in prokaryotes.

== Eukaryotes ==
Ribosomal protein synthesis in eukaryotes is a major metabolic activity. It occurs, like most protein synthesis, in the cytoplasm just outside the nucleus. Individual ribosomal proteins are synthesized and imported into the nucleus through nuclear pores. See nuclear import for more about the movement of the ribosomal proteins into the nucleus.

The DNA is transcribed, at a high speed, in the nucleolus, which contains all 45S rRNA genes. The only exception is the 5S rRNA which is transcribed outside the nucleolus. After transcription, the rRNAs associate with the ribosomal proteins, forming the two types of ribosomal subunits (large and small). These will later assemble in the cytosol to make a functioning ribosome. See nuclear export for more about the movement of the ribosomal subunits out of the nucleus.

=== Processing ===
Eukaryotic cells co-transcribe three of the mature rRNA species through a series of steps. The maturation process of the rRNAs and the process of recruiting the r-proteins happen in precursor ribosomal particles, sometimes called pre-ribosomes, and takes place in the nucleolus, nucleoplasm, and cytoplasm. The yeast, S. cerevisiae is the eukaryotic model organism for the study of ribosome biogenesis. Ribosome biogenesis starts in the nucleolus. There, the 35S pre-RNA is transcribed from ribosomal genes as a polycistronic transcript by RNA polymerase I and processed into the 18S, 5.8S, and 25S subunits of the rRNA.

Transcription of polymerase I starts with a Pol I initiation complex that binds to the rDNA promoter. The formation of this complex requires the help of an upstream activating factor or UAF that associates with TATA-box binding protein and the core factor (CF). Together the two transcription factors allow the RNA pol I complex to bind with the polymerase I initiation factor, Rrn3. As the pol I transcript is produced, approximately 75 small nucleolar ribonucleoparticles (snoRNPs) facilitate the co-transcriptional covalent modifications of >100 rRNA residues. These snoRNPs control 2'-O-ribose methylation of nucleotides and also assist in the creation of pseudouridines. At the 5' end of rRNA transcripts, small subunit ribosomal proteins (Rps) and non-ribosomal factors assemble with the pre-RNA transcripts to create ball-like knobs. These knobs are the first pre-ribosomal particles in the small (40S) ribosomal subunit pathway. The rRNA transcript is cleaved at the A2 site, and this separates the early 40S pre-ribosome from the remaining pre-rRNA that will combine with large subunit ribosomal proteins (Rpl) and other non-ribosomal factors to create the pre-60S ribosomal particles.

=== 40S subunit ===
The transcriptional assembly of the 40S subunit precursor, sometimes referred to as the small subunit processome (SSU) or 90S particle happens in a hierarchical fashion – essentially a stepwise incorporation of the UTP-A, UTP-B, and UTP-C subcomplexes. These subcomplexes are made up of over 30 non ribosomal protein factors, the U3 snoRNP particle, a few Rps proteins, and the 35S pre-rRNA. Their exact role, though has not been discovered. The composition of the pre-40S particle changes drastically once cleavage at the U3 snoRNPA dependent sites (sites A0, A1, and A2) are made. This cleavage event creates the 20S pre-rRNA and causes ribosomal factors to dissociate from the pre-40S particle. U3 is displaced from the nascent 40S by the helicase Dhr1. At this point in the ribosome biogenesis process, the 40S pre-ribosome already shows the "head" and "body" structures of the mature 40S subunit. The 40S pre-ribosome is transported out of the nucleolus and into the cytoplasm. The cytoplasmic 40S pre-ribosome now contains ribosomal proteins, the 20s rRNA and a few non-ribosomal factors. The final formation of the 40S subunit "beak" structure occurs after a phosphorylation and dephosphorylation event involving the Enp1-Ltv1-Rps3 complex and the kinase, Hrr25. Cleavage of the 20S pre-rRNA at the D-site creates the mature 18s rRNA. This cleavage event is dependent on several non-ribosomal factors such as Nob1, Rio1, Rio2, Tsr1 and Fap7.

=== 60S subunit ===
The maturation of the pre-60S subunit into a mature 60S subunit requires many biogenesis factors that associate and disassociate. In addition, some assembly factors associate with the 60S subunit while others only interact with it transiently. As an overall trend, the maturation of the pre-60S subunit is marked a gradual decrease in complexity. The subunit matures as it moves from the nucleolus to the cytoplasm and gradually the number of trans-acting factors are reduced. The maturation of the 60S subunit requires the help of about 80 factors. Eight of these factors are directly involved with the processing of the 27S A3 pre-rRNA, which actually completes the formation of the mature 5'end of the 5.8S rRNA. The A3 factors bind to distant sites on the pre-RNA as well as to each other. Subsequently, they bring areas of rRNA close together and promote the processing of pre-rRNA and the recruitment of ribosomal proteins. Three AAA-type ATPases work to strip the factors from the maturing 60S pre-ribosome. One of the ATPases is a dynein-like Rea1 protein made up of 6 different ATPase domains that form a ring structure. The ring structure is attached to a flexible tail that happens to have a MIDAS (Metal ion-dependent adhesion site) tip. The Rea1 interacts with the 60S pre-ribosome via its ring while two substrates, Ytm1 and Rsa1, interact with Rea1 through its MIDAS tip. The role of these substrates has not yet been defined. Both though, along with their interactions, are removed in the maturation process of the 60S pre-ribosome. The other two ATPases, Rix7 and Drg1 also function to remove assembly factors from the maturing 60S subunit. Helicases and GTPases are also involved in the removal of assembly factors and the rearrangement of RNA to form the completed 60S subunit. Once in the cytoplasm (see nuclear export), the 60S subunit further undergoes processing in order to be functional. The rest of the large subunit ribosomal particles associate with the 60S unit and the remaining non-ribosomal assembly factors disassociate. The release of the biogenesis factors is mediated mostly by GTPases such as Lsg1 and ATPases such as Drg1. The precise sequence of these events remains unclear. The pathway of 60S cytoplasmic maturation remains incomplete as far as current knowledge is concerned.

== Nuclear export ==
In order for the pre-ribosomal units to fully mature, they must be exported to the cytoplasm. To effectively move from the nucleolus to the cytoplasm, the pre-ribosomes interact with export receptors to move through the hydrophobic central channel of the nuclear pore complex. The karyopherin Crm1 is the receptor for both ribosomal subunits and mediates export in a Ran-GTP dependent fashion. It recognizes molecules that have leucine-rich nuclear export signals. The Crm1 is pulled to the large 60S subunit by the help of an adapter protein called Nmd3. The adapter protein for the 40S unit is unknown. In addition to Crm1, other factors play a role in nuclear export of pre-ribosomes. A general mRNA export receptor, called Mex67, as well as a HEAT-repeating-containing protein, Rrp12, facilitate the export of both subunits. These factors are non-essential proteins and help to optimize the export of the pre-ribosomes since they are large molecules.

== Quality control ==
Because ribosomes are so complex, a certain number of ribosomes are assembled incorrectly and could potentially waste cellular energy and resources when synthesizing non-functional proteins. To prevent this, cells have an active surveillance system to recognize damaged or defective ribosomes and target them for degradation. The surveillance mechanism is in place to detect nonfunctional pre-ribosomes as well as nonfunctional mature ribosomes. In addition, the surveillance system brings the necessary degradation equipment and actually degrades the nonfunctional ribosomes. Pre-ribosomes that build up in the nucleus are destroyed by the exosome, which is a multisubunit complex with exonuclease activity. If defective ribosomal subunits do happen to make it out of the nucleolus and into the cytoplasm, there is a second surveillance system in place there to target malfunctioning ribosomes in the cytoplasm for degradation. Certain mutations in residues of the large ribosome subunit will actually result in RNA decay and thus degradation of the unit. Because the amount of defects that are possible in ribosome assembly are so extensive, it is still unknown as to how the surveillance system detects all defects, but it has been postulated that instead of targeting specific defects, the surveillance system recognizes the consequences of those defects – such as assembly delays. Meaning, if there is a disruption in the assembly or maturation of a mature ribosome, the surveillance system will act as if the subunit is defective.

== Human disease ==
Mutations in ribosome biogenesis are linked to several human ribosomopathy genetic diseases, including inherited bone marrow failure syndromes, which are characterized by a predisposition to cancer and a reduced number of blood cells. Ribosomal dysregulation may also play a role in muscle wasting.

== See also ==
- RNA polymerase
