= List of airports in North Dakota =

This is a list of airports in North Dakota (a U.S. state), grouped by type and sorted by location. It contains all public-use and military airports in the state of North Dakota. Some private-use and former airports may be included where notable, such as airports that were previously public-use, those with commercial enplanements recorded by the FAA or airports assigned an IATA airport code.

== Airports ==
This list contains the following information:

- **City served** – The city generally associated with the airport, as per the airport's master record with the Federal Aviation Administration. This is not always the actual location since some airports are located in smaller towns outside of the city they serve. It is not meant to be a complete list of cities served, which can be found in or added to each airport's Wikipedia article.
- **FAA** – The location identifier assigned by the Federal Aviation Administration (FAA). These are linked to each airport's page at the North Dakota Aeronautics Commission Airport Directory.
- **IATA** – The airport code assigned by the International Air Transport Association (IATA). Those that do not match the FAA code are shown in bold.
- **ICAO** – The location indicator assigned by the International Civil Aviation Organization (ICAO).
- **Airport name** – The official airport name. Those shown in **bold** indicate the airport has scheduled passenger service on commercial airlines.
- **Role** – One of four FAA airport categories, as per the 2023–2027 National Plan of Integrated Airport Systems (NPIAS) report released September 2022:
  - P-s: Commercial service – primary are publicly owned airports that receive scheduled passenger service and have more than 10,000 passenger boardings (enplanements) each year. Each primary airport is sub-classified by the FAA as one of the following four "hub" types (s):
    - L: Large hub that accounts for at least 1% of total U.S. passenger enplanements.
    - M: Medium hub that accounts for between 0.25% and 1% of total U.S. passenger enplanements.
    - S: Small hub that accounts for between 0.05% and 0.25% of total U.S. passenger enplanements.
    - N: Nonhub that accounts for less than 0.05% of total U.S. passenger enplanements, but more than 10,000 annual enplanements.
  - CS: Commercial service – nonprimary are publicly owned airports that receive scheduled passenger service and have at least 2,500 passenger boardings each year.
  - R: Reliever airports are designated by the FAA to relieve congestion at a large commercial service airport and to provide more general aviation access to the overall community.
  - GA: General aviation airports are the largest single group of airports in the U.S. airport system. They are public-use airports that do not have scheduled service or have scheduled service with less than 2,500 passenger boardings each year.
- **Enplanements** – The number of enplanements (commercial passenger boardings) that occurred at the airport in calendar year 2024, as per FAA records released October 2025.

| City served | FAA | IATA | ICAO | Airport name | Role | Enplanements (2024) |
|---|---|---|---|---|---|---|
| | | | | **Commercial service – primary airports** | | |
| Bismarck | BIS | BIS | KBIS | **Bismarck Municipal Airport** | P-N | 295,900 |
| Dickinson | DIK | DIK | KDIK | **Dickinson Theodore Roosevelt Regional Airport** | P-N | 26,146 |
| Fargo | FAR | FAR | KFAR | **Hector International Airport** | P-S | 552,860 |
| Grand Forks | GFK | GFK | KGFK | **Grand Forks International Airport** | P-N | 92,482 |
| Jamestown | JMS | JMS | KJMS | **Jamestown Regional Airport** | P-N | 9,516 |
| Minot | MOT | MOT | KMOT | **Minot International Airport** | P-N | 169,463 |
| Williston | XWA | XWA | KXWA | **Williston Basin International Airport** | P-N | 99,735 |
| | | | | **Commercial service – nonprimary airports** | | |
| Devils Lake | DVL | DVL | KDVL | **Devils Lake Regional Airport** (Knoke Field) | CS | 9,488 |
| | | | | **General aviation airports** | | |
| Ashley | ASY | ASY | KASY | Ashley Municipal Airport | GA | 0 |
| Beach | 20U | | | Beach Airport | GA | 0 |
| Bottineau | D09 | | | Bottineau Municipal Airport | GA | 0 |
| Bowman | BWW | BWM | KBWW | Bowman Regional Airport | GA | 0 |
| Cando | 9D7 | | | Cando Municipal Airport | GA | 0 |
| Carrington | 46D | | | Carrington Municipal Airport | GA | 0 |
| Casselton | 5N8 | | | Casselton Robert Miller Regional Airport | GA | 0 |
| Cavalier | 2C8 | | | Cavalier Municipal Airport | GA | 0 |
| Cooperstown | S32 | | | Cooperstown Municipal Airport | GA | 0 |
| Crosby | D50 | | | Crosby Municipal Airport | GA | 0 |
| Dunseith | S28 | | | International Peace Garden Airport | GA | 0 |
| Edgeley | 51D | | | Edgeley Municipal Airport | GA | 0 |
| Ellendale | 4E7 | | | Ellendale Municipal Airport | GA | 0 |
| Fort Yates | Y27 | | | Standing Rock Airport | GA | 0 |
| Garrison | D05 | | | Garrison Municipal Airport | GA | 0 |
| Glen Ullin | D57 | | | Glen Ullin Regional Airport | GA | 0 |
| Grafton | GAF | | KGAF | Hutson Field | GA | 0 |
| Gwinner | GWR | GWR | KGWR | Gwinner-Roger Melroe Field | GA | 0 |
| Harvey | 5H4 | | | Harvey Municipal Airport | GA | 0 |
| Hazen | HZE | | KHZE | Mercer County Regional Airport | GA | 0 |
| Hettinger | HEI | | KHEI | Hettinger/J.B. Lindquist Regional Airport | GA | 0 |
| Hillsboro | 3H4 | | | Hillsboro Municipal Airport | GA | 0 |
| Kenmare | 7K5 | | | Kenmare Municipal Airport | GA | 0 |
| Kindred | K74 | | | Robert Odegaard Field | GA | 0 |
| Lakota | 5L0 | | | Lakota Municipal Airport | GA | 0 |
| LaMoure | 4F9 | | | LaMoure Rott Municipal Airport | GA | 0 |
| Langdon | D55 | | | Robertson Field | GA | 0 |
| Linton | 7L2 | | | Linton Municipal Airport | GA | 0 |
| Lisbon | 6L3 | | | Lisbon Municipal Airport | GA | 0 |
| Mandan | Y19 | | | Mandan Regional Airport (Lawler Field) | GA | 0 |
| Mohall | HBC | | KHBC | Mohall Municipal Airport | GA | 0 |
| Mott | 3P3 | | | Mott Municipal Airport | GA | 0 |
| Northwood | 4V4 | | | Northwood Municipal Airport (Vince Field) | GA | 0 |
| Oakes | 2D5 | | | Oakes Municipal Airport | GA | 0 |
| Park River | Y37 | | | Park River Airport (W.C. Skjerven Field) | GA | 0 |
| Parshall | Y74 | | | Parshall-Hankins Airport | GA | 0 |
| Pembina | PMB | PMB | KPMB | Pembina Municipal Airport | GA | 0 |
| Rolla | 06D | | | Rolla Municipal Airport | GA | 0 |
| Rugby | RUG | | KRUG | Rugby Municipal Airport | GA | 0 |
| Stanley | 08D | | | Stanley Municipal Airport | GA | 0 |
| Tioga | D60 | VEX | | Tioga Municipal Airport | GA | 0 |
| Valley City | BAC | | KBAC | Barnes County Municipal Airport | GA | 0 |
| Wahpeton | BWP | WAH | KBWP | Harry Stern Airport | GA | 0 |
| Walhalla | 96D | | | Walhalla Municipal Airport | GA | 0 |
| Washburn | 5C8 | | | Washburn Municipal Airport | GA | 0 |
| Watford City | S25 | | | Watford City Municipal Airport | GA | 11 |
| | | | | **Other public-use airports** (not listed in NPIAS) | | |
| Arthur | 1A2 | | | Arthur Airport | | |
| Beulah | 95D | | | Beulah Airport | | |
| Bowbells | 5B4 | | | Bowbells Municipal Airport | | |
| Columbus | D49 | | | Columbus Municipal Airport | | |
| Drayton | D29 | | | Drayton Municipal Airport | | |
| Elgin | Y71 | | | Elgin Municipal Airport | | |
| Enderlin | 5N4 | | | Sky Haven Airport | | |
| Fargo | D54 | | | West Fargo Municipal Airport | | |
| Fessenden | D24 | | | Fessenden-Streibel Municipal Airport | | |
| Gackle | 9G9 | | | Gackle Municipal Airport | | |
| Hazelton | 6H8 | | | Hazelton Municipal Airport | | |
| Killdeer | 9Y1 | | | Dunn County Airport (Weydahl Field) | | |
| Kulm | D03 | | | Kulm Municipal Airport (opened 2009, replacing Pruetz Municipal) | | |
| Larimore | 2L1 | | | Larimore Municipal Airport | | |
| Leeds | D31 | | | Leeds Municipal Airport | | |
| Lidgerwood | 4N4 | | | Lidgerwood Municipal Airport | | |
| Maddock | 6D3 | | | Maddock Municipal Airport | | |
| Mayville | D56 | | | Mayville Municipal Airport | | |
| McClusky | 7G2 | | | McClusky Municipal Airport | | |
| McVille | 8M6 | | | McVille Municipal Airport | | |
| Milnor | 4R6 | | | Milnor Municipal Airport | | |
| Minto | D06 | | | Minto Municipal Airport | | |
| Napoleon | 5B5 | | | Napoleon Municipal Airport | | |
| New Rockford | 8J7 | | | Tomlinson Field | | |
| New Town | 05D | | | New Town Municipal Airport | | |
| Page | 64G | | | Page Regional Airport | | |
| Plaza | Y99 | | | Trulson Field | | |
| Richardton | 4E8 | | | Richardton Airport | | |
| Riverdale | 37N | | | Garrison Dam Recreational Airpark | | |
| Rolette | 2H9 | | | Rolette Airport | | |
| St. Thomas | 4S5 | | | St. Thomas Municipal Airport | | |
| Towner | D61 | | | Towner Municipal Airport | | |
| Turtle Lake | 91N | | | Turtle Lake Municipal Airport | | |
| Westhope | D64 | | | Westhope Municipal Airport | | |
| Wishek | 6L5 | | | Wishek Municipal Airport | | |
| | | | | **Other military airports** | | |
| Grand Forks | RDR | RDR | KRDR | Grand Forks Air Force Base | | |
| Minot | MIB | MIB | KMIB | Minot Air Force Base | | 1,189 |
| | | | | **Notable former airports** | | |
| Bowman | ~~BPP~~ | ~~BWM~~ | ~~KBPP~~ | Bowman Municipal Airport (closed in 2015, replaced by Bowman Regional Airport) | ~~GA~~ | |
| Grenora | ~~7N6~~ | | | Grenora Centennial Airport | | |
| Kulm | ~~5K9~~ | | | Pruetz Municipal Airport (closed in 2009, replaced by Kulm Municipal) | | |
| Williston | ~~ISN~~ | ~~ISN~~ | ~~KISN~~ | Sloulin Field International Airport (closed in 2019, replaced by Williston Basin) | ~~P-N~~ | |
| Wimbledon | | | | Wimbledon Airport (closed 2001-2003) | | |

== See also ==
- Essential Air Service
- North Dakota World War II Army Airfields
- Wikipedia:WikiProject Aviation/Airline destination lists: North America#North Dakota

== Bibliography ==
Federal Aviation Administration (FAA):

- FAA Airport Data (Form 5010) from National Flight Data Center (NFDC), also available from AirportIQ 5010
- National Plan of Integrated Airport Systems for 2017–2021, updated September 2016
- Passenger Boarding (Enplanement) Data for CY 2016, updated October 2017

State:

- North Dakota Aeronautics Commission: Airport Directory

Other sites used as a reference when compiling and updating this list:

- Aviation Safety Network – used to check IATA airport codes
- Great Circle Mapper: Airports in North Dakota – used to check IATA and ICAO airport codes
- Abandoned & Little-Known Airfields: North Dakota – used for information on former airports
