= Aviation in North Dakota =

- Aviation in the United States
- North Dakota State Flag

Airports
- Commercial – primary: 5
- Commercial – non-primary: 3
- General aviation: 45
- Other public-use airports: 37
- Military and other airports: 2

First flight
- 19 July 1910

Aviation in North Dakota takes place around the state's 89 public airfields, including 8 commercial airports. Notable North Dakota aviators include Carl Ben Eielson, Bruce Peterson, and James Buchli.

North Dakota's first aeronautical event was the flight of a Wright Model B on July 19, 1910, at the Grand Forks Air Meet flown by Wright Exhibition Team member Archibald Hoxsey.

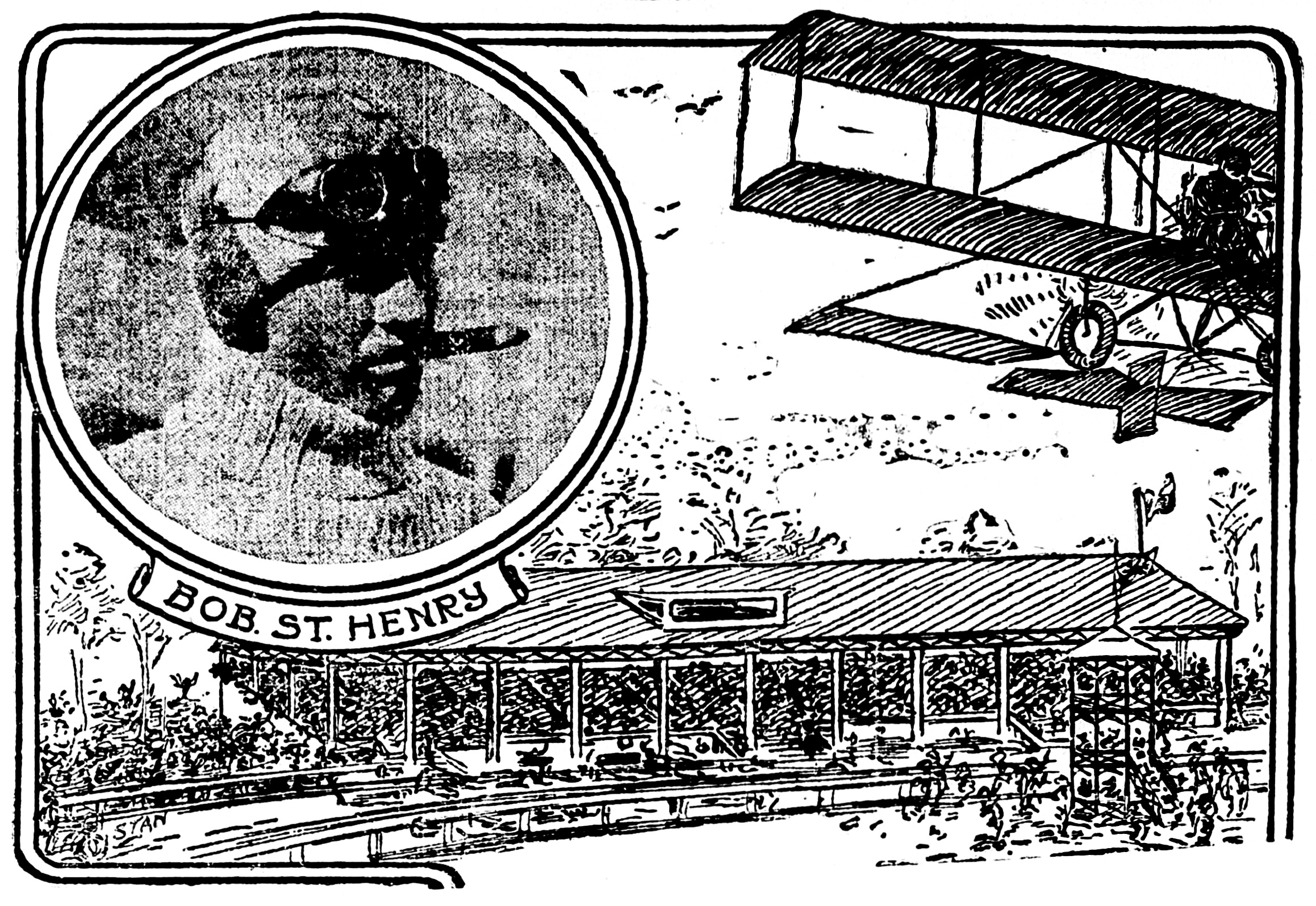
Lucky Bob and a drawing of his airplane, 1911.

== Events ==
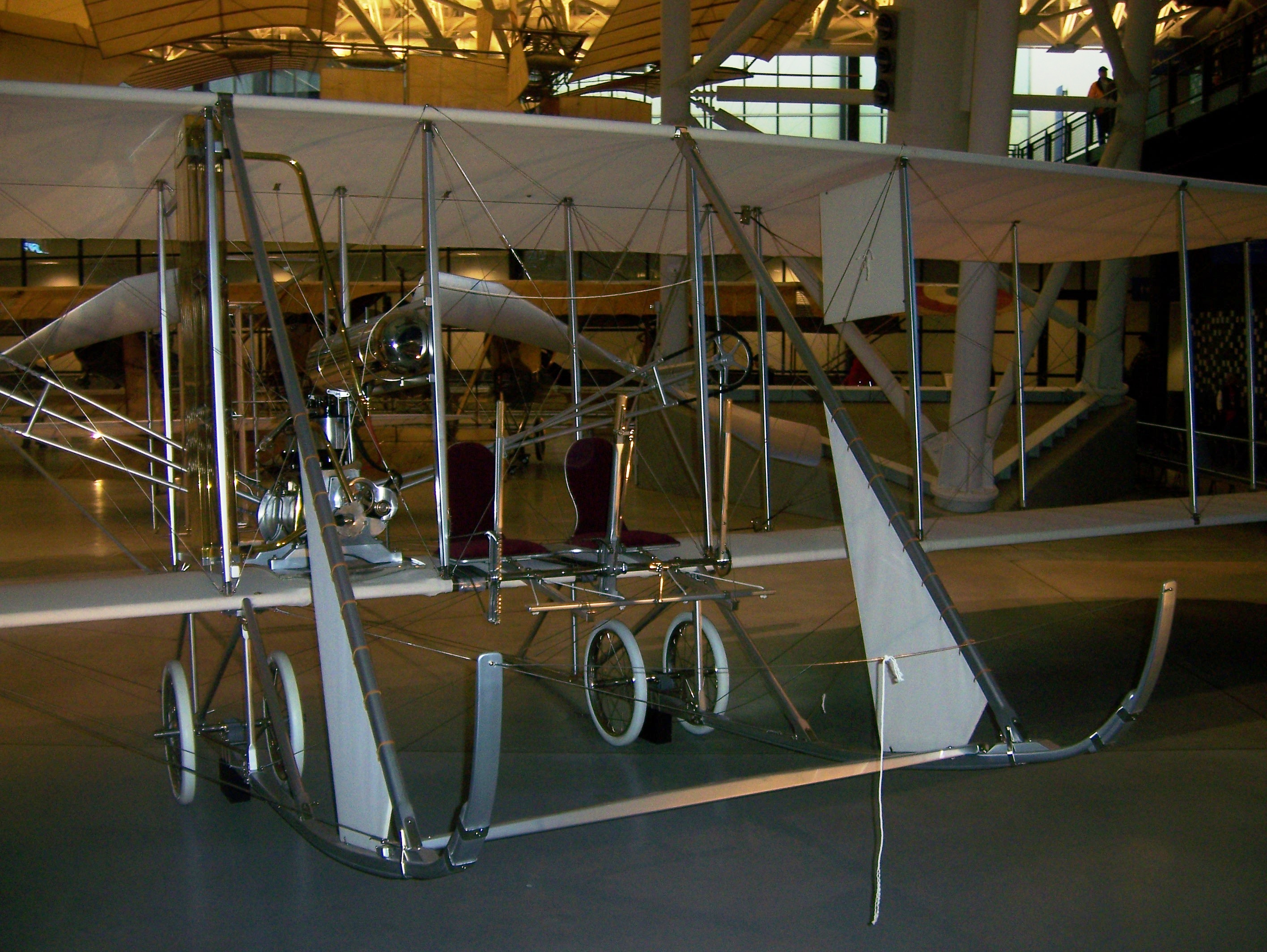
A Wright Model B on display

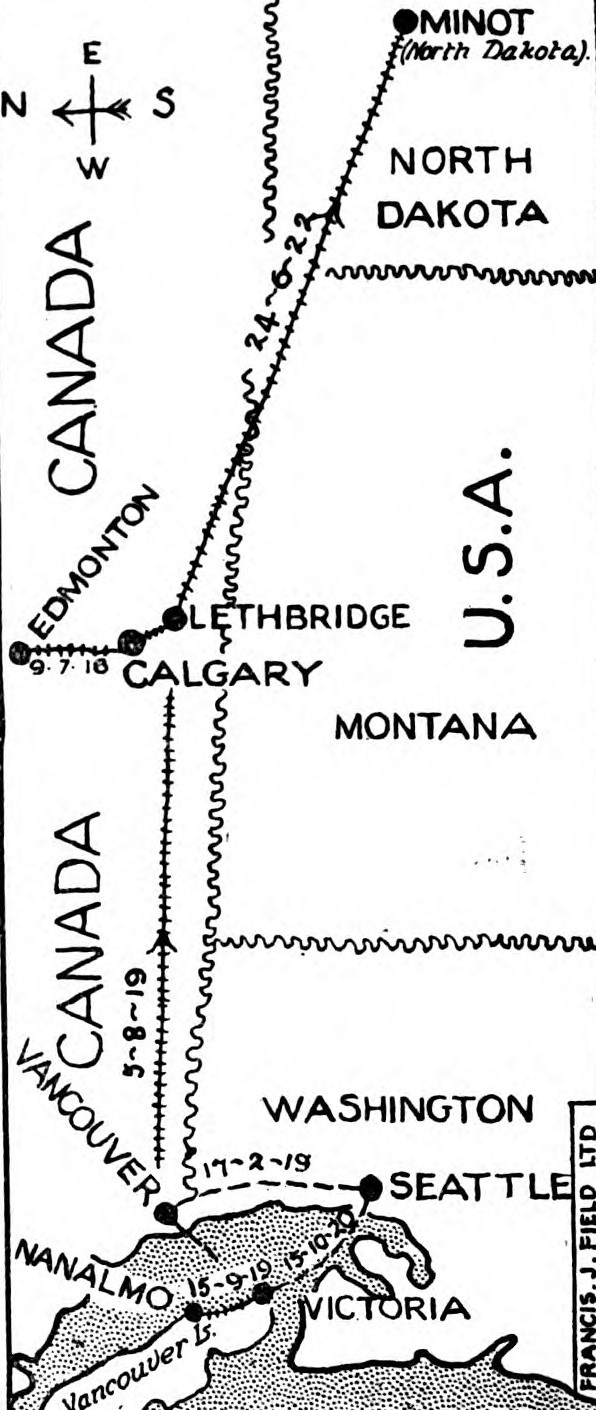
- North Dakota air route of 1925
  June 9, 1911, a Curtiss Biplane named "Sweetheart" flew at the Fargo Fairgrounds before an audience of 12,000 spectators piloted by Robert "Lucky Bob" St. Henry
- July 12, 1911 Thomas McGoey flies the first North Dakota designed and built aircraft, the Kenworthy-McGoey flying machine at Grand Forks.
- July 1916 Bismarck, North Dakota, has its first flight.
- 1928 North Dakota native Carl Ben Eielson, along with Hubert Wilkins become the first men to fly across the Arctic Ocean.
- 1990 Three crew members of a Northwest Airlines flight are sentenced to jail for flying while drunk from Fargo to Minneapolis.

== Aerospace Industry ==
=== Aircraft Manufacturers ===
- Cirrus Aircraft, Grand Forks, North Dakota
- 1911-1911 Kenworthy-McGoey Aviation Company. Founded to produce and demonstrate aircraft.
- The Boughton Flying Machine Corporation lost its prototype in 1916.

=== Components ===
- Northrop Grumman, New Town, North Dakota
- Goodrich Corporation, Jamestown, North Dakota
- Ideal Aerosmith, Grand Forks, North Dakota
- Appareo Systems, Fargo, North Dakota

== Flight Schools ==
- The John D. Odegard School of Aerospace Sciences at the University of North Dakota is one of the largest civilian flight training operations in the country.

== Airports ==
- List of airports in North Dakota

=== Commercial Service ===
- Bismarck Municipal Airport
- Hector International Airport, Fargo
- Grand Forks International Airport
- Williston Basin International Airport (Note: Replaced Sloulin Field International Airport in 2019 as Williston's airport.)
- Dickinson Theodore Roosevelt Regional Airport
- Minot International Airport
- Devils Lake Regional Airport
- Jamestown Regional Airport

== People ==
- James Buchli, born in Fargo, flew aboard four Space Shuttle missions.

== Organizations ==
- The North Dakota Aviation Council comprises six organizations promoting aviation in North Dakota.

== Government and Military ==
- All flight operations in North Dakota are conducted within FAA oversight.
- The North Dakota Air National Guard was activated on 16 January 1947 with the formation of the 178th Fighter squadron, 178th utility flight, 178th weather station, and detachment B of the 233rd Air service group.

== Museums ==
- Bonanzaville, USA Eagles hangar features a range of aircraft.
- The Dakota Territory Air Museum in Minot was founded in 1986.
- The Fargo Air Museum in Fargo, features flying examples of World War II aircraft.

== Gallery ==
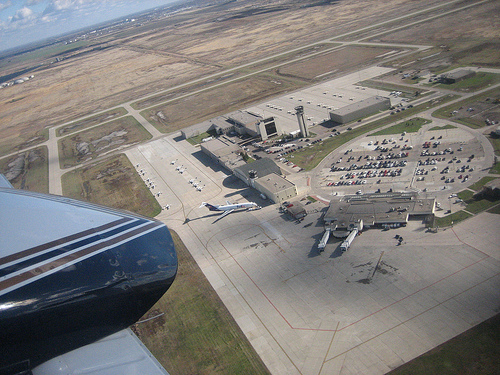
Grand Forks Airport

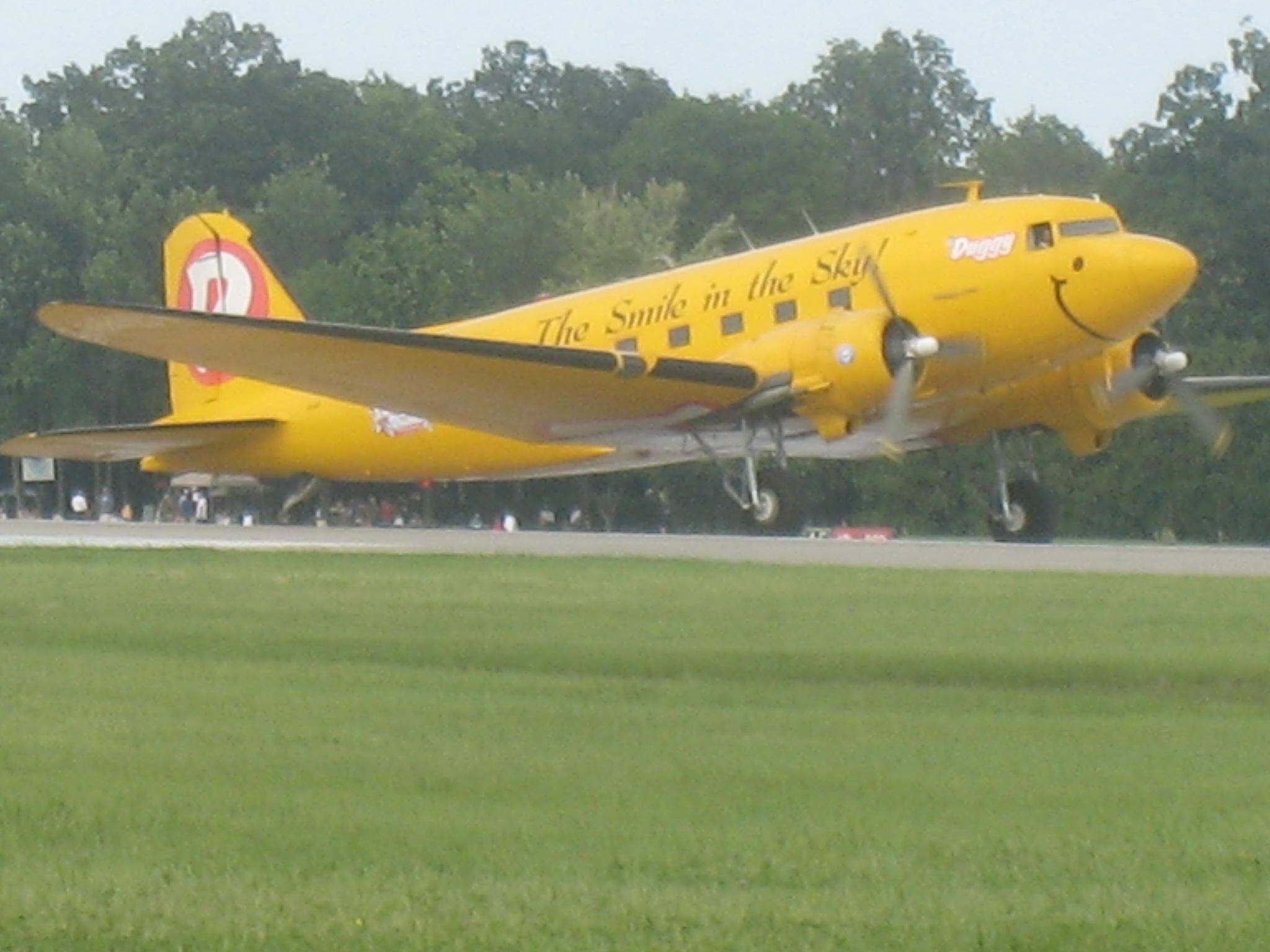
Fargo Air Museum's Duggy
