= Bottineau =

Bottineau may refer to:

- Pierre Bottineau (1817–1895), a Minnesota frontiersman
- Bottineau, North Dakota, U.S.
  - Bottineau County, North Dakota
  - Bottineau Municipal Airport
- Bottineau, Minneapolis, U.S.
  - Metro Blue Line Extension (Minnesota), formerly known as the Bottineau LRT
- USS Bottineau (APA-235), an American World War II ship
