= Cooperstown Airport =

Cooperstown Airport may refer to:

- Cooperstown Municipal Airport in Cooperstown, North Dakota, United States
- Cooperstown-Westville Airport in Cooperstown, New York, United States
