= Cando =

Cando may refer to:

== People ==
- Cando López, Cuban baseball player
- Catherine Cando, Ecuadorean beauty queen
- Charles Lamarque-Cando, French politician

== Places ==
- Cando, North Dakota, United States
  - Cando School District
  - Cando Municipal Airport
- Cando, Saskatchewan, Canada
- Cando, Spain

== Other ==
- Cando (river), in San Marino
- Cando Rail & Terminals, Canadian railroad services company
