= D49 =

D49 may refer to:

- Columbus Municipal Airport (North Dakota)
- D49 motorway (Czech Republic)
- D49 road (Croatia)
- Falcon School District 49, in Colorado
- Kyrie in D minor, D 49 (Schubert)
- LNER Class D49, a 1927 British class of 4-4-0 steam locomotives
- Semi-Slav Defense, a chess opening
