= Arthur Airport (disambiguation) =

Arthur Airport may refer to:

- Arthur Airport in Arthur, North Dakota, United States (1A2)
- Arthur Municipal Airport in Arthur, Nebraska, United States (38V)
- Arthur (Walter's Field) Aerodrome in Arthur, Ontario, Canada (TC: CPC3)
