= Robertson Field =

Robertson Field may refer to:

Airports:

- Robertson Field (Connecticut) in Plainville, Connecticut, United States (FAA: 4B8)
- Robertson Field (North Dakota) in Langdon, North Dakota, United States (FAA: D55)
- Robertson Airfield in Robertson, Western Cape South Africa (ICAO: FARS)

Stadiums:

- Hal Robertson Field at Phillip Satow Stadium in New York, New York, United States
