= D55 =

D55 may refer to:

- roads in various countries:
  - D55 road (Croatia), a state route in Croatia
  - D55 motorway in the Czech Republic
- HMAS Parramatta (D-55), a 1910 River class torpedo boat destroyer from the Australian Navy
- two ships of the Royal Navy :
  - HMS Smiter (D55), a 1943 Bogue-class auxiliary aircraft carrier
  - HMS Finisterre (D55), a Battle-class destroyer
- INS Ranvijay (D55), a 1988 Rajput class destroyer from the Indian Navy
- CIE Standard Illuminant D55, a lighting standard used in colorimetry

and also:

- Robertson Field (North Dakota) FAA code
- New South Wales D55 class locomotive, a NSWGR steam locomotive
