= St. Thomas Airport =

St. Thomas Airport may refer to:

- Cyril E. King Airport on the island of St. Thomas in the United States Virgin Islands
- St. Thomas Municipal Airport (North Dakota) in St. Thomas, North Dakota, United States
- St. Thomas Municipal Airport (Ontario) in St. Thomas, Ontario, Canada
