= Jamestown Airport =

Jamestown Airport may refer to:

- Jamestown Regional Airport (IATA: JMS, ICAO: KJMS) near Jamestown, North Dakota
- Chautauqua County-Jamestown Airport (IATA: JHW, ICAO: KJHW) near Jamestown, New York
