= Kenmare Municipal Airport =

Airport in North Dakota, United States

- IATA: none; ICAO: none; FAA LID: 7K5

Summary
- Airport type: Public
- Owner: Kenmare Airport Authority
- Serves: Kenmare, North Dakota
- Elevation AMSL: 1,962 ft (598 m)
- Coordinates: 48°40′03″N 102°02′51″W

Map
- Location within North Dakota Location within the United States

Runways
| Direction | Length | | Surface |
| Direction | ft | m | Surface |
|---|---|---|---|
| 8/26 | 3,700 | 1,128 | Asphalt |

Statistics (2021)
- Aircraft operations (year ending 8/31/2021): 3,950
- Based aircraft: 29
- Source: Federal Aviation Administration

Kenmare Municipal Airport (FAA LID: 7K5) is a mile southeast of Kenmare, in Ward County, North Dakota. The National Plan of Integrated Airport Systems for 2011–2015 categorized it as a general aviation facility.

== Facilities ==
The airport covers 158 acres (64 ha) at an elevation of 1,962 feet (598 m). Its single runway, 8/26, is 3,700 by 60 feet (1,128 x 18 m).

In the year ending August 31, 2021, the airport had 3,950 aircraft operations, average 76 per week: 91% general aviation, 8% air taxi, and 1% military. 29 aircraft were then based at this airport: all single-engine.

== See also ==
- List of airports in North Dakota
