= Page Regional Airport =

Airport in North Dakota, United States

- IATA: none; ICAO: none; FAA LID: 64G

Summary
- Airport type: Public use
- Owner: Tim McPherson
- Serves: Page, North Dakota
- Elevation AMSL: 1,218 ft / 371 m
- Coordinates: 47°10′13″N 097°28′55″W

Map
- Location of airport in North Dakota 64G (the United States)

Runways
Direction	Length		Surface
Direction	ft	m	Surface
17/35	2,600	792	Asphalt

Statistics (2022)
- Aircraft operations (year ending 7/27/2022): 4,150
- Based aircraft: 11
- Source: Federal Aviation Administration

Page Regional Airport (FAA LID: 64G) is a privately owned, public use airport located four nautical miles (5 mi, 7 km) east of the central business district of Page, a city in Cass County, North Dakota, United States.

== Facilities and aircraft ==
Page Regional Airport covers an area of 26 acres (11 ha) at an elevation of 1,218 feet (371 m) above mean sea level. It has one runway designated 17/35 with an asphalt surface measuring 2,600 by 30 feet (792 x 9 m).

For the 12-month period ending July 27, 2022, the airport had 4,150 aircraft operations, an average of 80 per week: 96% general aviation, 2% military, and 1% air taxi. At that time there were 11 aircraft based at this airport: 10 single-engine and 1 multi-engine.

== See also ==
- List of airports in North Dakota
