= Oakes Municipal Airport =

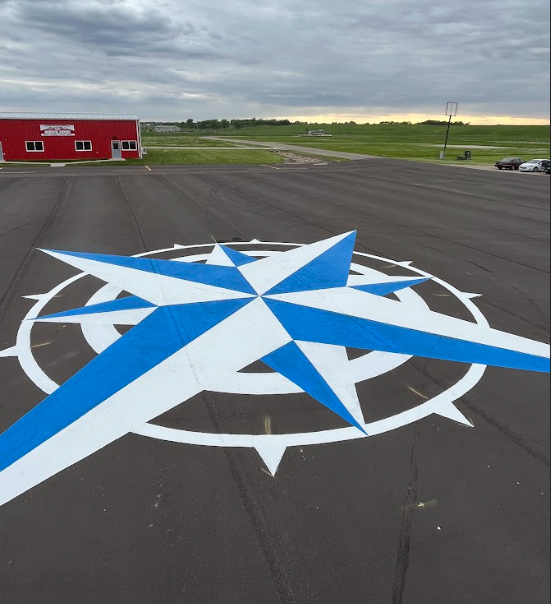
- IATA: none; ICAO: none; FAA LID: 2D5

Summary
- Airport type: Public
- Owner: Oakes Airport Authority
- Location: Oakes, North Dakota
- Elevation AMSL: 1,335 ft / 407 m
- Coordinates: 46°10′23″N 098°04′48″W
- Interactive map of Oakes Municipal Airport

Runways
| Direction | Length | | Surface |
| Direction | ft | m | Surface |
|---|---|---|---|
| 12/30 | 3,500 | 1,067 | Asphalt |
| 17/35 | 2,000 | 610 | Turf |

Statistics (1997)
- Aircraft operations: 2,910
- Source: Federal Aviation Administration

Oakes Municipal Airport (FAA LID: 2D5) is a public airport located 2.5 miles (4 km) north of the central business district of Oakes, a city in Dickey County, North Dakota, United States. It is owned by the Oakes Airport Authority.

== Facilities and aircraft ==
Oakes Municipal Airport covers an area of 99 acres (40 ha) which contains two runways: 12/30 with an asphalt surface measuring 3,500 by 60 feet (1,067 x 18 m) and 17/35 with a turf surface measuring 2,000 by 200 feet (610 x 61 m).

For the 12-month period ending November 3, 1997, the airport had 2,910 aircraft operations: 96% general aviation, 3% air taxi and <1% military.

== Notable Features ==
A Compass rose is centered on the main ramp, oriented True north (360T/000T) The airport also features a 1956 North American F-100 Super Sabre, displayed at the entrance to the airport.

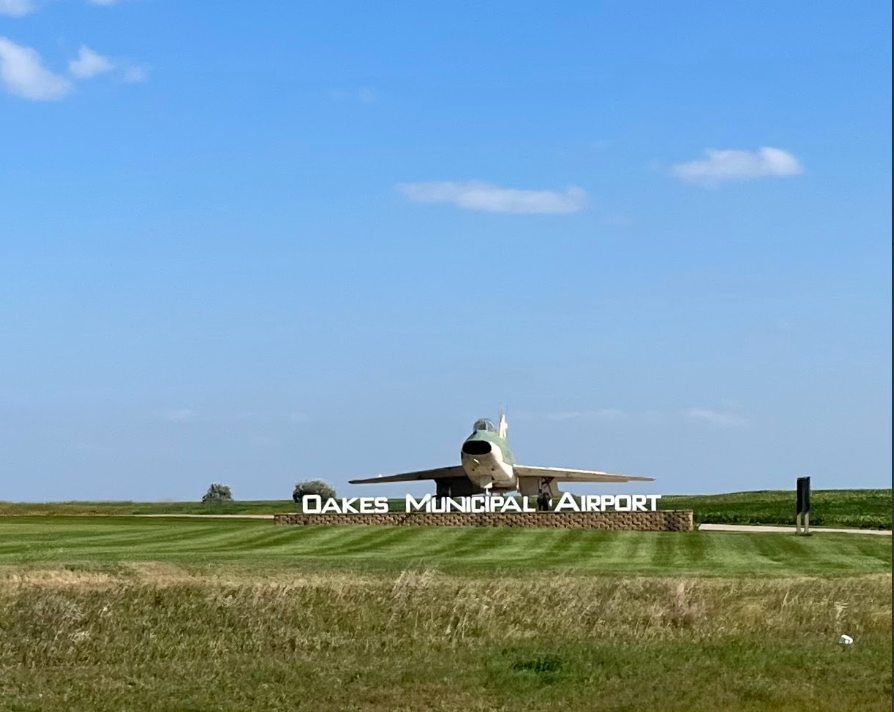
F-100 Oakes Municipal Airport

== See also ==
- List of airports in North Dakota
