= Gwinner–Roger Melroe Field =

Airport in North Dakota, United States

- IATA: none; ICAO: KGWR; FAA LID: GWR

Summary
- Airport type: Public
- Owner: Gwinner Airport Authority
- Serves: Gwinner, North Dakota
- Elevation AMSL: 1,266 ft (386 m)
- Coordinates: 46°13′07″N 097°38′37″W

Map
- Location of airport in North Dakota GWR (the United States)

Runways
Direction	Length		Surface
Direction	ft	m	Surface
16/34	4,986	1,520	Asphalt
6/24	2,950	899	Turf

Statistics (2007)
- Aircraft operations: 4,120
- Based aircraft: 13
- Source: Federal Aviation Administration

Gwinner–Roger Melroe Field (ICAO: KGWR, FAA LID: GWR) is a public use airport located one nautical mile (2 km) southeast of the central business district of Gwinner, a city in Sargent County, North Dakota, United States. It is owned by the Gwinner Airport Authority. It is also referred to as Gwinner Municipal Airfield.

The field is named for Roger Melroe of the Melroe Company in Gwinner, the company that developed the "Bobcat" brand skid-steer loader.

== History ==
In 1967, the Gwinner Municipal Airport Authority proposed to construct a new municipal airport, which was completed in 1969. At the time it had a 3,600 foot lighted asphalt runway and an unlighted 2,500 foot turf strip. In 1975 the asphalt runway was extended from to 5000 feet in length. The airport was rededicated "Roger Melroe Field" in 1986.

== Facilities and aircraft ==
The airport covers an area of 120 acres (49 ha) at an elevation of 1,266 feet (386 m) above mean sea level. It has two runways: 16/34 is 4,986 by 60 feet (1,520 x 18 m) with an asphalt pavement; 6/24 is 2,950 by 100 feet (899 x 30 m) with a turf surface.

For the 12-month period ending December 31, 2007, the airport had 4,120 aircraft operations, an average of 11 per day: 51% air taxi, 49% general aviation, <1% military. At that time there were 13 aircraft based at this airport: 85% single-engine and 15% multi-engine.

== See also ==
- List of airports in North Dakota
