= Kulm Municipal Airport =

Airport in North Dakota, United States

- IATA: none; ICAO: none; FAA LID: D03

Summary
- Airport type: Public
- Owner: Kulm Municipal Airport Authority
- Serves: Kulm, North Dakota
- Opened: January 10, 2009
- Elevation AMSL: 1,959 ft (597 m)
- Coordinates: 46°18′24″N 098°56′20″W

Map
- Interactive map of Kulm Municipal Airport

Runways
Direction	Length		Surface
Direction	ft	m	Surface
12/30	2,800	853	Turf
- Source: Federal Aviation Administration

Kulm Municipal Airport (FAA LID: D03) is a public use airport located one nautical mile (1.85 km) northeast of the central business district of Kulm, a city in LaMoure County, North Dakota, United States. It is owned by the Kulm Municipal Airport Authority.

== Facilities and aircraft ==
The airport covers an area of 22 acres (8.9 ha) at an elevation of 1,959 feet (597 m) above mean sea level. It has one runway designated 12/30 with a turf surface measuring 2,800 by 120 feet (853 x 37 m).

== Pruetz Municipal Airport (5K9) ==
Kulm Municipal Airport opened in 2009, replacing the former Pruetz Municipal Airport (FAA LID: 5K9), which had a 2,900 by 110 ft (884 x 34 m) turf runway located south of Kulm at 46°17′20″N 098°56′31″W.

== See also ==
- List of airports in North Dakota
