= McClusky Municipal Airport =

Airport near McClusky, North Dakota

- IATA: none; ICAO: none; FAA LID: 7G2

Summary
- Airport type: Public
- Owner: McClusky Airport Authority
- Serves: McClusky, North Dakota
- Elevation AMSL: 1,900 ft / 579 m
- Coordinates: 47°27′44″N 100°29′14″W
- Interactive map of McClusky Municipal Airport

Runways
Direction	Length		Surface
Direction	ft	m	Surface
13/31	3,100	945	Turf

Statistics (1998)
- Aircraft operations: 510
- Source: Federal Aviation Administration

McClusky Municipal Airport (FAA LID: 7G2) is a public airport located two miles (3.2 km) southwest of the central business district of McClusky, North Dakota, in Sheridan County, North Dakota, United States. It is owned by the McClusky Municipal Airport Authority.

== Facilities and aircraft ==
McClusky Municipal Airport covers an area of 320 acres (130 ha) which contains one runway designated 13/31 with a 3,100 by 80 ft (945 x 24 m) turf surface.

For the 12-month period ending February 10, 1998, the airport had 510 aircraft operations: 98% general aviation and 2% air taxi.

== See also ==
- List of airports in North Dakota
