= Ashley Municipal Airport =

- IATA: ASY; ICAO: KASY; FAA LID: ASY

Summary
- Airport type: Public
- Owner: Ashley Municipal Airport Authority
- Serves: Ashley, North Dakota
- Elevation AMSL: 2,034 ft (620 m)
- Coordinates: 46°01′29″N 099°21′06″W

Map
- Location of airport in North Dakota ASY (the United States)

Runways
Direction	Length		Surface
Direction	ft	m	Surface
14/32	4,364	1,330	Asphalt

Statistics (2023)
- Aircraft operations (year ending 4/26/2023): 5,000
- Based aircraft: 13
- Source: Federal Aviation Administration

Ashley Municipal Airport (IATA: ASY, ICAO: KASY, FAA LID: ASY) is a public use airport located one nautical mile (2 km) southeast of the central business district of Ashley, a city in McIntosh County, North Dakota, United States. It is owned by the Ashley Municipal Airport Authority.

== Facilities and aircraft ==
Ashley Municipal Airport covers an area of 127 acres (51 ha) at an elevation of 2,034 feet (620 m) above mean sea level. It has one runway: 14/32 is 4,364 by 60 feet (1,330 x 18 m) with an asphalt surface.

For the 12-month period ending April 26, 2023, the airport had 5,000 aircraft operations, an average of 96 per week: 90% general aviation, 4% air taxi, and 6% military. At that time there were 13 aircraft based at this airport, 12 single-engine, and 1 multi-engine.

== See also ==
- List of airports in North Dakota
