= Pembina Municipal Airport =

Airport in North Dakota, United States

- IATA: PMB; ICAO: KPMB; FAA LID: PMB

Summary
- Airport type: Public
- Owner: Pembina Airport Authority
- Serves: Pembina, North Dakota
- Elevation AMSL: 795 ft / 242 m
- Coordinates: 48°56′33″N 097°14′27″W

Map
- Location of airport in North Dakota PMB (the United States)

Runways
Direction	Length		Surface
Direction	ft	m	Surface
15/33	3,800	1,158	Asphalt

Statistics (2009)
- Aircraft operations: 1,500
- Based aircraft: 7
- Source: Federal Aviation Administration

Pembina Municipal Airport (IATA: PMB, ICAO: KPMB, FAA LID: PMB) is a public use airport located one nautical mile (2 km) south of the central business district of Pembina, a city in Pembina County, North Dakota, United States. It is owned by the Pembina Airport Authority. This airport is included in the National Plan of Integrated Airport Systems for 2011–2015, which categorized it as a general aviation facility.

== Facilities and aircraft ==
Pembina Municipal Airport covers an area of 225 acres (91 ha) at an elevation of 795 feet (242 m) above mean sea level. It has one runway designated 15/33 with an asphalt surface measuring 3,800 by 75 feet (1,158 x 23 m).

For the 12-month period ending May 31, 2009, the airport had 1,500 aircraft operations, an average of 125 per month: 80% general aviation, 13% air taxi, and 7% military. At that time there were 7 aircraft based at this airport: 86% single-engine and 14% glider.

== See also ==
- List of airports in North Dakota
