= Washburn Municipal Airport =

- IATA: none; ICAO: none; FAA LID: 5C8

Summary
- Airport type: Public
- Owner: Washburn Airport Authority
- Serves: Washburn, North Dakota
- Elevation AMSL: 1,905 ft / 581 m
- Coordinates: 47°21′11″N 101°01′39″W

Map

Runways
| Direction | Length | | Surface |
| Direction | ft | m | Surface |
|---|---|---|---|
| 8/26 | 3,700 | 1,128 | Concrete |
| 17/35 | 2,235 | 681 | Turf |

Statistics (2007)
- Aircraft operations: 1,700
- Source: Federal Aviation Administration

Washburn Municipal Airport (FAA LID: 5C8) is a public airport located four miles (6.5 km) north of the central business district of Washburn, in McLean County, North Dakota, United States. It is owned by the Washburn Airport Authority.

== Facilities and aircraft ==
Washburn Municipal Airport covers an area of 40 acres (16 ha) which contains two runways: 8/26 with a 3,700 by 60 ft (1,128 x 18 m) concrete surface and 17/35 with a 2,235 by 120 ft (681 x 37 m) turf surface.

For the 12-month period ending July 31, 2007, the airport had 1,700 aircraft operations: 76% general aviation, 18% air taxi, and 6% military.

== See also ==
- List of airports in North Dakota
