= Edgeley Municipal Airport =

- IATA: none; ICAO: none; FAA LID: 51D

Summary
- Airport type: Public
- Owner: Edgeley Municipal Airport Authority
- Serves: Edgeley, North Dakota
- Elevation AMSL: 1,601 ft (488 m)
- Coordinates: 46°20′55″N 98°44′05″W
- Interactive map of Edgeley Municipal Airport

Runways
Direction	Length		Surface
Direction	ft	m	Surface
14/32	3,600	1,097	Asphalt

Statistics (2000)
- Aircraft operations: 230
- Source: Federal Aviation Administration

Edgeley Municipal Airport (FAA LID: 51D) is a public airport located one mile (1.6 km) southwest of the central business district of Edgeley, in LaMoure County, North Dakota, United States. It is owned by the Edgeley Municipal Airport Authority.

== Facilities and aircraft ==
Edgeley Municipal Airport covers an area of 95 acres (38 ha) which contains one runway designated 14/32 with a 3,600 by 60 ft (1,097 x 18 m) asphalt surface.

For the 12-month period ending September 25, 2000, the airport had 230 aircraft operations: 87% general aviation, 9% air taxi, and 4% military.

== See also ==
- List of airports in North Dakota
