= Beach Airport =

- IATA: none; ICAO: none; FAA LID: 20U

Summary
- Airport type: Public
- Owner/Operator: Golden Valley County Airport Authority
- Serves: Beach, North Dakota
- Elevation AMSL: 2,756 ft (840 m)
- Coordinates: 46°55′31″N 103°58′55″W
- Interactive map of Beach Airport

Runways
| Direction | Length | | Surface |
| Direction | ft | m | Surface |
|---|---|---|---|
| 12/30 | 4,200 | 1,280 | Asphalt |

Statistics (2023)
- Aircraft operations (year ending 5/2/2023): 3,630
- Source: Federal Aviation Administration

Beach Airport (FAA LID: 20U) is a public airport located one mile (1.6 km) east-northeast of the central business district of Beach, in Golden Valley County, North Dakota, United States. It is owned by the Golden Valley County Airport Authority.

== Facilities and aircraft ==
Beach Airport covers an area of 175 acres (71 ha) which contains one runway designated 12/30 with an asphalt surface measuring 4,200 by 60 feet (1,280 x 18 m).

For the 12-month period ending May 2, 2023, the airport had 3,630 aircraft operations: 96% general aviation, 3% air taxi, and <1% military.

== See also ==
- List of airports in North Dakota
