= Parshall–Hankins Airport =

- IATA: none; ICAO: none; FAA LID: Y74

Summary
- Airport type: Public
- Owner: Parshall Airport Authority
- Serves: Parshall, North Dakota
- Elevation AMSL: 2,031 ft / 619 m
- Coordinates: 47°56′11″N 102°08′32″W
- Interactive map of Parshall–Hankins Airport

Runways
Direction	Length		Surface
Direction	ft	m	Surface
12/30	3,200	975	Asphalt

Statistics (2007)
- Aircraft operations: 1,260
- Based aircraft: 9
- Source: Federal Aviation Administration

Parshall–Hankins Airport (FAA LID: Y74) is a public use airport located one nautical mile (1.85 km) south of the central business district of Parshall, a city in Mountrail County, North Dakota, United States. It is owned by the Parshall Airport Authority. Parshall is located on the Fort Berthold Indian Reservation, home to the Mandan, Hidatsa, and Arikara Nation. According to the FAA's National Plan of Integrated Airport Systems for 2009–2013, it is categorized as a general aviation facility.

== Facilities and aircraft ==
Parshall–Hankins Airport covers an area of 176 acres (71 ha) at an elevation of 2,031 feet (619 m) above mean sea level. It has one runway designated 12/30 with an asphalt surface measuring 3,200 by 60 feet (975 x 18 m).

For the 12-month period ending December 31, 2007, the airport had 1,260 aircraft operations, an average of 105 per month: 95% general aviation, 4% air taxi, and 1% military. At that time there were 9 aircraft based at this airport, all single-engine.

== See also ==
- List of airports in North Dakota
