= Harry Stern Airport =

- IATA: WAH; ICAO: KBWP; FAA LID: BWP

Summary
- Airport type: Public
- Owner: Wahpeton Airport Authority
- Serves: Wahpeton, North Dakota
- Elevation AMSL: 968 ft (295 m)
- Coordinates: 46°14′39″N 096°36′26″W
- Interactive map of Harry Stern Airport

Runways
Direction	Length		Surface
Direction	ft	m	Surface
15/33	5,100	1,554	Asphalt
3/21	3,254	992	Turf

Statistics (2003)
- Aircraft operations: 10,860
- Based aircraft: 66
- Source: Federal Aviation Administration

Harry Stern Airport (IATA: WAH, ICAO: KBWP, FAA LID: BWP) is a public use airport in Richland County, North Dakota, United States. It is located one nautical mile (1.85 km) south of the central business district of Wahpeton, North Dakota and owned by the Wahpeton Airport Authority.

Although many U.S. airports use the same three-letter location identifier for the FAA and IATA, Enterprise Municipal Airport is assigned BWP by the FAA and WAH by the IATA (which assigned BWP to Bewani, Papua New Guinea).

== Facilities and aircraft ==
Harry Stern Airport covers an area of 585 acres (237 ha) at an elevation of 968 feet (295 m) above mean sea level. It has two runways: 15/33 is 5,100 by 75 feet (1,554 x 23 m) with a concrete surface; 3/21 is 3,254 by 150 feet (992 x 46 m) with a turf surface.

For the 12-month period ending December 3, 2003, the airport had 10,860 aircraft operations, an average of 29 per day: 92% general aviation and 7% air taxi and 1% military. At that time there were 66 aircraft based at this airport: 83% single-engine, 8% multi-engine, 1% helicopter and 8% military.

== See also ==
- List of airports in North Dakota
