= Hettinger J.B. Lindquist Regional Airport =

- IATA: none; ICAO: KHEI; FAA LID: HEI

Summary
- Airport type: Public
- Owner: Adams County Airport Authority
- Serves: Hettinger, North Dakota
- Elevation AMSL: 2,705 ft (824 m)
- Coordinates: 46°00′54″N 102°39′22″W
- Interactive map of Hettinger J.B. Lindquist Regional Airport

Runways
Direction	Length		Surface
Direction	ft	m	Surface
12/30	4,652	1,418	Asphalt
17/35	1,890	576	Turf

Statistics (2006)
- Aircraft operations: 2,830
- Based aircraft: 25
- Source: Federal Aviation Administration

Hettinger J.B. Lindquist Regional Airport (ICAO: KHEI, FAA LID: HEI) is a public use airport located in Adams County, North Dakota, United States and owned by the Adams County Airport Authority. The airport is one nautical mile (1.85 km) northwest of the central business district of Hettinger, North Dakota.

Although many U.S. airports use the same three-letter location identifier for the FAA and IATA, this airport is assigned HEI by the FAA but has no designation from the IATA (which assigned HEI to Heide-Büsum Airport in Heide, Germany).

== Facilities and aircraft ==
Hettinger J.B. Lindquist Regional Airport covers an area of 271 acres (110 ha) at an elevation of 2,705 feet (824 m) above mean sea level. It has two runways: 12/30 is 4,652 by 75 feet (1,418 x 23 m) with an asphalt surface; 17/35 is 1,890 by 100 feet (576 x 30 m) with a turf surface.

For the 12-month period ending July 20, 2006, the airport had 2,830 aircraft operations, an average of 235 per month: 88% general aviation, 11% air taxi and 1% military. At that time there were 25 aircraft based at this airport: 96% single-engine and 4% multi-engine.

== See also ==
- List of airports in North Dakota
