= Cavalier Municipal Airport =

Airport in North Dakota, United States

- IATA: none; ICAO: none; FAA LID: 2C8

Summary
- Airport type: Public
- Owner: Cavalier Airport Authority
- Serves: Cavalier, North Dakota
- Elevation AMSL: 892 ft (272 m)
- Coordinates: 48°47′02″N 97°37′55″W
- Interactive map of Cavalier Municipal Airport

Runways
Direction	Length		Surface
Direction	ft	m	Surface
16/34	3,299	1,006	Asphalt

Statistics (2022)
- Aircraft operations (year ending 9/28/2022): 6,450
- Source: Federal Aviation Administration

Cavalier Municipal Airport (FAA LID: 2C8) is a public airport located one mile (1.6 km) southwest of the central business district of Cavalier, in Pembina County, North Dakota, United States. It is owned by the Cavalier Airport Authority.

== Facilities and aircraft ==
Cavalier Municipal Airport covers an area of 140 acres (57 ha) which contains one runway designated 16/34 with a 3,299 by 60 ft (1,006 x 18 m) asphalt surface.

For the 12-month period ending September 28, 2022, the airport had 6,450 aircraft operations: 94% general aviation, 4% military, and 3% air taxi.

== See also ==
- List of airports in North Dakota
