= Rugby Municipal Airport =

Airport in North Dakota, US

- IATA: none; ICAO: KRUG; FAA LID: RUG

Summary
- Airport type: Public
- Owner: Rugby Airport Authority
- Serves: Rugby, North Dakota
- Elevation AMSL: 1,549 ft / 472 m
- Coordinates: 48°23′25″N 100°01′27″W

Map
- Location of airport in North Dakota RUG (the United States)

Runways
Direction	Length		Surface
Direction	ft	m	Surface
12/30	3,600	1,097	Asphalt

Statistics (2021)
- Aircraft operations (year ending 6/3/2021): 4,250
- Based aircraft: 12
- Source: Federal Aviation Administration

Rugby Municipal Airport (ICAO: KRUG, FAA LID: RUG) is a public use airport located two nautical miles (4 km) northwest of the central business district of Rugby, a city in Pierce County, North Dakota, United States. It is owned by the Rugby Airport Authority. This airport is included in the National Plan of Integrated Airport Systems for 2011–2015, which categorized it as a general aviation facility.

Although many U.S. airports use the same three-letter location identifier for the FAA and IATA, this airport is assigned RUG by the FAA but has no designation from the IATA (which assigned RUG to Rugao Air Base in Rugao, China).

== Facilities and aircraft ==
Rugby Municipal Airport covers an area of 280 acres (113 ha) at an elevation of 1,549 feet (472 m) above mean sea level. It has one runway designated 12/30 with an asphalt surface measuring 3,600 by 60 feet (1,097 x 18 m).

For the 12-month period ending June 3, 2021, the airport had 4,250 aircraft operations, an average of 81 per week: 92% general aviation, 7% air taxi, and 1% military. At that time there were 12 aircraft based at this airport: 11 single-engine, and 1 multi-engine.

== See also ==
- List of airports in North Dakota
