= Carrington Municipal Airport =

Airport in North Dakota, United States

- IATA: none; ICAO: none; FAA LID: 46D

Summary
- Airport type: Public
- Owner: Carrington Airport Authority
- Serves: Carrington, North Dakota
- Elevation AMSL: 1,607 ft (490 m)
- Coordinates: 47°27′04″N 99°09′04″W
- Interactive map of Carrington Municipal Airport

Runways
Direction	Length		Surface
Direction	ft	m	Surface
13/31	4,198	1,280	Asphalt

Statistics (2023)
- Aircraft operations (year ending 6/29/2023): 5,650
- Source: Federal Aviation Administration

Carrington Municipal Airport (FAA LID: 46D) is a public airport located one mile (1.6 km) west of the central business district of Carrington, in Foster County, North Dakota, United States. It is owned by the Carrington Airport Authority. Originally constructed in 1931, it was named Matheny Field in honor of retired Air Force Brig. Gen. William A. Matheny, a native of Carrington, until its expansion to two runways in 1969.

== Facilities and aircraft ==
Carrington Municipal Airport covers an area of 244 acres (99 ha) which contains one runway designated 13/31 with an asphalt surface measuring 4,198 by 75 feet (1,280 x 23 m).

For the 12-month period ending June 29, 2023, the airport had 5,650 aircraft operations: 98% general aviation, 2% air taxi, and less than 1% military.

== See also ==
- List of airports in North Dakota
