= McVille Municipal Airport =

Airport in Nelson County, North Dakota

- IATA: none; ICAO: none; FAA LID: 8M6

Summary
- Airport type: Public
- Owner: City of McVille
- Serves: McVille, North Dakota
- Elevation AMSL: 1,473 ft / 449 m
- Coordinates: 47°46′13″N 098°11′06″W

Map
- Location of airport in North Dakota 8M6 (the United States)

Runways
Direction	Length		Surface
Direction	ft	m	Surface
13/31	2,277	694	Turf
18/36	2,500	762	Turf

Statistics (2023)
- Aircraft operations (year ending 8/25/2023): 810
- Based aircraft: 3
- Source: Federal Aviation Administration

McVille Municipal Airport (FAA LID: 8M6) is a city-owned, public-use airport located one nautical mile (2 km) northwest of the central business district of McVille, a city in Nelson County, North Dakota, United States.

== Facilities and aircraft ==
McVille Municipal Airport covers an area of 90 acres (36 ha) at an elevation of 1,473 feet (449 m) above mean sea level. It has two runways with turf surfaces: 13/31 is 2,277 by 100 feet (694 x 30 m) and 18/36 is 2,500 by 90 feet (762 x 27 m).

For the 12-month period ending August 25, 2023, the airport had 810 aircraft operations, an average of 68 per month: 99% general aviation and 1% air taxi. At that time there were three single-engine aircraft based at this airport.

== See also ==
- List of airports in North Dakota
