= Grenora Centennial Airport =

Airport in North Dakota, United States

- IATA: none; ICAO: none; FAA LID: 7N6

Summary
- Airport type: Public
- Owner: City of Grenora
- Serves: Grenora, North Dakota
- Elevation AMSL: 2,145 ft (654 m)
- Coordinates: 48°37′23″N 103°55′32″W
- Interactive map of Grenora Centennial Airport

Runways
Direction	Length		Surface
Direction	ft	m	Surface
17/35	2,600	792	Turf
- Source: FAA, Aeronautics Commission

Grenora Centennial Airport (FAA LID: 7N6) is a city-owned, public-use airport located one nautical mile (1.85 km) northeast of the central business district of the City of Grenora, in Williams County, North Dakota, United States.

== Facilities and aircraft ==
Grenora Centennial Airport covers an area of 10 acres (4.0 ha) at an elevation of 2,145 feet (654 m) above mean sea level. It has one runway designated 17/35 with a turf surface measuring 2,600 by 100 feet (792 x 30 m).
