= Casselton Robert Miller Regional Airport =

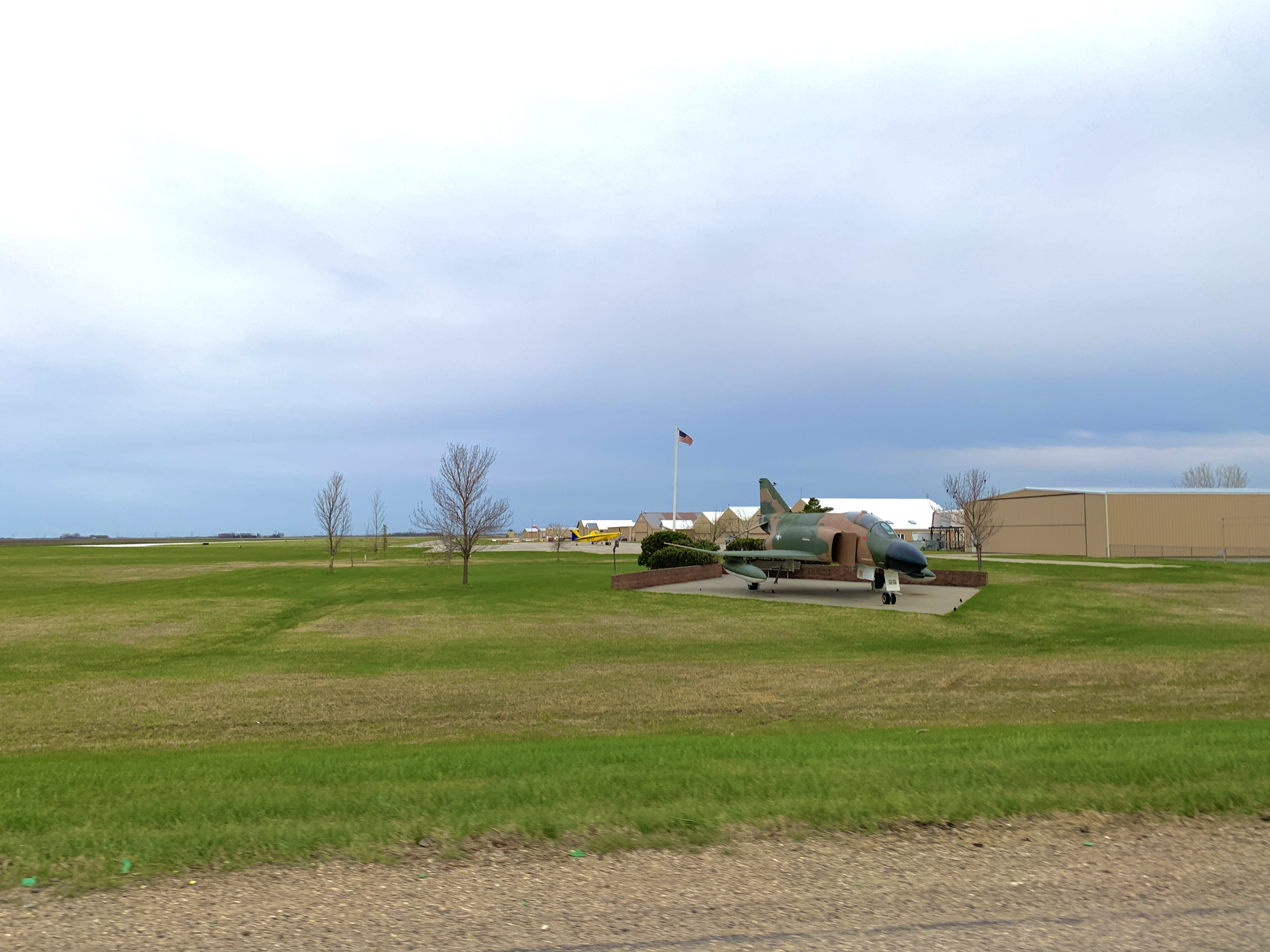
- IATA: none; ICAO: none; FAA LID: 5N8

Summary
- Airport type: Public
- Owner: Casselton Regional Airport Authority
- Location: Casselton, North Dakota
- Elevation AMSL: 933 ft (284 m)
- Coordinates: 46°51′15″N 97°12′31″W
- Interactive map of Casselton Robert Miller Regional Airport

Runways
Direction	Length		Surface
Direction	ft	m	Surface
13/31	3,901	1,189	Concrete

Statistics (2020)
- Aircraft operations (year ending 6/15/2020): 15,900
- Source: Federal Aviation Administration

Casselton Robert Miller Regional Airport (FAA LID: 5N8) is a public airport located 4 miles (6.4 km) south of the central business district of Casselton, in Cass County, North Dakota, United States. It is owned by the Casselton Regional Airport Authority.

== Facilities and aircraft ==
Casselton Robert Miller Regional Airport covers an area of 110 acres (45 ha) which contains one runway designated 13/31 with a concrete surface 3,901 by 75 feet (1,189 × 23 m).

For the 12-month period ending June 15, 2020, the airport had 15,900 aircraft operations: 94% general aviation, 1% air taxi, and 4% military.

== See also ==
- List of airports in North Dakota
