= Cando Municipal Airport =

Airport in North Dakota, United States

- IATA: none; ICAO: none; FAA LID: 9D7

Summary
- Airport type: Public
- Owner: Cando Airport Authority
- Serves: Cando, North Dakota
- Elevation AMSL: 1,481 ft (451 m)
- Coordinates: 48°21′48.1″N 99°14′11.0″W
- Interactive map of Cando Municipal Airport

Runways
Direction	Length		Surface
Direction	ft	m	Surface
16/34	3,500	1,067	Asphalt

Statistics (2023)
- Aircraft operations (year ending 6/29/2023): 5,210
- Source: Federal Aviation Administration

Cando Municipal Airport (FAA LID: 9D7) is a public airport located one mile (1.6 km) west of the central business district of Cando, North Dakota, in Towner County, North Dakota, United States. It is owned by the Cando Airport Authority.

== Facilities and aircraft ==
Cando Municipal Airport covers an area of 205 acres (83 ha) which contains one runway designated 16/34 with a 3,500 by 60 ft (1,067 x 18 m) asphalt surface.

For the 12-month period ending June 29, 2023, the airport had 5,210 aircraft operations: 97% general aviation, 2% military, and 1% air taxi.

== See also ==
- List of airports in North Dakota
