= Arthur Airport =

- IATA: none; ICAO: none; FAA LID: 1A2

Summary
- Airport type: Public
- Owner: Arthur Airport Authority
- Serves: Arthur, North Dakota
- Elevation AMSL: 973 ft (297 m)
- Coordinates: 47°06′40″N 097°12′26″W
- Interactive map of Arthur Airport

Runways
Direction	Length		Surface
Direction	ft	m	Surface
17/35	3,100	945	Turf

Statistics (2007)
- Aircraft operations: 510
- Based aircraft: 3
- Source: Federal Aviation Administration

Arthur Airport (FAA LID: 1A2) is a public airport located one mile (2 km) northeast of the central business district of Arthur, a city in Cass County, North Dakota, United States. It is owned by the Arthur Airport Authority.

== Facilities and aircraft ==
Arthur Airport covers an area of 10 acres (4.0 ha) and has one runway designated 17/35 with a 3,100 by 85 ft (945 by 26 m) turf surface. For the 12-month period ending July 31, 2007, the airport had 510 aircraft operations, an average of 43 per month: 98% general aviation and 2% air taxi.

== See also ==
- List of airports in North Dakota
