= Bottineau Municipal Airport =

- IATA: none; ICAO: none; FAA LID: D09

Summary
- Airport type: Public
- Owner: Bottineau Airport Authority
- Location: Bottineau, North Dakota
- Elevation AMSL: 1,679 ft (512 m)
- Coordinates: 48°49′49″N 100°25′02″W
- Interactive map of Bottineau Municipal Airport

Runways
| Direction | Length | | Surface |
| Direction | ft | m | Surface |
|---|---|---|---|
| 13/31 | 3,700 | 1,128 | Asphalt |
| 3/21 | 2,115 | 645 | Turf |

Statistics (2018)
- Aircraft operations (year ending 7/16/2018): 5,360
- Source: Federal Aviation Administration

Bottineau Municipal Airport (FAA LID: D09) is a public airport located one mile (1.6 km) east of the central business district of Bottineau, in Bottineau County, North Dakota, United States. It is owned by the Bottineau Airport Authority.

== Facilities and aircraft ==
Bottineau Municipal Airport covers an area of 188 acres (76 ha), which contains two runways:

- Runway 13/31: 3,700 x 60 ft (1,128 x 18 m), surface: asphalt
- Runway 3/21: 2,115 x 170 ft (610 x 46 m), surface: turf

For the 12-month period ending July 16, 2018, the airport had 5,360 aircraft operations: 93% general aviation, 5% air taxi, and 2% military.

== See also ==
- List of airports in North Dakota
