= Cooperstown Municipal Airport =

Airport in Griggs County, North Dakota, US

- IATA: none; ICAO: none; FAA LID: S32

Summary
- Airport type: Public
- Owner: Cooperstown Airport Authority
- Serves: Cooperstown, North Dakota
- Elevation AMSL: 1,424 ft (434 m)
- Coordinates: 47°25′22″N 98°06′21″W
- Interactive map of Cooperstown Municipal Airport

Runways
Direction	Length		Surface
Direction	ft	m	Surface
13/31	3,500	1,067	Asphalt

Statistics (2021)
- Aircraft operations (year ending 10/20/2021): 3,340
- Source: Federal Aviation Administration

Cooperstown Municipal Airport (FAA LID: S32) is a public airport located two miles (3.2 km) southeast of the central business district of Cooperstown, in Griggs County, North Dakota, United States. It is owned by the Cooperstown Airport Authority.

== Facilities and aircraft ==
Cooperstown Municipal Airport covers an area of 150 acres (61 ha) which contains one runway designated 13/31 with a 3,500 by 60 ft (1,067 x 18 m) asphalt surface.

For the 12-month period ending October 20, 2021, the airport had 3,340 aircraft operations: 84% general aviation, 15% air taxi, and 1% military

== See also ==
- List of airports in North Dakota
