= Kulm, North Dakota =

- City
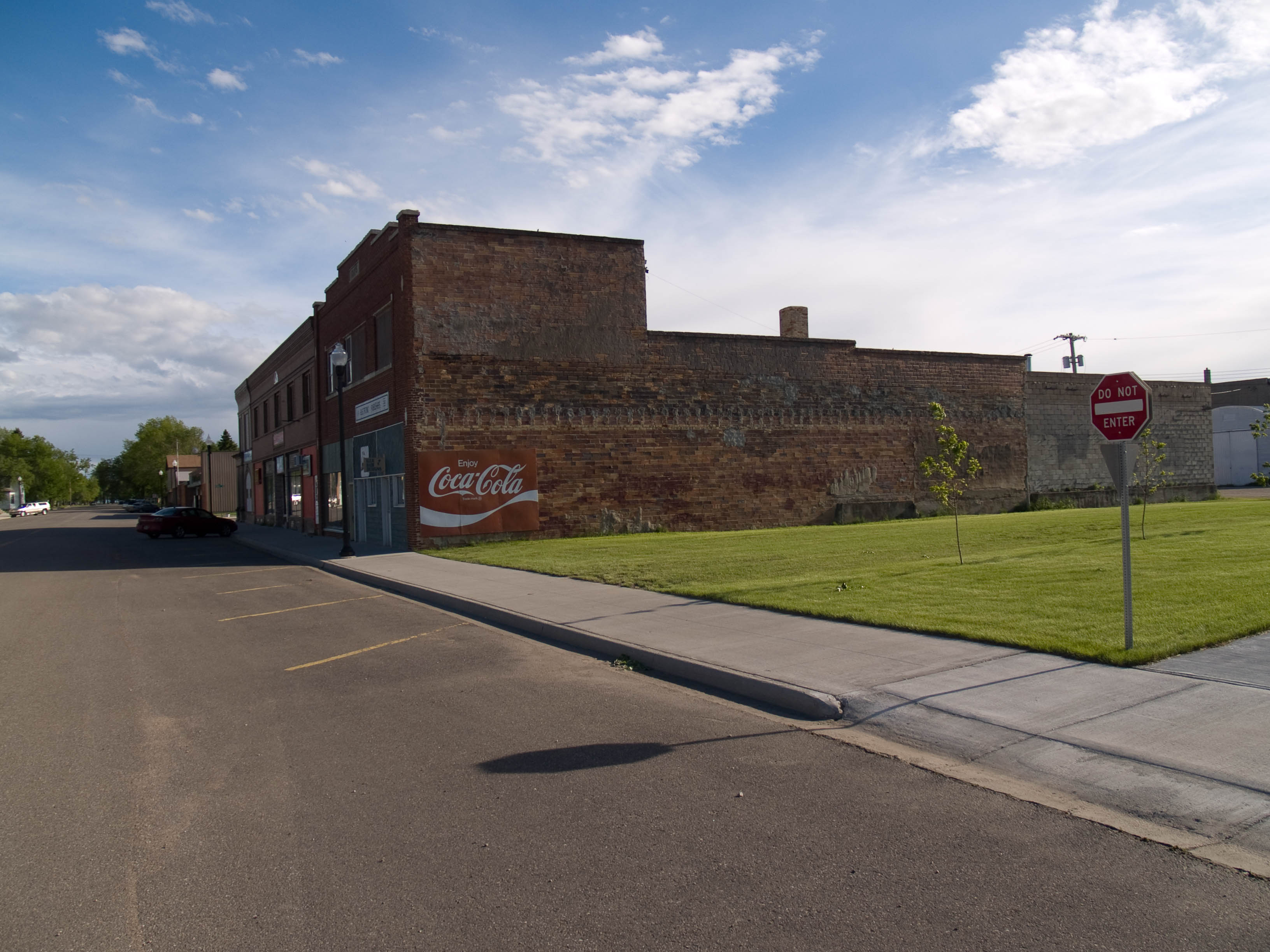
- Business district in Kulm
- Motto: "Small Town With A Big Heart"
- Location of Kulm, North Dakota
- Coordinates: 46°18′7″N 98°56′53″W
- Country: United States
- State: North Dakota
- County: LaMoure
- Founded: 1892

Government
  - Mayor: Phillip N. Hagen

Area
  - Total: 0.38 sq mi (0.99 km^{2})
  - Land: 0.38 sq mi (0.99 km^{2})
  - Water: 0 sq mi (0.00 km^{2})
- Elevation: 1,972 ft (601 m)

Population (2020)
  - Total: 368
  - Estimate (2022): 368
  - Density: 962.7/sq mi (371.69/km^{2})
- Time zone: UTC-6 (Central (CST))
  - Summer (DST): UTC-5 (CDT)
- ZIP code: 58456
- Area code: 701
- FIPS code: 38-43580
- GNIS feature ID: 1033648
- Website: www.kulmnd.com

Kulm is a city in LaMoure County, North Dakota, United States. The population was 368 at the 2020 census. Kulm was founded in 1892.

== Geography ==
Kulm is located at 46°18′7″N 98°56′53″W (46.301844, -98.948135).

According to the United States Census Bureau, the city has a total area of 0.38 square miles (0.98 km^{2}), all land.

== Transportation ==
Kulm Municipal Airport (FAA LID: D03) is a public use airport located one nautical mile (1.85 km) northeast of the central business district of Kulm.

== Demographics ==
Historical population
Census	Pop.	Note	%±
1900	463		—
1910	645		39.3%
1920	725		12.4%
1930	742		2.3%
1940	734		−1.1%
1950	707		−3.7%
1960	664		−6.1%
1970	625		−5.9%
1980	570		−8.8%
1990	514		−9.8%
2000	422		−17.9%
2010	354		−16.1%
2020	368		4.0%
2022 (est.)	368		0.0%
U.S. Decennial Census; 2020 Census

=== 2010 census ===
As of the census of 2010, there were 354 people, 179 households, and 91 families residing in the city. The population density was 931.6 inhabitants per square mile (359.7/km^{2}). There were 248 housing units at an average density of 652.6 per square mile (252.0/km^{2}). The racial makeup of the city was 97.7% White, 0.3% Native American, 1.4% from other races, and 0.6% from two or more races. Hispanic or Latino of any race were 4.5% of the population.

There were 179 households, of which 19.6% had children under the age of 18 living with them, 44.7% were married couples living together, 3.4% had a female householder with no husband present, 2.8% had a male householder with no wife present, and 49.2% were non-families. 45.3% of all households were made up of individuals, and 30.7% had someone living alone who was 65 years of age or older. The average household size was 1.98 and the average family size was 2.77.

The median age in the city was 51.3 years. 21.5% of residents were under the age of 18; 5% were between the ages of 18 and 24; 16.1% were from 25 to 44; 25.1% were from 45 to 64; and 32.2% were 65 years of age or older. The gender makeup of the city was 45.8% male and 54.2% female.

=== 2000 census ===
As of the census of 2000, there were 422 people, 214 households, and 123 families residing in the city. The population density was 1,335.7 inhabitants per square mile (515.7/km^{2}). There were 251 housing units at an average density of 794.5 per square mile (306.8/km^{2}). The racial makeup of the city was 99.05% White, 0.24% Native American, 0.24% from other races, and 0.47% from two or more races. Hispanic or Latino of any race were 1.90% of the population.

There were 214 households, out of which 17.3% had children under the age of 18 living with them, 53.3% were married couples living together, 2.8% had a female householder with no husband present, and 42.1% were non-families. 40.7% of all households were made up of individuals, and 29.4% had someone living alone who was 65 years of age or older. The average household size was 1.97 and the average family size was 2.63.

In the city, the population was spread out, with 16.4% under the age of 18, 4.7% from 18 to 24, 16.6% from 25 to 44, 22.7% from 45 to 64, and 39.6% who were 65 years of age or older. The median age was 56 years. For every 100 females, there were 89.2 males. For every 100 females age 18 and over, there were 88.8 males.

The median income for a household in the city was $25,125, and the median income for a family was $29,643. Males had a median income of $29,583 versus $16,607 for females. The per capita income for the city was $19,904. About 7.7% of families and 10.4% of the population were below the poverty line, including 7.9% of those under age 18 and 14.6% of those age 65 or over.

== Climate ==
This climatic region is typified by large seasonal temperature differences, with warm to hot (and often humid) summers and cold (sometimes severely cold) winters. According to the Köppen Climate Classification system, Kulm has a humid continental climate, abbreviated "Dfb" on climate maps.

== Notable people ==
- Angie Dickinson, actress, left when she was 11
- Dr. Jacob Frederick Brenckle, mycologist.
