= Columbus Municipal Airport (North Dakota) =

Airport in North Dakota, United States

- IATA: none; ICAO: none; FAA LID: D49

Summary
- Airport type: Public
- Owner: Columbus Airport Authority
- Serves: Columbus, North Dakota
- Elevation AMSL: 1,930 ft (590 m)
- Coordinates: 48°53′58″N 102°47′32″W

Map
- Location of airport in North Dakota D49 (the United States)

Runways
Direction	Length		Surface
Direction	ft	m	Surface
7/25	2,560	780	Turf

Statistics (2012)
- Aircraft operations: 120
- Source: Federal Aviation Administration

Columbus Municipal Airport (FAA LID: D49) is a public use airport located one nautical mile (2 km) southwest of the central business district of Columbus, a city in Burke County, North Dakota, United States. It is owned by the Columbus Airport Authority.

== Facilities and aircraft ==
Columbus Municipal Airport covers an area of 97 acres (39 ha) at an elevation of 1,930 feet (588 m) above mean sea level. It has one runway designated 7/25 with a turf surface measuring 2,560 by 100 feet (780 x 30 m).

For the 12-month period ending September 21, 2012, the airport had 120 aircraft operations, an average of 10 per month: 83% general aviation and 17% air taxi.

== See also ==
- List of airports in North Dakota
