= USS Bottineau =

1944 US Navy attack transport

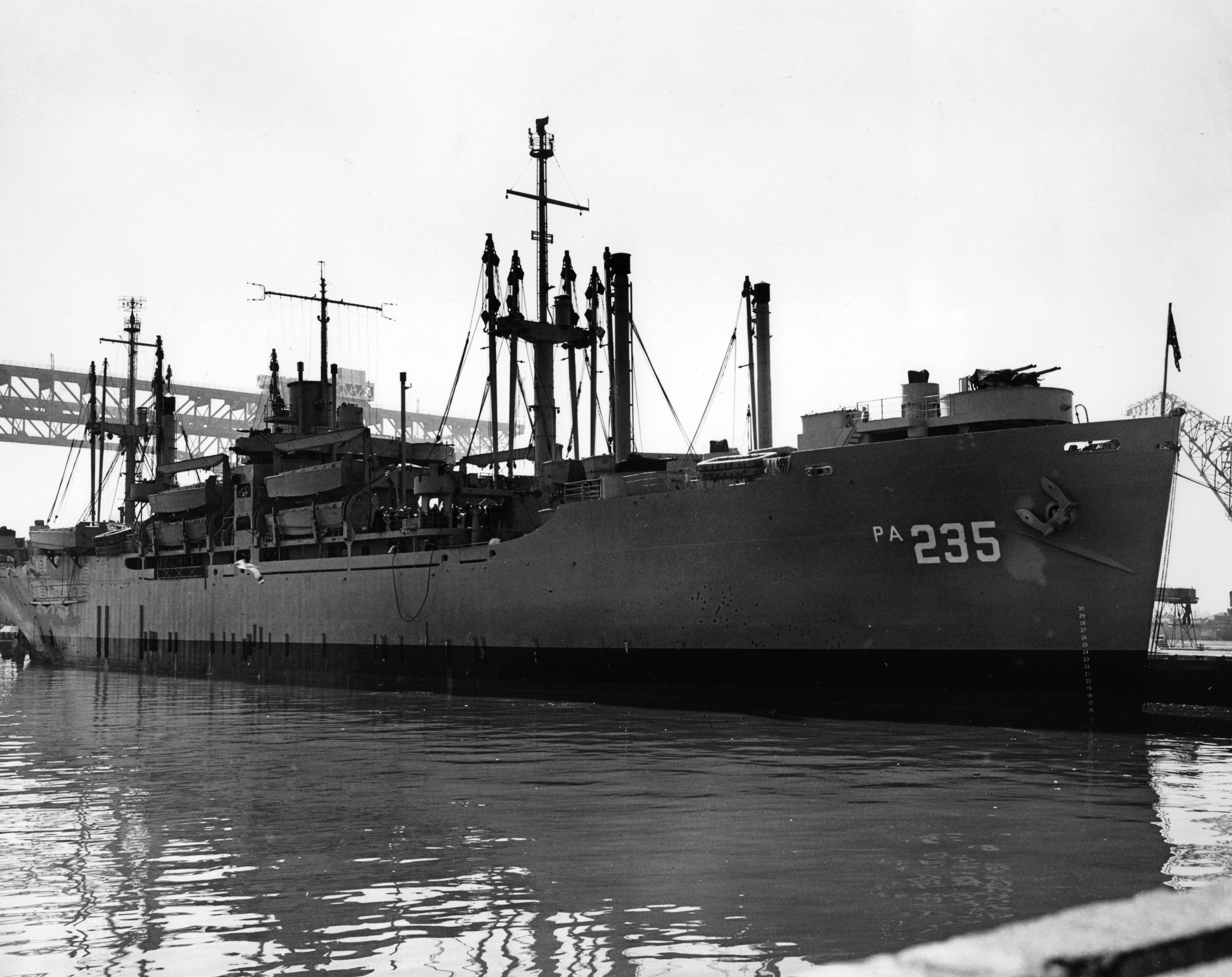

History

United States
- Name: USS Bottineau (APA-235)
- Namesake: Bottineau County, North Dakota
- Builder: Kaiser Shipbuilding
- Laid down: 11 October 1944
- Launched: 22 November 1944
- Sponsored by: Mrs Paul Durand
- Acquired: 30 December 1944
- Commissioned: 30 December 1944
- Decommissioned: 31 August 1955
- Reclassified: LPA-235, 1 January 1969 (while in Reserve Fleet)
- Stricken: 1 July 1961
- Honours and awards: One battle star for World War II
- Fate: Scrapped 1983

General characteristics
- Class & type: Haskell-class attack transport
- Displacement: 6,720 tons (lt), 14,837 t. (fl)
- Length: 455 ft
- Beam: 62 ft
- Draft: 24 ft
- Propulsion: 1 × Joshua Hendy geared turbine, 2 × Babcock & Wilcox header-type boilers, 1 × propeller, designed shaft horsepower 8,500
- Speed: 17.5 knots
- Boats & landing craft carried: 2 × LCM, 12 × LCVP, 3 × LCPU
- Capacity: 86 Officers 1,475 Enlisted
- Crew: 56 Officers, 480 enlisted
- Armament: 1 × 5"/38-caliber dual-purpose gun mount, 1 × quad 40 mm gun mount, 4 × twin 40 mm gun mounts, 10 × single 20 mm gun mounts
- Notes: MCV Hull No. 681, hull type VC2-S-AP5

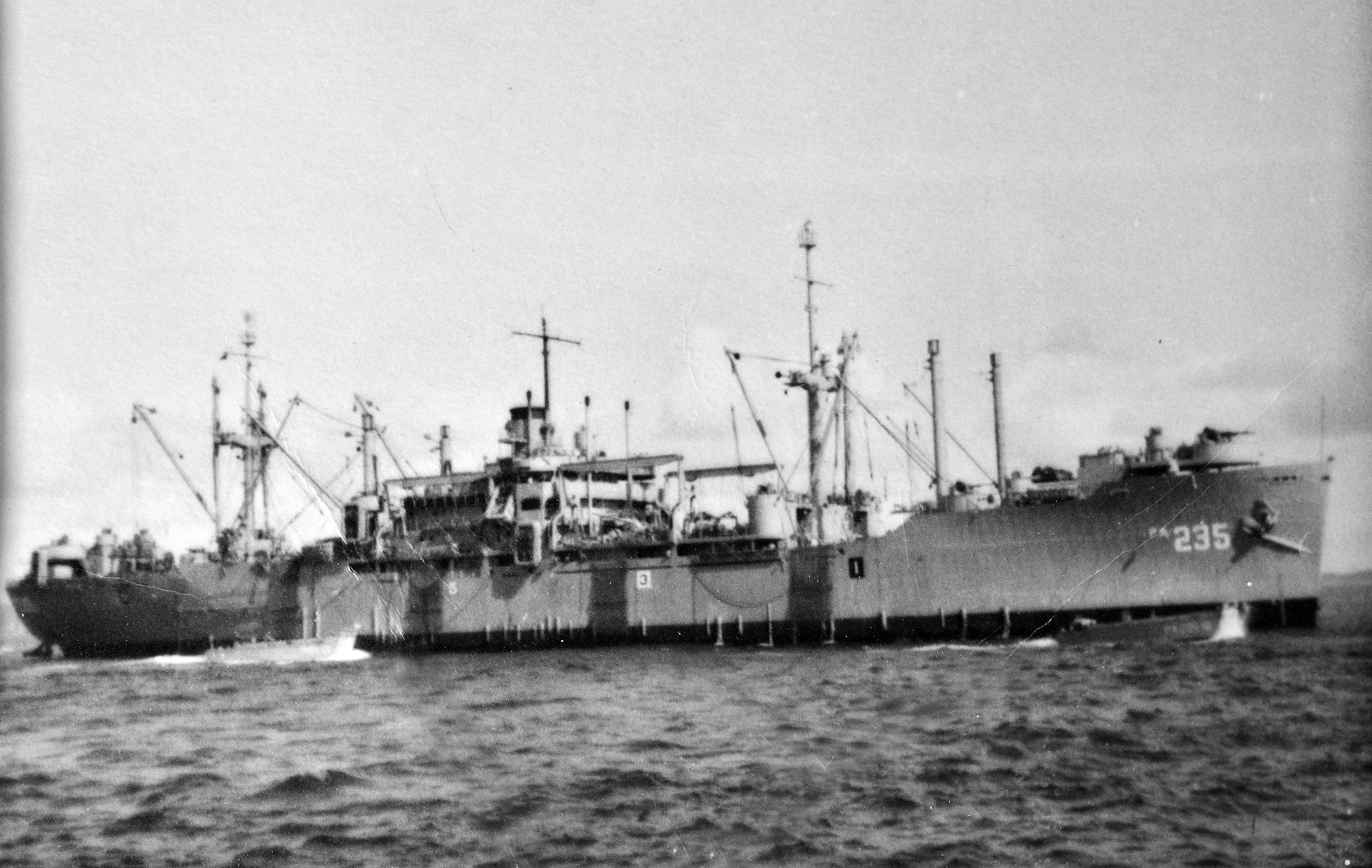
USS Bottineau (APA-235) during an amphibious landing exercise in the Caribbean in 1954. The ship's landing craft have been launched (some are visible next to the ship,) and the davits and cranes are deployed. Note the numbers on the side of the ship (odd numbers 1, 3, 5 and 7 on the starboard side,) to guide the landing craft coxswain and the nets used by the Marines to board the landing craft.

USS Bottineau (APA-235) was a Haskell-class attack transport in service with the United States Navy from 1944 to 1947 and from 1951 to 1955. She was scrapped in 1983.

== History ==
Bottineau was named after Bottineau County, North Dakota. She was launched on 22 November 1944 by Kaiser Shipbuilding of Vancouver, Washington, under a United States Maritime Commission contract; transferred to the Navy 30 December, and commissioned the same day.

=== World War II ===
Reporting to the Pacific Fleet, Bottineau carried a cargo of ammunition to Pearl Harbor during March 1945. Departing Pearl Harbor 9 April she carried replacement troops to Saipan, Marianas Islands, and evacuated casualties from Okinawa before returning to the United States on 10 June 1945. She then carried replacement troops to the Philippines and returned to Pearl Harbor to prepare for the invasion of Japan.

Following the Japanese surrender she landed elements of the 98th Division at Wakayama, Honshu, Japan, 1 October 1945. Bottineau departed 6 October for Guam and returned to the United States with Pacific veterans, arriving at Seattle, Washington, 26 January 1946.

=== Operation Crossroads ===
Between February and May 1946 Bottineau operated between San Francisco and San Diego. Departing San Pedro, California, 25 May 1946, she arrived at Bikini Atoll 6 June for Operation Crossroads, designed to test the effectiveness of atomic bombs on warships. Over 200 warships participated in the operation, 75 of them as targets.

Bottineau's role in the tests was to act as a transport for the target vessel boarding teams. Following the tests she returned to San Francisco, arriving 21 August. She was placed out of commission in reserve there 8 March 1947.

=== Cold War ===
Recommissioned 24 March 1951, Bottineau served with Amphibious Forces, Pacific Fleet, until August when she steamed to Norfolk, Virginia, arriving 4 September. Bottineau served with the Atlantic Fleet, taking part in amphibious training exercises and other routine peacetime duties, until going out of commission at Philadelphia 31 August 1955.

=== Fate ===
She was struck from the Naval Vessel Register on 1 July 1961 and returned to the Maritime Administration, who transferred her to the National Defense Reserve Fleet, James River, Fort Eustis, Virginia. On 1 January 1969, while still in the Reserve Fleet, she was redesignated an amphibious transport, LPA-235. She was sold for scrapping to Sociedad Anonima Desbar S.A. Spain on 1 August 1983.

== Awards ==
For her World War II service Bottineau received one battle star.
