= McClusky, North Dakota =

- City
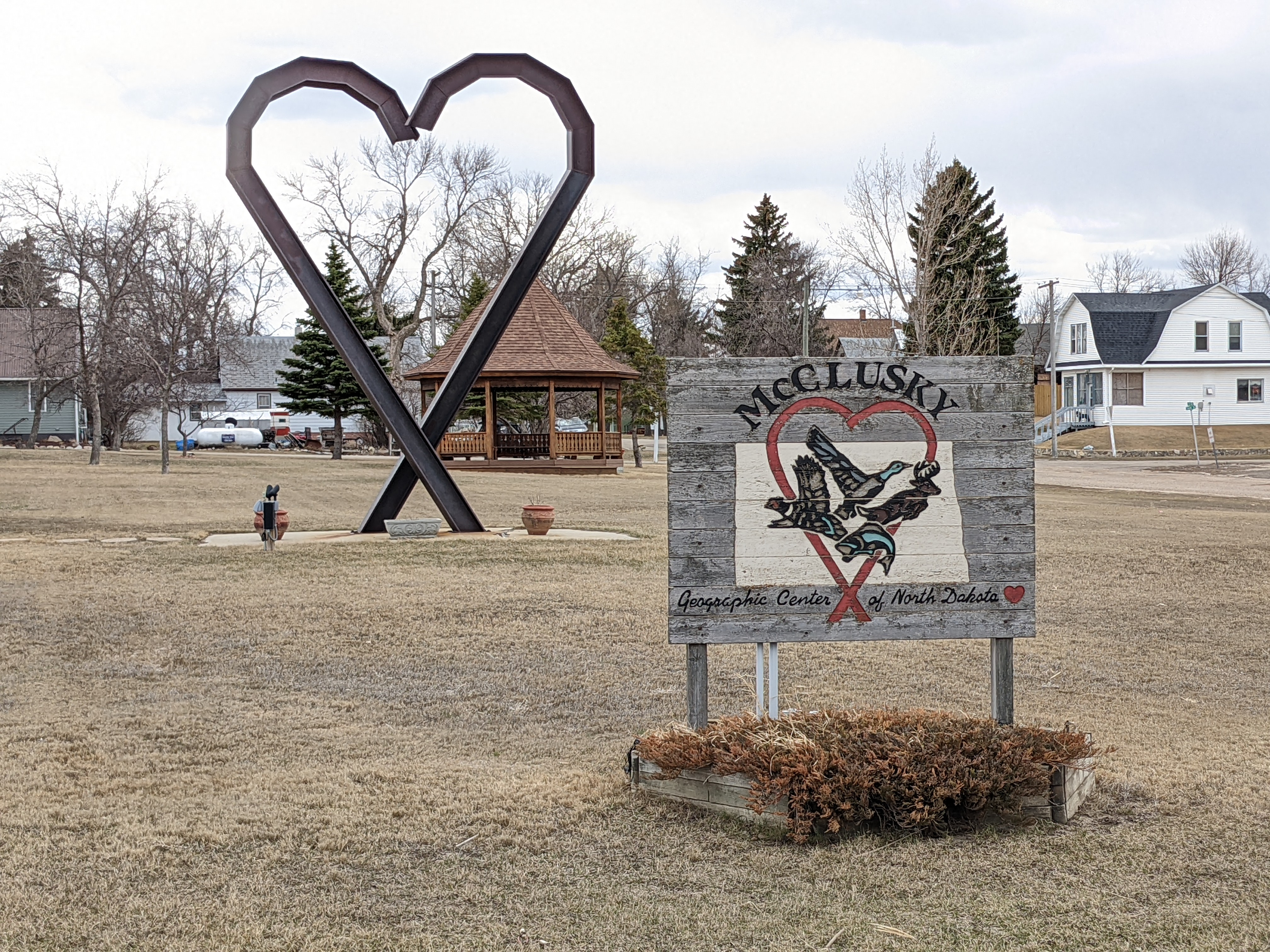
- Sign and sculpture entering McClusky on Highway 200
- Motto: "Heart of North Dakota"
- Location of McClusky, North Dakota
- Coordinates: 47°29′02″N 100°26′33″W
- Country: United States
- State: North Dakota
- County: Sheridan
- Founded: 1905

Area
  - Total: 0.37 sq mi (0.96 km^{2})
  - Land: 0.37 sq mi (0.96 km^{2})
  - Water: 0 sq mi (0.00 km^{2})
- Elevation: 1,940 ft (590 m)

Population (2020)
  - Total: 322
  - Estimate (2024): 315
  - Density: 867/sq mi (334.8/km^{2})
- Time zone: UTC–6 (Central (CST))
  - Summer (DST): UTC–5 (CDT)
- ZIP Code: 58463
- Area code: 701
- FIPS code: 38-49020
- GNIS feature ID: 1036141
- Website: mccluskynd.com

McClusky is a city in Sheridan County, North Dakota, United States. It is the county seat of Sheridan County. The population was 322 at the 2020 census. McClusky was founded in 1905. It is the closest town to the geographical center of North Dakota, which lies approximately five miles to the southwest.

== History ==
McClusky was laid out in 1905 when the railroad was extended to that point. The city was named for William Henderson McClusky, an early settler. A post office called McClusky has been in operation since 1903. The Sheridan County Courthouse was built in 1938.

== Transportation ==
The Red River Valley and Western Railroad ran to McClusky and further west until the early 1990s, with formal abandonment of the rail line occurring in 2000. North Dakota Highway 200 which runs through downtown is popular with cross-country cyclists. There is also an airport for small planes, the McClusky Municipal Airport.

== Geography ==
According to the United States Census Bureau, the city has a total area of 0.39 square miles (1.01 km^{2}), all land.

McClusky is considered the "heart" of North Dakota as it is the geographical center of North Dakota.

== Demographics ==
Historical population
Census	Pop.	Note	%±
1910	517		—
1920	646		25.0%
1930	719		11.3%
1940	924		28.5%
1950	850		−8.0%
1960	751		−11.6%
1970	664		−11.6%
1980	658		−0.9%
1990	492		−25.2%
2000	415		−15.7%
2010	380		−8.4%
2020	322		−15.3%
2024 (est.)	315		−2.2%
U.S. Decennial Census; 2020 Census

=== 2010 census ===
As of the 2010 census, there were 380 people, 206 households, and 103 families residing in the city. The population density was 974.4 inhabitants per square mile (376.2/km^{2}). There were 278 housing units at an average density of 712.8 per square mile (275.2/km^{2}). The racial makeup of the city was 91.8% White, 0.5% African American, 2.9% Native American, 0.5% Pacific Islander, 1.3% from other races, and 2.9% from two or more races. Hispanic or Latino of any race were 2.1% of the population.

There were 206 households, of which 13.6% had children under the age of 18 living with them, 39.8% were married couples living together, 7.8% had a female householder with no husband present, 2.4% had a male householder with no wife present, and 50.0% were non-families. 47.6% of all households were made up of individuals, and 27.7% had someone living alone who was 65 years of age or older. The average household size was 1.84 and the average family size was 2.58.

The median age in the city was 54 years. 17.1% of residents were under the age of 18; 6% were between the ages of 18 and 24; 16.8% were from 25 to 44; 23% were from 45 to 64; and 37.1% were 65 years of age or older. The gender makeup of the city was 44.5% male and 55.5% female.

=== 2000 census ===
As of the 2000 census, there were 500 people, 205 households, and 110 families residing in the city. The population density was 1,072.9 inhabitants per square mile (414.2/km^{2}). There were 247 housing units at an average density of 638.6 per square mile (246.6/km^{2}). The racial makeup of the city was 99.28% White and 0.72% Native American. Hispanic or Latino of any race were 0.48% of the population.

There were 205 households, out of which 18.0% had children under the age of 18 living with them, 47.8% were married couples living together, 5.4% had a female householder with no husband present, and 45.9% were non-families. 43.4% of all households were made up of individuals, and 27.3% had someone living alone who was 65 years of age or older. The average household size was 1.93 and the average family size was 2.64.

In the city, the population was spread out, with 16.9% under the age of 18, 4.1% from 18 to 24, 17.8% from 25 to 44, 24.6% from 45 to 64, and 36.6% who were 65 years of age or older. The median age was 56 years. For every 100 females, there were 82.8 males. For every 100 females age 18 and over, there were 82.5 males.

The median income for a household in the city was $21,731, and the median income for a family was $32,344. Males had a median income of $26,094 versus $15,625 for females. The per capita income for the city was $14,874. About 12.4% of families and 21.5% of the population were below the poverty line, including 33.3% of those under age 18 and 22.9% of those age 65 or over.

== Education ==
McClusky School District is the local school district.

== Notable person ==
- John E. Davis, mayor of McClusky, 25th governor of North Dakota

== Climate ==
This climatic region is typified by large seasonal temperature differences, with warm to hot (and often humid) summers and cold (sometimes severely cold) winters. According to the Köppen Climate Classification system, McClusky has a humid continental climate, abbreviated "Dfb" on climate maps.

Climate data for McClusky, North Dakota (1991–2020 normals, extremes 1922–present)
Month	Jan	Feb	Mar	Apr	May	Jun	Jul	Aug	Sep	Oct	Nov	Dec	Year
Record high °F (°C)	59 (15)	65 (18)	81 (27)	95 (35)	105 (41)	105 (41)	115 (46)	105 (41)	106 (41)	93 (34)	76 (24)	62 (17)	115 (46)
Mean daily maximum °F (°C)	23.0 (−5.0)	27.3 (−2.6)	40.4 (4.7)	57.0 (13.9)	70.6 (21.4)	79.4 (26.3)	85.3 (29.6)	85.2 (29.6)	75.3 (24.1)	58.3 (14.6)	40.4 (4.7)	27.2 (−2.7)	55.8 (13.2)
Daily mean °F (°C)	13.0 (−10.6)	16.8 (−8.4)	29.2 (−1.6)	44.3 (6.8)	57.3 (14.1)	66.9 (19.4)	72.3 (22.4)	71.2 (21.8)	61.6 (16.4)	46.3 (7.9)	30.4 (−0.9)	17.8 (−7.9)	43.9 (6.6)
Mean daily minimum °F (°C)	3.0 (−16.1)	6.3 (−14.3)	18.0 (−7.8)	31.7 (−0.2)	44.0 (6.7)	54.4 (12.4)	59.4 (15.2)	57.1 (13.9)	47.8 (8.8)	34.4 (1.3)	20.4 (−6.4)	8.5 (−13.1)	32.1 (0.1)
Record low °F (°C)	−38 (−39)	−53 (−47)	−33 (−36)	−10 (−23)	9 (−13)	26 (−3)	30 (−1)	26 (−3)	7 (−14)	−6 (−21)	−23 (−31)	−36 (−38)	−53 (−47)
Average precipitation inches (mm)	0.49 (12)	0.45 (11)	0.67 (17)	1.23 (31)	2.48 (63)	3.36 (85)	2.53 (64)	2.30 (58)	1.91 (49)	1.39 (35)	0.69 (18)	0.67 (17)	18.17 (462)
Average snowfall inches (cm)	7.8 (20)	5.6 (14)	5.9 (15)	4.4 (11)	0.4 (1.0)	0.0 (0.0)	0.0 (0.0)	0.0 (0.0)	0.0 (0.0)	2.8 (7.1)	8.8 (22)	9.3 (24)	45.0 (114)
Average precipitation days (≥ 0.01 in)	5.2	4.7	4.9	5.5	9.2	10.3	8.6	6.8	6.6	6.5	5.5	5.6	79.4
Average snowy days (≥ 0.1 in)	4.8	3.7	2.5	1.1	0.2	0.0	0.0	0.0	0.0	1.1	3.7	4.7	21.8
Source: NOAA
