= Devils Lake Regional Airport =

Airport in North Dakota, United States

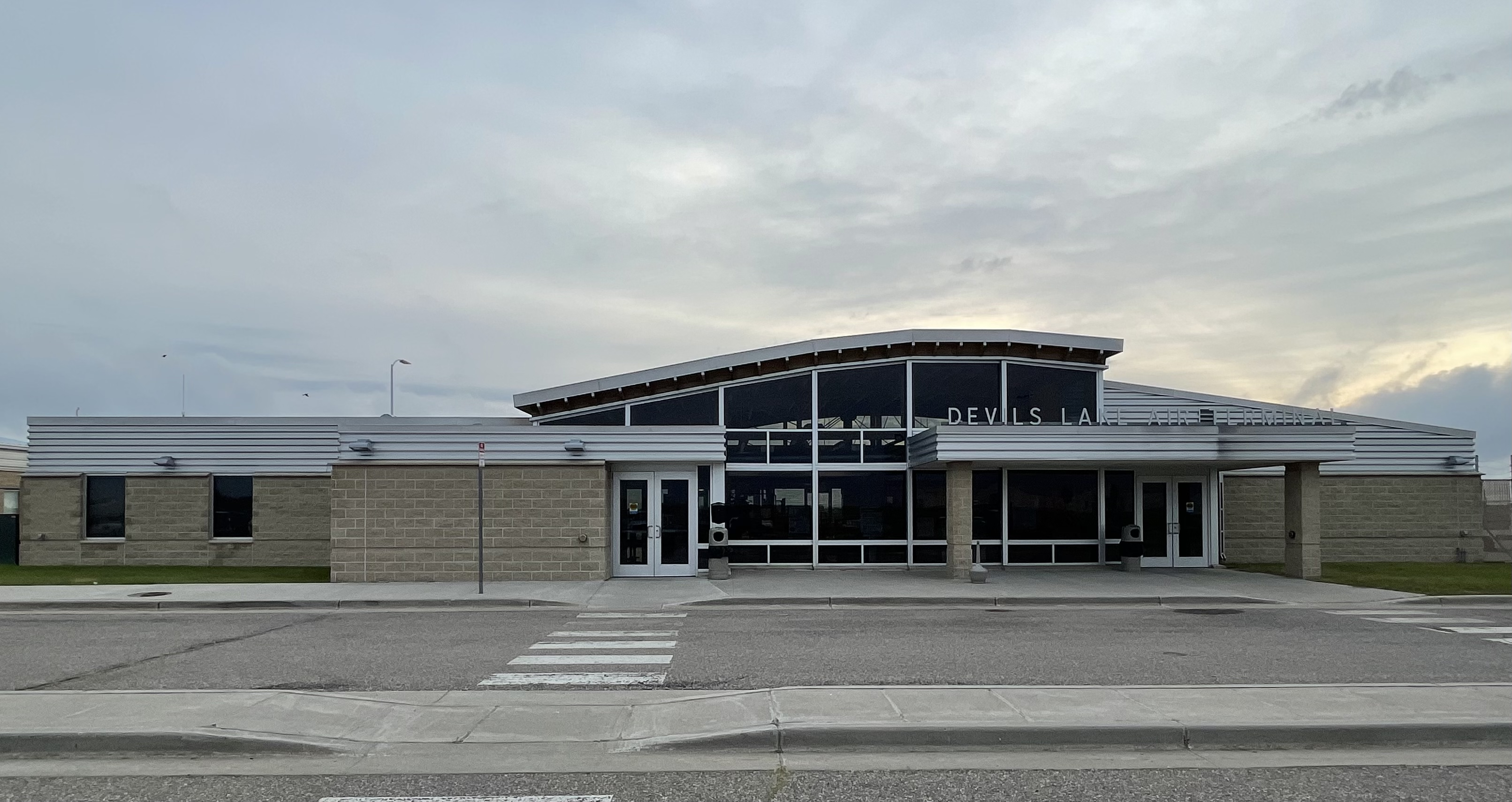
- IATA: DVL; ICAO: KDVL; FAA LID: DVL

Summary
- Airport type: Public
- Owner: Devils Lake Airport Authority
- Serves: Devils Lake, North Dakota
- Elevation AMSL: 1,456 ft (444 m)
- Coordinates: 48°06′52″N 098°54′30″W
- Website: DevilsLakeAirport.com

Map
- Location of airport in North Dakota DVL (the United States)

Runways
Direction	Length		Surface
Direction	ft	m	Surface
13/31	6,400	1,951	Asphalt
3/21	4,314	1,315	Asphalt

Statistics (2021)
- Aircraft operations: 23,780
- Based aircraft: 28
- Sources: FAA Airport website

Devils Lake Regional Airport (IATA: DVL, ICAO: KDVL, FAA LID: DVL) is a public use airport located two nautical miles (4 km) west of the central business district of Devils Lake, a city in Ramsey County, North Dakota, United States. It is owned by the Devils Lake Airport Authority and was formerly known as Devils Lake Municipal Airport. A new terminal recently opened for business at the airport. DVL is mostly used for general aviation but is also served by one commercial airline, with flights two times daily. Scheduled passenger service is subsidized by the Essential Air Service program.

As per Federal Aviation Administration records, the airport had 3,216 passenger boardings (enplanements) in calendar year 2008, 3,984 enplanements in 2009, and 5,242 in 2010. It is included in the National Plan of Integrated Airport Systems for 2011–2015, which categorized it as a non-primary commercial service airport (between 2,500 and 10,000 enplanements per year).

== Facilities and aircraft ==
Devils Lake Regional Airport covers an area of 730 acres (295 ha) at an elevation of 1,456 feet (444 m) above mean sea level. It has two runways with asphalt surfaces: 13/31 is 6,400 by 100 feet (1,951 x 30 m) and 3/21 is 4,314 by 75 feet (1,315 x 23 m).

For the 12-month period ending December 31, 2021, the airport had 23,780 aircraft operations, an average of 65 per day: 83% general aviation, 10% air taxi, 5% airline, and 2% military. At that time there were 28 aircraft based at this airport: 24 single-engine 3 multi-engine, and 1 jet.

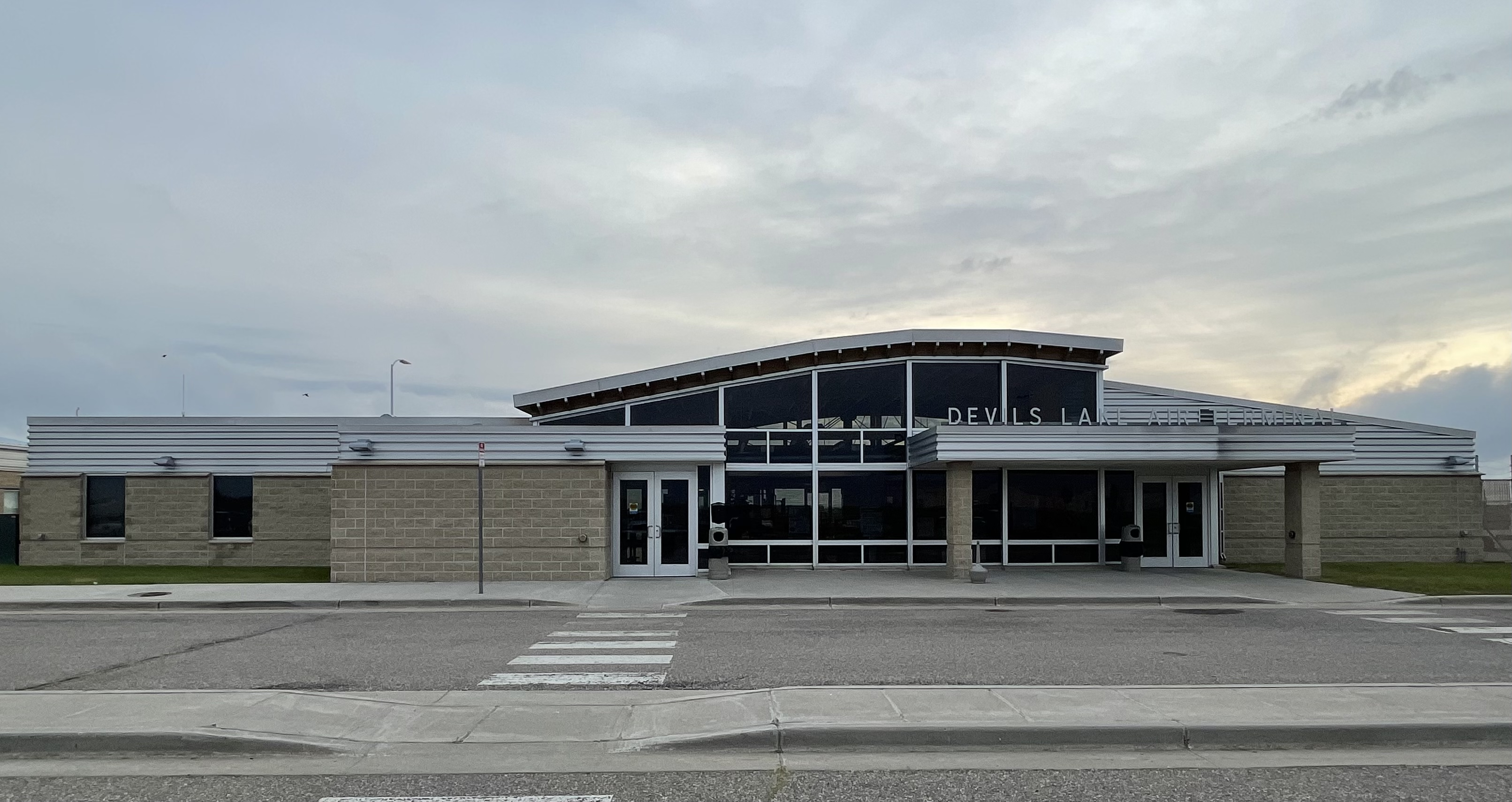
Devils Lake Regional Airport, Devils Lake, North Dakota

== Airlines and destinations ==
The following airline offers scheduled passenger service:

Airlines	Destinations
United Express	Denver

== Statistics ==
Top domestic destinations: (December 2023 - November 2024)
Rank	Airport	Passengers	Airline
1	Denver, Colorado	8,900	United
2	Jamestown, North Dakota	500	United

== See also ==
- List of airports in North Dakota

== Other sources ==
- Essential Air Service documents (Docket DOT-OST-1997-2785) from the U.S. Department of Transportation:
  - Order 2005-11-17 (November 22, 2005): selecting Mesaba Aviation, Inc., d/b/a Mesaba Airlines, to provide essential air service with Saab 340 aircraft at Devils Lake and Jamestown, North Dakota, for two years for annual subsidy rates of $1,329,858 at Devils Lake and $1,351,677 at Jamestown ($2,681,535 annually for both points combined).
  - Order 2007-8-16 (August 17, 2007): re-selects Mesaba Aviation, Inc., d/b/a Mesaba Airlines, operating as Northwest AirLink, to provide essential air service with Saab 340 aircraft at Devils Lake and Jamestown, North Dakota, for the two-year period of October 1, 2007, through September 30, 2008, for annual subsidy rates of $1,331,664 at Devils Lake and $1,355,011 at Jamestown ($2,685,675 annually for both points combined).
  - Order 2009-8-6 (August 11, 2009): re-selecting Mesaba Aviation, Inc., d/b/a Delta Connection, to provide Essential Air Service (EAS) with Saab 340 aircraft at Devils Lake and Jamestown, North Dakota, for the two-year period of October 1, 2009, through September 30, 2011, for annual subsidy rates of $1,459,493 at Devils Lake and $1,963,220 at Jamestown ($3,422,713 annually for both points combined).
  - Ninety Day Notice (July 15, 2011): of Mesaba Aviation, Inc. and Pinnacle Airlines, Inc. of termination of service at Devils Lake, ND and Jamestown, ND.
  - Order 2011-12-6 (December 14, 2011): selecting Great Lakes Aviation, Ltd. to provide Essential Air Service (EAS) at Devils Lake, North Dakota, for an annual subsidy of $2,797,467, effective with the start of service by Great Lakes. We anticipate that Great Lakes will start service on or about December 17, 2011.
  - Order 2014-1-19 (January 30, 2014): selecting SkyWest Airlines (SkyWest) to provide Essential Air Service (EAS) at Devils Lake, North Dakota, for $3,224,917 annually, and Jamestown, North Dakota, for $3,126,564 annually, with service set at eleven (11) nonstop or one-stop round trips per week at each community to Denver International Airport (DEN).
