= St. Thomas Municipal Airport (North Dakota) =

- IATA: none; ICAO: none; FAA LID: 4S5

Summary
- Airport type: Public
- Owner: St. Thomas Airport Authority
- Serves: St. Thomas, North Dakota
- Elevation AMSL: 839 ft / 256 m
- Coordinates: 48°37′35″N 097°26′21″W

Map
- Location of airport in North Dakota 4S5 (the United States)

Runways
Direction	Length		Surface
Direction	ft	m	Surface
17/35	2,600	792	Asphalt

Statistics (2022)
- Aircraft operations (year ending 9/28/2022): 2,100
- Based aircraft: 3
- Source: Federal Aviation Administration

St. Thomas Municipal Airport (FAA LID: 4S5) is a public use airport located one nautical mile (2 km) northeast of the central business district of St. Thomas, a city in Pembina County, North Dakota, United States. It is owned by the St. Thomas Airport Authority.

== Facilities and aircraft ==
St. Thomas Municipal Airport covers an area of 50 acres (20 ha) at an elevation of 839 feet (256 m) above mean sea level. It has one runway designated 17/35 with an asphalt surface measuring 2,600 by 50 feet (792 x 15 m).

For the 12-month period ending September 28, 2022, the airport had 2,100 aircraft operations, an average of 40 per week: all general aviation. At that time there were 3 single-engine aircraft based at this airport.

== See also ==
- List of airports in North Dakota
