= Jamestown Regional Airport =

Airport in North Dakota, United States

Jamestown Regional Airport Admiral Don Weiss Field
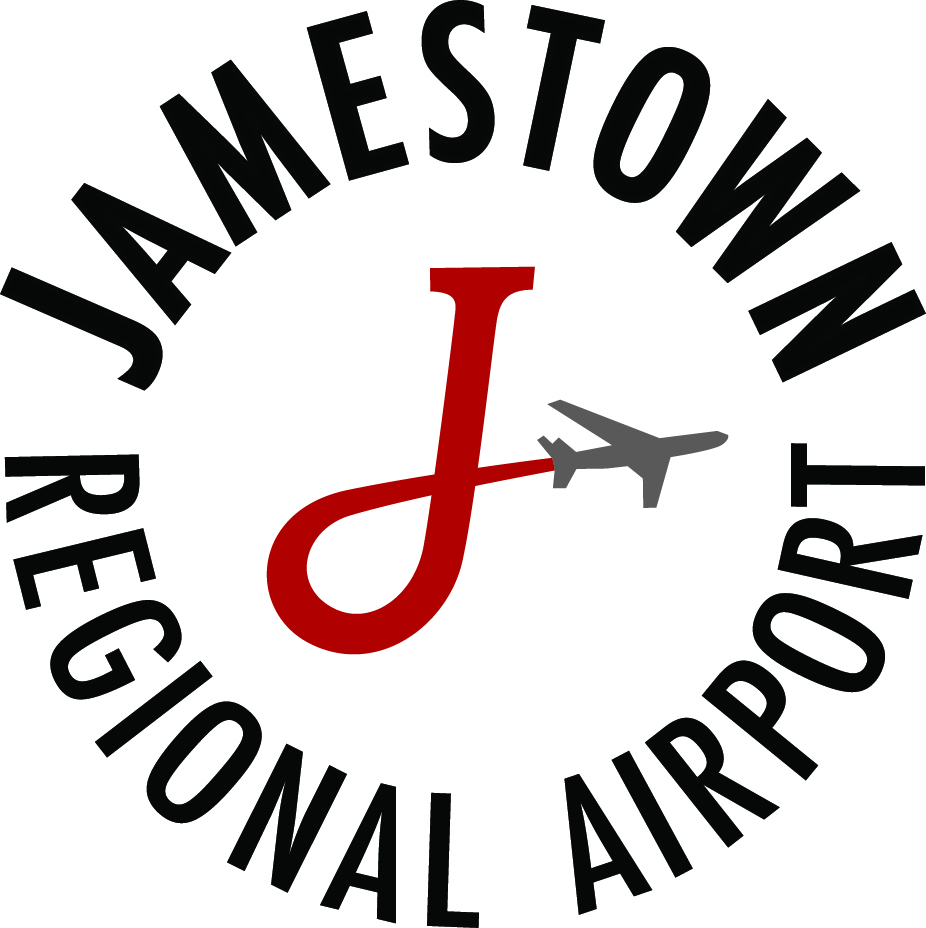
- IATA: JMS; ICAO: KJMS; FAA LID: JMS

Summary
- Airport type: Public
- Owner: Jamestown Regional Airport Authority
- Serves: Jamestown, North Dakota
- Elevation AMSL: 1,500 ft (460 m)
- Coordinates: 46°55′47″N 098°40′42″W
- Website: FlyJamestown.net

Map
- Location within North Dakota Location within the United States

Runways
Direction	Length		Surface
Direction	ft	m	Surface
13/31	6,502	1,982	Asphalt
4/22	5,750	1,753	Asphalt

Statistics (2019)
- Passengers: 24,000
- Aircraft operations: 11,916
- Based aircraft: 36
- Source: Bureau of Transportation Statistics, Federal Aviation Administration

Jamestown Regional Airport (IATA: JMS, ICAO: KJMS, FAA LID: JMS) is two miles northeast of Jamestown, in Stutsman County, North Dakota, United States. It is owned by the Jamestown Regional Airport Authority, and was formerly Jamestown Municipal Airport. It is used for general aviation and sees one airline, with flights twice each weekday and once on Saturdays and Sundays. Scheduled passenger service is subsidized by the Essential Air Service program.

Federal Aviation Administration records say the airport had 2,769 passenger boardings (enplanements) in calendar year 2008, 3,471 in 2009 and 4,434 in 2010. The National Plan of Integrated Airport Systems for 2011-2015 categorized it as a non-primary commercial service airport (between 2,500 and 10,000 enplanements per year).

== Facilities ==
The airport covers 1,500 acres (607 ha) at an elevation of 1,500 feet (457 m). It has two asphalt runways: 13/31 is 6,502 by 100 feet (1,982 x 30 m) and 4/22 is 5,750 by 75 feet (1,753 x 23 m).

In 2019 the airport had 11,916 aircraft operations, average 33 per day: 75% general aviation, 6% air taxi, 18% airline and <1% military. 36 aircraft were then based at this airport: 33 single-engine, 1 multi-engine, and 2 helicopter.

== Airline and destinations ==
Airlines	Destinations
United Express	Denver

United Express flies CRJ200s operated by SkyWest Airlines to Denver.

== Historical airline service ==
Northwest Airlines began flying to Jamestown in 1947 as one of many stops along a transcontinental route originating in either Seattle or Portland and terminating at either New York or Washington D.C. Northwest began its first scheduled jets in 1968 with the Boeing 727. Service ended in 1979 with airline deregulation and a series of smaller commuter airlines then served Jamestown.

Jamestown Aviation, Inc. began five day a week service on May 17, 1978, between Jamestown and Minneapolis, Minnesota with one daily round trip on a six-passenger twin-engine aircraft. This was in response to a Northwest pilot's strike that started on April 30, 1978, and the cancellation of Crystal Shamrock Airlines service on a route from Minneapolis, Fargo, Jamestown and Bismarck, North Dakota.

Air Wisconsin served Jamestown from 1979 through 1981 followed by Big Sky Airlines from 1981 through 1983.

Mesaba Airlines started service in late 1983 and began code sharing with Northwest Airlines as Northwest Airlink in 1985.

Great Lakes Airlines replaced Mesaba in 1991. Great Lakes operated as United Express on behalf of United Airlines from 1992 through 2002 then back under their own branding through 2003.

Mesaba returned as Northwest Airlink from 2003 through 2012 and became Delta Connection in 2010 upon the merger of Northwest Airlines into Delta Air Lines.

Great lakes returned under their own branding from 2012 through 2013 replacing Mesaba/Delta Connection.

SkyWest Airlines, operating as United Express, began their service in 2014 using Bombardier CRJ100/200 regional jets on flights to Denver. Up until this time, all previous carriers flew to Minneapolis/St. Paul with many flights making one or two stops en route.

=== Statistics ===
Top domestic destinations (December 2023 - November 2024)
Rank	Airport	Passengers	Airline
1	Denver, Colorado	8,980	United
2	Devils Lake, North Dakota	460	United

== See also ==
- List of airports in North Dakota

== Other sources ==
- Essential Air Service documents (Docket DOT-OST-1997-2785) from the U.S. Department of Transportation:
  - Order 2005-11-17 (November 22, 2005): selecting Mesaba Aviation, Inc., d/b/a Mesaba Airlines, to provide essential air service with Saab 340 aircraft at Devils Lake and Jamestown, North Dakota, for two years for annual subsidy rates of $1,329,858 at Devils Lake and $1,351,677 at Jamestown ($2,681,535 annually for both points combined).
  - Order 2007-8-16 (August 17, 2007): re-selects Mesaba Aviation, Inc., d/b/a Mesaba Airlines, operating as Northwest AirLink, to provide essential air service with Saab 340 aircraft at Devils Lake and Jamestown, North Dakota, for the two-year period of October 1, 2007, through September 30, 2008, for annual subsidy rates of $1,331,664 at Devils Lake and $1,355,011 at Jamestown ($2,685,675 annually for both points combined).
  - Order 2009-8-6 (August 11, 2009): re-selecting Mesaba Aviation, Inc., d/b/a Delta Connection, to provide Essential Air Service (EAS) with Saab 340 aircraft at Devils Lake and Jamestown, North Dakota, for the two-year period of October 1, 2009, through September 30, 2011, for annual subsidy rates of $1,459,493 at Devils Lake and $1,963,220 at Jamestown ($3,422,713 annually for both points combined).
  - Ninety Day Notice (July 15, 2011): of Mesaba Aviation, Inc. and Pinnacle Airlines, Inc. of termination of service at Devils Lake, ND and Jamestown, ND.
  - Order 2012-1-17 (January 23, 2012): selecting Great Lakes Aviation, Ltd. to provide Essential Air Service (EAS) at Jamestown, North Dakota, for an annual subsidy of $1,987,655, effective with the start of service by Great Lakes. We anticipate that Great Lakes will start service on or about March 12, 2012.
  - Order 2014-1-19 (January 30, 2014): selecting SkyWest Airlines (SkyWest) to provide Essential Air Service (EAS) at Devils Lake, North Dakota, for $3,224,917 annually, and Jamestown, North Dakota, for $3,126,564 annually, with service set at eleven (11) nonstop or one-stop round trips per week at each community to Denver International Airport (DEN).
