= Grenora, North Dakota =

- City
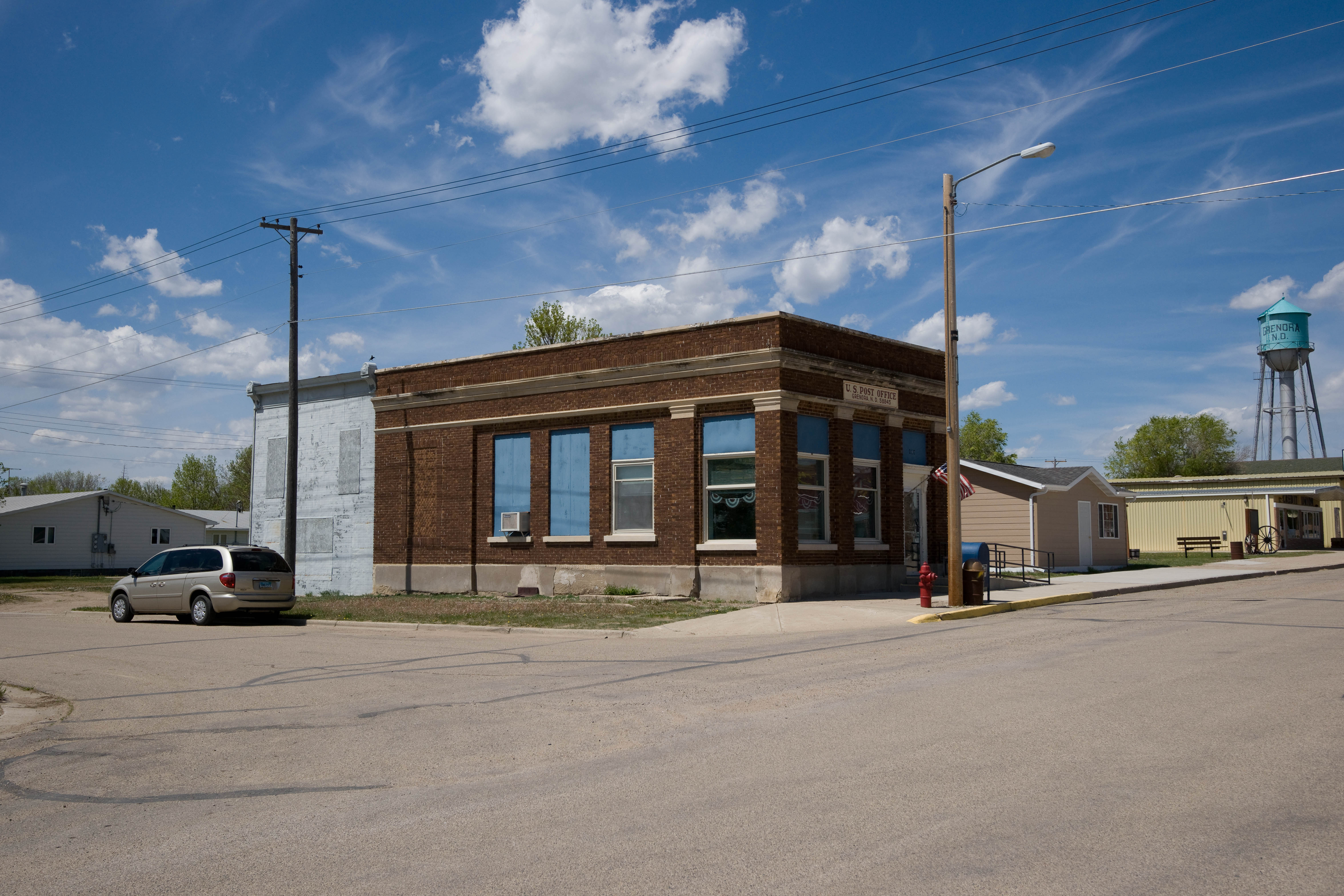

- Sign

- Location of Grenora, North Dakota
- Coordinates: 48°37′12″N 103°56′12″W
- Country: United States
- State: North Dakota
- County: Williams
- Founded: July 1916

Government
  - Mayor: Brett Wilkins

Area
  - Total: 0.61 sq mi (1.57 km^{2})
  - Land: 0.61 sq mi (1.57 km^{2})
  - Water: 0 sq mi (0.00 km^{2})
- Elevation: 2,130 ft (650 m)

Population (2020)
  - Total: 221
  - Estimate (2022): 209
  - Density: 363.7/sq mi (140.44/km^{2})
- Time zone: UTC-6 (Central (CST))
  - Summer (DST): UTC-5 (CDT)
- ZIP code: 58845
- Area code: 701
- FIPS code: 38-33500
- GNIS feature ID: 1036069
- Website: cityofgrenora.com

Grenora is a city in Williams County, North Dakota, United States. The population was 221 at the 2020 census.

Grenora was founded in July 1916 at the terminus of a Great Northern Railway branch line that began in Stanley. The name is a portmanteau of letters in the railway's name: GREat NOrthern RAilway. The tracks were in place until 2002, when Great Northern successor BNSF Railway filed for abandonment.

The city's motto is, "Friendliness lives here – you're only a stranger once." The city is home to a senior citizen's center, credit union, gas station, grain elevator, restaurant, bar, apartment buildings, and community-built low-income housing. There are also two churches: the St. Olaf Lutheran Church (ELCA), and St. Boniface Catholic Church.

== Demographics ==
Historical population
Census	Pop.	Note	%±
1920	358		—
1930	487		36.0%
1940	425		−12.7%
1950	525		23.5%
1960	448		−14.7%
1970	401		−10.5%
1980	362		−9.7%
1990	261		−27.9%
2000	202		−22.6%
2010	244		20.8%
2020	221		−9.4%
2022 (est.)	209		−5.4%
U.S. Decennial Census; 2020 Census

=== 2010 census ===
As of the census of 2010, there were 244 people, 98 households, and 65 families residing in the city. The population density was 400.0 inhabitants per square mile (154.4/km^{2}). There were 121 housing units at an average density of 198.4 per square mile (76.6/km^{2}). The racial makeup of the city was 97.5% White, 0.4% African American, 0.8% Native American, and 1.2% from two or more races. Hispanic or Latino of any race were 4.5% of the population.

There were 98 households, of which 30.6% had children under the age of 18 living with them, 52.0% were married couples living together, 9.2% had a female householder with no husband present, 5.1% had a male householder with no wife present, and 33.7% were non-families. 29.6% of all households were made up of individuals, and 13.3% had someone living alone who was 65 years of age or older. The average household size was 2.49 and the average family size was 3.09.

The median age in the city was 36.3 years. 30.3% of residents were under the age of 18; 3.7% were between the ages of 18 and 24; 26.3% were from 25 to 44; 25.8% were from 45 to 64; and 13.9% were 65 years of age or older. The gender makeup of the city was 48.0% male and 52.0% female.

=== 2000 census ===
As of the census of 2000, there were 202 people, 98 households, and 58 families residing in the city. The population density was 342.7 inhabitants per square mile (132.3/km^{2}). There were 139 housing units at an average density of 235.8 per square mile (91.0/km^{2}). The racial makeup of the city was 98.02% White, 0.99% Native American, and 0.99% from two or more races.

There were 98 households, out of which 17.3% had children under the age of 18 living with them, 55.1% were married couples living together, 3.1% had a female householder with no husband present, and 39.8% were non-families. 39.8% of all households were made up of individuals, and 23.5% had someone living alone who was 65 years of age or older. The average household size was 2.06 and the average family size was 2.76.

In the city, the population was spread out, with 18.3% under the age of 18, 5.0% from 18 to 24, 23.3% from 25 to 44, 24.3% from 45 to 64, and 29.2% who were 65 years of age or older. The median age was 48 years. For every 100 females, there were 124.4 males. For every 100 females age 18 and over, there were 126.0 males.

The median income for a household in the city was $26,250, and the median income for a family was $37,083. Males had a median income of $31,750 versus $15,625 for females. The per capita income for the city was $13,960. None of the families and 4.2% of the population were living below the poverty line, including no under eighteens and 9.6% of those over 64.

== Geography ==
=== Climate ===
This climatic region is typified by large seasonal temperature differences, with warm to hot (and often humid) summers and cold (sometimes severely cold) winters. According to the Köppen Climate Classification system, Grenora has a humid continental climate, abbreviated "Dfb" on climate maps.
