= Robertson Field (North Dakota) =

Airport in North Dakota, United States

- IATA: none; ICAO: none; FAA LID: D55

Summary
- Airport type: Public
- Owner: Langdon Airport Authority
- Serves: Langdon, North Dakota
- Elevation AMSL: 1,608 ft / 490 m
- Coordinates: 48°45′11″N 098°23′37″W

Map
- Location of airport in North Dakota D55 (the United States)

Runways
Direction	Length		Surface
Direction	ft	m	Surface
14/32	3,600	1,097	Asphalt
8/26	2,010	613	Turf

Statistics (2009)
- Aircraft operations: 3,750
- Based aircraft: 14
- Source: Federal Aviation Administration

Robertson Field (FAA LID: D55) is a public use airport located one nautical mile (2 km) west-southwest of the central business district of Langdon, a city in Cavalier County, North Dakota, United States. It is owned by the Langdon Airport Authority. This airport is included in the National Plan of Integrated Airport Systems for 2011–2015, which categorized it as a general aviation facility.

== Facilities and aircraft ==
Robertson Field covers an area of 100 acres (40 ha) at an elevation of 1,608 feet (490 m) above mean sea level. It has two runways: 14/32 is 3,600 by 60 feet (1,097 x 18 m) with an asphalt surface and 8/26 is 2,010 by 100 feet (613 x 30 m) with a turf surface.

For the 12-month period ending September 22, 2009, the airport had 3,750 aircraft operations, an average of 10 per day: 93.3% general aviation, 5.3% air taxi, and 1.3% military. At that time there were 14 aircraft based at this airport, all single-engine.

== See also ==
- List of airports in North Dakota
