= Murphy Lake =

Murphy Lake may refer to:

== United States ==
=== Colorado ===
- Haynach Lakes or Murphy Lakes in Grand County
- Snowdrift Lake or Murphy Lakes in Grand County

=== Florida ===
- Lake Murphy (Florida)

=== Georgia ===
- Murphy Lakes (Georgia), Catoosa County
- Lake Murphy (Colquitt County, Georgia)

=== Indiana ===
- J.C. Murphy Lake, Newton County

=== Louisiana ===
- Murphy Lake (Louisiana), Atchafalaya Basin

=== Michigan ===
- Murphy Lake (Berrien County, Michigan)
- Rollway Lake, Newaygo County
- Murphy Lake (Tuscola County, Michigan)

=== Minnesota ===
- Murphy Lake (Itasca County, Minnesota)
- Tin Can Mike Lake, Lake County

=== Montana ===
- Murphy Lake (Lincoln County, Montana)

=== New Mexico ===
- Morphy Lake (Mora County, New Mexico)

=== New York ===
- Murphy Lake (New York)

=== Oregon ===
- Fish Lake (Marion County, Oregon)
- Lake Murphy (Oregon), Lane County

=== Washington ===
- Lake Murphy (Washington), King County
- Murphy Lakes (Washington), King County
- Klinkhammer Lakes, Douglas County

=== Wisconsin ===
- Murphy Lake (Marinette County, Wisconsin)

=== Wyoming ===
- Murphy Lakes (Wyoming), Lincoln County

== See also ==
- Murphey Lake (disambiguation)
- Lake Murphy (disambiguation)
- Murphy Lakes (disambiguation)
