= Horseshoe Lake =

Horseshoe Lake may refer to:

== Canada ==
- Horseshoe Lake, Alberta
- Horseshoe Lake (Pipestone River, Kenora District), a lake downstream from the Frog Rapids on the Pipestone River in Kenora District, Ontario
- Horseshoe Lake, a community in Seguin Township, Ontario

== New Zealand ==
- Horseshoe Lake (Christchurch), a small oxbow lake formed by an old meander of the Avon River / Ōtākaro
- Horseshoe Lake, a lake east of Waipawa in the Hawkes Bay region
- Horseshoe Lake, southwest of Hanmer Springs in the Hurunui district

== United States ==
- Arizona
  - Horseshoe Lake (Arizona)
- Arkansas
  - Horseshoe Lake, Arkansas
  - Horseshoe Lake (Dallas County, Arkansas), a lake in Dallas County, Arkansas
- California
  - Horseshoe Lake, a lake in Bidwell Park, Chico
  - Horseshoe Lake (Mono County, California)
  - Horseshoe Lake (Shasta County, California)
- Illinois
  - Horseshoe Lake (Alexander County, Illinois)
  - Horseshoe Lake (Madison County, Illinois)
- Minnesota
  - Horseshoe Lake, a lake in Brown County, Minnesota
  - Horseshoe Lake (Chisago County, Minnesota)
  - Horseshoe Lake (Douglas County, Minnesota)
  - Horseshoe Lake (Isanti County, Minnesota)
  - Murphy Lake (Itasca County, Minnesota) or Horseshoe Lake
  - Horseshoe Lake, a lake in Le Sueur County, Minnesota
  - Horseshoe Lake, a lake in Scott County, Minnesota
  - Horseshoe Lake (Todd County, Minnesota)
  - Little Horseshoe Lake, a lake in Chisago County
- Montana
  - Horseshoe Lake, a lake in Beaverhead County, Montana
  - Horseshoe Lake, a lake in Cascade County, Montana
  - Horseshoe Lake, a lake in Phillips County, Montana
  - Horseshoe Lake, a lake in Roosevelt County, Montana
  - Horseshoe Lake, a lake in Sheridan County, Montana
  - Horseshoe Lake, a lake in Sweet Grass County, Montana
- New York
  - Horseshoe Lake (St. Lawrence County, New York)
- Texas
  - Horseshoe Lake, a lake in Brazos Bend State Park, Fort Bend County
  - Horseshoe Lake, south of Port Bolivar, north of Bolivar Point Lighthouse and Fort Travis, on the Bolivar Peninsula
- Washington
  - Horseshoe Lake, a lake in Cowlitz County
  - Horseshoe Lake (King County, Washington)
  - Horseshoe Lake (Kitsap County, Washington)
  - Horseshoe Lake (Skamania County, Washington)

== See also ==
- Oxbow lake
