= Murphy Lakes =

Murphy Lakes may refer to:

- Murphy Lakes (Georgia)
- Murphy Lakes (Washington)
- Murphy Lakes (Wyoming)
- Haynach Lakes
- Snowdrift Lake

== See also ==
- Murphy Lake (disambiguation)
