= Lake Murphy =

Lake Murphy may refer to:

- Lake Murphy (Florida)
- Lake Murphy (Oregon)
- Lake Murphy (Washington)
- Lake Murphy (Colquitt_County, Georgia)

== See also ==
- Murphy Lake (disambiguation)
