= Alvord Lake =

Alvord Lake may refer to:

- Alvord Lake (Arizona)
- Alvord Lake (Montana)
- Alvord Lake (Oregon)
- Alvord Lake, an artificial lake at the east end of Golden Gate Park, San Francisco, US
  - Alvord Lake Bridge
