= List of lakes of Lincoln County, Montana =

There are at least 163 named lakes and reservoirs in Lincoln County, Montana.

== Lakes ==
- Alkali Lake, 48°50′03″N 115°02′38″W, el. 2,986 feet (910 m)
- Alvord Lake, 48°29′43″N 115°53′09″W, el. 2,582 feet (787 m)
- Arnolds Pond, 48°55′07″N 115°14′00″W, el. 2,936 feet (895 m)
- Baboon Lake, 48°54′58″N 114°51′45″W, el. 6,191 feet (1,887 m)
- Baker Lake, 48°51′50″N 115°05′32″W, el. 2,904 feet (885 m)
- Baney Lake, 48°57′02″N 115°08′14″W, el. 2,513 feet (766 m)
- Baree Lake, 47°57′38″N 115°32′27″W, el. 5,512 feet (1,680 m)
- Barnaby Lake, 48°46′46″N 114°58′23″W, el. 3,031 feet (924 m)
- Bear Lake, 48°41′44″N 115°02′06″W, el. 5,423 feet (1,653 m)
- Bear Lakes, 47°58′56″N 115°31′23″W, el. 5,479 feet (1,670 m)
- Betts Lake, 48°19′50″N 115°02′39″W, el. 2,949 feet (899 m)
- Big Cherry Lake, 48°10′14″N 115°40′51″W, el. 5,869 feet (1,789 m)
- Big Therriault Lake, 48°56′12″N 114°52′43″W, el. 5,551 feet (1,692 m)
- Big Therriault Lake, 48°56′00″N 114°52′36″W, el. 5,600 feet (1,700 m)
- Black Lake, 48°52′51″N 115°06′33″W, el. 2,753 feet (839 m)
- Black Lake, 48°46′40″N 114°52′39″W, el. 3,091 feet (942 m)
- Blue Lake, 48°32′02″N 115°26′57″W, el. 3,894 feet (1,187 m)
- Bluebird Lake, 48°56′44″N 114°55′58″W, el. 6,831 feet (2,082 m)
- Bootjack Lake, 48°05′06″N 115°09′05″W, el. 3,350 feet (1,020 m)
- Boulder Lakes, 48°50′06″N 115°26′46″W, el. 6,069 feet (1,850 m)
- Bowen Lake, 48°29′50″N 114°54′19″W, el. 5,118 feet (1,560 m)
- Bramlet Lake, 48°01′47″N 115°33′13″W, el. 5,581 feet (1,701 m)
- Bruin Lake, 48°47′22″N 114°41′12″W, el. 6,188 feet (1,886 m)
- Bull Lake, 48°14′45″N 115°50′49″W, el. 2,329 feet (710 m)
- Bull Lake, 48°40′19″N 114°43′56″W, el. 3,642 feet (1,110 m)
- China Lake, 48°30′15″N 115°44′30″W, el. 5,869 feet (1,789 m)
- Costich Lake, 48°53′14″N 115°01′08″W, el. 2,851 feet (869 m)
- Crater Lake, 48°18′57″N 115°39′55″W, el. 6,398 feet (1,950 m)
- Crystal Lake, 48°47′00″N 114°52′51″W, el. 2,992 feet (912 m)
- Crystal Lake, 48°04′28″N 115°08′29″W, el. 3,350 feet (1,020 m)
- Deep Lake, 48°43′51″N 114°57′11″W, el. 3,314 feet (1,010 m)
- Dickey Lake, 48°42′42″N 114°48′52″W, el. 3,113 feet (949 m)
- Double Lake, 48°15′49″N 115°43′20″W, el. 5,367 feet (1,636 m)
- Double N Lake, 48°15′22″N 115°30′34″W, el. 2,746 feet (837 m)
- Dry Lake, 48°45′41″N 114°54′56″W, el. 2,930 feet (890 m)
- Duck Lake, 48°27′42″N 115°52′15″W, el. 2,421 feet (738 m)
- Eli Lake, 48°03′00″N 115°05′52″W, el. 3,343 feet (1,019 m)
- Fish Lake, 48°40′33″N 114°43′28″W, el. 3,691 feet (1,125 m)
- Fish Lakes, 48°53′04″N 115°34′21″W, el. 3,655 feet (1,114 m)
- Flower Lake, 48°21′19″N 115°37′47″W, el. 3,829 feet (1,167 m)
- Frank Lake, 48°48′03″N 115°00′22″W, el. 3,136 feet (956 m)
- Geiger Lakes, 48°00′53″N 115°32′23″W, el. 4,741 feet (1,445 m)
- Glen Lake, 48°51′51″N 114°57′04″W, el. 2,963 feet (903 m)
- Gold Lake, 48°59′22″N 115°25′53″W, el. 5,955 feet (1,815 m)
- Granite Lake, 48°14′55″N 115°41′23″W, el. 4,610 feet (1,410 m)
- Green Lake, 48°52′27″N 115°07′07″W, el. 2,959 feet (902 m)
- Gregor Lake, 48°52′38″N 115°04′30″W, el. 2,772 feet (845 m)
- Grob Lake, 48°55′56″N 115°08′13″W, el. 2,510 feet (770 m)
- Grouse Lake, 48°22′20″N 115°53′46″W, el. 2,936 feet (895 m)
- Hagadore Lake, 48°44′16″N 114°50′16″W, el. 3,356 feet (1,023 m)
- Hawkins Lakes, 48°58′08″N 115°57′37″W, el. 6,581 feet (2,006 m)
- Herrig Lake, 48°42′05″N 114°40′03″W, el. 6,060 feet (1,850 m)
- Hidden Lake, 48°40′17″N 114°47′39″W, el. 3,376 feet (1,029 m)
- Hidden Lake, 48°54′02″N 116°02′11″W, el. 6,270 feet (1,910 m)
- Homes Lake, 48°45′23″N 114°56′23″W, el. 3,176 feet (968 m)
- Horse Lakes, 48°40′17″N 115°31′55″W, el. 4,268 feet (1,301 m)
- Horseshoe Lake, 48°04′52″N 115°10′11″W, el. 3,350 feet (1,020 m)
- Hoskins Lake, 48°53′13″N 115°38′13″W, el. 3,356 feet (1,023 m)
- Howard Lake, 48°05′55″N 115°31′41″W, el. 4,101 feet (1,250 m)
- Island Lake, 48°14′32″N 114°58′20″W, el. 3,514 feet (1,071 m)
- Jumbo Lake, 48°40′02″N 114°47′06″W, el. 3,323 feet (1,013 m)
- Kearney Lake, 48°52′24″N 115°04′45″W, el. 2,782 feet (848 m)
- Kilbrennan Lake, 48°35′25″N 115°53′25″W, el. 2,904 feet (885 m)
- Klatawa Lake, 48°17′25″N 115°43′17″W, el. 5,292 feet (1,613 m)
- La Foe Lake, 48°37′04″N 115°41′05″W, el. 3,829 feet (1,167 m)
- Lake Florence, 48°55′58″N 115°59′22″W, el. 6,279 feet (1,914 m)
- Lake Geneva, 48°58′54″N 115°24′44″W, el. 6,545 feet (1,995 m)
- Lake Livermore (historical), 48°55′18″N 115°10′28″W, el. 2,464 feet (751 m)
- Lake Osakis, 48°19′28″N 115°39′33″W, el. 6,122 feet (1,866 m)
- Lake Rene, 48°44′37″N 115°41′45″W, el. 3,779 feet (1,152 m)
- Lavon Lake, 48°04′50″N 115°08′47″W, el. 3,350 feet (1,020 m)
- Leigh Lake, 48°13′17″N 115°40′02″W, el. 5,148 feet (1,569 m)
- Leon Lake, 48°04′49″N 115°10′45″W, el. 3,373 feet (1,028 m)
- Libby Lakes, 48°04′39″N 115°38′05″W, el. 6,785 feet (2,068 m)
- Lick Lake, 48°51′29″N 114°55′47″W, el. 3,091 feet (942 m)
- Lilypad Lake, 48°05′12″N 115°09′33″W, el. 3,356 feet (1,023 m)
- Little Loon Lake, 48°04′31″N 115°11′49″W, el. 3,343 feet (1,019 m)
- Little Sparr Lake, 48°12′48″N 116°00′52″W, el. 5,243 feet (1,598 m)
- Little Therriault Lake, 48°56′28″N 114°53′25″W, el. 5,518 feet (1,682 m)
- L-Lake, 48°52′58″N 115°05′19″W, el. 2,772 feet (845 m)
- Long Lake, 48°49′19″N 114°59′48″W, el. 2,874 feet (876 m)
- Loon Lake, 48°43′50″N 114°55′43″W, el. 3,268 feet (996 m)
- Loon Lake, 48°05′03″N 115°11′24″W, el. 3,343 feet (1,019 m)
- Loon Lake, 48°35′58″N 115°40′43″W, el. 3,612 feet (1,101 m)
- Lost Lake, 48°49′22″N 115°01′02″W, el. 2,920 feet (890 m)
- Lost Lake, 48°03′44″N 115°02′52″W, el. 3,789 feet (1,155 m)
- Lost Lake, 48°16′36″N 115°22′46″W, el. 3,858 feet (1,176 m)
- Lower Cedar Lake, 48°22′37″N 115°44′32″W, el. 5,525 feet (1,684 m)
- Lower Thompson Lake, 48°01′11″N 115°02′00″W, el. 3,333 feet (1,016 m)
- Madden Lake, 48°52′59″N 115°08′13″W, el. 2,844 feet (867 m)
- Marl Lake, 48°44′29″N 114°57′18″W, el. 3,284 feet (1,001 m)
- Martin Lake, 48°44′40″N 114°50′08″W, el. 3,340 feet (1,020 m)
- Martin Lake, 48°11′10″N 115°40′36″W, el. 5,259 feet (1,603 m)
- Middle Thompson Lake, 48°01′52″N 115°04′27″W, el. 3,333 feet (1,016 m)
- Miller Lake, 47°55′33″N 115°16′56″W, el. 3,547 feet (1,081 m)
- Milnor Lake, 48°24′55″N 115°49′35″W, el. 2,260 feet (690 m)
- Minor Lake, 48°20′52″N 115°43′45″W, el. 5,328 feet (1,624 m)
- Moose Lake, 48°28′24″N 115°52′35″W, el. 2,477 feet (755 m)
- Moran Lake (Montana), 48°57′21″N 115°06′23″W, el. 2,500 feet (760 m)
- Morgan Lake (Montana), 48°50′40″N 115°04′42″W, el. 3,022 feet (921 m)
- Mount Henry Lakes, 48°53′21″N 115°30′39″W, el. 6,109 feet (1,862 m)
- Mud Lake, 48°25′28″N 115°51′11″W, el. 2,198 feet (670 m)
- Mud Lake, 48°51′23″N 115°10′28″W, el. 2,956 feet (901 m)
- Murphy Lake, 48°44′05″N 114°51′33″W, el. 2,999 feet (914 m)
- Myron Lake, 48°05′56″N 115°11′53″W, el. 4,009 feet (1,222 m)
- O'Brien Lake, 48°52′53″N 115°07′33″W, el. 2,831 feet (863 m)
- Okaga Lake, 48°56′00″N 115°35′21″W, el. 3,317 feet (1,011 m)
- Othorp Lake, 48°51′10″N 115°05′58″W, el. 3,022 feet (921 m)
- Ozette Lake, 48°02′11″N 115°35′16″W, el. 5,502 feet (1,677 m)
- Paradise Lake, 48°56′33″N 114°55′37″W, el. 6,719 feet (2,048 m)
- Phills Lake, 48°51′24″N 115°12′08″W, el. 2,913 feet (888 m)
- Plumb Bob Lake, 48°58′17″N 115°24′44″W, el. 6,614 feet (2,016 m)
- Rainbow Lake, 48°03′56″N 115°07′27″W, el. 3,340 feet (1,020 m)
- Rainbow Lake, 48°04′12″N 115°07′45″W, el. 3,353 feet (1,022 m)
- Rainbow Lake, 48°38′44″N 115°39′37″W, el. 4,193 feet (1,278 m)
- Ramsey Lake, 48°06′29″N 115°36′33″W, el. 4,429 feet (1,350 m)
- Rattlebone Lake, 48°41′26″N 114°48′36″W, el. 3,337 feet (1,017 m)
- Rock Lake, 48°49′33″N 115°00′30″W, el. 2,900 feet (880 m)
- Rock Lake, 48°51′08″N 115°11′29″W, el. 3,035 feet (925 m)
- Rush Lake, 48°56′23″N 115°13′10″W, el. 2,739 feet (835 m)
- Sales Lake, 48°56′39″N 115°08′30″W, el. 2,516 feet (767 m)
- Savage Lake, 48°25′14″N 115°49′04″W, el. 2,280 feet (690 m)
- Schoolhouse Lake, 48°25′07″N 115°51′07″W, el. 2,182 feet (665 m)
- Schrieber Lake, 48°06′14″N 115°24′27″W, el. 3,035 feet (925 m)
- Shannon Lake, 48°26′32″N 115°47′37″W, el. 2,507 feet (764 m)
- Sky Lakes, 48°19′05″N 115°42′56″W, el. 6,201 feet (1,890 m)
- Slee Lake, 48°28′48″N 115°52′42″W, el. 2,523 feet (769 m)
- Snowshoe Lakes, 48°12′07″N 115°39′38″W, el. 5,643 feet (1,720 m)
- Sophie Lake, 48°57′50″N 115°06′58″W, el. 2,516 feet (767 m)
- Spar Lake, 48°15′49″N 115°56′51″W, el. 3,297 feet (1,005 m)
- Spruce Lake, 48°17′50″N 115°59′28″W, el. 4,104 feet (1,251 m)
- Standard Lake, 48°05′02″N 115°31′44″W, el. 3,862 feet (1,177 m)
- Summerville Lake, 48°47′53″N 115°00′27″W, el. 3,182 feet (970 m)
- Swisher Lake, 48°58′05″N 115°07′57″W, el. 2,493 feet (760 m)
- Sylvan Lake, 47°54′49″N 115°16′46″W, el. 3,586 feet (1,093 m)
- Tahoka Lake, 48°10′52″N 115°40′35″W, el. 5,430 feet (1,660 m)
- Tepee Lake, 48°09′45″N 115°24′29″W, el. 4,193 feet (1,278 m)
- Tepee Lake, 48°47′17″N 115°06′04″W, el. 4,400 feet (1,300 m)
- Tetrault Lake, 48°56′46″N 115°06′58″W, el. 2,513 feet (766 m)
- Thirsty Lake, 48°50′49″N 115°03′22″W, el. 2,940 feet (900 m)
- Thompson Lakes, 48°02′13″N 115°05′00″W, el. 3,333 feet (1,016 m)
- Throop Lake, 48°26′42″N 115°49′04″W, el. 1,942 feet (592 m)
- Timber Lake, 48°48′51″N 115°00′03″W, el. 3,012 feet (918 m)
- Tom Poole Lake, 48°35′44″N 115°36′18″W, el. 3,425 feet (1,044 m)
- Tooley Lake, 48°57′16″N 115°12′05″W, el. 2,543 feet (775 m)
- Turtle Lake, 48°50′37″N 115°03′52″W, el. 3,022 feet (921 m)
- Upper Bramlet Lake, 48°01′37″N 115°33′43″W, el. 6,020 feet (1,830 m)
- Upper Cedar Lake, 48°22′26″N 115°45′02″W, el. 5,896 feet (1,797 m)
- Upper Thompson Lake, 48°03′11″N 115°06′52″W, el. 3,333 feet (1,016 m)
- Vimy Lake, 48°15′27″N 115°43′37″W, el. 6,056 feet (1,846 m)
- Vinal Lake, 48°51′03″N 115°39′29″W, el. 2,940 feet (900 m)
- Weasel Lake, 48°56′47″N 114°44′01″W, el. 5,627 feet (1,715 m)
- Wee Lake, 48°37′01″N 115°48′21″W, el. 5,308 feet (1,618 m)
- Whitney Lake, 47°55′18″N 115°11′27″W, el. 3,976 feet (1,212 m)
- Wishbone Lake, 48°15′30″N 115°42′30″W, el. 5,397 feet (1,645 m)
- Wolverine Lakes, 48°58′10″N 114°55′19″W, el. 6,834 feet (2,083 m)

== Reservoirs ==
- Bass Lake, 48°49′26″N 114°57′29″W, el. 2,753 feet (839 m)
- Costich Lake, 48°53′24″N 115°01′16″W, el. 2,851 feet (869 m)
- Lake Koocanusa, 48°24′42″N 115°18′34″W, el. 2,464 feet (751 m)
- Obermayer Lake, 48°49′00″N 115°43′23″W, el. 3,104 feet (946 m)
- Troy City Reservoir, 48°27′25″N 115°51′03″W, el. 2,106 feet (642 m)
- Troy Dam Reservoir, 48°26′18″N 115°52′34″W, el. 2,287 feet (697 m)

== See also ==
- List of lakes in Montana
