= Colquitt County, Georgia =

County in Georgia, United States

- County
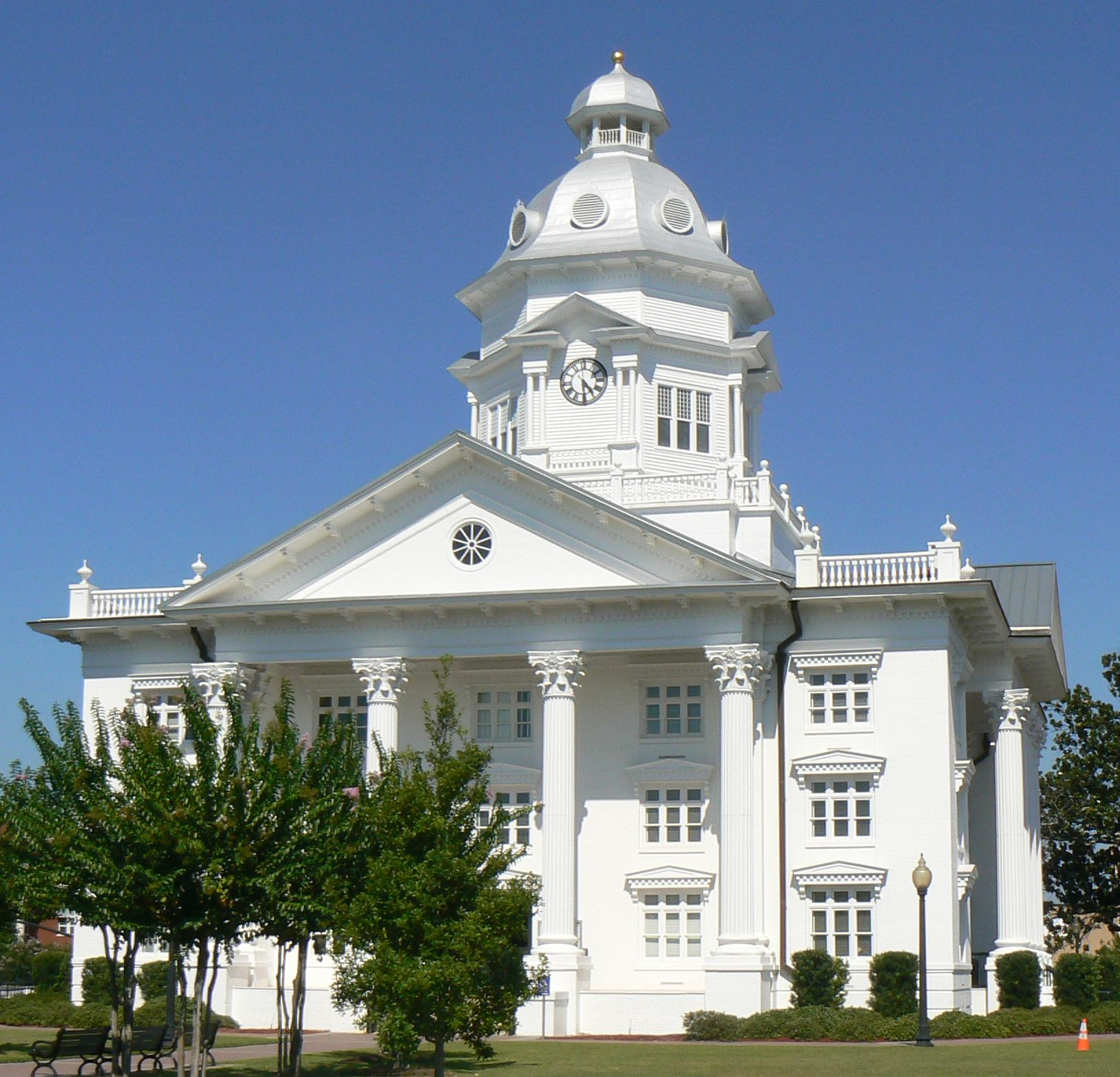
- Colquitt County Courthouse in Moultrie

- Seal

- Location within the U.S. state of Georgia
- Coordinates: 31°11′N 83°46′W
- Country: United States
- State: Georgia
- Founded: 1856; 170 years ago
- Named for: Walter Terry Colquitt
- Seat: Moultrie
- Largest city: Moultrie

Area
  - Total: 557 sq mi (1,440 km^{2})
  - Land: 544 sq mi (1,410 km^{2})
  - Water: 12 sq mi (31 km^{2}) 2.2%

Population (2020)
  - Total: 45,898
  - Estimate (2025): 47,438 ▲
  - Density: 84/sq mi (32/km^{2})
- Time zone: UTC−5 (Eastern)
  - Summer (DST): UTC−4 (EDT)
- Congressional district: 8th
- Website: colquittcountyga.gov

Colquitt County is a county in the U.S. state of Georgia. As of the 2020 census, the population was 45,898. The county seat is Moultrie. The county was created on February 25, 1856, and is named for Walter Terry Colquitt, a U.S. senator. Colquitt County comprises the Moultrie, GA micropolitan statistical area.

== Geography ==
According to the U.S. Census Bureau, the county has a total area of 557 square miles (1,440 km^{2}), of which 544 square miles (1,410 km^{2}) is land and 12 square miles (31 km^{2}) (2.2%) is water. It is located in Southwest Georgia.

Most of the western portion of Colquitt County, west of Moultrie and State Route 33, is located in the Upper Ochlockonee River sub-basin of the larger Ochlockonee River basin, except for the very northwestern corner of the county, between Sale City and west of Doerun, which is located in the Lower Flint River sub-basin of the ACF River Basin (Apalachicola-Chattahoochee-Flint River Basin). A narrow central portion of Colquitt County, running from north to south of Moultrie, and then widening to occupy the gap between U.S. Route 319 and State Route 133, is located in the Withlacoochee River sub-basin of the Suwannee River basin. The eastern portion of the county is located in the Little River sub-basin of the same Suwannee River basin.

=== Lakes ===
- Gray Lake
- Lake Murphy

=== Major highways ===
- U.S. Route 319 / State Route 35
  - U.S. Route 319 Business
- State Route 33
- State Route 37
- State Route 111
- State Route 133
- State Route 202
- State Route 256
- State Route 270
  - State Route 270 Spur

=== Adjacent counties ===
- Tift County (northeast)
- Cook County (east)
- Brooks County (southeast)
- Thomas County (southwest)
- Mitchell County (west)
- Worth County (northwest)

== Communities ==
=== Cities ===
- Berlin
- Doerun
- Ellenton
- Funston
- Moultrie
- Norman Park

=== Unincorporated communities ===
- Autreyville
- Barbers
- Hartsfield
- Murphy
- Riverside

== Demographics ==
Historical population
| Census | Pop. | Note | %± |
|---|---|---|---|
| 1860 | 1,316 | | — |
| 1870 | 1,654 | | 25.7% |
| 1880 | 2,527 | | 52.8% |
| 1890 | 4,794 | | 89.7% |
| 1900 | 13,636 | | 184.4% |
| 1910 | 19,789 | | 45.1% |
| 1920 | 29,332 | | 48.2% |
| 1930 | 30,622 | | 4.4% |
| 1940 | 33,012 | | 7.8% |
| 1950 | 33,999 | | 3.0% |
| 1960 | 34,048 | | 0.1% |
| 1970 | 32,200 | | −5.4% |
| 1980 | 35,376 | | 9.9% |
| 1990 | 36,645 | | 3.6% |
| 2000 | 42,053 | | 14.8% |
| 2010 | 45,498 | | 8.2% |
| 2020 | 45,898 | | 0.9% |
| 2025 (est.) | 47,438 | ▲ | 3.4% |
U.S. Decennial Census; 1790-1880 1890-1910; 1920-1930 1930-1940; 1940-1950 1960-1980; 1980-2000 2010 2020

=== Racial and ethnic composition ===
Colquitt County, Georgia – Racial and ethnic composition Note: the US Census treats Hispanic/Latino as an ethnic category. This table excludes Latinos from the racial categories and assigns them to a separate category. Hispanics/Latinos may be of any race.
| Race / Ethnicity (NH = Non-Hispanic) | Pop 1980 | Pop 1990 | Pop 2000 | Pop 2010 | Pop 2020 | % 1980 | % 1990 | % 2000 | % 2010 | % 2020 |
|---|---|---|---|---|---|---|---|---|---|---|
| White alone (NH) | 26,837 | 26,155 | 27,252 | 26,759 | 25,588 | 75.86% | 71.37% | 64.80% | 58.81% | 55.75% |
| Black or African American alone (NH) | 8,083 | 8,791 | 9,812 | 10,143 | 9,995 | 22.85% | 23.99% | 23.33% | 22.29% | 21.78% |
| Native American or Alaska Native alone (NH) | 26 | 64 | 77 | 100 | 83 | 0.07% | 0.17% | 0.18% | 0.22% | 0.18% |
| Asian alone (NH) | 59 | 39 | 89 | 289 | 388 | 0.17% | 0.11% | 0.21% | 0.64% | 0.85% |
| Native Hawaiian or Pacific Islander alone (NH) | x | x | 8 | 12 | 15 | x | x | 0.02% | 0.03% | 0.03% |
| Other race alone (NH) | 9 | 8 | 19 | 42 | 106 | 0.03% | 0.02% | 0.05% | 0.09% | 0.23% |
| Mixed race or Multiracial (NH) | x | x | 242 | 390 | 1,014 | x | x | 0.58% | 0.86% | 2.21% |
| Hispanic or Latino (any race) | 362 | 1,588 | 4,554 | 7,763 | 8,709 | 1.02% | 4.33% | 10.83% | 17.06% | 18.97% |
| Total | 35,376 | 36,645 | 42,053 | 45,498 | 45,898 | 100.00% | 100.00% | 100.00% | 100.00% | 100.00% |

=== 2020 census ===
As of the 2020 census, there were 45,898 people, 17,172 households, and 10,663 families residing in the county.

Of the residents, 25.5% were under the age of 18 and 16.7% were 65 years of age or older; the median age was 37.9 years. For every 100 females, there were 97.0 males, and for every 100 females age 18 and over, there were 93.7 males. 41.9% of residents lived in urban areas, and 58.1% lived in rural areas.

The racial makeup of the county was 59.4% White, 21.9% Black or African American, 0.9% American Indian and Alaska Native, 0.8% Asian, 0.0% Native Hawaiian and Pacific Islander, 10.5% from some other race, and 6.5% from two or more races. Hispanic or Latino residents of any race comprised 19.0% of the population.

There were 17,172 households in the county, of which 33.9% had children under the age of 18 living with them, and 31.2% had a female householder with no spouse or partner present. About 27.1% of all households were made up of individuals, and 12.5% had someone living alone who was 65 years of age or older.

There were 19,105 housing units, of which 10.1% were vacant. Among occupied housing units, 61.1% were owner-occupied, and 38.9% were renter-occupied. The homeowner vacancy rate was 1.2,% and the rental vacancy rate was 6.5%.

== Education ==
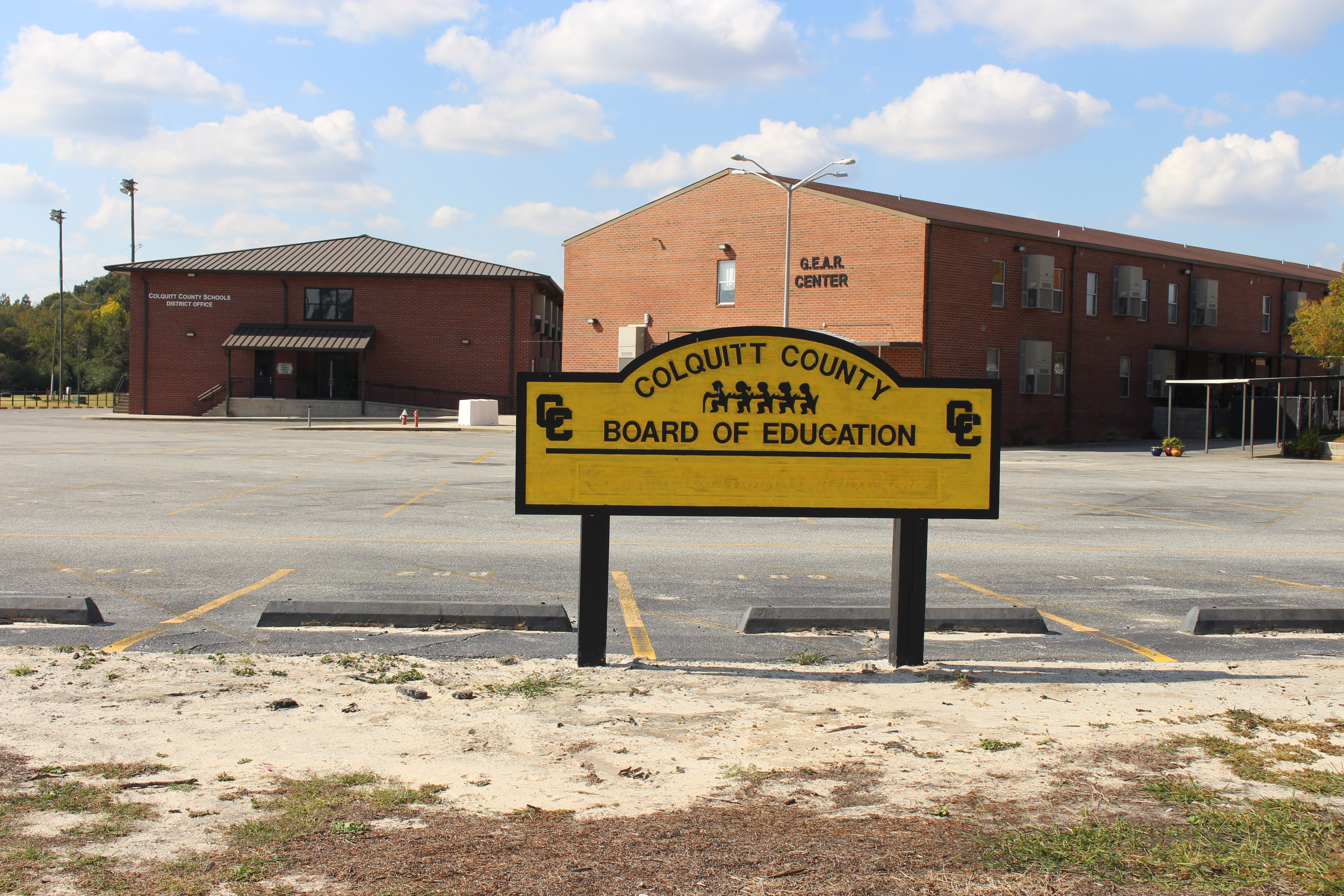
Colquitt County School District headquarters

Colquitt County School District operates public schools, with Colquitt County High School being the high school.

== Politics ==
As of the 2020s, Colquitt County is a Republican stronghold, voting 75% for Donald Trump in 2024. For elections to the United States House of Representatives, Colquitt County is part of Georgia's 8th congressional district, currently represented by Austin Scott. For elections to the Georgia State Senate, Colquitt County is part of District 11. For elections to the Georgia House of Representatives, Colquitt County is part of District 172.

United States presidential election results for Colquitt County, Georgia
| Year | Republican | | Democratic | | Third party(ies) | |
| Year | No. | % | No. | % | No. | % |
|---|---|---|---|---|---|---|
| 1912 | 8 | 0.66% | 699 | 57.58% | 507 | 41.76% |
| 1916 | 53 | 3.47% | 1,305 | 85.35% | 171 | 11.18% |
| 1920 | 523 | 40.51% | 768 | 59.49% | 0 | 0.00% |
| 1924 | 205 | 10.67% | 1,572 | 81.79% | 145 | 7.54% |
| 1928 | 796 | 45.07% | 970 | 54.93% | 0 | 0.00% |
| 1932 | 101 | 2.77% | 3,534 | 96.77% | 17 | 0.47% |
| 1936 | 448 | 15.44% | 2,449 | 84.42% | 4 | 0.14% |
| 1940 | 525 | 22.24% | 1,819 | 77.04% | 17 | 0.72% |
| 1944 | 696 | 23.17% | 2,308 | 76.83% | 0 | 0.00% |
| 1948 | 537 | 15.50% | 2,255 | 65.08% | 673 | 19.42% |
| 1952 | 1,411 | 23.80% | 4,517 | 76.20% | 0 | 0.00% |
| 1956 | 1,336 | 23.24% | 4,412 | 76.76% | 0 | 0.00% |
| 1960 | 1,685 | 27.70% | 4,397 | 72.30% | 0 | 0.00% |
| 1964 | 6,493 | 71.67% | 2,563 | 28.29% | 4 | 0.04% |
| 1968 | 1,882 | 20.18% | 1,119 | 12.00% | 6,325 | 67.82% |
| 1972 | 6,900 | 88.12% | 930 | 11.88% | 0 | 0.00% |
| 1976 | 2,181 | 23.94% | 6,928 | 76.06% | 0 | 0.00% |
| 1980 | 3,593 | 39.62% | 5,353 | 59.03% | 123 | 1.36% |
| 1984 | 5,815 | 64.45% | 3,208 | 35.55% | 0 | 0.00% |
| 1988 | 5,653 | 65.04% | 2,998 | 34.50% | 40 | 0.46% |
| 1992 | 4,680 | 45.54% | 3,891 | 37.86% | 1,705 | 16.59% |
| 1996 | 4,847 | 48.51% | 4,135 | 41.38% | 1,010 | 10.11% |
| 2000 | 6,589 | 66.08% | 3,297 | 33.06% | 86 | 0.86% |
| 2004 | 8,296 | 70.59% | 3,378 | 28.74% | 78 | 0.66% |
| 2008 | 9,185 | 68.27% | 4,139 | 30.76% | 130 | 0.97% |
| 2012 | 9,243 | 69.25% | 3,973 | 29.77% | 131 | 0.98% |
| 2016 | 9,898 | 72.65% | 3,463 | 25.42% | 263 | 1.93% |
| 2020 | 11,777 | 73.21% | 4,190 | 26.05% | 119 | 0.74% |
| 2024 | 12,451 | 74.96% | 4,114 | 24.77% | 46 | 0.28% |

United States Senate election results for Colquitt County, Georgia2
| Year | Republican | | Democratic | | Third party(ies) | |
| Year | No. | % | No. | % | No. | % |
|---|---|---|---|---|---|---|
| 2020 | 11,644 | 73.27% | 3,990 | 25.11% | 257 | 1.62% |
| 2020 | 10,339 | 73.57% | 3,714 | 26.43% | 0 | 0.00% |

United States Senate election results for Colquitt County, Georgia3
| Year | Republican | | Democratic | | Third party(ies) | |
| Year | No. | % | No. | % | No. | % |
|---|---|---|---|---|---|---|
| 2020 | 6,562 | 41.58% | 2,531 | 16.04% | 6,689 | 42.38% |
| 2020 | 10,330 | 73.49% | 3,727 | 26.51% | 0 | 0.00% |
| 2022 | 9,390 | 74.83% | 2,966 | 23.64% | 192 | 1.53% |
| 2022 | 8,678 | 75.66% | 2,791 | 24.34% | 0 | 0.00% |

Georgia Gubernatorial election results for Colquitt County
| Year | Republican | | Democratic | | Third party(ies) | |
| Year | No. | % | No. | % | No. | % |
|---|---|---|---|---|---|---|
| 2022 | 9,860 | 78.27% | 2,684 | 21.30% | 54 | 0.43% |

== See also ==
- National Register of Historic Places listings in Colquitt County, Georgia
- List of counties in Georgia
