= Michael Lake =

Michael or Mike Lake is the name of:

== People ==
- Mike Lake (politician) (born 1969), Canadian politician
- Mike Lake (footballer) (born 1966), English football (soccer) player
- Michael Lake, former member of the Australian alternative rock band Adam Said Galore
- Michael Lake, designer of the Jamaica theme of the World's Fair/Universal Exposition, Seville Expo '92

== Lakes ==
- Tin Can Mike Lake, a lake in Minnesota

== See also ==
- Michael (disambiguation)
- Lake (disambiguation) § People
