= Murphey Lake =

Murphey Lake may refer to:

- Murphy Lake (Newaygo County, Michigan)
- Rollway Lake

== See also ==
- Murphy Lake (disambiguation)
