= Luigi and Aurora Pagani House =

Historic home in King County, WA

- U.S. National Register of Historic Places
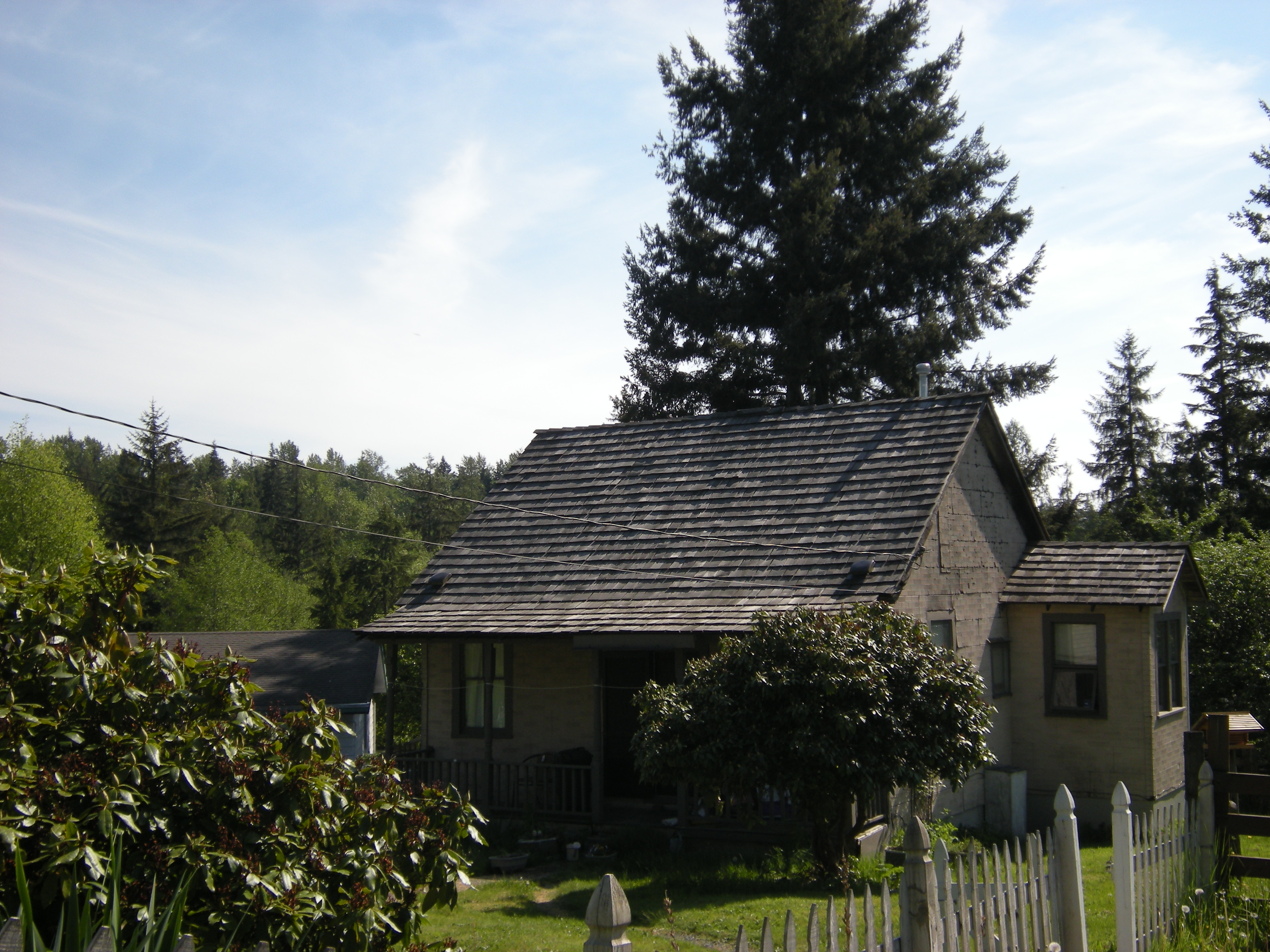
- The house, typical of the houses of 1890s immigrant Italian coal miners in this area.

- Location within Washington (state)
- Location: 32907 Merino St., Black Diamond, Washington
- Coordinates: 47°18′24″N 122°00′23″W
- Area: 1.6 acres (0.65 ha)
- Built: c. 1896
- Architectural style: Vernacular architecture
- NRHP reference No.: 02000861
- Added to NRHP: August 9, 2002

The Luigi and Aurora Pagani House is a historic house in Black Diamond, Washington built circa 1896. It is named for Italian immigrants Luigi and Aurora (née Regali) Pagani, who leased and later owned the home, after they settled in Black Diamond where Luigi worked as a coal miner. Constructed by the Black Diamond Coal Mining Company on land acquired by the Homestead Act, the home is an example of vernacular architecture and features a one-story, side-gabled roof.

After immigrating from Italy in 1909, the couple raised two daughters in Black Diamond; Katie and Louisa. Luigi was killed in a mining accident in 1912 and Aurora lived in the home until her death in 1971. They are both buried in the nearby Black Diamond Cemetery.

In 2001 the house was designated as a Black Diamond Landmark by the King County Historic Preservation Program. The property has been listed on the National Register of Historic Places since 2002.

The home is privately owned and not open to the public.
