= Snag Lake =

Lake in the state of California, United States

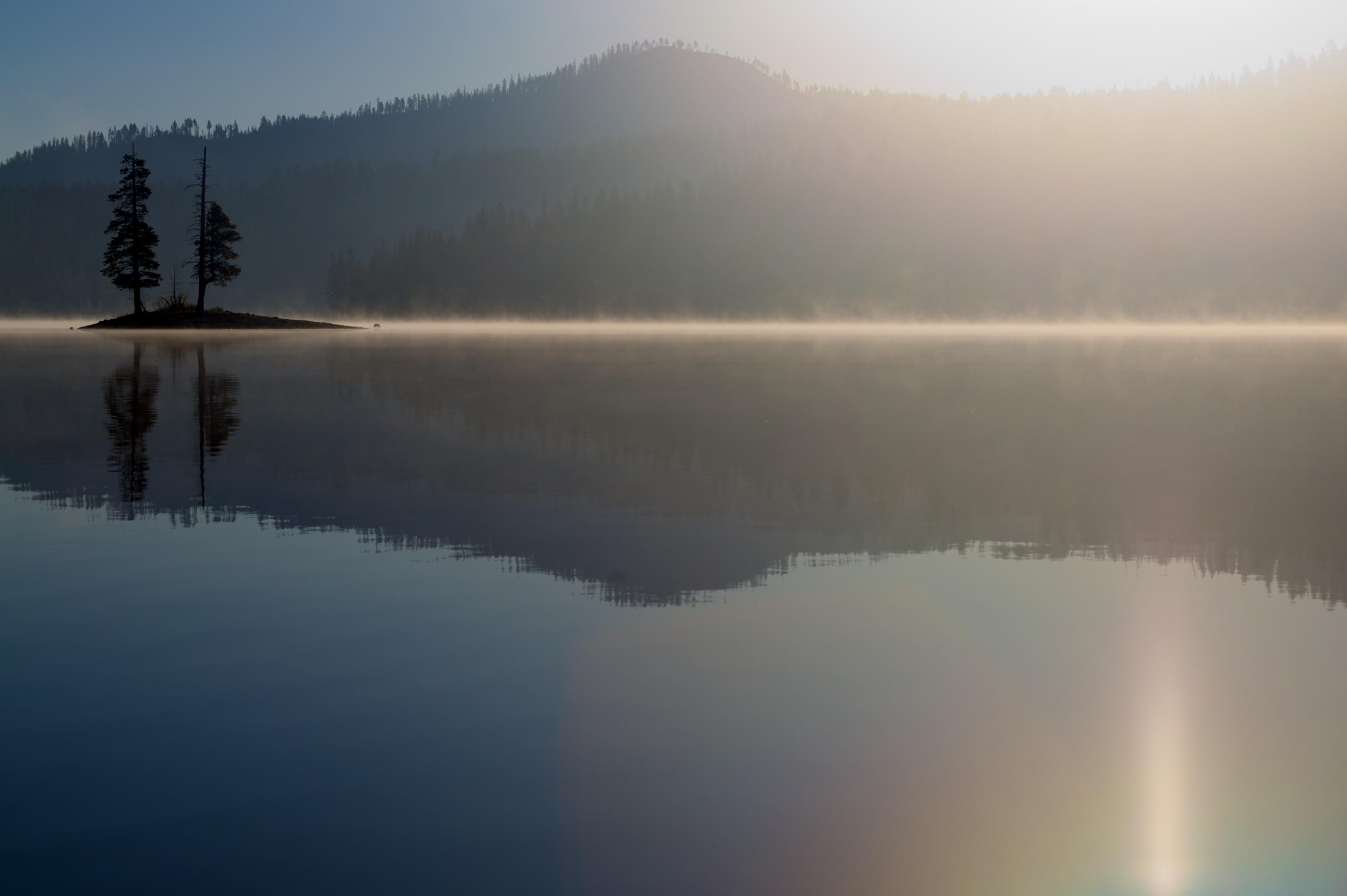

- Location within California Location within the United States
- Location: Lassen Volcanic National Park, Lassen County, California, US
- Coordinates: 40°30′50″N 121°18′42″W
- Basin countries: United States
- Surface elevation: 6,050 ft (1,840 m)

Snag Lake is a lake located in the northeastern part of Lassen Volcanic National Park in California, United States.

== Description ==
Snag Lake, a large body of water, is located to the south of Cinder Cone and the Fantastic Lava Beds at an elevation of 6,050 ft (1,840 m). Water from the nearby Horseshoe Lake empties into Snag Lake via Grassy Creek. Water from Snag Lake continues to flow through the porous lava field that led to the lake's creation eventually making its way into Butte Lake.

== Access ==
Snag Lake is accessible by hiking trail only.

== See also ==
- List of lakes in California
