= Mel Parnell =

American baseball player (1922–2012)

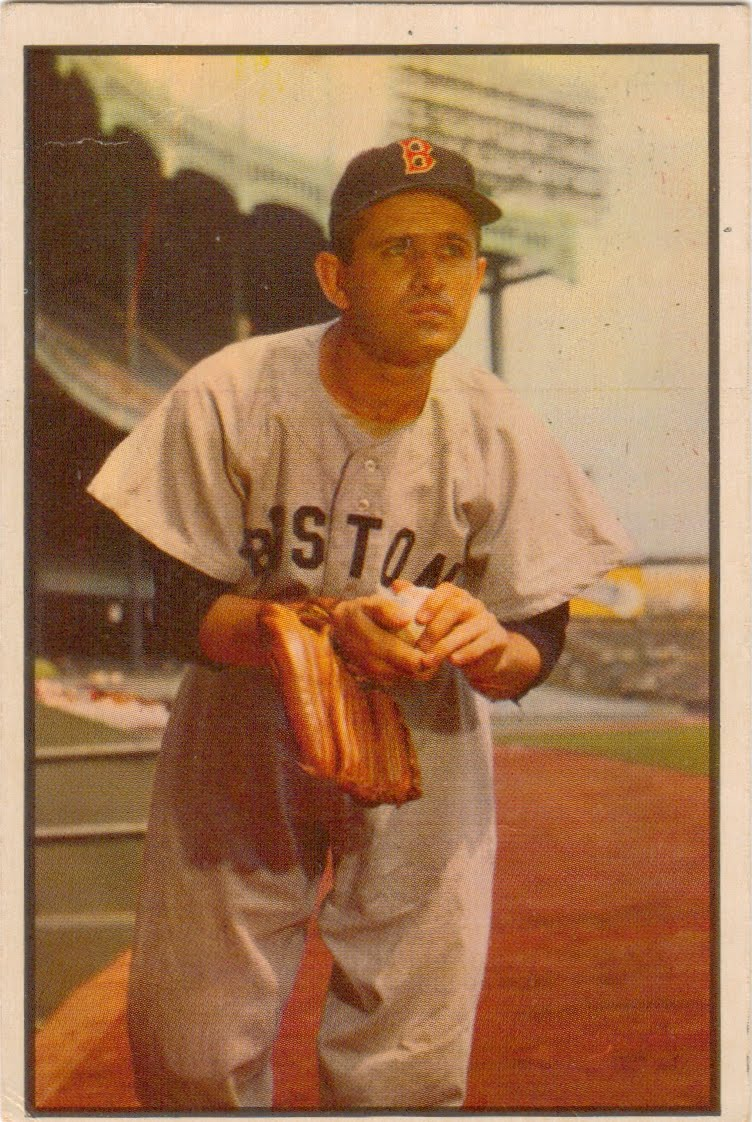
- Pitcher
- Born: June 13, 1922; New Orleans, Louisiana, U.S.
- Died: March 20, 2012 (aged 89); New Orleans, Louisiana, U.S.
- Batted: Left Threw: Left

MLB debut
- April 20, 1947, for the Boston Red Sox

Last MLB appearance
- September 29, 1956, for the Boston Red Sox

MLB statistics
- Win–loss record: 123–75
- Earned run average: 3.50
- Strikeouts: 732
- Stats at Baseball Reference

Teams
- Boston Red Sox (1947–1956)

Career highlights and awards
- 2× All-Star (1949, 1951); AL wins leader (1949); Pitched a no-hitter on July 14, 1956; Boston Red Sox Hall of Fame

Melvin Lloyd Parnell (June 13, 1922 – March 20, 2012) was an American professional baseball pitcher who spent his entire Major League Baseball (MLB) career with the Boston Red Sox. Listed at 6 feet 0 inches (1.83 m) and 180 pounds (82 kg), he threw and batted left-handed.

== Playing career ==
Parnell spent his entire ten-year career with the Boston Red Sox (1947–1956), compiling a 123–75 record with 732 strikeouts, a 3.50 earned run average, 113 complete games, 20 shutouts, and 1752 2/3 innings pitched in 289 games (232 as a starter). He has the third-highest career winning percentage for a left-hander at Fenway Park (minimum 25 decisions), at 71–30 (.703).

Parnell was also an above-average hitting pitcher, posting a .198 batting average (132-for-668) with 52 runs, 1 home run, 50 RBIs, and 29 bases on balls. Defensively, he was solid, recording a .971 fielding percentage, 13 points above the league average for his position.

Parnell enjoyed his best season in 1949, going 25–7, leading the league in wins, complete games (27), and innings pitched (295 1/3), and finishing second with a 2.77 ERA. He was the starting pitcher for the American League in that year's All-Star Game and was selected again in 1951.

Following two 18-win seasons in 1950 and 1951, and a 12–12 record in 1952, Parnell went 21–8 in 1953 with a 3.06 ERA and a career-high 136 strikeouts. On July 14, 1956, he pitched a no-hitter against the Chicago White Sox, winning 4–0 at Fenway Park. This no-hitter was the first by a Red Sox pitcher since Howard Ehmke in 1923. It would be the final highlight of Parnell's career, which ended prematurely after the 1956 season due to a torn muscle in his pitching arm. It took 52 years for another Red Sox left-hander, Jon Lester, to throw a no-hitter, which he achieved in 2008.

Parnell still holds the Red Sox career record for left-handed pitchers in games started, innings pitched, and victories.

Parnell once remarked that a southpaw's biggest challenge at Fenway Park was the limited foul territory, not the wall. It is commonly said that following a victory in Fenway during which Johnny Pesky hit a game-winning home run near the right-field foul pole, Parnell named it "Pesky's Pole." However, research shows that Pesky hit only one home run in a game pitched by Parnell, a two-run shot in the first inning of a game against Detroit on June 11, 1950. The Tigers eventually won that game in the 14th inning with a three-run homer by Tigers' right fielder Vic Wertz, and Parnell earned a no-decision.

== Post-playing career ==
After his playing career, Parnell managed the New Orleans Pelicans of the Class AA Southern Association in 1959 and several Red Sox farm teams from 1961 to 1963.

From 1965 to 1968, Parnell was a member of Boston's radio and television announcing crew and later joined the Chicago White Sox’ television crew in 1969. He called the final out of the last regular-season game of the 1967 Red Sox "Impossible Dream" season on WHDH-TV:

"Little soft pop-up...Petrocelli will take it...he does! The ball game is over! The Red Sox win it! And what a mob on this field! They're coming out of the stands from all over!"

Parnell was mentioned in Terry Cashman's 1981 song "Talkin' Baseball".

In 1997, he was inducted into the Boston Red Sox Hall of Fame. Parnell resided in New Orleans until his death in 2012 after a long battle with cancer.

== See also ==
- List of Major League Baseball players who spent their entire career with one franchise

Preceded by Carl Erskine	No-hitter pitcher July 14, 1956	Succeeded by Sal Maglie
Preceded by Ray Yochim	New Orleans Pelicans manager 1959	Succeeded by Franchise relocated
Preceded by Johnny Pesky	Seattle Rainiers manager 1963	Succeeded by Edo Vanni
