= Autreyville, Georgia =

Unincorporated community in Georgia, U.S.

Coordinates: 31°03′45″N 83°45′54″W

Autreyville is an unincorporated community in Colquitt County, in the U.S. state of Georgia.

== History ==
Autreyville was named after D. A. Autrey, a local merchant. A post office called Autreyville was established in 1893, and remained in operation until 1951. In 1900, the community had 136 inhabitants. The community once had a schoolhouse, now defunct.

== Geography ==
Autreyville is located on SR 33 8 miles south of Moultrie, 23 miles northeast from Thomasville 7 miles north from Pavo, and 39 miles northwest from Valdosta.
