= Edo Vanni =

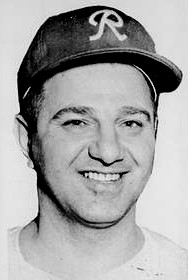
- Born: April 2, 1918; Black Diamond, Washington, US
- Died: April 30, 2007 (aged 89); Bellevue, Washington, US
- Other name: Edo Joe Vanni
- Occupations: Baseball player, coach, manager

Edo Joe Vanni (April 2, 1918 – April 30, 2007) was an American player, coach, manager and front office executive in minor league baseball. A lifelong resident of the Seattle area, he was called "the face of Seattle baseball" upon his death, at 89, of heart failure in Bellevue, Washington, on April 30, 2007.

== Career ==
Vanni attended Seattle's Queen Anne High School and the University of Washington (where he played freshman football) before beginning his professional playing career as an outfielder with the 1938 Seattle Rainiers of the Pacific Coast League. He was an integral player of their pennant-winning teams of 1939–41. Vanni threw and batted left-handed and was listed as 5 feet 10 inches (1.78 m) tall and 180 pounds (82 kg).

During World War II, Vanni was stationed at the Pasco (Wash.) Naval Air Station, where he managed the station's baseball team, called the Flyers. Vanni played 11 seasons for the Rainiers, worked in their front office, and managed them in 1964 when they were the top affiliate of the Boston Red Sox.

He also played and managed in the Class A Western International League with the Vancouver Capilanos (1952) and the Kennewick-based Tri-City Braves (1953–54) and the Class B Northwest League, the WIL's successor, with the Wenatchee Chiefs (1955–56).

After he hung up his uniform, he was the general manager of the Triple-A Seattle Angels (1965–68), and worked in the front office as director of group ticket sales for the Seattle Pilots during their lone American League season, 1969. The Seattle Mariners gave him a lifetime pass to their stadium, and his own parking space.

Seattle baseball historian Dave Eskenazi called him "the dean of Seattle baseball."

| Preceded by Mel Parnell | Seattle Rainiers manager 1964 | Succeeded by Bob Lemon (Seattle Angels) |
