= Butte Lake (California) =

Lake in the state of California, United States

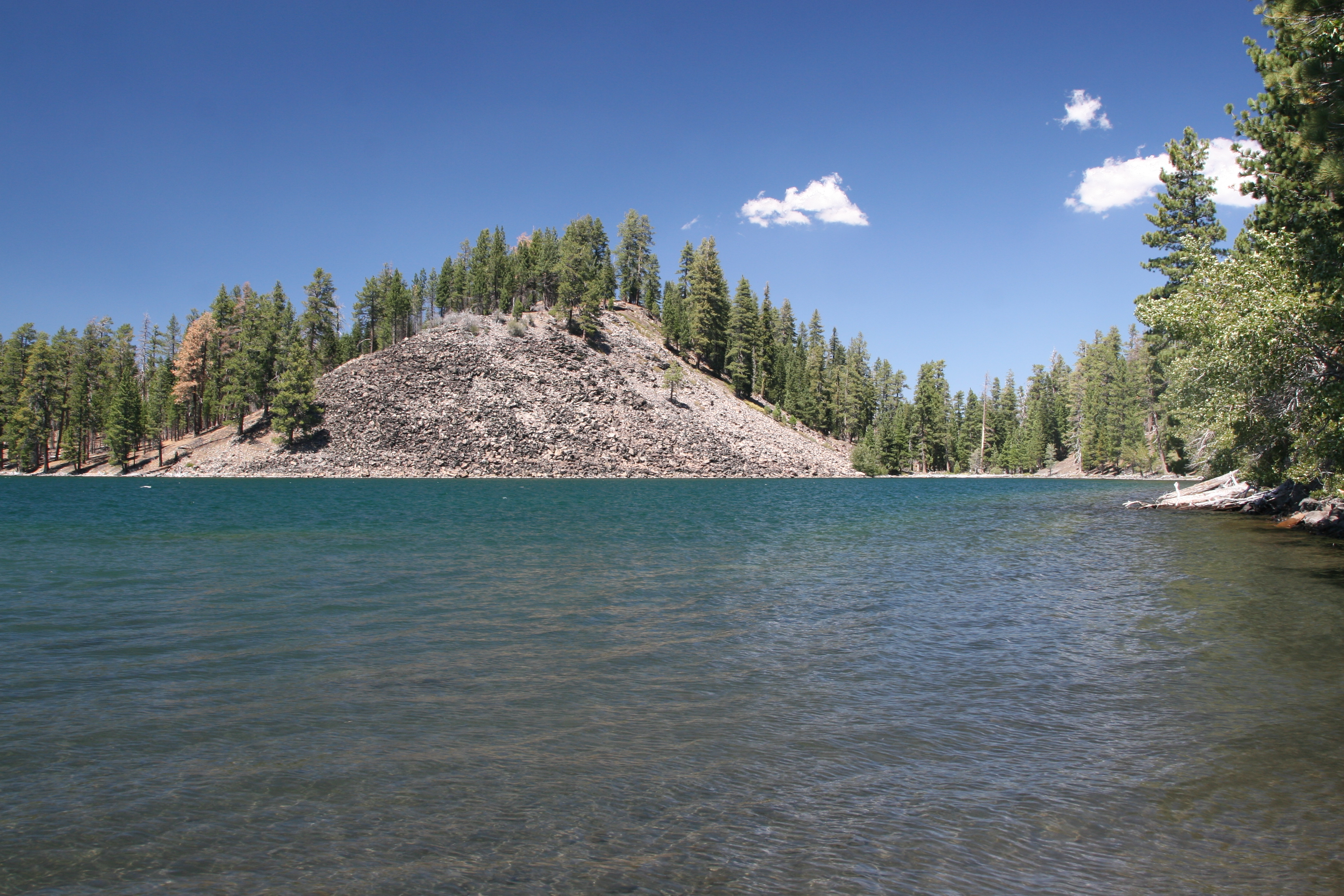

- Location within California Location within the United States
- Location: Lassen Volcanic National Park; Lassen County, California
- Coordinates: 40.562108°N 121.289694°W
- Type: Lake
- Primary inflows: Butte Creek
- Basin countries: United States
- Surface elevation: 1,845 m (6,053 ft)

Butte Lake is a lake located in the northeast section of Lassen Volcanic National Park in the U.S. state of California at an elevation of 6,053 ft (1,845 m).

== Description ==
The irregularly-shaped lake lies at the northern end of Cinder Cone and the Fantastic Lava Beds, which is a complex of lava flows and a cinder cone. Lava from Cinder Cone's 1666 eruption flowed into and around the lake. This formed an underwater lava field. Water from Snag Lake to the south flows through the porous lava field to Butte Lake. Water from Butte Lake drains via Butte Creek, which flows north out of the parkland.

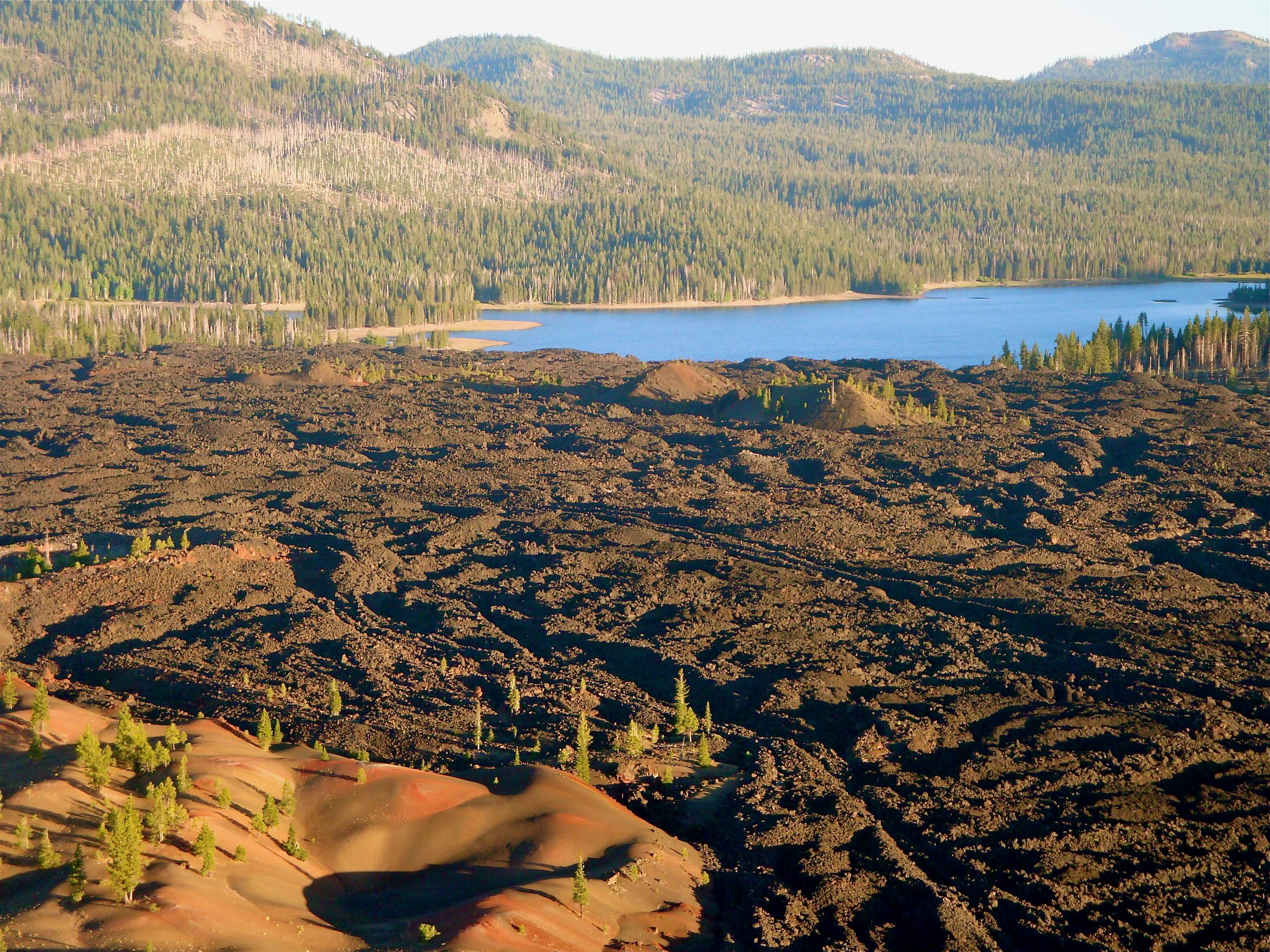
Butte Lake from Cinder Cone

== Access ==
There is a campground and ranger station located to the west of the lake. Butte Lake is accessible via an unpaved road which branches off from California Route 44. The unpaved road is subject to seasonal closures.

== See also ==
- List of lakes in California
- Cascade Volcanoes
