= Black Diamond, Washington =

- City
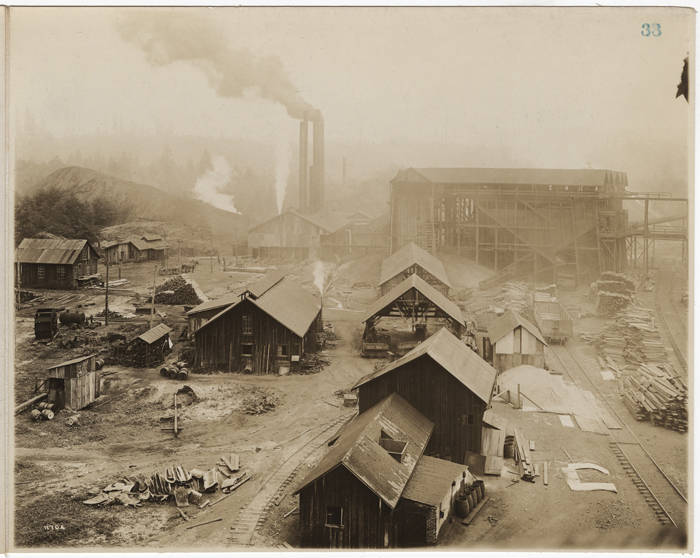
- Top Works at Mine 11, Black Diamond, ca. 1915.
- Interactive map of Black Diamond, Washington
- Location within Washington (state)
- Coordinates: 47.3121°N 122.0174°W
- Country: United States
- State: Washington
- County: King
- Established: mid-1880s
- Incorporated: February 19, 1959

Government
  - Type: Mayor–Council
  - Mayor: John Adler
  - City Administrator: Kevin O'Neill
  - City Clerk: Brenda L. Martinez
  - Councilmembers: Tamie Deady; Sara Nielsen; Darcey Peterson; Jesse Young; Dan Dal Santo; Ryan Reed

Area
  - Total: 7.193 sq mi (18.630 km^{2})
  - Land: 6.598 sq mi (17.090 km^{2})
  - Water: 0.595 sq mi (1.541 km^{2}) 8.27%
- Elevation: 560 ft (170 m)

Population (2020)
  - Total: 4,697
  - Estimate (2025): 6,978
  - Density: 711.8/sq mi (274.8/km^{2})
- Time zone: UTC–8 (Pacific (PST))
  - Summer (DST): UTC–7 (PDT)
- ZIP Code: 98010
- Area codes: 360 and 564
- FIPS code: 53-06330
- GNIS feature ID: 2409855
- Highway: SR 169
- Website: blackdiamondwa.gov

Black Diamond is a city in King County, Washington, United States. The population was 4,697 as of the 2020 census,, and was estimated at 6,978 in 2025. In 2025, with a 48.6% growth rate, Black Diamond was the fastest growing small city in King County.

== History ==
=== Founding ===
Black Diamond was originally inhabited by the Bəqəlšuł, which is Lushootseed for "from a high point from which you can see", part of Coast Salish people. The area was home to a grill trap and smokehouse, and the tribe fished from Lake Sawyer.

Black Diamond was officially incorporated on February 19, 1959. The town's late 20th century population growth has been mostly as a commuter community for people with jobs in Seattle, Bellevue, and suburban centers within the Seattle Metropolitan Area.

=== Coal mining ===
Beginning in the 1880s Black Diamond was a rural coal mining area, developed by the Black Diamond Coal Mining Company of California, which owned and operated the mine. The original residents were largely composed of former workers, from the company's previous coal mining operation in Nortonville, California, which primarily sold coal to the thriving new metropolis of San Francisco. A combination of low quality coal from the Nortonville mines, water intrusion into the workings there, and the discovery and economical transport of higher-quality Washington coal to San Francisco spelled the demise of Nortonville in the early 1880s. The town was home to around 3,500 people by the early 1900s, many of them European immigrants; most of the working men were involved in producing coal. This coal was transported to Seattle via the Pacific Coast Coal train. Before 1911, the miners were affiliated with the United Mine Workers of America (UMWA), but by March 1911 had left en masse to join the Industrial Workers of the World (IWW).

After World War I, the town shut down the mine as it was no longer viable. A second mining boom spurred growth in the town in the early 1930s on the strength of multiple mining operations promoted by the Morris brothers through the Palmer Coking Coal Company. Mining has continued until recently through the Pacific Coast Coal Company, formerly of San Francisco.

The main building of the Black Diamond Historical Museum is the former train station, which served the Seattle and Walla Walla Railroad 1884–1916 and the Pacific Coast Railway 1916–1951. Regular passenger service ended in 1925, but a train still brought men to the mine until 1931, and trains continued to haul coal and freight into the 1940s.

=== Planned growth via master planned developments (MPDs) ===
In the 1990's, the first Black Diamond city planner (Jason Paulsen), seized an opportunity to create a comprehensive development plan for the City of Black Diamond that when completed, would fundamentally change what and how the City of Black Diamond would evolve into — the first set of plans being the Growth Management Act (GMA) Comprehensive Plan, which included the concept of Master Planned Developments (MPDs).

In 2008 156 acres (63 ha) were purchased for the first MPD. In 2010 the first MPDs applications were filed with the City of Black Diamond.

==== Legal action against first MPDs ====
From 2010 through 2018 legal battles were fought delaying development of the first MPDs:

- In 2010 Toward Responsible Development filed a land use petition (LUPA) against the first two MPDs.
- In 2012 King County Superior Court denied the LUPA Toward Responsible Development filed with the Court of Appeals.
- In 2014 appeals Court Commissioner Masako Kanazawa ordered Toward Responsible Development to pay a total of $162,798, for attorney fees and costs, to YarrowBay and the City of Black Diamond.
- In 2016 Oakpointe (formerly YarrowBay) sued three City of Black Diamond Council members who opposed the MPDs.
- In 2017 Black Diamond council files suit against the mayor.
- In 2018 Black Diamond / Oakpointe settle lawsuit.

==== First MPDs ====
The first two MPDs comprised 6,050 single and multi-family residences, 1.1 million square feet of commercial/office/retail space and were estimated to 15,000 new residents to the City of Black Diamond; which would increase the population of the city by 3.6 times its size at the time (2010 population estimate of 4,151).

In December 2013 development started on the first MPD; known as Ten Trails. In 2019 the first family moves into Ten Trails.

In 2021, with a 21% growth rate, Black Diamond was the fastest growing small city in King County.

In March 2022, 845 households were occupied in Ten Trails (722 residential homes, 76 apartment units, and 47 rental homes).

Using King County's 2020 Person's per household rate of 2.43, 845 households being occupied in Ten Trails in March 2022, the estimated population of Black Diamond in 2022 being 6,336, concludes the estimated population living in Ten Trails in March 2022 being 2,053 (845 * 2.43); which roughly equates to 79% (2,053 / 6,336) of the population of Black Diamond living in the first MPD (Ten Trails) during March 2022.

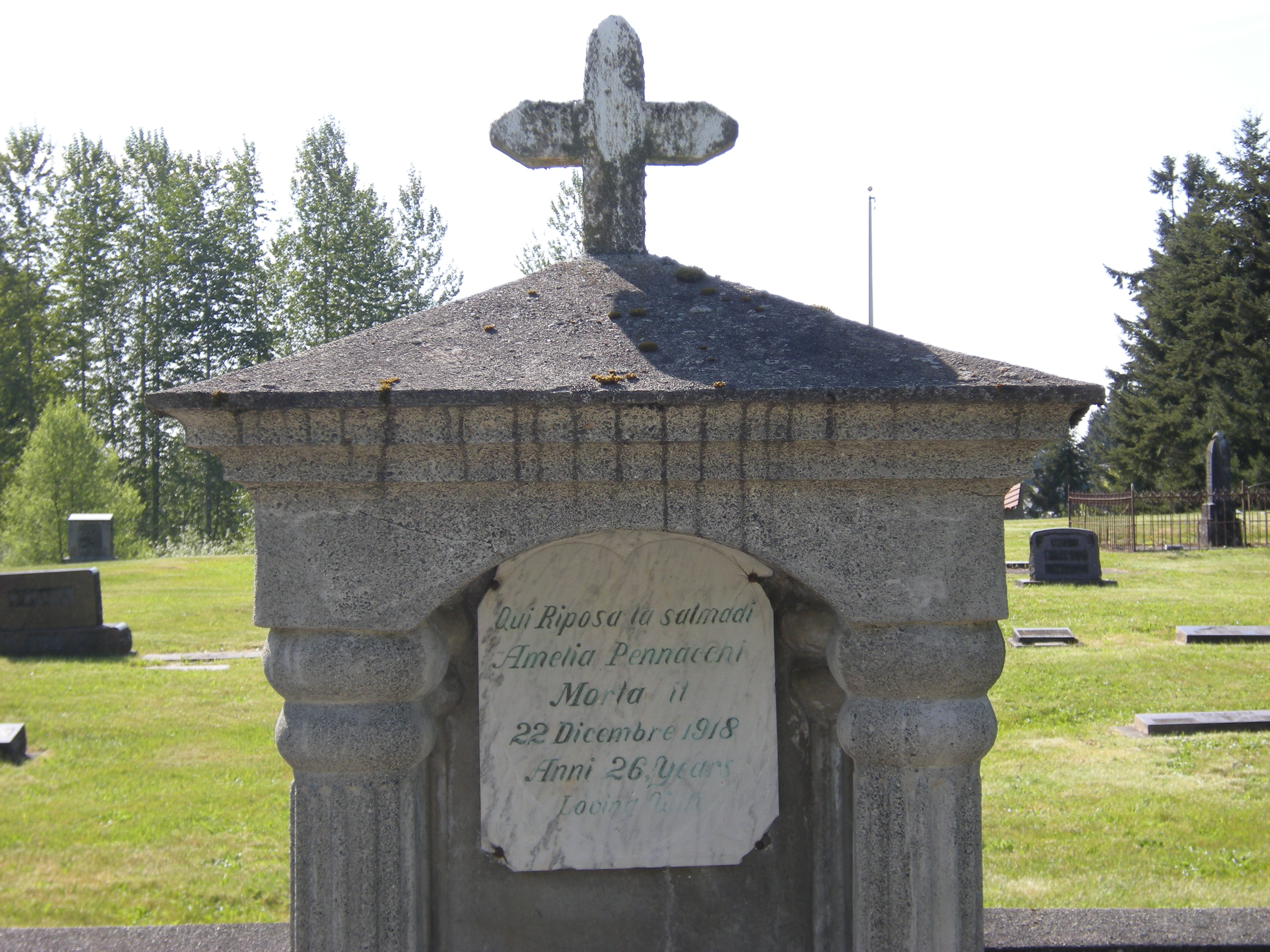
Many early residents of Black Diamond came from Italy; this is one of many grave markers in the Black Diamond Cemetery with an Italian-language inscription. The cemetery is listed on the National Register of Historic Places.

== Geography ==
According to the United States Census Bureau, the city has an area of 7.193 square miles (18.63 km^{2}), of which 6.598 square miles (17.09 km^{2}) is land and 0.595 square miles (1.54 km^{2}) (8.27%) is water.

There are several lakes in and just outside city limits, including Horseshoe Lake.

== Demographics ==
Historical population
Census	Pop.	Note	%±
1890	561		—
1960	1,026		—
1970	1,160		13.1%
1980	1,170		0.9%
1990	1,422		21.5%
2000	3,970		179.2%
2010	4,151		4.6%
2020	4,697		13.2%
2025 (est.)	6,978		48.6%
U.S. Decennial Census; 2020 Census

According to realtor website Zillow, the average price of a home as of September 30, 2026, in Black Diamond was $745,152.

As of the 2024 American Community Survey, there were 2,316 estimated households in Black Diamond with an average of 2.57 persons per household. The city has a median household income of $141,383. Approximately 2.1% of the city's population lives at or below the poverty line. Black Diamond has an estimated 73.1% employment rate, with 54.7% of the population holding a bachelor's degree or higher and 97.7% holding a high school diploma. There were 2,442 housing units at an average density of 370.11 per square mile (142.90/km^{2}).

The top five reported languages (people were allowed to report up to two languages, thus the figures will generally add to more than 100%) were English (82.0%), Spanish (3.8%), Indo-European (5.4%), Asian and Pacific Islander (8.8%), and Other (0.0%).

The median age in the city was 38.1 years.

Black Diamond, Washington – racial and ethnic composition Note: the US Census treats Hispanic/Latino as an ethnic category. This table excludes Latinos from the racial categories and assigns them to a separate category. Hispanics/Latinos may be of any race.
Race / ethnicity (NH = non-Hispanic)	Pop. 1980	Pop. 1990	Pop. 2000	Pop. 2010	Pop. 2020
White alone (NH)	1,125 (96.15%)	1,370 (96.34%)	3,650 (91.94%)	3,700 (89.14%)	3,655 (77.82%)
Black or African American alone (NH)	3 (0.26%)	2 (0.14%)	3 (0.08%)	47 (1.13%)	34 (0.72%)
Native American or Alaska Native alone (NH)	—	22 (1.55%)	57 (1.44%)	29 (0.70%)	26 (0.55%)
Asian alone (NH)	—	10 (0.70%)	40 (1.01%)	50 (1.20%)	129 (2.75%)
Pacific Islander alone (NH)	—	—	1 (0.03%)	12 (0.29%)	15 (0.32%)
Other race alone (NH)	28 (2.39%)	0 (0.00%)	10 (0.25%)	4 (0.10%)	27 (0.57%)
Multiracial (NH)	—	—	102 (2.57%)	116 (2.79%)	314 (6.69%)
Hispanic or Latino (any race)	14 (1.20%)	18 (1.27%)	107 (2.70%)	193 (4.65%)	497 (10.58%)
Total	1,170 (100.00%)	1,422 (100.00%)	3,970 (100.00%)	4,151 (100.00%)	4,697 (100.00%)

=== 2020 census ===
As of the 2020 census, there were 4,697 people, 1,729 households, and 1,345 families residing in the city. The population density was 717.10 inhabitants per square mile (276.87/km^{2}). There were 1,841 housing units at an average density of 281.07 per square mile (108.52/km^{2}). The racial makeup of the city was 79.39% White, 0.75% African American, 0.83% Native American, 2.83% Asian, 0.36% Pacific Islander, 5.94% from some other races and 9.90% from two or more races. Hispanic or Latino people of any race were 10.58% of the population.

=== 2010 census ===
As of the 2010 census, there were 4,151 people, 1,546 households, and 1,157 families residing in the city. The population density was 690.11 inhabitants per square mile (266.45/km^{2}). There were 1,685 housing units at an average density of 280.13 per square mile (108.16/km^{2}). The racial makeup of the city was 91.95% White, 1.16% African American, 0.75% Native American, 1.20% Asian, 0.29% Pacific Islander, 1.30% from some other races and 3.35% from two or more races. Hispanic or Latino people of any race were 4.65% of the population.

There were 1,546 households, of which 37.5% had children under the age of 18 living with them, 62.0% were married couples living together, 8.6% had a female householder with no husband present, 4.3% had a male householder with no wife present, and 25.2% were non-families. 17.9% of all households were made up of individuals, and 6.1% had someone living alone who was 65 years of age or older. The average household size was 2.68 and the average family size was 3.05.

The median age in the city was 40.4 years. 25.2% of residents were under the age of 18; 7% were between the ages of 18 and 24; 25.7% were from 25 to 44; 32.1% were from 45 to 64; and 10% were 65 years of age or older. The gender makeup of the city was 49.8% male and 50.2% female.

=== 2000 census ===
As of the 2000 census, there were 3,970 people, 1,456 households, and 1,131 families residing in the city. The population density was 739.53 inhabitants per square mile (285.53/km^{2}). There were 1,538 housing units at an average density of 286.50 per square mile (110.62/km^{2}). The racial makeup of the city was 93.43% White, 0.08% African American, 1.56% Native American, 1.01% Asian, 0.05% Pacific Islander, 0.88% from some other races and 3.00% from two or more races. Hispanic or Latino people of any race were 2.70% of the population.

The top four reported ancestries were 16.8% were of German, 13.2% Irish, 8.5% English and 7.4% Norwegian.

There were 1,456 households, out of which 41.2% had children under the age of 18 living with them, 65.2% were married couples living together, 8.3% had a female householder with no husband present, and 22.3% were non-families. 17.2% of all households were made up of individuals, and 6.0% had someone living alone who was 65 years of age or older. The average household size was 2.73 and the average family size was 3.08.

In the city the population was spread out, with 28.5% under the age of 18, 6.2% from 18 to 24, 34.1% from 25 to 44, 22.9% from 45 to 64, and 8.3% who were 65 years of age or older. The median age was 36 years. For every 100 females, there were 103.6 males. For every 100 females age 18 and over, there were 101.6 males.

The median income for a household in the city was $67,092, and the median income for a family was $72,981. Males had a median income of $51,792 versus $31,932 for females. The per capita income for the city was $26,936. About 0.8% of families and 0.9% of the population were below the poverty line, including 0.9% of those under age 18 and none of those age 65 or over.

== City landmarks ==
The City of Black Diamond has designated the following landmarks:

Landmark	Built	Listed	Address	Photo
Black Diamond Depot	1886	2020	32627 Railroad Avenue	
Black Diamond Cemetery	c. 1880	2000	Cemetery Hill Road	
Black Diamond Miners' Cabin	c. 1882	1995	24311 Morgan Street	
Luigi & Aurora Pagani House	c. 1896	2001	32901 Merino Street	

== Government and politics ==
Presidential Elections Results
Year	Republican	Democratic	Third Parties
2020	50.54% 1,635	46.52% 1,505	2.94% 95

Black Diamond remains one of the few right-leaning or Republican areas in King County. While Donald Trump carried the city twice, he did so both times by small margins.

== Notable people ==
The town was home to folk musician Brandi Carlile. The minor-league baseball star Edo Vanni was born at Black Diamond in 1918.
