= Funston, Georgia =

- Town
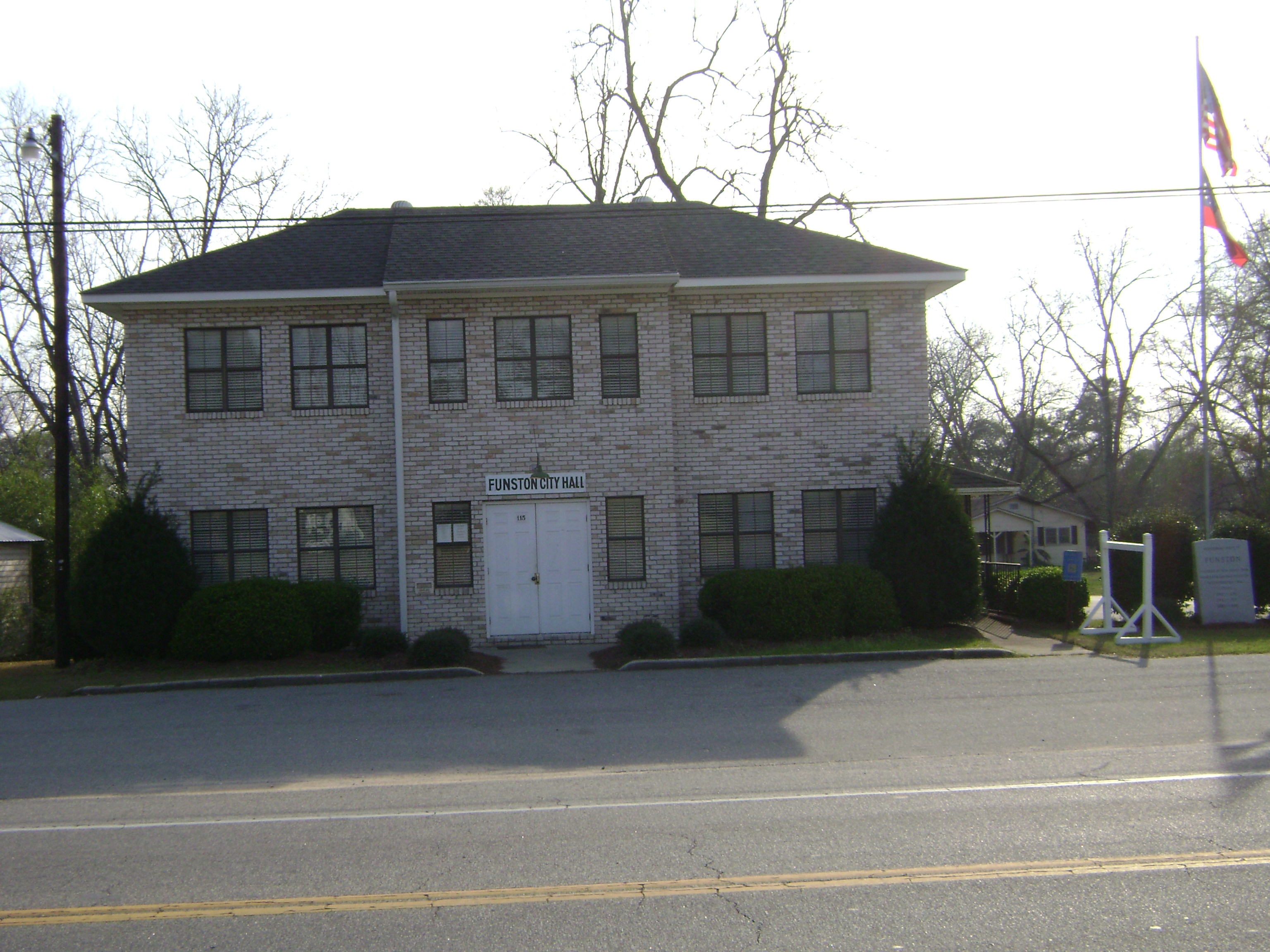
- Funston City Hall

- Location in Colquitt County and the state of Georgia
- Coordinates: 31°11′55″N 83°52′23″W
- Country: United States
- State: Georgia
- County: Colquitt

Area
  - Total: 1.17 sq mi (3.02 km^{2})
  - Land: 1.14 sq mi (2.96 km^{2})
  - Water: 0.023 sq mi (0.06 km^{2})
- Elevation: 351 ft (107 m)

Population (2020)
  - Total: 402
  - Density: 352.0/sq mi (135.89/km^{2})
- Time zone: UTC-5 (Eastern (EST))
  - Summer (DST): UTC-4 (EDT)
- ZIP code: 31753
- Area code: 229
- FIPS code: 13-31684
- GNIS feature ID: 0314461

Funston is a town in Colquitt County, Georgia, United States. The population was 402 in 2020.

== History ==
The Georgia General Assembly incorporated Funston in 1970.

== Geography ==
Funston is located at 31°11′55″N 83°52′23″W (31.198593, -83.873051). According to the United States Census Bureau, the town has a total area of 1.2 square miles (3.1 km^{2}), all land.

The climate in this area is characterized by relatively high temperatures and evenly distributed precipitation throughout the year. According to the Köppen Climate Classification system, Funston has a humid subtropical climate, abbreviated "Cfa" on climate maps.

Climate data for Funston, Georgia
| Month | Jan | Feb | Mar | Apr | May | Jun | Jul | Aug | Sep | Oct | Nov | Dec | Year |
|---|---|---|---|---|---|---|---|---|---|---|---|---|---|
| Mean daily maximum °C (°F) | 17 (63) | 19 (66) | 23 (73) | 27 (80) | 30 (86) | 33 (91) | 33 (92) | 33 (91) | 31 (88) | 27 (80) | 22 (71) | 18 (64) | 26 (79) |
| Mean daily minimum °C (°F) | 4 (40) | 6 (43) | 9 (48) | 12 (54) | 17 (62) | 20 (68) | 22 (71) | 21 (70) | 19 (66) | 13 (56) | 8 (47) | 5 (41) | 13 (56) |
| Average precipitation mm (inches) | 110 (4.3) | 110 (4.2) | 130 (5.2) | 97 (3.8) | 84 (3.3) | 130 (5) | 150 (5.9) | 130 (5.3) | 100 (4.1) | 61 (2.4) | 66 (2.6) | 94 (3.7) | 1,260 (49.7) |
Source: Weatherbase

== Demographics ==
Historical population
| Census | Pop. | Note | %± |
|---|---|---|---|
| 1910 | 236 | | — |
| 1920 | 157 | | −33.5% |
| 1930 | 144 | | −8.3% |
| 1940 | 199 | | 38.2% |
| 1950 | 233 | | 17.1% |
| 1960 | 293 | | 25.8% |
| 1970 | 293 | | 0.0% |
| 1980 | 337 | | 15.0% |
| 1990 | 248 | | −26.4% |
| 2000 | 426 | | 71.8% |
| 2010 | 449 | | 5.4% |
| 2020 | 402 | | −10.5% |
U.S. Decennial Census; 1850-1870 1870-1880; 1890-1910 1920-1930; 1940 1950 1960; 1970 1980 1990; 2000 2010

As of the census of 2000, there were 426 people, 155 households, and 121 families residing in the town. By 2020, its population was 402.
