= Barbers, Georgia =

Unincorporated community in Georgia, U.S.

Coordinates: 31°13′19″N 83°43′17″W

Barbers is an unincorporated community in Colquitt County, in the U.S. state of Georgia.

== History ==
A variant name was "Barber". The community was named after William H. Barber, a local businessman. A post office called Barber was established in 1901, and remained in operation until 1907. Besides the post office, the community had a railroad depot.
