= Lake Sawyer =

Lake in Washington, United States

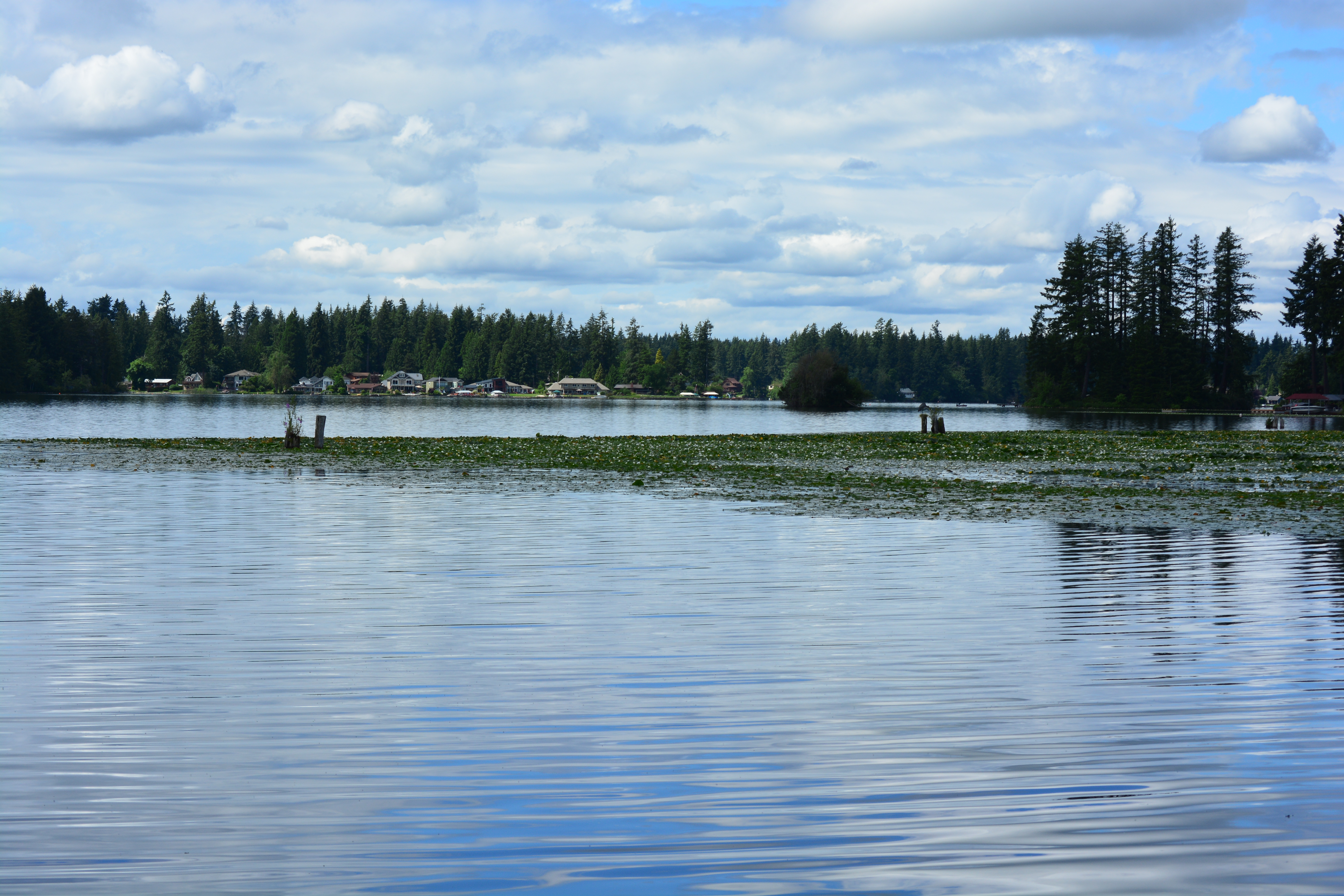
- View from Lake Sawyer Regional Park

- Location within Washington (state) Location within the United States
- Location: Black Diamond, Washington, United States
- Coordinates: 47°20′0″N 122°2′15″W
- Part of: Green River watershed
- Primary inflows: Beaver Creek, Rock Creek
- Primary outflows: Covington Creek
- Catchment area: 8,320 acres (33.7 km^{2})
- Basin countries: United States
- Surface area: 310 acres (1.3 km^{2})
- Average depth: 25 feet (7.6 m)
- Max. depth: 58 feet (18 m)
- Residence time: 19 weeks
- Surface elevation: 495 feet (151 m)

Lake Sawyer is a freshwater lake in Black Diamond, Washington. Only three other natural lakes in King County have a larger surface area. Lake Sawyer consists of three islands as well.

Lake Sawyer is underlain by glacial outwash and till dating from the Vashon Glaciation, as well as older glaciations that occurred during the Pleistocene. The bedrock underlying this mass of sediments is classified as the Hammer Bluff Formation, which was deposited during the Miocene epoch and consists of sedimentary rocks with some volcanic deposits. Discharge from the lake via groundwater outflow is thought to occur mostly in the northeast and southwest corners. Lake Sawyer is classified as mesotrophic, with algal growth limited by phosphorus availability. A 1994 survey found 23 species of plants growing in the lake and along its shorelines, including the invasive Myriophyllum spicatum and Nymphaea odorata.

A concrete dam was built at the outlet in 1952 to regulate the lake level. Several species of fish, some of which are stocked, can be caught in the lake.

== Bibliography ==
- Hart Crowser, Inc. (October 5, 1990). Lake Sawyer Hydrogeologic Study – Black Diamond, Washington (PDF) (Report). Washington State Department of Ecology.
- Lake Sawyer Management Plan (PDF) (Report). King County Department of Natural Resources and Parks, Water and Land Resources Division. July 2000.
- Pelletier, G. J.; Joy, J. W. (September 1989). Lake Sawyer – Black Diamond Waste Load Allocation Evaluation (PDF) (Report). Washington State Department of Ecology.
