= Horseshoe Lake (Chisago County, Minnesota) =

Lake in the state of Minnesota, United States

- Location within Minnesota
- Location: Chisago County, Minnesota
- Coordinates: 45°35′31″N 93°3′13″W
- Type: lake

Horseshoe Lake is a lake in Chisago County, Minnesota, in the United States.

Horseshoe Lake was named from the resemblance of its outline to a horseshoe.

== See also ==
- List of lakes in Minnesota
