= Klinkhammer Lakes =

Group of lakes in Douglas County, Washington, United States

- Murphy Lake
- Location within Washington (state) Location within the United States
- Location: Douglas County, Washington
- Coordinates: 48°00′15″N 119°27′34″W
- Basin countries: United States
- Surface elevation: 2,100 ft (640 m)

Klinkhammer Lakes (also, Murphy Lake) is a lake in Douglas County, Washington, located 2.3 miles (3.7 km) West of Nilles Corner, WA. The Klinkhammer Lakes lie at an elevation of 2,100 feet (640 m). The largest lake measures 2,100 by 1,050 ft (640 by 320 m).
