= Murphy Lake (Lincoln County, Montana) =

Lake in Lincoln County, Montana, United States

- Location within Montana Location within the United States
- Location: Lincoln County, Montana
- Coordinates: 48°44′05″N 114°51′33″W
- Primary inflows: Dickey Creek, Murphy Creek, Laughing Water Creek
- Primary outflows: Dickey Creek
- Basin countries: United States
- Surface area: 141 acres (57 ha)
- Surface elevation: 2,999 ft (914 m)

Murphy Lake is a lake in Lincoln County, Montana, United States, within Kootenai National Forest, northwest of Dickey Lake. Murphy Lake lies at an elevation of 2999 feet (914 m). A ranger station and a campground are located on the lake's shore.
