= Horseshoe Lake (Douglas County, Minnesota) =

Lake in the state of Minnesota, United States

- Location within Minnesota
- Location: Douglas County, Minnesota
- Coordinates: 46°1′41″N 95°41′21″W
- Type: lake

Horseshoe Lake is a lake in Douglas County, Minnesota, in the United States. It was named from the resemblance of its outline to a horseshoe.

== See also ==
- List of lakes in Minnesota
