= Dickey Lake =

Lake in Montana

- Interactive map of Dickey Lake
- Location: Montana, United States
- Coordinates: 48°42′41.19″N 114°49′0.11″W
- Type: Lake
- Primary inflows: Summit Creek
- Surface area: 604 acres (244 ha)
- Average depth: 59 feet (18 m)
- Max. depth: 74 feet (23 m)
- Residence time: UTC -7 (Mountain Time Zone) UTC -6 (DST)
- Surface elevation: 3,114 feet (949 m)
- References: GNIS 782372

Dickey Lake is a lake in Montana, United States.

== See also ==
- List of lakes in Montana
- List of lakes in Lincoln County, Montana
