= Horseshoe Lake (Shasta County, California) =

Lake in the state of California, United States

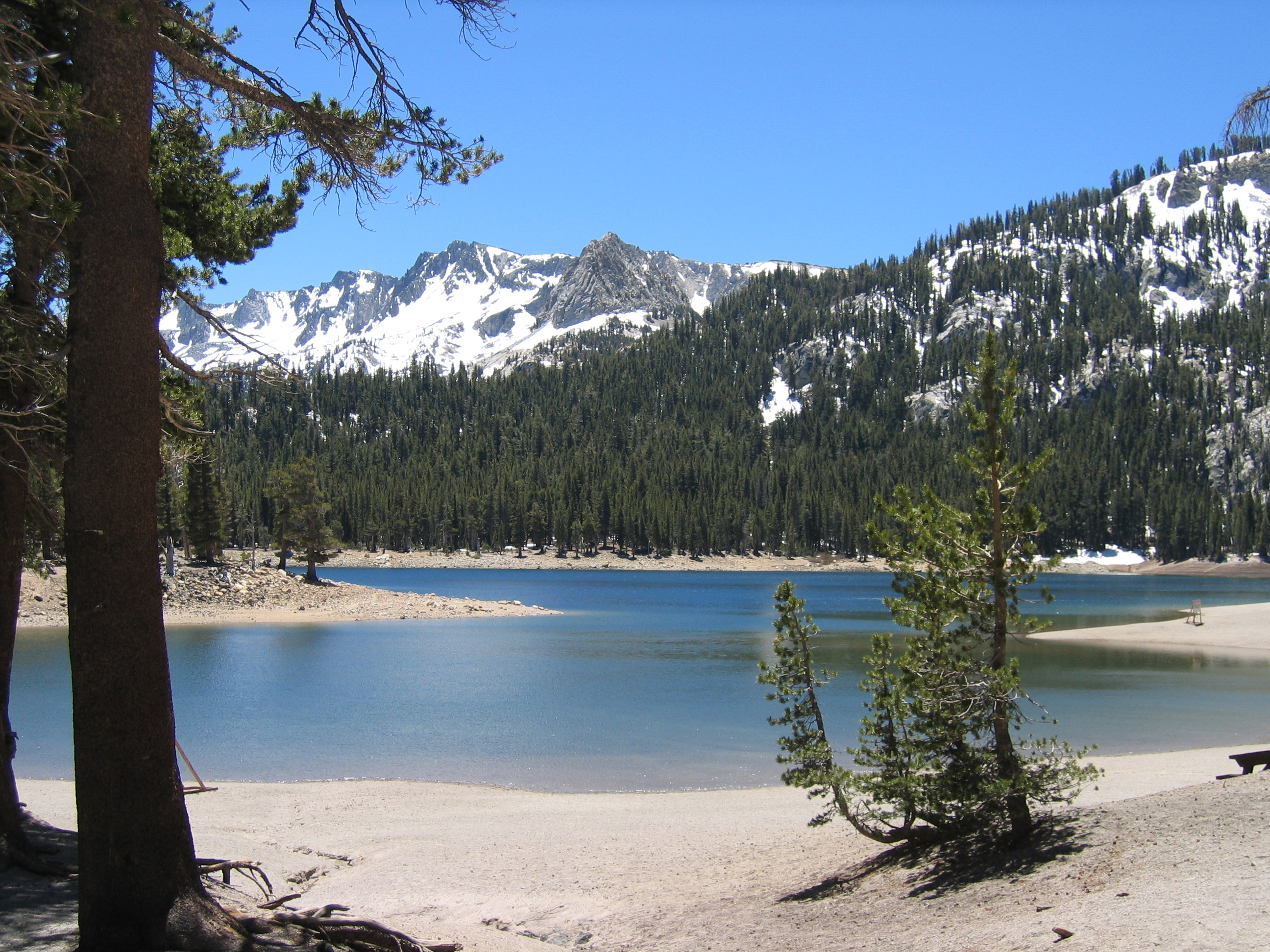

- Location within California Location within the United States
- Location: Lassen Volcanic National Park, Shasta County, California, US
- Coordinates: 40°28′21″N 121°20′09″W
- Basin countries: United States
- Surface elevation: 6,550 ft (1,996 m)

Horseshoe Lake is a lake located in the eastern part of Lassen Volcanic National Park near Juniper Lake, in Shasta County, California. The lake lies at an elevation of 6,550 ft (1,996 m). Water from Horseshoe Lake drains to Snag Lake via Grassy Creek. The lake is accessible by hiking trail only.

== See also ==
- List of lakes in California
