= Murphy Lake (Louisiana) =

Lake in Louisiana, United States

- Location within Louisiana Location within the United States
- Location: Atchafalaya Basin, Louisiana
- Coordinates: 30°06′16″N 91°23′16″W
- Basin countries: United States
- Surface elevation: 3 ft (0.91 m)

Murphy Lake is a lake in Iberville and Upper St. Martin Parishes, Louisiana, United States, within the Atchafalaya Basin. Murphy Lake lies at an elevation of 3 feet (1 m). It's 2 miles southeast of Natchitoches.
