= Horseshoe Lake (Isanti County, Minnesota) =

Lake in the state of Minnesota, United States

- Location within Minnesota
- Location: Isanti County, Minnesota
- Coordinates: 45°27′33″N 93°3′0″W
- Type: lake

Horseshoe Lake is a lake in Isanti County, in the U.S. state of Minnesota.

Horseshoe Lake was so named on account of its outline being in the shape of a horseshoe.

== See also ==
- List of lakes in Minnesota
