= Black Diamond Cemetery =

Historic place in King County, Washington, US

- U.S. National Register of Historic Places
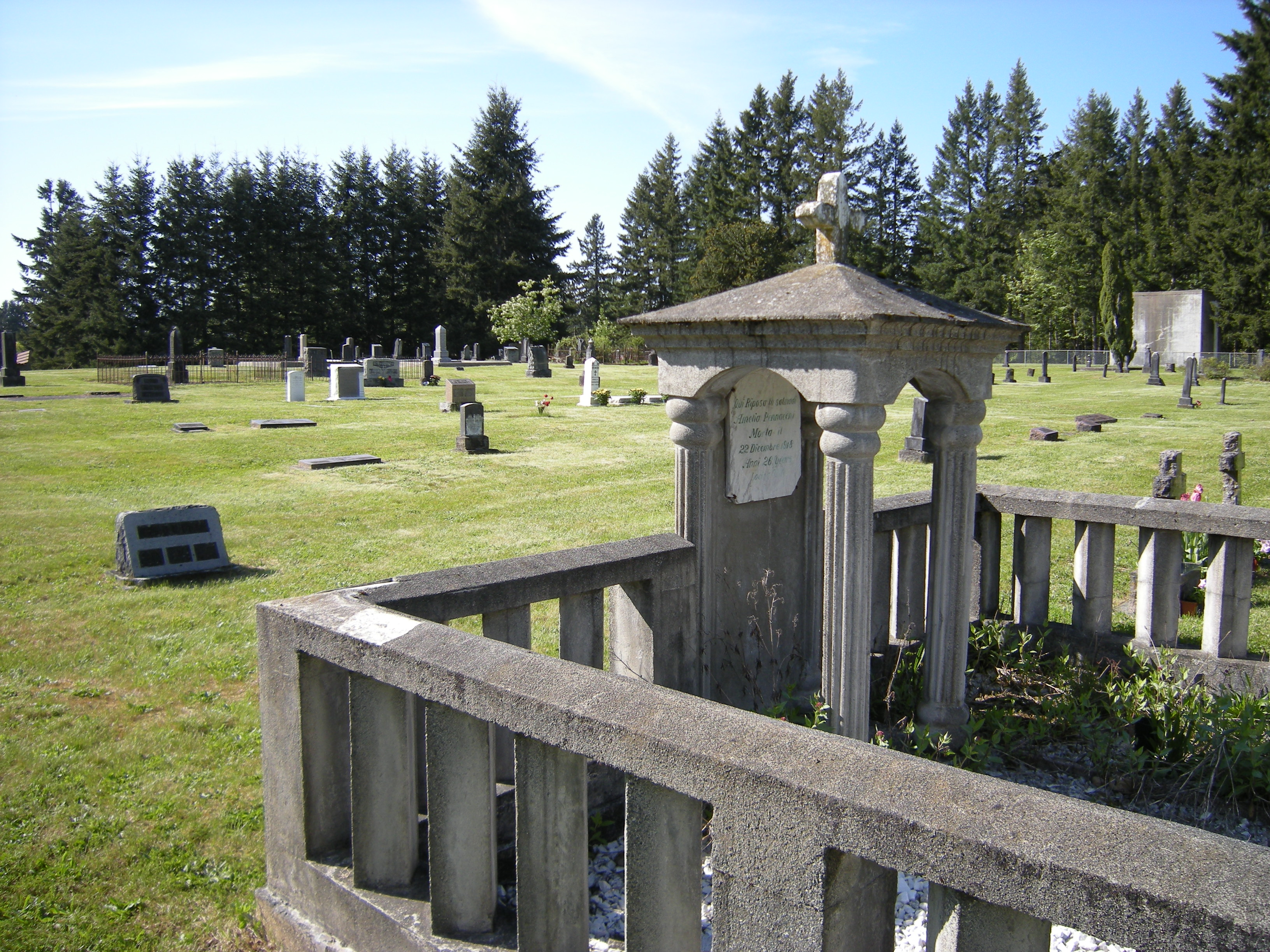
- Black Diamond Cemetery

- Location within Washington (state) Location within the United States
- Location: Cemetery Hill Rd., Black Diamond, Washington
- Coordinates: 47°18′39″N 122°0′55″W
- Area: 3.5 acres (1.4 ha)
- Built: 1886
- NRHP reference No.: 00000406
- Added to NRHP: April 21, 2000

Black Diamond Cemetery is a cemetery located in Black Diamond, Washington listed on the National Register of Historic Places.

== Description and history ==
Established in 1884 by the Black Diamond Coal Mining Company as both a company and community cemetery, it was originally enclosed by a wooden picket fence with a double-gate hearse entrance and a stile for pedestrians. The fence has since been replaced by a chain-link fence.

The cemetery contains more than 1200 graves, many of immigrants who came to the area as miners. One grave contains the remains of eight miners, killed in the Lawson Mine explosion in November, 1910. The earliest gravemarker following establishment of the townsite is a tall marble marker, near the west side of the central road and gate, dated March 25, 1886.

Funds to manage the cemetery were initially obtained by deducting a "cemetery fee" from miners' paychecks. Since 1977, the City of Black Diamond has been responsible for the maintenance and operation of the cemetery.

== See also ==
- National Register of Historic Places listings in King County, Washington
