= Alvord Lake (Arizona) =

Lake in Laveen, Arizona, US

- Location within Arizona Location within the United States
- Location: Phoenix, Arizona
- Coordinates: 33°22′39.8″N 112°8′13.2″W
- Basin countries: United States
- Surface area: 24 acres (9.7 ha)
- Average depth: 14 ft (4.3 m)
- Surface elevation: 1,100 ft (340 m)
- Settlements: Phoenix

Alvord Lake is an urban fishing lake located in Cesar Chavez Park in Laveen, Arizona, at the southwest corner of 35th Avenue and Baseline Road.

Alvord Lake was part of a parcel of land willed to the city of Phoenix, Arizona by Gilbert Alvord. Alvord was the sole heir to the Edgar Apperson fortune. They made their home together in Phoenix, Arizona.

== Fish species ==
- Urban fishing license is no longer needed, as long as you have a general fishing license, you can fish in any of the 36 "community fishing lakes"
- Largemouth bass
- Sunfish
- Catfish (channel)
- Rainbow Trout stocked by AZGFD. See Stocking Schedule
