= Horseshoe Lake (Todd County, Minnesota) =

Lake in the state of Minnesota, United States

- Location within Minnesota
- Location: Todd County, Minnesota
- Coordinates: 46°7′9″N 94°49′49″W
- Type: lake

Horseshoe Lake is a lake in Todd County, in the U.S. state of Minnesota.

Horseshoe Lake was so named on account of its outline being shaped like a horseshoe.

== See also ==
- List of lakes in Minnesota
