= Horseshoe Lake (King County, Washington) =

Lake in King County, Washington

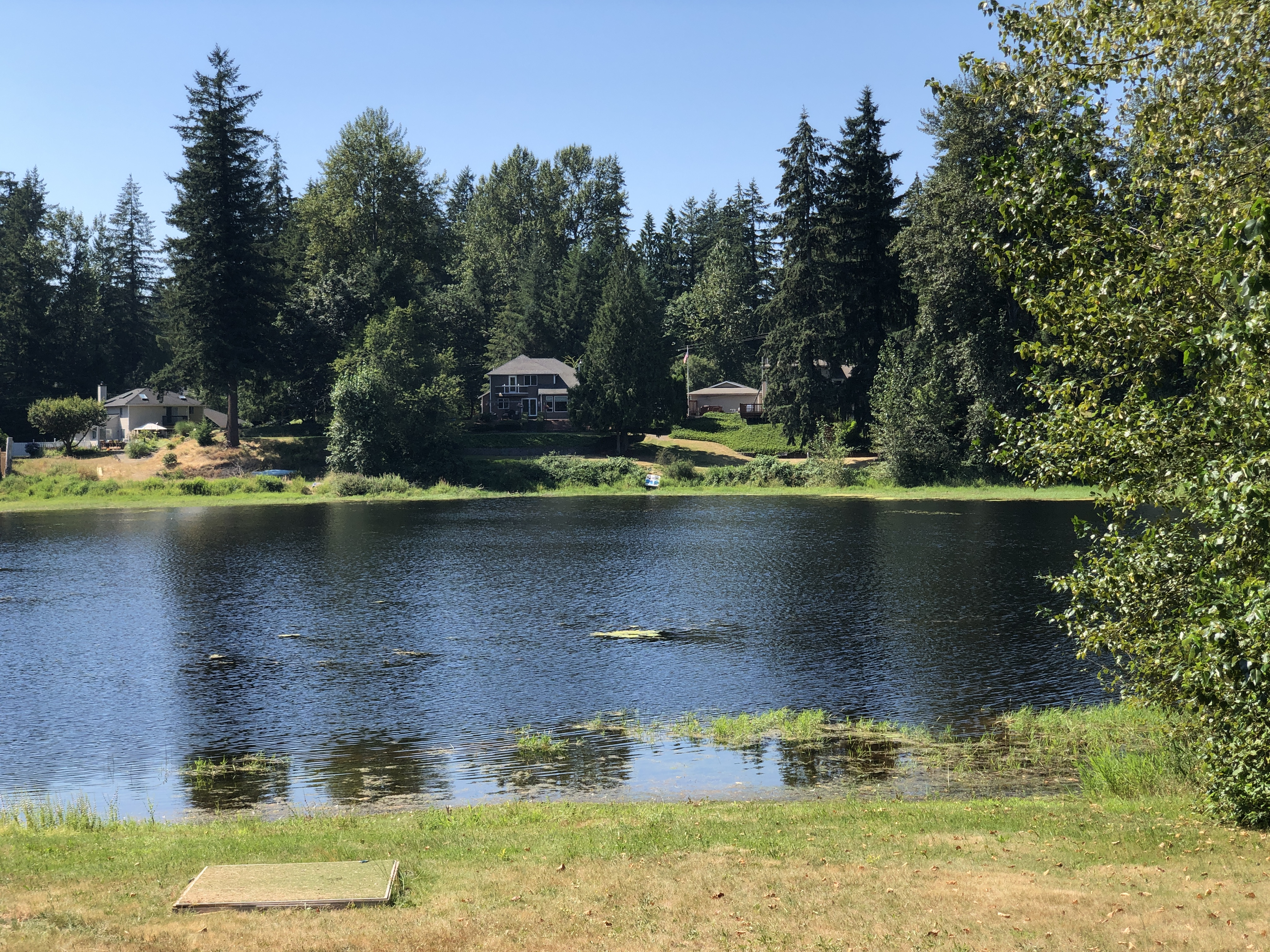
- View of Horseshoe Lake

- Location within Washington (state) Location within the United States
- Location: King County, Washington
- Coordinates: 47.3091213°N 122.0413821°W
- Basin countries: United States
- Surface elevation: 499 ft (152 m)

Horseshoe Lake is a small lake in unincorporated King County, Washington, near the city of Black Diamond. Due its location and hydrology, it frequently floods.

== Description ==
Horseshoe Lake is very shallow, and has unstable thermal stratification. The lake was monitored for water quality in 2000 and from 2002 to 2008, and measurements indicated that it is a eutrophic lake.

The lake has no natural outflows, and no significant inflows. The lake is a closed depression, fed and drained by groundwater. Due to this, it experiences rapid, drastic fluctuations in water level that have frequently threatened nearby homes. King County has routinely pumped water out of the lake since the 1990s to reduce flood risk.
