= Horseshoe Lake (Mono County, California) =

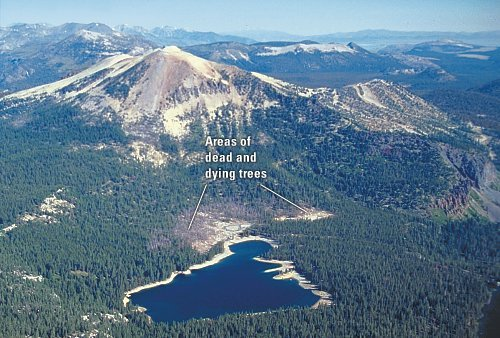
- Aerial image of Horseshoe Lake, showing areas with high carbon dioxide concentrations

- Location within California Location within the United States
- Location: Mono County, California
- Coordinates: 37°37′N 119°01′W
- Type: lake

Horseshoe Lake is a lake in Mono County, California, near the Mammoth Mountain ski resort. The soil near the lake contains a high concentration of carbon dioxide which, when it seeps from the soil, kills trees and poses a threat to humans.
