= Gray Lake =

- Location of Gray Lake within New York
- Location: Herkimer County, New York
- Coordinates: 43°42′08″N 74°57′48″W
- Type: Lake
- Basin countries: United States
- Surface area: 48 acres (19 ha)
- Surface elevation: 1,762 ft (537 m)
- Settlements: Old Forge

Gray Lake is a small lake southeast of Old Forge in Herkimer County, New York. It drains north via an unnamed creek which flows into First Lake.

== See also ==
- List of lakes in New York
