= Horseshoe Lake (Kitsap County) =

Lake in Kitsap County, Washington, U.S.

Coordinates: 47°24′29″N 122°39′53″W

Horseshoe Lake is a small lake in Burley, Washington, a census-designated place roughly 10 miles (16 km) south of the city of Port Orchard in Kitsap County. Named for its horseshoe shape, the lake covers just over 40 acres (16 ha) and has an average depth of 12 feet (3.7 m). The lake has no outlet, but is fed by surrounding wetlands north of the lake. The lake is less than a mile from the Pierce County border. Less than fifty properties surround the lake on Sidney Road SW to the west, SW Lake Street, and Horseshoe Avenue SW, both to the east. The nearby Horseshoe Lake Golf Course is named for the lake.

Horseshoe Lake County Park is located at the southwest corner of the lake, and has walking trails, restrooms, a playground, a boardwalk, and a ball field. The park is among the top five swimming destinations in Kitsap County according to the Kitsap Public Health District, and like all county lake swimming beaches, Horseshoe Lake has free life jacket loaning stations for children.

There are several fish species at the lake, including bluegill, largemouth bass, pumpkinseed sunfish, and rainbow trout.

The lake has a history of blue-green algae blooms and elevated E. coli bacteria levels, and is occasionally closed to swimmers and fishermen, especially during summer months. The Kitsap Public Health District attributes high bacteria levels to high use of the park and a lack of an outlet to circulate water.

In 1960, 70 acres (28 ha) of land that include the southeast corner of Horseshoe Lake were purchased by Crista Camps, an organization that operates a Christian summer camp and ranch that serves 12,000 campers a year.

In 2021, a 20 acres (8.1 ha) brush fire near the lake prompted a response from five local fire agencies and the Washington Department of Natural Resources. One person received minor injuries, but no damage to structures were reported from the fire, which burned for several days.
