= Snowdrift Lake =

Lake in Grand County, Colorado, United States

- Murphy Lakes
- Location within Colorado Location within the United States
- Location: Rocky Mountain National Park, Grand County, Colorado, US
- Coordinates: 40°18′25″N 105°44′05″W
- Basin countries: United States
- Surface elevation: 11,069 ft (3,374 m)

Snowdrift Lake (also, Murphy Lakes) is a lake in Grand County, Colorado, United States. It is part of Rocky Mountain National Park. Snowdrift Lake lies at an elevation of 11069 feet (3374 m), below Snowdrift Peak.
