= Murphy Lakes (Washington) =

Group of lakes in King County, Washington, US

- Location within Washington (state) Location within the United States
- Location: King County, Washington
- Coordinates: 47°41′02″N 121°07′50″W
- Basin countries: United States
- Surface elevation: 4,741 ft (1,445 m)

Murphy Lakes are two lakes in King County, Washington, United States. Murphy Lakes lie at an elevation of 4741 feet (1445 m).
