= Lake Murphy (Washington) =

- Location within Washington (state)
- Location: King County, Washington
- Coordinates: 47°41′02″N 121°07′47″W
- Type: lake
- Basin countries: United States
- Surface elevation: 4,751 ft (1,448 m)

Lake Murphy is a lake in King County, Washington. Klinkhammer Lakes lie at an elevation of 4,751 feet (1,448 m).
