= Murphy Lake (Itasca County, Minnesota) =

Lake in the state of Minnesota, United States

- Location within Minnesota Location within the United States
- Location: Itasca County, Minnesota
- Coordinates: 47°26′28″N 93°28′24″W
- Basin countries: United States
- Surface area: 119 acres (48 ha)
- Surface elevation: 1,332 ft (406 m)

Murphy Lake (also, Horseshoe Lake) is a lake in Itasca County, Minnesota, United States. Murphy Lake lies at an elevation of 1332 feet (406 m). Maximum depth is about 15 feet (4.6 m). Murphy Lake is approximately 18 miles north of Grand Rapids.

Known fish spices in Murphy Lake include Northern Pike, Rock Bass, Perch, and (grey) Suckers. Wild rice does not grow in Murphy Lake.

In addition to numerous springs, water flows into Murphy Lake from the northeast from Arrowhead Lake. Water flows out of Murphy Lake via a creek on the south side and flows into the Hanson Lake chain of lakes.

A public access on the west side of Murphy Lake is accessible from the Murphy Lake Road which perpendicularly adjoins Itasca County Road 49 (Spider Lake Road). Another access road on the east side of Murphy Lake also serves access to the south side of Arrowhead Lake. The only privately owned parcel is on the north side of the lake.
