= Alvord Lake (Montana) =

- Location within Montana Location within the United States
- Location: Lincoln County, Montana, United States
- Coordinates: 48°29′43″N 115°53′09″W
- Type: Lake
- Basin countries: United States
- Surface elevation: 2,582 ft (787 m)

Alvord Lake is a lake in Lincoln County of the U.S. state of Montana. Its elevation is 2,582 feet (787 m).
