= Tin Can Mike Lake =

Lake in the state of Minnesota, United States

- Mike Lake; Murphy Lake
- Location within Minnesota Location within the United States
- Location: Fall Lake Township, Lake County, Minnesota
- Coordinates: 48°03′12″N 91°46′10″W
- Basin countries: United States
- Surface elevation: 1,306 ft (398 m)

Tin Can Mike Lake (also, Mike Lake and Murphy Lake) is a lake in Lake County, Minnesota. Tin Can Mike Lake lies at an elevation of 1306 feet (398 m).
