= Lake Murphy (Florida) =

Lake in the state of Florida, United States

- Location within Florida Location within the United States
- Location: Lake County, Florida
- Coordinates: 28°55′22″N 81°35′49″W
- Basin countries: United States
- Surface area: 60 acres (24 ha)
- Surface elevation: 62 ft (19 m)

Lake Murphy is a freshwater lake in Lake County, Florida, United States. Lake Murphy lies at an elevation of 62 feet (19 m).
