= Rollway Lake =

Lake in the state of Michigan, United States

- Murphey Lake, Murphy Lake, Stony Lake
- Location within Michigan Location within the United States
- Location: Newaygo County, Michigan
- Coordinates: 43°38′30″N 85°57′45″W
- Type: Lake
- Basin countries: United States
- Surface area: 39.8 acres (16.1 ha)
- Max. depth: 20 ft (6.1 m)
- Surface elevation: 794 ft (242 m)

Rollway Lake (also, Murphey Lake, Murphy Lake, and Stony Lake) is a lake located in Beaver Township and Denver Township in Newaygo County, Michigan.

== See also ==
- List of lakes in Michigan
