= Murphy Lakes (Wyoming) =

Group of lakes in the American state of Wyoming

- Location within Wyoming Location within the United States
- Location: Lincoln County, Wyoming
- Coordinates: 43°03′12″N 110°51′50″W
- Basin countries: United States
- Surface elevation: 6,762 ft (2,061 m)

Murphy Lakes is a group of lakes in Lincoln County, Wyoming, United States. Murphy Lakes lie at an elevation of 6762 feet (2061 m).
