= Lake Murphy (Oregon) =

- Location within Oregon Location within the United States
- Location: Lane County, Oregon
- Coordinates: 43°35′21.8″N 122°39′11.8″W
- Type: Lake
- Basin countries: United States
- Surface elevation: 5,174 ft (1,577 m)

Lake Murphy is a lake in Lane County, Oregon. Lake Murphy lies on the north slope of Fairview Peak, 14 miles (23 km) southwest of Oakridge, at an elevation of 5,174 ft (1,577 m).
