= Lake Murphy (Colquitt County, Georgia) =

Lake in Georgia, United States

Murphy Lake
- Location within Georgia Location within the United States
- Location: Colquitt County, Georgia
- Coordinates: 31.0806°N 83.8362°W
- Basin countries: United States
- Surface area: 25 acres (10 ha)

Murphy Lake is a lake at Moultrie in Colquitt County, Georgia, United States. Its surface area is 25 acres (10 ha).

It is a location for bass, channel catfish and bream fishing.
