= Murphy Lakes (Georgia) =

Lakes Murphy
- Location within Georgia Location within the United States
- Location: Catoosa County, Georgia
- Coordinates: 34°54′42″N 85°11′36″W
- Type: reservoir
- Basin countries: United States
- Surface elevation: 748 ft (228 m)

Murphy Lakes is a reservoir in Catoosa County, Georgia, United States. Murphy Lakes lie at an elevation of 748 feet (228 m).
