= Haynach Lakes =

- Interactive map of Haynach Lakes
- Location: Grand County, Colorado, United States
- Coordinates: 40°13′N 105°47′W
- Type: Lake
- Surface elevation: 11,069 ft (3,374 m)

Haynach Lakes (also, Murphy Lakes) is a lake in Grand County, Colorado. Haynach Lakes lie at an elevation of 11,069 feet (3,374 m).
