= Ashburn (surname) =

Ashburn is a surname. In England, men living near an important, named waterway might be named after it, as in the case of Ashburn originating from "ash tree brook". An alternative English origin states that Ashburn is a variant of Ashborn, which itself descended from several surnames in use during the 14th and 15th centuries.

Notable people who share this surname include:

- Cliff Ashburn (1905–1989), American football player
- George W. Ashburn (1814–1868), assassinated American politician
- Ida Nancy Ashburn (1909–1980), Australian headmistress and nurse
- Justin Ashburn (born 1981), American race car driver
- Kristen Ashburn (born 1973), American photojournalist
- Percy Moreau Ashburn (1872–1940), United States Army medical officer
- Richie Ashburn (1927–1997), American baseball player
- Roy Ashburn (born 1954), American politician
- Thomas Q. Ashburn (judge) (1820–1890), American judge
- Thomas Q. Ashburn (general) (1874–1941), United States Army officer

== Namesakes without articles ==
- Cecil Ashburn (1920–2012), American businessman after whom Cecil Ashburn Drive in Alabama was named
- George T. Ashburn (died 1868), American pioneer settler after whom Ashburn, Missouri was named
- W. W. Ashburn (1838–1906), American bank president after whom W. W. Ashburn House and Ashburn, Georgia were named

== See also ==
- Ashburn (disambiguation)
- Senator Ashburn (disambiguation)
- Betsy Ross aka Elizabeth Ashburn (1752–1836), person credited with making the U.S. flag
- Music of Dragon Age: Origins, music from the video game Dragon Age: Origins, for which Aubrey Ashburn who provided vocals for the music
- The Heat (film), 2013 American buddy cop action comedy film by Paul Feig, in which was the character Sarah Ashburn
- The Tavern Knight, a 1920 film, in which were characters Cynthia, Joseph and Gregory Ashburn
