= Ashbourne =

Ashbourne may refer to:

- Ashbourne, County Meath, Ireland, a town
  - Ashbourne RFC, a rugby union club
- Ashbourne, Derbyshire, England, a town
- Ashbourne, South Australia, a small town
- Ashbourne, Victoria, Australia, a locality
- Baron Ashbourne, a title in the peerage of the United Kingdom

== See also ==
- Ashbourne Cup, a camogie tournament in Ireland
- Ashbourne portrait, once thought to prove that Shakespeare was Edward de Vere, 17th Earl of Oxford
- Ashburn (disambiguation)
- Clive Ashborn, English actor
- Thomas of Ashborne (fl. 1382), English theological controversialist
