= Ashburn =

Ashburn may refer to:

== Places ==
=== Canada ===
- Ashburn, Ontario

=== United States ===
- Ashburn, Georgia
- Ashburn, Chicago, Illinois, a community area
  - Ashburn station (Illinois), a Metra station serving the area
- Ashburn, Missouri
- Ashburn, Virginia, a census-designated place in Loudoun County, part of the Washington metropolitan area.
  - Ashburn station (Washington Metro), a Washington Metro station serving the area

== People ==
- Ashburn (surname)

== See also ==
- Ashbourne (disambiguation)
