= Benjamin Poore =

Benjamin Poore may refer to:

- Benjamin Perley Poore (1820–1887), American newspaper correspondent, editor, and author
- Benjamin A. Poore (1863–1940), United States Army officer
