= Julius Penn =

United States Army general

Julius A. Penn
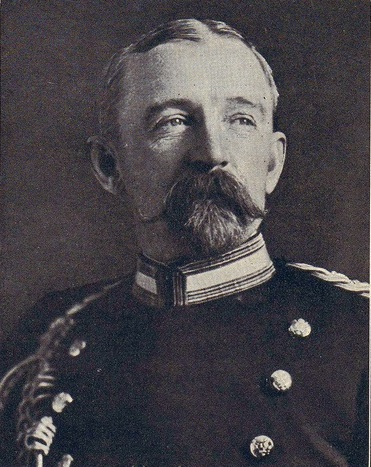
- Brigadier General Julius Penn, from the 1935 report of the Association of Graduates of the United States Military Academy.
- Born: February 19, 1865; Mattoon, Illinois
- Died: May 13, 1934 (aged 69); Batavia, Ohio
- Burial place: Batavia Union Cemetery, Batavia, Ohio
- Relatives: Thomas Q. Ashburn (Cousin); Percy Moreau Ashburn (Cousin)
- Military career
- Allegiance: United States
- Branch: United States Army
- Service years: 1886–1924
- Rank: Brigadier General
- Nickname: Pennie
- Service number: 0-184
- Unit: United States Army Infantry Branch
- Commands: 2nd Battalion, 34th U.S. Volunteer Infantry Regiment; Provisional Battalion, 7th Infantry Regiment; Provisional Battalion, 12th Infantry Regiment; 3rd Infantry Regiment; 37th Infantry Regiment; 170th Infantry Brigade, 85th Division; Personnel Bureau, American Expeditionary Forces Headquarters; 76th Infantry Brigade, 38th Division; Camp Zachary Taylor, Kentucky; U.S. Disciplinary Barracks, Governors Island, New York
- Conflicts: American Indian Wars; Spanish–American War; Philippine–American War; Pancho Villa Expedition; World War I
- Awards: Silver Star

Julius A. Penn (February 19, 1865 – May 13, 1934) was a career officer in the United States Army. He attained the rank of brigadier general during World War I, and commanded 170th Infantry Brigade, 85th Division and 76th Infantry Brigade, 38th Division, in addition to serving as Chief of the Personnel Bureau for the American Expeditionary Forces.

The son of a Union Army veteran of the American Civil War, Penn was born in Mattoon, Illinois, and raised in Batavia, Ohio. He graduated from the United States Military Academy in 1886, and was a classmate and close friend of John J. Pershing. After graduation, he served in the Western United States as a member of the 13th and 2nd Infantry Regiments, and he was an 1891 graduate of the Infantry and Cavalry School, the predecessor of the Command and General Staff College. During the Spanish–American War, Penn served as a quartermaster officer at Camp George H. Thomas, Georgia and the Tampa mobilization point before contracting typhoid. After recovering, he was assigned to the Philippines, where he commanded 2nd Battalion, 34th Infantry. Penn's post-war assignments included service with the 7th Infantry in the Philippines, aide to General Henry Clark Corbin, and commander of provisional battalions in the 7th and 12th Infantry Regiments. He was a 1907 graduate of the Army War College, and during the Pancho Villa Expedition, Penn commanded the 3rd Infantry Regiment in Texas.

Penn was promoted to brigadier general at the start of World War I, and he served successively as commander of 170th Infantry Brigade, 85th Division, Chief of the American Expeditionary Forces Personnel Bureau, and commander of 76th Infantry Brigade, 38th Division. He served on the staff of the Adjutant General of the Army following the war, then commanded the US Disciplinary Barracks at Governors Island, New York until retiring in 1924. In 1934, Penn was decorated with the Silver Star for heroism while assigned to the 34th Infantry in the Philippines.

A lifelong bachelor, in retirement, Penn resided with his sister in Batavia. He died in Batavia on May 13, 1934, and was buried at Batavia Union Cemetery.

== Early life ==
Julius Augustus Penn Jr. was born in Mattoon, Illinois, on February 19, 1865, the son of Julius A. Penn (1818-1882) and Mary (Brock) Penn. The senior Penn was an attorney who had known Ulysses S. Grant during Grant's youth in Ohio. At the start of the American Civil War, he recruited and organized Company D, 22nd Ohio Infantry, which he commanded as a captain. He was later promoted to major on the regimental staff, and served until the end of the war.

The younger Penn graduated from Batavia High School in 1881, the school's first graduating class. He then took a competitive examination for appointment to the United States Military Academy (West Point) by his district's Congressman, Henry Lee Morey. Penn finished first among 30 applicants, but was too young to begin classes, so the appointment went to the second-place finisher. The second-place finisher failed his midterm examination in January 1882 and Penn, who would be old enough for admission after he turned seventeen in February, successfully petitioned for the appointment.

== Start of career ==
Penn graduated from West Point in 1886, ranked 69th of 77, and was commissioned as a second lieutenant in the 13th Infantry. Penn formed a lifelong friendship with classmate John J. Pershing, and after fellow Army officer Richard B. Paddock married Pershing's sister Grace, Pershing, Paddock and Penn socialized extensively while assigned to Fort Stanton, New Mexico. They hired a cook to grow vegetables and prepare meals for all three, and went on extensive hunting and fishing trips, which led to them being dubbed “The Three Green Ps”.

While in New Mexico, Penn participated in an 1886 expedition against members of the Jicarilla Apache band, who were resisting attempts to be settled on a reservation. In 1887, he was involved in an expedition against members of the Mescalero tribe who had left their reservation.

During the early years of his career, Penn served throughout the Western United States, including postings to Oklahoma, Wyoming and Idaho. He graduated from the Infantry and Cavalry School at Fort Leavenworth in 1891 (now the Command and General Staff College), and his thesis on mounted infantry was published in the Journal of the Military Service Institution of the United States. After graduation, he was assigned to the 2nd Infantry and in addition to his regular duties he was assigned to Omaha High School as an instructor in military tactics for the school's corps of cadets. In 1894, he was in Butte, Montana, as part of the Army's response to labor unrest during the Pullman Strike. In 1895, he took part in an expedition against the Bannock Indians, which was organized after false reports of an imminent uprising at the Bannock reservation in Wyoming.

== Spanish–American War ==
Penn was the 2nd Infantry's quartermaster from 1896 to 1897, and adjutant from 1897 to 1898. During the summer of 1898, he performed quartermaster duties for soldiers mustering and training at Camp George H. Thomas, Georgia and departing by ship from Tampa, Florida, for service in Cuba, including: Hamilton S. Hawkins’s Provisional Brigade; 1st Division, Seventh Corps; 1st Brigade, Provisional Division, Fifth Corps; 3rd Division, Fourth Corps; and quartermaster in charge of ship transport at the Port of Tampa.

Penn became ill with typhoid in September and was granted several weeks of leave to recover. From October 1898 to July 1899, he served on the West Point faculty as an assistant instructor of tactics.

== Philippine–American War ==
In July 1899, Penn was promoted to temporary major and assigned to the newly-organized 34th U.S. Volunteer Infantry Regiment. Selected to command the regiment's 2nd Battalion, he was posted to Fort Logan and spent the summer recruiting soldiers from Colorado, New Mexico, and Arizona.

Penn's regiment arrived in the Philippines in October 1899 and took part in Arthur MacArthur Jr.’s expedition near Dagupan that attempted to capture Emilio Aguinaldo. In November and December 1899, he took part in Samuel B. M. Young’s operations in Northern Luzon, which resulted in the freeing of over 2,000 Spanish prisoners, as well as several U.S. Navy sailors and American civilians.

== Continued career ==
Penn's subsequent assignments in the Philippines included acting inspector general for the 5th District (Northern Luzon), commander of a battalion in the 7th Infantry, adjutant of the 6th Separate Brigade, adjutant of the 7th Infantry Regiment, and recruiting duty in the United States. From November 1904 to April 1906, Penn served as aide-de-camp to Henry Clark Corbin while Corbin was commander of the Philippine Division, as well as performing duty as the division's inspector of small arms practice. When Corbin was promoted to lieutenant general in April 1906, Penn was promoted to temporary lieutenant colonel and served as his military secretary until Corbin retired in September.

In September 1906, Penn reverted to his permanent rank of captain and was assigned to the Army staff at the War Department. While on the Army staff, Penn performed duty as chief of staff for Brigadier General Theodore Wint during Wint's command of the Army's base of operations at Newport News, Virginia. He next attended the Army War College (1906-1907), followed by duty as an inspector of Army service schools and colleges (1907-1909). In 1910, Penn returned to the Philippines to serve as adjutant of the Department of Luzon, after which he served as adjutant of the 12th Infantry Regiment at Fort William McKinley and commander of a provisional battalion.

In 1911, Penn was assigned as inspector and instructor of the Nebraska Militia. In 1914, he was posted to Hawaii as adjutant of the 1st Infantry Regiment.

== Pancho Villa Expedition ==
In 1916, Penn was promoted to colonel and assigned as commander of the 3rd Infantry Regiment at Madison Barracks, New York. When the regiment was dispatched to Texas during the Pancho Villa Expedition, Penn commanded it as it patrolled the Texas-Mexico border from bases at Fort Sam Houston and Camp Eagle Pass.

When the Army began to expand in anticipation of U.S. entry into World War I, Penn was assigned command the newly-organized 37th Infantry Regiment, which he equipped and trained at Fort Sam Houston.

== World War I ==
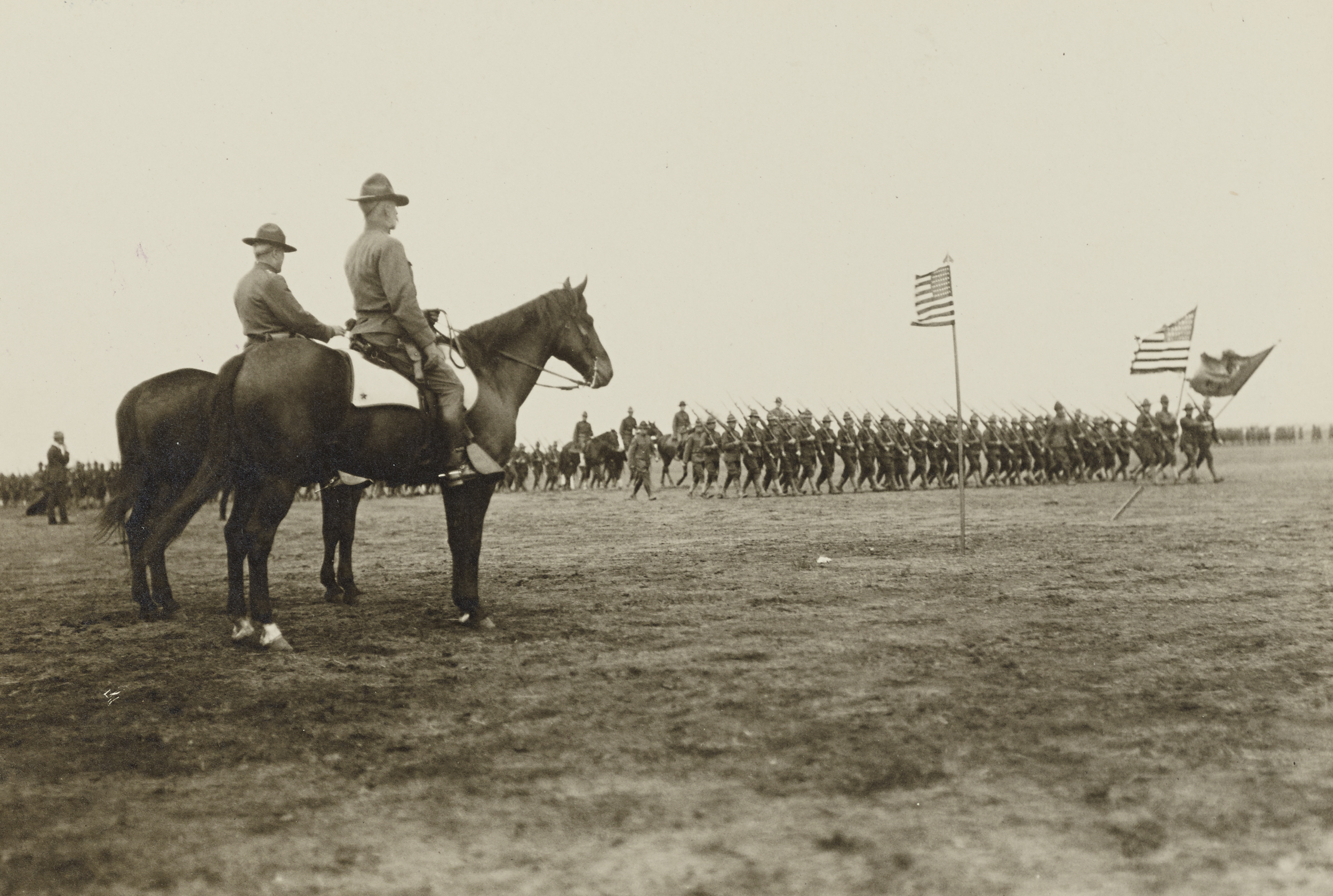
Major General Chase Wilmot Kennedy and Brigadier General Penn reviewing troops at Camp Custer, Michigan, May 1918.

After the American entry into World War I, Penn was assigned to the headquarters staff of the Army's Central Department, based in Chicago, and performed inspections of military bases and training facilities.

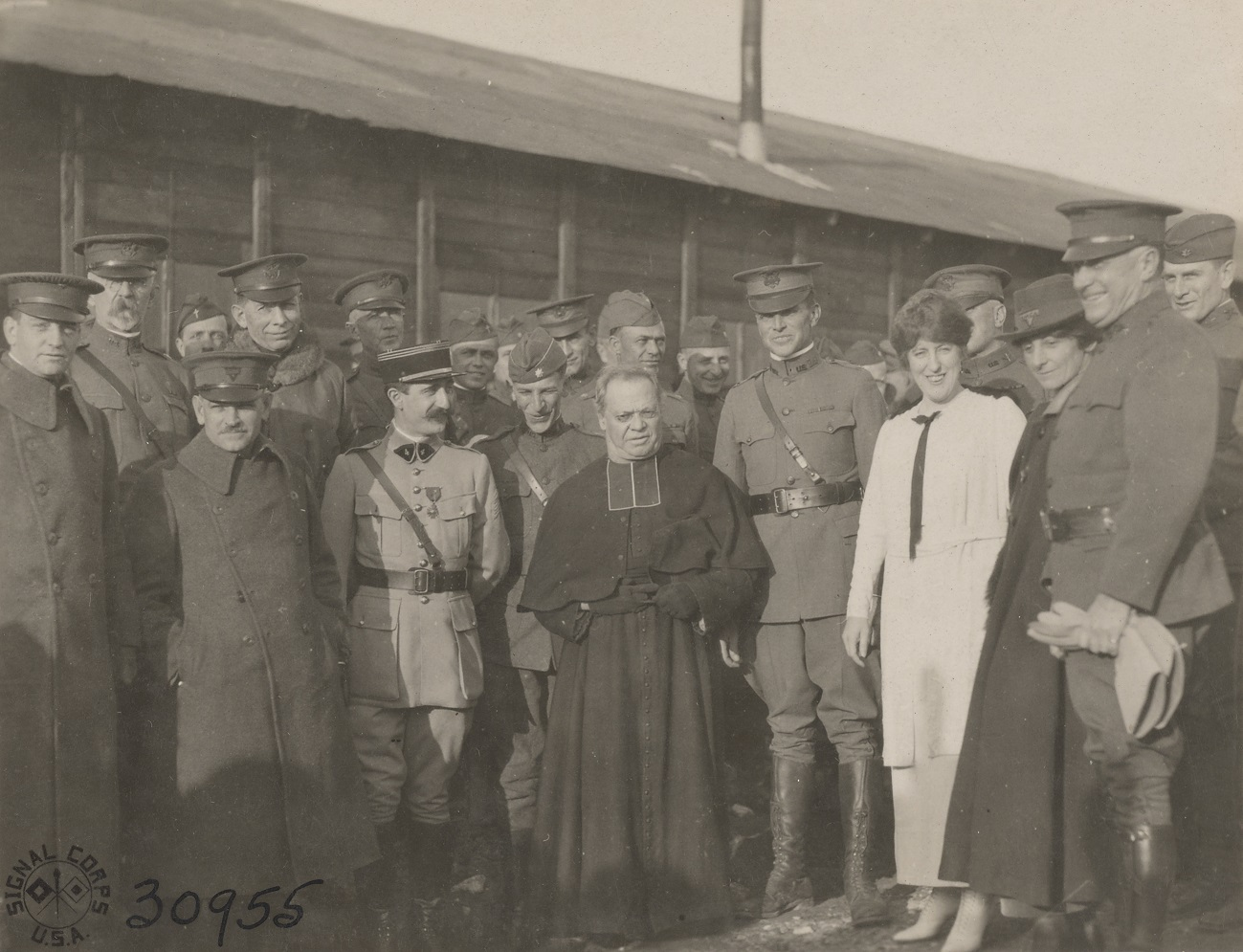
Penn second from left (beard and mustache) at opening of 1500th YMCA Center in France, November 10, 1918.

In August 1917, Penn was promoted to temporary brigadier general and appointed to command the 170th Brigade, a unit of the 85th Division. After organizing and training his brigade at Camp Custer, Michigan, Penn led it to France in the summer of 1918.

Upon arrival in France, Penn was assigned to the American Expeditionary Forces headquarters as Chief of the Personnel Division and as an observer with the 2nd Division during the Meuse-Argonne Offensive. He was then assigned as commander of 76th Brigade, 38th Division.

In December 1918, a month after the Armistice with Germany which ended hostilities, Penn returned to the United States and served as commander of Camp Zachary Taylor, Kentucky.

== Post-World War I ==
Following World War I, Penn reverted to his permanent rank of colonel. He served in the office of the Army adjutant general as head of the War Prisoners section and then the General Prisoners section, and was responsible for supervising individuals incarcerated during the war as conscientious objectors and deserters.

In 1922, Penn was assigned as adjutant of the Third Corps Area at Fort Howard, Maryland, and in the summer of that year performed additional duty as honorary aide-de-camp to President Warren G. Harding in Ohio during celebrations to commemorate the 100th anniversary of Ulysses S. Grant’s birth. From 1922 to 1924, Penn was commandant of the U.S. Disciplinary Barracks at Governors Island, New York. Penn became ill in late 1924 and retired in December as the result of his disabilities.

== Retirement ==
In retirement, Penn returned to Batavia, Ohio, where he lived in the Penn family home with his sister Jennie. He was active in the local Methodist church and several civic and fraternal organizations. Penn attained the 32nd Degree in the Scottish Rite Masons, and maintained Masonic memberships including the lodge at Sackets Harbor, New York, the Army Square Club on Governors Island, and the Scottish Rite Valley of Columbus, Ohio. By virtue of his Philippines service, Penn was a member of the Military Order of the Carabao.

A lifelong bachelor, Penn was reportedly unusually generous with friends and relatives, including fully financing the college educations of his sister and several women in Batavia, as well as providing partial financing for numerous others. In 1930, Congress passed legislation allowing general officers from World War I to retire at the highest rank they had held, and Penn was restored to brigadier general on the army's retired list.

== Death and burial ==
Penn died in Batavia on May 13, 1934. He was buried at Batavia Union Cemetery.

== Effective dates of promotion ==
Penn's dates of rank were:

- Second Lieutenant (Regular Army), July 1, 1886
- First Lieutenant (Regular Army), July 29, 1893
- Captain (Volunteer), May 30, 1898
- Major (Volunteer), July 1, 1899
- Captain (Regular Army), November 17, 1904
- Lieutenant Colonel (Volunteer), April 24, 1906
- Captain (Regular Army), September 17, 1906
- Major (Regular Army), August 10, 1909
- Lieutenant Colonel (Regular Army), October 7, 1915
- Colonel (Regular Army), March 2, 1917
- Brigadier General (National Army), August 5, 1917
- Colonel (Regular Army), March 1, 1919
- Colonel (Retired List), December 5, 1924
- Brigadier General (Retired List), June 21, 1930

== Awards ==
In 1934, Penn was a recipient of the Silver Star for heroism in the December 1899 Northern Luzon engagements that resulted in the liberation of several U.S. Navy sailors and American civilians who had been held prisoner by Filipino insurgents. His awards included:

- Silver Star
- Spanish War Service Medal
- Mexican Border Service Medal
- World War I Victory Medal

== Family ==
Penn was a cousin of Major General Thomas Q. Ashburn and Colonel Percy Moreau Ashburn.

== Bibliography ==
- Andrews, Avery Delano (1911). 1886-1911: In Commemoration of the 25th Anniversary of Graduation of the Class of '86, U.S.M.A. West Point, June, 1911. Philadelphia, PA: The Holmes Press.
- Association of Graduates of the United States Military Academy (1935). Sixty-Sixth Annual Report. Newburgh, NY: Moore Printing Company. Archived from the original on 2019-02-10.
- Cullum, George W.; Donaldson, Wm. H. (1930). Biographical Register of the Officers and Graduates of the U.S. Military Academy. Vol. Supplement, Volume VII. Crawfordsville, IN and Chicago, IL: R. R. Donnelley & Sons Company and The Lakeside Press.
- Davis, Henry Blaine Jr. (1998). Generals in Khaki. Raleigh, NC: Pentland Press. pp. 295–296. ISBN 978-1-57197-088-6.
- Perry, John (2011). Pershing: Commander of the Great War. Nashville, TN: Thomas Nelson, Inc. ISBN 978-1-59555-355-3.
