= Clermont County Courthouse =

Local government building in Ohio, US

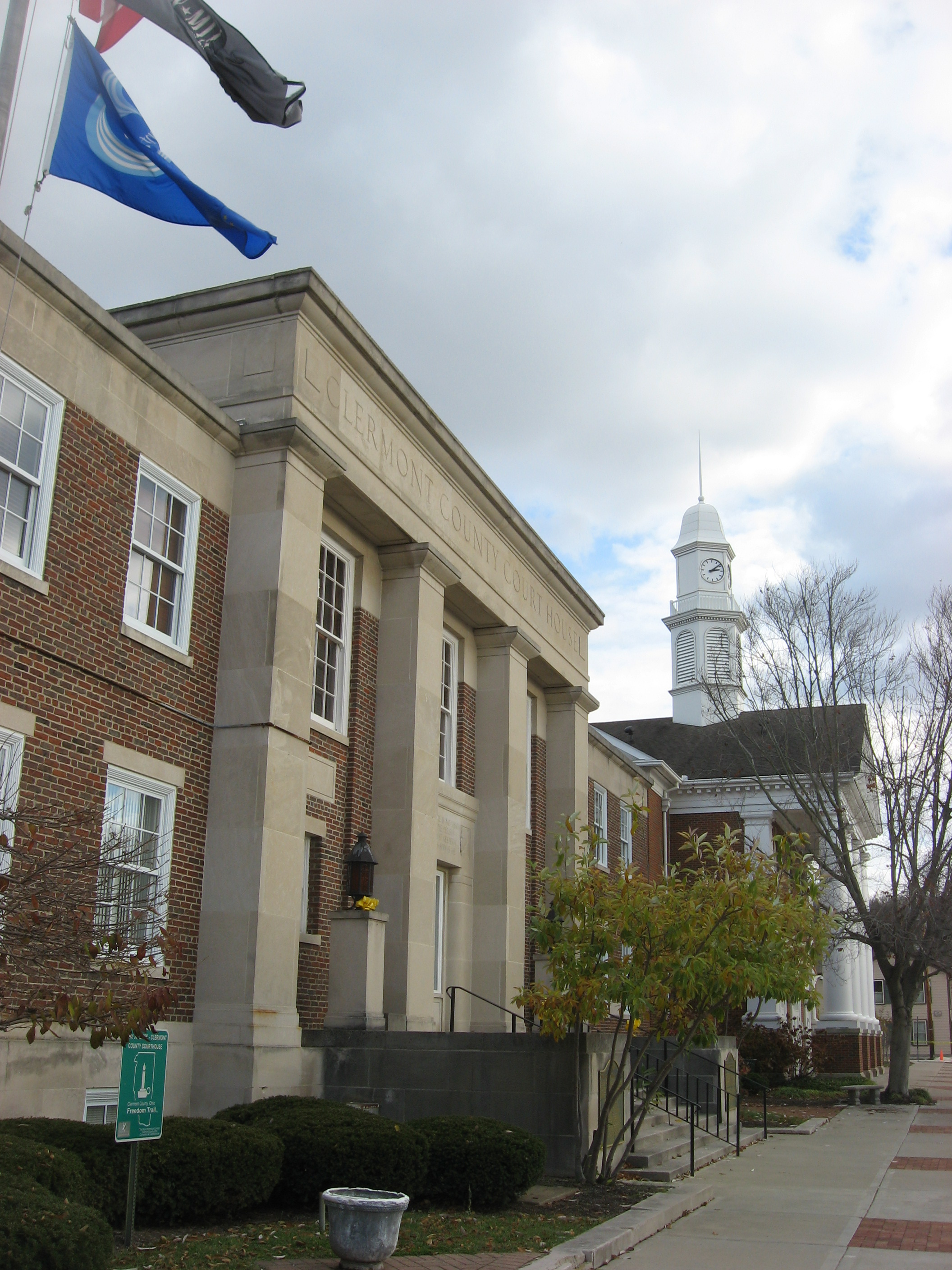
- Interactive map of the Clermont County Courthouse area

General information
- Architectural style: Neoclassical style
- Location: Batavia, Ohio, United States
- Coordinates: 39°4′38″N 84°10′45″W
- Construction started: 1935
- Completed: 1936
- Cost: $100,000
- Client: Clermont County Commissioners

Design and construction
- Architects: Old: Hunt & Allan; Addition: Steinkamp, Steinkamp & Hampton

The Clermont County Courthouse is located at 270 East Main Street in Batavia, Ohio. It was built by the Works Progress Administration and opened in 1936.

== Previous buildings ==
Clermont County was established in 1804 under an enabling act passed by the Ohio General Assembly. The county seat was located at Williamsburg and construction of a courthouse began soon after. The cost of the courthouse was $1,499 and was designed by Nicholas Sinks. The two-story stone structure was rectangular and was located in the public square. The courthouse remained in use until 1823.

When Brown County was established in 1817, a large chunk of Clermont County went with it. During this time the General Assembly moved the county seat to New Richmond despite protests from Williamsburg. A site was planned and set aside for the courthouse in New Richmond but nothing was ever built. The General Assembly convened again and changed the county seat to Batavia on February 24, 1824.

The Commissioners held a contest for the design of the courthouse and chose the plans from Ezekiel Dimmit for $3,484. The courthouse was designed in a combination of the Federal and Greek Revival styles. The building was rectangular in shape and contained a central projection containing a clock and capped by a cupola. The courthouse remained in service for nearly 108 years, until the county decided a larger courthouse was needed. Unfortunately for the county, an elaborate replacement was not feasible, due to the Great Depression.

== Current building ==
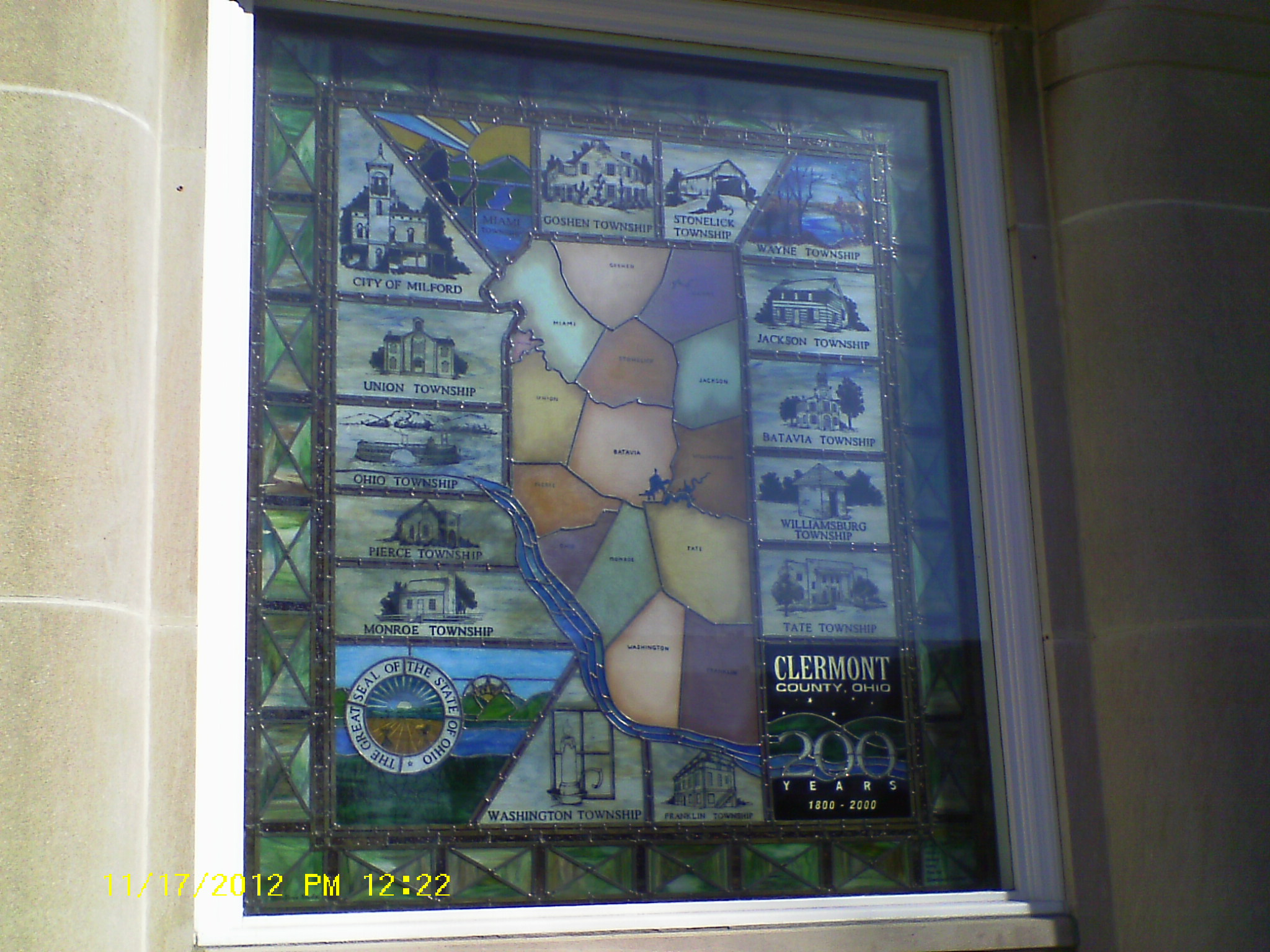
A stained glass window at the courthouse celebrates the county's bicentennial in 2000 with a map of the county's 14 townships and the City of Milford.

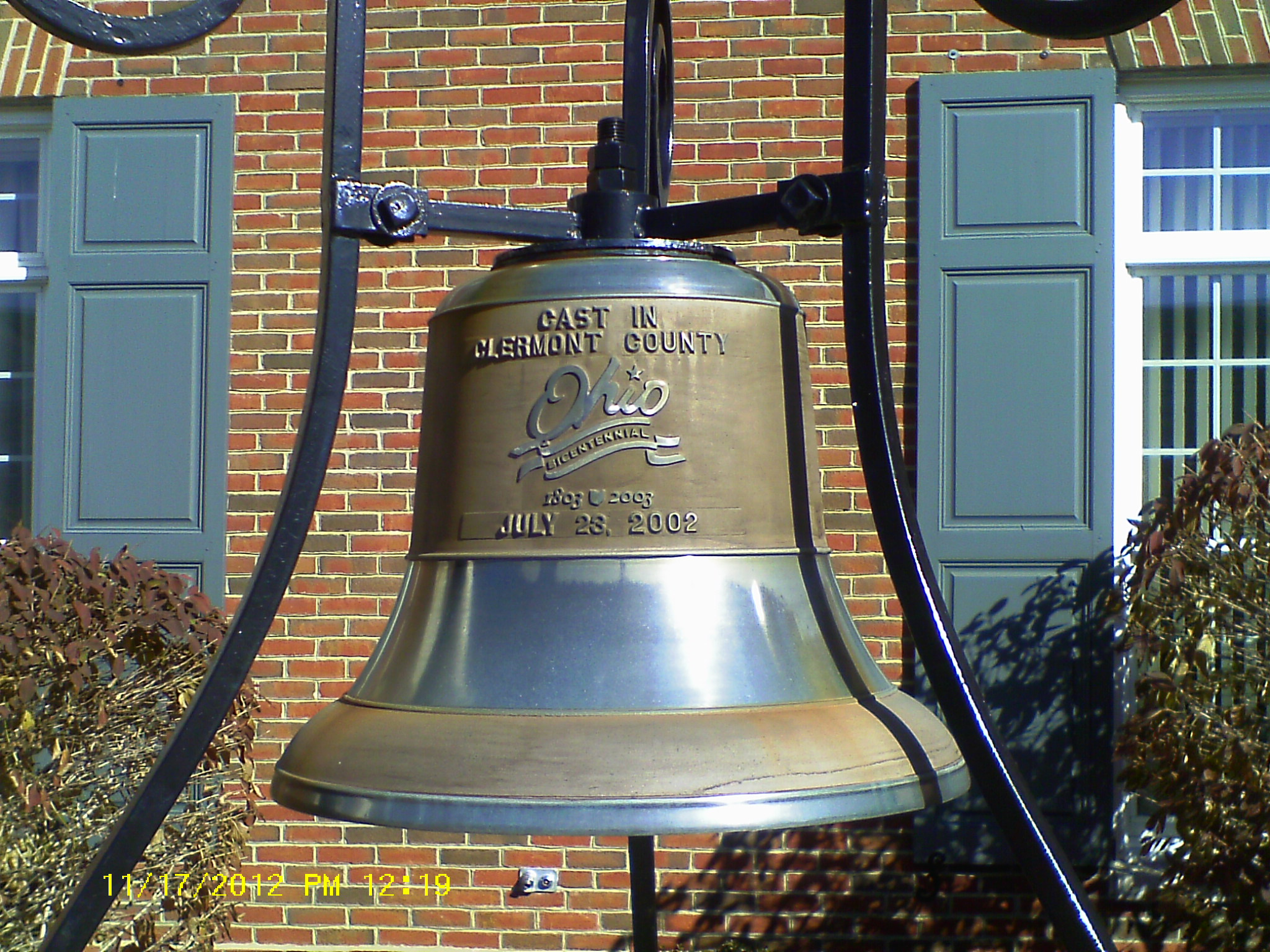
The Clermont County Bicentennial Bell hangs in front of courthouse, commemorating the Ohio Bicentennial in 2003.

The current courthouse was designed by the architectural firm of Hunt & Allan in the Neoclassical style for $100,000. The building has a rectangular footprint and is three stories high. The facade of the building is lined with red brick and limestone trimwork. The building's main entrance is accessed by a flight of stairs and is framed by four large Tuscan piers supporting an entablature above. A window is located to each side of the central door with a window directly in line on the second floor. The wings to either side of the entrance projection contains three windows on each floor. The flat roof is hidden behind a solid balustrade.

An addition behind the old courthouse was finished in 1998. The design was approved by the commissioners and was submitted by Steinkamp, Steinkamp & Hampton. The building was designed in Greek Revival style and contains a central pediment supported by Tuscan columns with brick bases. The pediment contains an elliptical window. A drum rises from the roofline and is topped by a clock tower capped by a dome.
