= 37th Infantry Regiment (United States) =

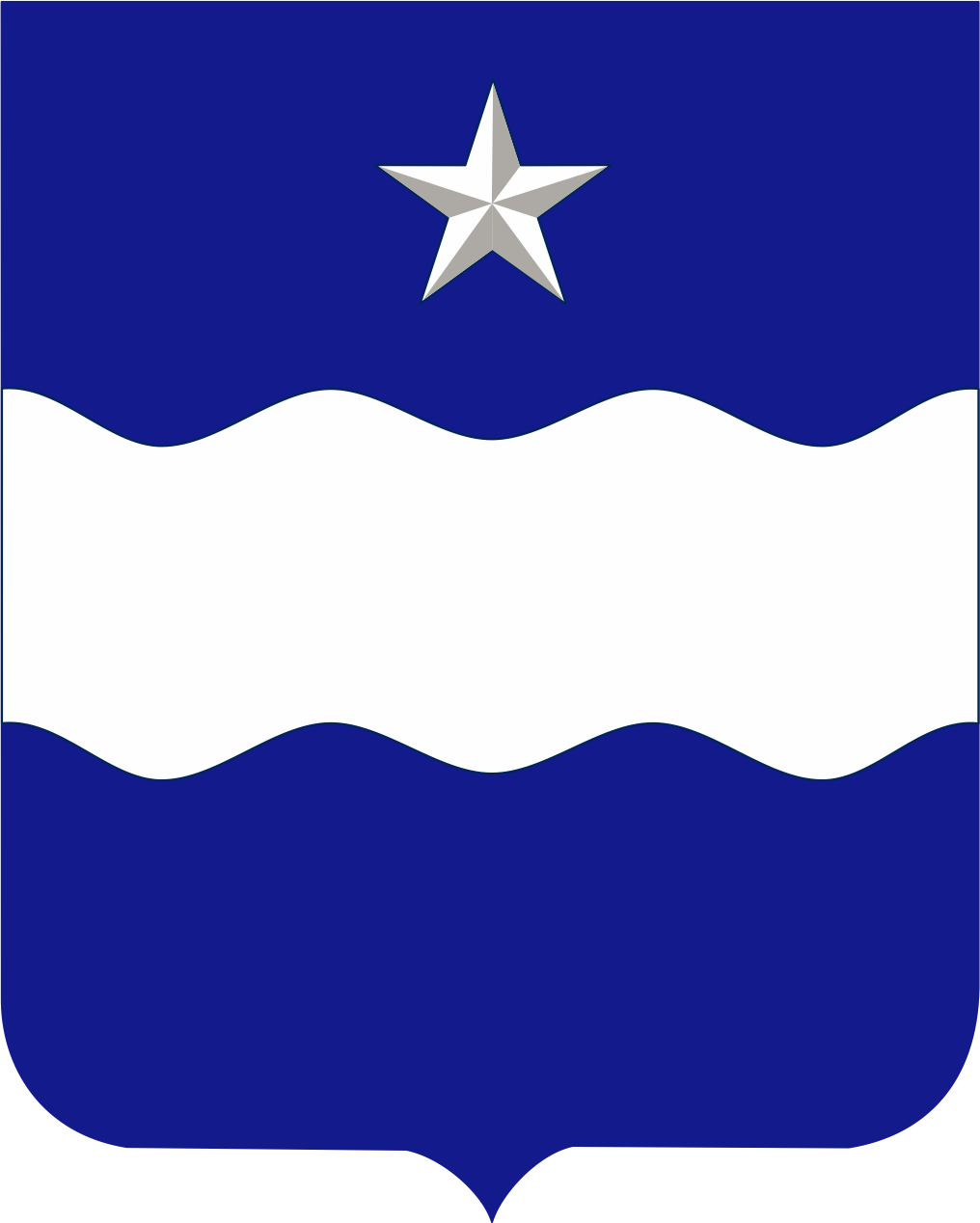
- Coat of arms
- Active: 1916-1921; 1926-1945; 1946-1949
- Country: United States
- Branch: United States Army
- Type: Infantry
- Size: Regiment
- Motto: "For Freedom"
- Colors: Blue

Commanders
- Notable commanders: Frederick B. Shaw; Julius A. Penn

Insignia
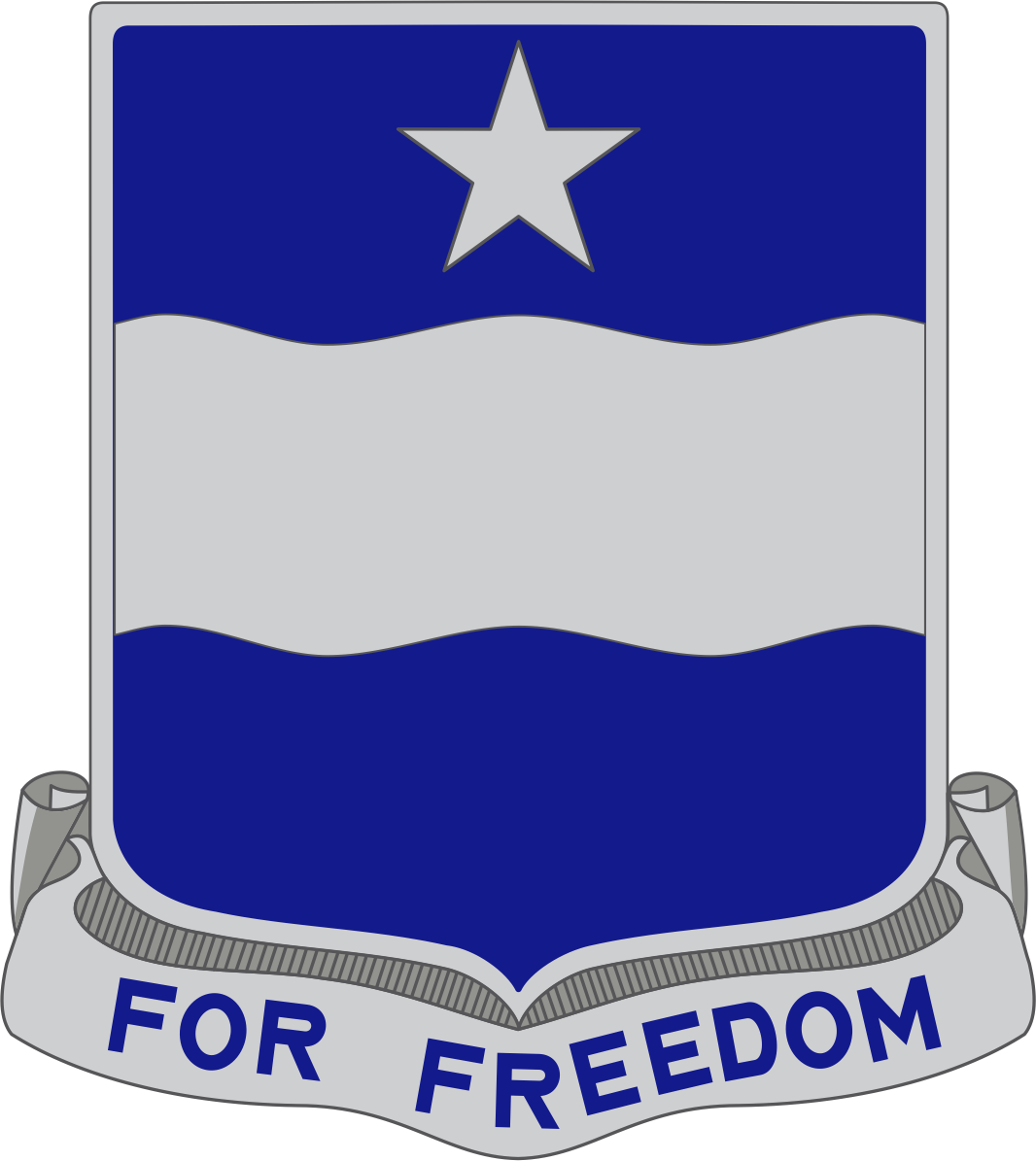
- Distinctive unit insignia

The 37th Infantry Regiment is an inactive infantry regiment in the United States Army. It was active at the Texas-Mexican Border during World War I and the Aleutian Islands in World War II.

== Other units called "37th Infantry Regiment" ==
Constituted July 28, 1866, in the Regular Army by act of the United States Congress falling under the command of the Department of the Missouri. The unit began as the 3rd Battalion of the 19th Infantry Regiment when it was re-designated as the 37th Infantry Regiment, at Little Rock Arsenal, Arkansas. Consolidated 17 April 1869 by order of the Secretary of War, when the total number of Infantry Regiments were to be reduced to 25. One-half of the 37th Infantry Regiment consolidated August–December 1869 with the 3rd Infantry Regiment and the consolidated unit was designated as the 3d Infantry Regiment. While the remaining half of the 37th Infantry consolidated in June 1869 with the 5th Infantry Regiment and redesignated as the 5th Infantry Regiment.

== History ==
=== World War I ===
The regiment was constituted on 1 July 1916 in the Regular Army as the 37th Infantry, and organized on 12 July 1916 at Fort Sam Houston, Texas, from personnel of the 3rd, 9th, and 30th Infantry Regiments, including Colonel Julius Penn, who left command of the 3rd Infantry to organize and train the 37th.

=== Interwar period ===
The 37th Infantry was stationed at Fort McIntosh, Texas, as of June 1919 as a separate regiment. It was responsible for the Laredo District of the Mexican Border Patrol. The 2nd Battalion was transferred in 1920 to Camp Marfa, Texas. The regiment, less the 3rd Battalion, was transferred on 17 October 1920 to Fort Wayne, Michigan. Concurrently, the 3rd Battalion was transferred to Fort Brady, Michigan.

The 37th Infantry Regiment and its 3rd Battalion from Fort Wayne and Fort Brady respectively, went to Camp Grayling to train Michigan National Guard troops between 15 June 1921 and 27 August 1921. They drilled the Michigan National Guard in shooting and Army maneuvers. This also marked the first time soldiers from the Regular Army did shooting practice at Camp Grayling.

The regiment was inactivated on 20 October 1921 at Fort Wayne, and the personnel were transferred to the 54th Infantry Regiment. The 18th Infantry Regiment had previously been designated as Active Associate for the 37th Infantry Regiment on 27 July 1921, and was relieved as Active Associate on 17 July 1922, with the 13th Infantry Regiment designated as Active Associate; the unit would provide the personnel from which the 37th Infantry would be reconstituted in the event of war. In June 1921 Colonel Frederick B. Shaw was assigned as commander of the 37th Infantry Regiment. The soldiers of the regiment at this time were among the last soldiers to serve under the command of General Leonard Wood who retired on April 2, 1921. Wood was in command of the Sixth Corp Area where the 37th Infantry Regiment was stationed.

The 37th Infantry Regiment was assigned to the 9th Division on 24 March 1923, and organized on 10 September 1926 with Organized Reserve personnel as a "Regular Army Inactive" (RAI) unit in the First Corps Area at large. it was withdrawn from the First Corps Area on 10 October 1926 and allotted to the Second Corps Area. Concurrently, the 13th Infantry was relieved as Active Associate. The 37th Infantry was reorganized on 9 September 1927 with Organized Reserve personnel as an RAI unit with headquarters at Brunswick, New Jersey. The regiment, less the 2nd and 3rd Battalions, was affiliated with the Rutgers University Reserve Officers' Training Corps (ROTC) program on 7 April 1928, and reorganized at Brunswick as an RAI unit with Regular Army personnel assigned to the ROTC Detachment and Reserve officers commissioned from the program. Concurrently, the 2nd Battalion was affiliated with the New York Military Academy, at Cornwall-on-Hudson, New York, and the 3rd Battalion was affiliated with the College of the City of New York ROTC program at New York City, New York. The 2nd and 3rd Battalions were relieved from the ROTC affiliation program on 5 March 1937, allotted to the Newark and Englewood Military Districts, respectively, and concurrently organized with Organized Reserve personnel living in those locations.

The regiment conducted monthly meetings at the 114th Infantry Regiment armories in Camden and Elizabeth, New Jersey, and conducted summer training most years at Camp Dix, New Jersey. The designated mobilization training station for the regiment was Camp Dix. The 37th Infantry was relieved 1 August 1940 from the 9th Division, with Reserve personnel relieved 27 July 1941 and concurrently reassigned to the 311th Infantry, 78th Division. The 37th Infantry was activated on 1 August 1941 at Unalaska, Territory of Alaska, and assigned to the Alaskan Defense Command.

=== World War II ===
The regiment moved to Adak Island on 26 November 1942 and to Atka on 24 August 1943. Arrived at Prince Rupert Port of Embarkation, British Columbia, Canada, on 28 January 1944 and departed 5 February 1944. Arrived Camp White, Oregon, 8 February 1944 under Fourth Army and attached to III Corps 15 February 1944. Transferred to Camp Phillips, Kansas, 26 April 1944 under XVI Corps and assigned to XXXVI Corps on 17 July 1944. Arrived Fort Benning, Georgia 14 August 1944 under Replacement and School Command where regiment conducted training for paratrooper volunteers from other branches of the Army. Inactivated 5 February 1945 at Fort Benning, Georgia.

=== Postwar ===
Activated 1 August 1946 at Fort Benning, Inactivated 25 January 1949 at Fort Sill, Oklahoma.

== Campaign streamers ==
World War II

- Aleutian Islands

== Distinctive unit insignia ==
- Description

A Silver color metal and enamel device 1 1/4 inches (3.2 cm) in height consisting of a shield blazoned: Azure a fess wavy, in chief a mullet both Argent. Attached below the shield a Silver scroll inscribed "FOR FREEDOM" in Blue letters.

- Symbolism

This Regiment was organized at Fort Sam Houston in 1916 and served along the Rio Grande during its first years. The shield is blue for Infantry, with a wavy fess to denote the Rio Grande and the lone star of Texas.

- Background

The distinctive unit insignia was approved on 8 January 1941.

== Coat of arms ==
- Blazon
  - Shield: Azure a fess wavy, in chief a mullet both Argent.
  - Crest: None
  - Motto FOR FREEDOM.
- Symbolism
  - Shield: This Regiment was organized at Fort Sam Houston in 1916 and served along the Rio Grande during its first years. The shield is blue for Infantry, with a wavy fess to denote the Rio Grande and the lone star of Texas.
  - Crest: None.
- Background: The coat of arms was approved on 19 January 1921. It was amended to add the motto on 8 January 1941.

== See also ==
- Distinctive unit insignia
