= Batavia, Ohio =

Village in Clermont County, Ohio, United States

- Village
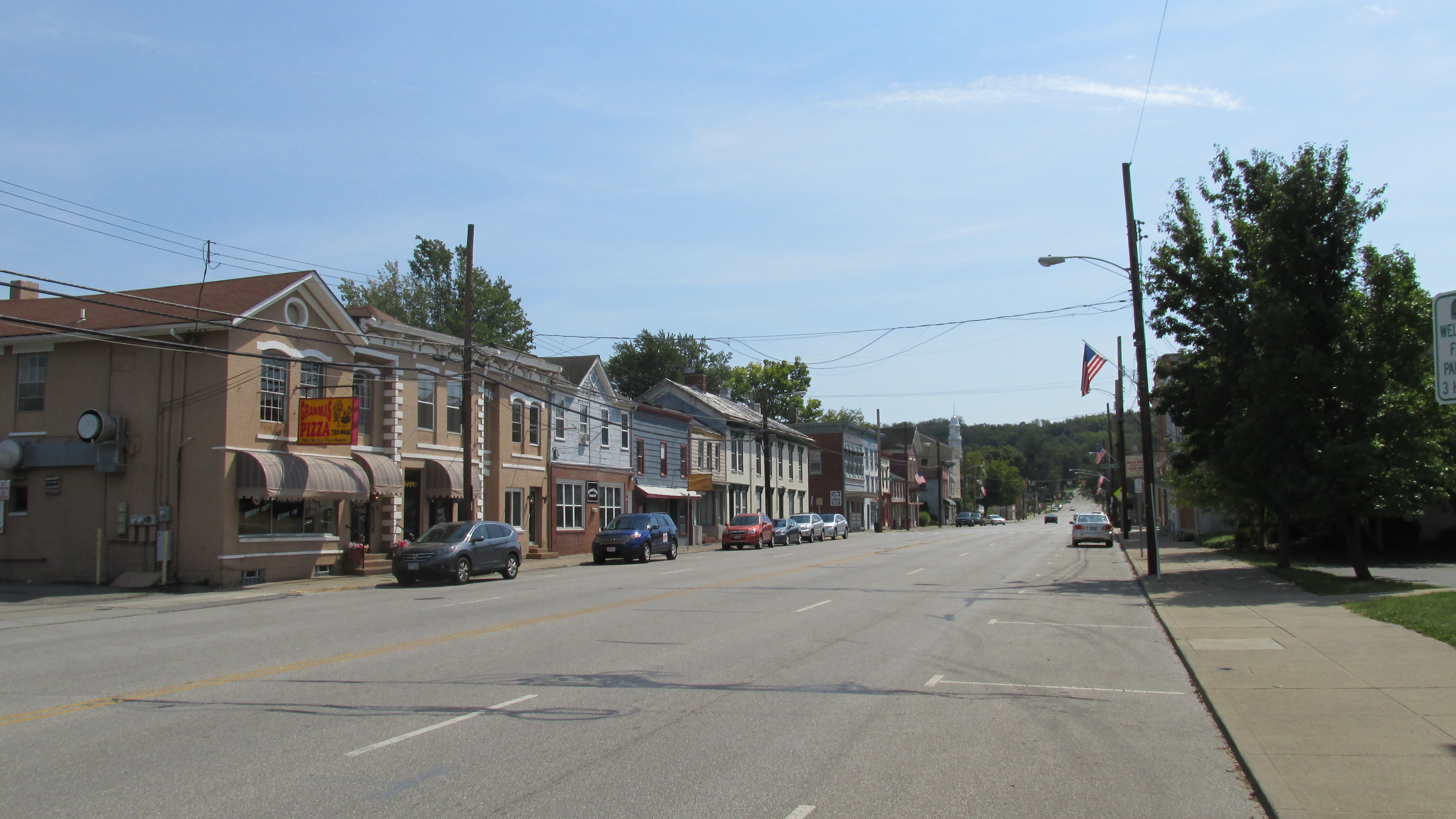
- Looking east along Main Street
- Motto: Historic past – Bright future
- Interactive map of Batavia, Ohio
- Location within Ohio Location within the United States
- Coordinates: 39°04′37″N 84°08′40″W
- Country: United States
- State: Ohio
- County: Clermont
- Township: Batavia
- Settled: Fall 1797
- Platted: October 24, 1814
- Incorporated: February 10, 1842

Government
  - Mayor: Steve Stanton

Area
  - Total: 3.22 sq mi (8.35 km^{2})
  - Land: 3.17 sq mi (8.20 km^{2})
  - Water: 0.058 sq mi (0.15 km^{2})
- Elevation: 594 ft (181 m)

Population (2020)
  - Total: 1,972
  - Estimate (2023): 2,004
  - Density: 623.0/sq mi (240.55/km^{2})
- Time zone: UTC−5 (Eastern (EST))
  - Summer (DST): UTC−4 (EDT)
- ZIP code: 45103
- Area code: 513
- FIPS code: 39-04150
- GNIS feature ID: 2398047
- Website: www.bataviaoh.gov

Batavia (/bəˈteɪviə/ bə-TAY-vee-ə) is a village in Clermont County, Ohio, United States, and its county seat. The population was 1,972 at the 2020 census. It is part of the Cincinnati metropolitan area.

== History ==
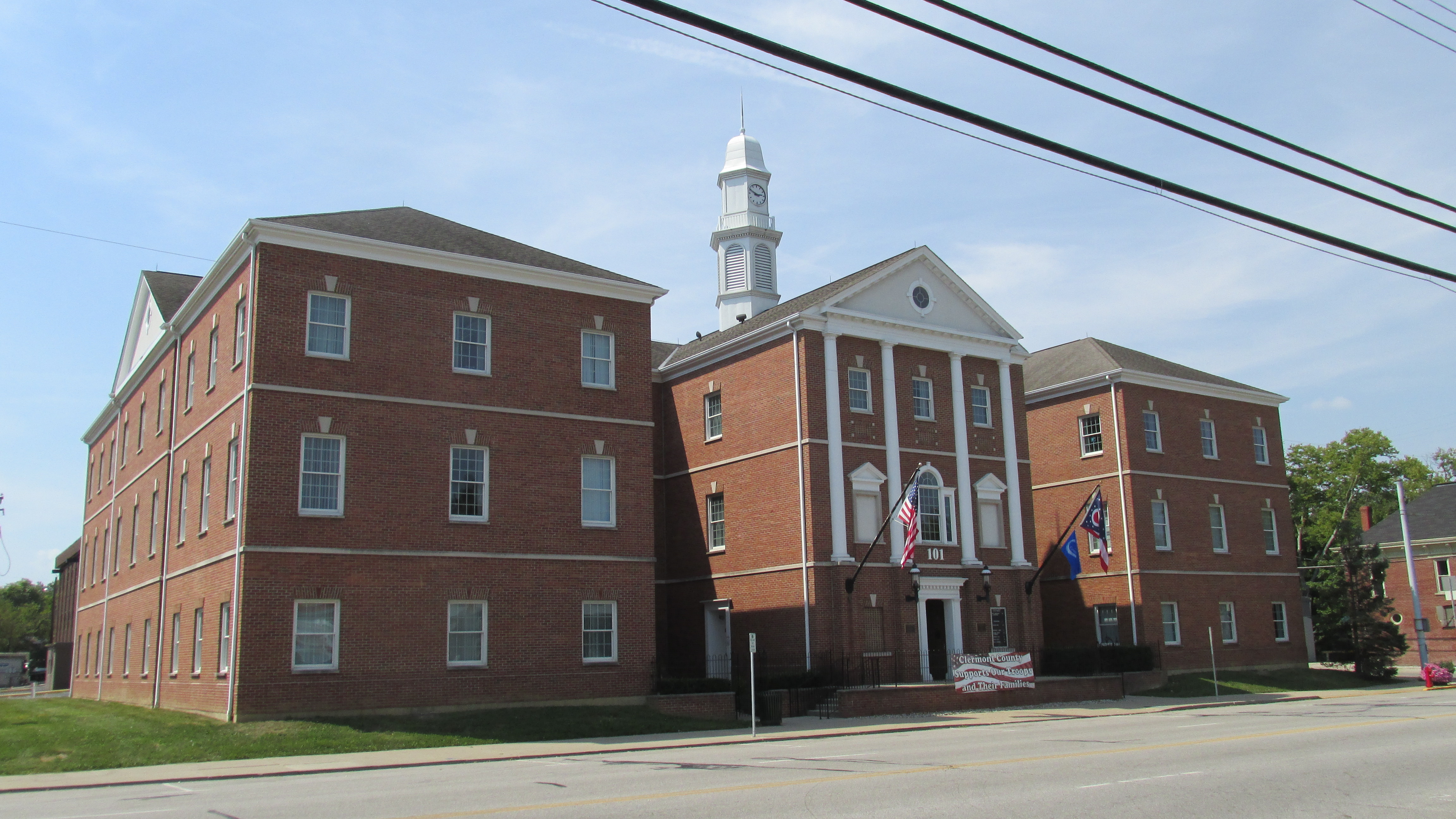
Clermont County Courthouse

Batavia was surveyed on May 28, 1788, by Captain Francis Minnis, John O'Bannon, Nicholas Keller, Archelus Price, and John Ormsley. Virginian Ezekiel Dimmitt became the area's first settler in the fall of 1797. George Ely purchased the Minnis survey in 1807 and platted the town on October 24, 1814, possibly naming it after Batavia, New York. The Clermont County seat moved from New Richmond to Batavia on February 24, 1824. Batavia finally incorporated as a village on February 10, 1842.

The Norfolk and Western Railway stopped at Batavia from March 1877 to April 1971. The Cincinnati, Georgetown and Portsmouth Railroad, an interurban railroad, also ran through town from 1903 to 1934. Norfolk Southern can sometimes pass through Batavia about 3 times a day.

A petition to dissolve the village was created in September 2024 in response to a controversial proposal for a housing development. To address the discontent, the village hired a public relations company the following April. The village subsequently attempted to convince the developers of two additional housing developments to be annexed into the municipality. As a result of this and tax abatements for the first development, Batavia Township passed a resolution in December 2025 to separate from the joint fire department with the village. The petition to dissolve the village was submitted in August 2026. However, it was rejected later that month due to invalid signatures reducing the total number of names to below the amount necessary for approval.

== Geography ==
According to the United States Census Bureau, the village has a total area of 1.62 square miles (4.20 km^{2}), of which 1.59 square miles (4.12 km^{2}) is land and 0.03 square miles (0.08 km^{2}) is water. It is surrounded by Batavia Township.

== Demographics ==
Historical population
Census	Pop.	Note	%±
1820	208		—
1830	426		104.8%
1840	350		−17.8%
1850	400		14.3%
1860	500		25.0%
1870	827		65.4%
1880	1,015		22.7%
1890	953		−6.1%
1900	1,029		8.0%
1910	1,034		0.5%
1920	1,088		5.2%
1930	1,119		2.8%
1940	1,320		18.0%
1950	1,445		9.5%
1960	1,729		19.7%
1970	1,894		9.5%
1980	1,896		0.1%
1990	1,700		−10.3%
2000	1,617		−4.9%
2010	1,509		−6.7%
2020	1,972		30.7%
2023 (est.)	2,004	▲	1.6%
U.S. Decennial Census

=== 2000 census ===
As of the census of 2000, there were 1,617 people, 651 households, and 453 families living in the village. The population density was 1,105.4 inhabitants per square mile (426.8/km^{2}). There were 696 housing units at an average density of 475.8 per square mile (183.7/km^{2}). The racial makeup of the village was 94.50% White, 3.28% African American, 0.12% Native American, 0.25% Asian, 0.06% Pacific Islander, 0.25% from other races, and 1.55% from two or more races. Hispanic or Latino of any race were 0.37% of the population.

There were 651 households, out of which 34.4% had children under the age of 18 living with them, 52.2% were married couples living together, 13.8% had a female householder with no husband present, and 30.3% were non-families. 25.7% of all households were made up of individuals, and 9.4% had someone living alone who was 65 years of age or older. The average household size was 2.48 and the average family size was 2.96.

In the village, the age distribution of the population shows 25.9% under the age of 18, 8.4% from 18 to 24, 30.2% from 25 to 44, 23.3% from 45 to 64, and 12.3% who were 65 years of age or older. The median age was 36 years. For every 100 females there were 97.2 males. For every 100 females age 18 and over, there were 92.5 males.

The median income for a household in the village was $40,804, and the median income for a family was $50,238. Males had a median income of $36,190 versus $25,583 for females. The per capita income for the village was $20,171. About 6.4% of families and 6.6% of the population were below the poverty line, including 8.4% of those under age 18 and none of those age 65 or over.

=== 2010 census ===
As of the census of 2010, there were 1,509 people, 629 households, and 411 families living in the village. The population density was 949.1 inhabitants per square mile (366.4/km^{2}). There were 713 housing units at an average density of 448.4 per square mile (173.1/km^{2}). The racial makeup of the village was 93.6% White, 3.4% African American, 0.5% Native American, 0.6% Asian, 0.1% from other races, and 1.8% from two or more races. Hispanic or Latino of any race were 0.9% of the population.

There were 629 households, of which 31.3% had children under the age of 18 living with them, 43.7% were married couples living together, 16.7% had a female householder with no husband present, 4.9% had a male householder with no wife present, and 34.7% were non-families. 30.8% of all households were made up of individuals, and 9.7% had someone living alone who was 65 years of age or older. The average household size was 2.37 and the average family size was 2.91.

The median age in the village was 37.7 years. 24.5% of residents were under the age of 18; 8.3% were between the ages of 18 and 24; 26.5% were from 25 to 44; 27.3% were from 45 to 64; and 13.5% were 65 years of age or older. The gender makeup of the village was 47.1% male and 52.9% female.

== Education ==
Batavia and the surrounding township belongs to the Batavia Local School District. The village annexed its only high school, Batavia High School, in 2012.

Batavia has a public library, a branch of the Clermont County Public Library.

== Media ==
The Clermont Sun has published weekly since 1828.

== Infrastructure ==
=== Transportation ===
Batavia is on Ohio State Route 32, also known as the Appalachian Highway, a major east–west highway that connects Interstate 275 and the Cincinnati area to the rural counties of Southern Ohio. State Routes Ohio State Route 132 and 222 also pass through Batavia's downtown area.

The Clermont Transportation Connection provides daily bus service to downtown Cincinnati. The Cincinnati Eastern Railroad (CCET) passes through Batavia.

The Clermont County Airport is located two nautical miles (2.3 mi; 3.7 km) west of Batavia's central business district.

== Notable people ==
- Audrey Bolte – beauty queen, 2012 Miss Ohio USA
- Charlie Case – baseball player, Pittsburgh Pirates
- Reader W. Clarke – lawyer, newspaper publisher and congressman
- Henry Clark Corbin – army officer, Adjutant General of the U.S. Army
- William Howard – soldier, lawyer, and congressman
- George W. Hulick – teacher, lawyer, soldier, judge, and congressman
- Josephine Johnson – novelist, 1935 Pulitzer Prize for Fiction winner
- Charles Cyrus Kearns – lawyer and congressman
- Keith Matthew Maupin – soldier
- Earl Mossor – baseball player, Brooklyn Dodgers
- Bill Mussey – journalist and Ohio state congressman
- Hugh L. Nichols – politician and judge, Lieutenant Governor of Ohio and Chief Justice of the Ohio Supreme Court
- Joel Peckham – poet
- Julius Penn – army officer
- Gene Schott – baseball player, Cincinnati Reds
- Joe Smith – baseball player, Houston Astros
- Philip Bergen Swing – United States federal judge, S.D. Ohio
- Murray Thurston Titus – Christian missionary to India
