= Frederick B. Shaw =

United States Army general

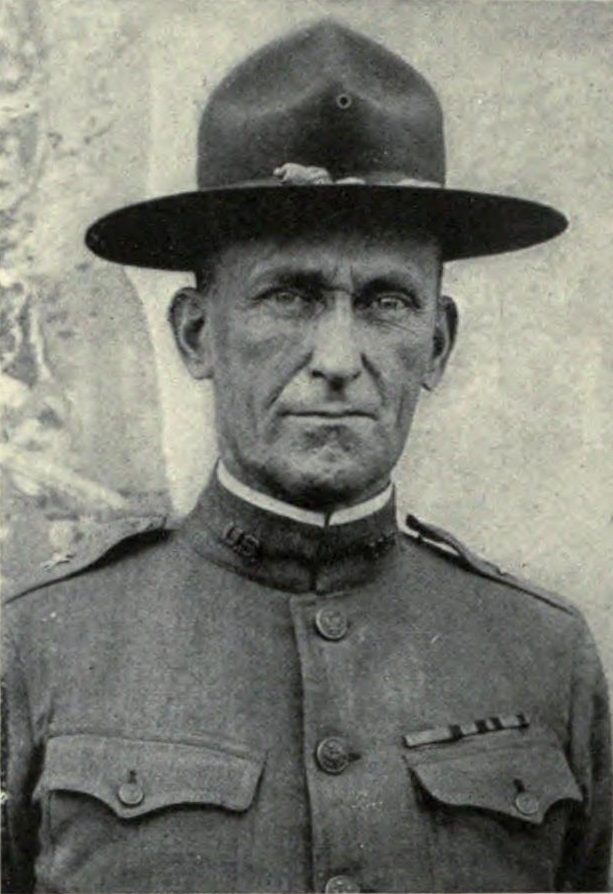
- Shaw in uniform, c. 1918
- Born: Frederick Benjamin Shaw; June 24, 1869; Burlington, Pennsylvania, U.S.
- Died: March 1, 1957 (aged 87); Washington, D.C., U.S.
- Burial place: Arlington National Cemetery; 38°52′45.1″N 77°04′19.8″W
- Spouse(s): Mary Davis (Bell) Macfarlane (m. 1908-1946, her death); Winifred F. Rankin (m. 1950-1957, his death)
- Children: 4
- Military career
- Allegiance: United States
- Branch: Army
- Service years: 1892–1933
- Rank: Brigadier General
- Commands: Fort Brady; 162d Depot Brigade; 2d Replacement Brigade; 36th Infantry Brigade, 18th Division; 2d Infantry
- Conflicts: Spanish–American War; Philippine–American War; Pancho Villa Expedition; World War I
- Other work: Author

Frederick B. Shaw (June 24, 1869 – March 1, 1957) was a senior officer of the United States Army. A veteran of the Spanish–American War, Philippine–American War, Pancho Villa Expedition, and World War I, he attained the rank of brigadier general and is best known for commanding the 162d Depot Brigade and 36th Infantry Brigade, 18th Division.

== Early life and career ==
Frederick Benjamin Shaw was born in Burlington, Pennsylvania, on June 24, 1869, a son of a son of Charles David and Mary Helen (Dickinson) Shaw. (Note: Davis incorrectly gives Shaw's birthplace as Burlington, New Jersey and misspells his first name as "Fredrick".) He was raised and educated in Smithfield Township, Pennsylvania, and Elmira, New York, then worked as a schoolteacher. He later became a reporter and editor for several Chemung County newspapers and joined the New York National Guard's 30th Separate Company.

In 1892, Shaw quit the newspaper business with the intent of pursuing a full-time military career. He joined the United States Army as a private in November 1892 and was assigned to Company A, 21st Infantry. Shaw served in the enlisted ranks for three years and attained the rank of corporal. In March 1896, Shaw passed the examination for appointment as an officer. He was commissioned as a second lieutenant of Infantry and assigned to the 5th Infantry Regiment at Fort McPherson, Georgia.

== War with Spain ==
At the start of the War with Spain in 1898, the 5th Infantry was ordered to guard duty at ports and military facilities on the coast of South Carolina. The regiment was later ordered to the Tampa, Florida port of embarkation, where Shaw was assigned as quartermaster and commissary officer of the Independent Regular Brigade commanded by Theodore Schwan. When Schwan's brigade was ordered to Puerto Rico, Shaw took part in the subsequent campaign, including combat at Hormigueros.

Shaw subsequently reported to the 5th Infantry during the occupation of Cuba, where he discovered that he had been promoted to first lieutenant and assigned to the 19th Infantry in Puerto Rico. Upon returning to Puerto Rico, Shaw found that his new regiment had been ordered to the Philippines. He served there from 1899 to 1901, including participation in the 1899 to 1900 Panay campaign of the Philippine Insurrection.

== Interwar period ==
Shaw was promoted to captain in 1901. In 1903 he was assigned to the 30th Infantry and performed temporary duty at Fort Crook, Nebraska, until joining his regiment at Fort Logan H. Roots, Arkansas, in 1904. In 1905, he performed temporary duty as an inspector of the Arkansas National Guard. In 1906, he graduated from the Infantry and Cavalry School at Fort Leavenworth, Kansas (now the Command and General Staff College). In 1907 he was again serving with the 30th Infantry, and was an inspector and advisor during the Arkansas National Guard's annual training period.

From 1908 to 1909, Shaw served with the 30th Infantry during its posting to Manila in the Philippines. After returning to the United States he was assigned to temporary recruiting duty and assigned to Fort Slocum, New York. In 1911 he rejoined his regiment, which was stationed in San Diego. In 1912, Shaw transferred to the 8th Infantry and he again served in the Philippines. After returning to the United States in 1913, he was transferred to the 26th Infantry Regiment. In 1914, he was posted to Fort Brady, Michigan, where he was assigned as post commander and quartermaster. In 1916, Shaw rejoined the 30th Infantry at Plattsburgh Barracks, New York.

== World War I ==
In July 1916, Shaw was promoted to major and assigned to the 36th Infantry, which performed duty on the Texas-Mexico border during the Mexican Expedition.

After the American entry into World War I, which occurred in April 1917, the 36th Infantry was ordered to Fort Snelling, Minnesota, where some of its experienced noncommissioned officers and soldiers from its ranks were reassigned to form the nucleus of two new infantry regiments, the 40th and the 41st.

Shaw was promoted to temporary colonel in August 1917 and assigned as chief of staff of the 87th Division at Camp Pike, Arkansas. He was subsequently assigned to command the 162d Depot Brigade at Camp Pike, followed by assignment as commander of the 2d Replacement Brigade at Camp Gordon, Georgia.

In October 1918, Shaw was promoted to temporary brigadier general and assigned to command the 36th Infantry Brigade, a subordinate command of the 18th Division based at Camp Travis, Texas. He also served as acting division commander on several occasions. The armistice that ended the war in November ended the need for the 18th Division to organize and train for combat, and it was inactivated in February 1919.

== After World War I ==
In February 1919, Shaw reverted to his permanent rank of major and was assigned as head of recruiting for the Army's Northeastern District, based in Boston. In January 1920, he was promoted to lieutenant colonel, and in July he was promoted to colonel. In 1921, Shaw graduated from the Infantry Field Officers Course at Fort Benning, Georgia. In June 1921, he was assigned to the 37th Infantry Regiment at Fort Wayne, Michigan. Later that year, he was reassigned as senior instructor and advisor for the West Virginia National Guard. In 1923, he was assigned as chief of National Guard affairs for the Fifth Corps Area, based at Fort Benjamin Harrison, Indiana.

In 1926 he was assigned as chief of the training section of the Militia Bureau staff. In 1928, he was assigned to command the 2d Infantry at Fort Sheridan, Illinois. In 1930, Shaw was assigned as senior instructor and advisor for the Kentucky and Indiana National Guards.

== Death and legacy ==
Shaw reached the mandatory retirement age of 64 and left the Army as a colonel on June 30, 1933. As the result of a 1930 law allowing World War I general officers to retire at the highest rank they had held during the war, Shaw was promoted to brigadier general on the Army's retired list. In retirement, he was a resident of Arlington, Virginia. Shaw died in Washington, D.C., on March 1, 1957. His funeral was held at the Fort Myer chapel and he was buried at Arlington National Cemetery.

Shaw was the author of two books, 1930's One Hundred and Forty Years of Service in Peace and War: History of the Second Infantry, United States Army and 1942's History of the Shaw Family and Descendants of Anthony Shaw, the First American Ancestor, Who Arrived Before 1653. He was a member of The Society of the Cincinnati as a collateral descendant of Captain Sylvanus Shaw (1750–1777) of the Continental Army's 2nd Rhode Island Regiment. In addition, he was a Mason and a member of the Military Order of the Carabao by virtue of his service in the Philippines.

== Personal life ==
In 1908, Shaw married Mary Davis (Bell) Macfarlane (1879–1946). With her first husband, Mary Shaw was the mother of Marion Macfarlane, the wife of Army major general Howard L. Peckham. Frederick and Mary Shaw were the parents of four children—Helen Barbara, Frederick Benjamin Jr., Robert Champlain, and Daniel Joseph. In 1950, Shaw married Winifred F. Rankin (1888–1966).

== Effective dates of promotion ==
Second Lieutenant, March 23, 1896
First Lieutenant, August 22, 1898
Captain, April 15, 1901
Major, July 1, 1916
Colonel (temporary), August 5, 1917
Brigadier General (temporary), October 1, 1918
Major, February 1, 1919
Lieutenant Colonel, January 6, 1920
Colonel, July 1, 1920
Brigadier General (Retired List), June 30, 1933
