= Thomas Q. Ashburn (general) =

United States Army general (1874–1941)

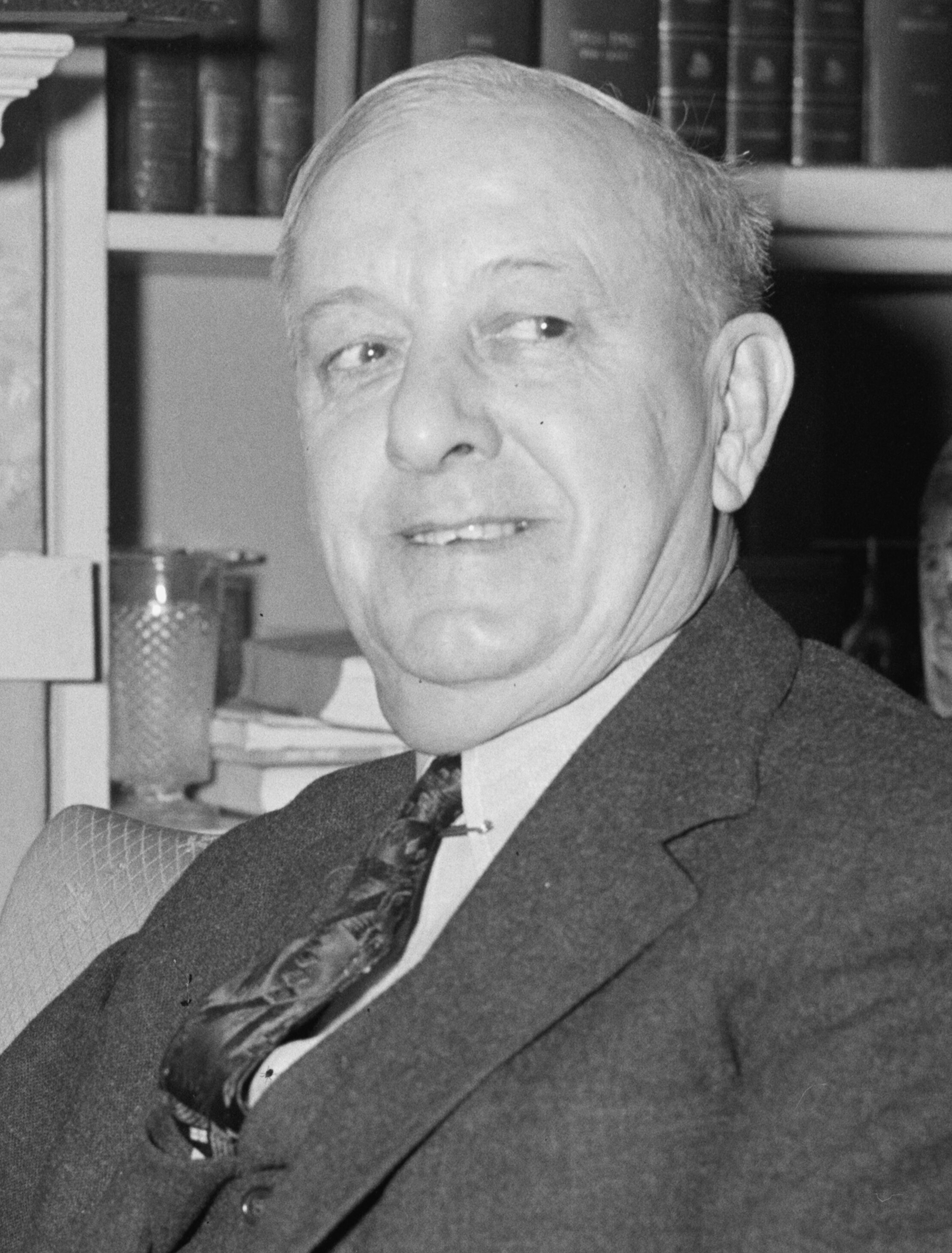
- Born: November 17, 1874; Batavia, Ohio, US
- Died: May 2, 1941 (aged 66)
- Relatives: Col. Percy Moreau Ashburn (brother); BG. Julius Penn (cousin)
- Military career
- Allegiance: United States
- Branch: United States Army
- Service years: 1897–1938
- Rank: Major General
- Service number: 0-575
- Awards: Silver Citation Star, Croix de Guerre, Legion of Honor, Distinguished Service Medal

Thomas Q. Ashburn (November 17, 1874 – May 2, 1941) was a United States Army major general active during World War I. Ashburn wrote a unit history of the 324th Field Artillery Brigade as well as articles on waterways, rivers, forest fires, and transportation.

== Early life ==
Ashburn was born in Batavia, Ohio. He graduated number sixty-one of sixty-seven from the United States Military Academy in 1897.

== Career ==
Ashburn's first duty was with the 25th Infantry at Fort Missoula, in Montana, after which he was transferred to the artillery. Ashburn was commissioned a captain in the 34th United States Volunteer Infantry and was shipped to the Philippines.

In May 1900, he commanded one column of the pursuit of Emilio Aguinaldo. He was made a brevet major for gallantry in action at San Jacinto on November 11, 1899. From 1901 to 1902, Ashburn was the aide to General Arthur MacArthur, after which he was stationed in Cuba to command the 18th, 19th, and 24th Companies of Coast Artillery. He returned from Cuba in 1903, graduated from the School of Submarine Defense in 1907, and served a second tour in the Philippines. During World War I, Ashburn commanded and took to France the 324th Field Artillery Brigade and the 158th Field Artillery in 1918.

Ashburn became chairman of the advisory board of the Inland Waterways Corporation and was made a brigadier general in 1924. In 1927, he became a major general. In 1938, he retired from the army, but remained with the Inland Waterways Corporation until 1939.

== Awards ==
Ashburn earned a Silver Citation Star and was commended publicly and personally by General John J. Pershing. He also received both the Croix de Guerre and Legion of Honor from France, as well as the Mexican Order of Military Merit and the Distinguished Service Medal from the United States.

== Writings ==
Ashburn authored History of the 324th Field Artillery and numerous articles dealing with military matters, river transportation, and forest fires.

== Death and legacy ==
Ashburn died at age 66 on May 2, 1941.

== Family ==
In 1898 he married Frances Fee (1880–1859) and they were parents of a son, Thomas Q Ashburn Jr. 1904–1958. Colonel Percy Moreau Ashburn was his brother. Brigadier General Julius Penn was his cousin.
