= 162d Depot Brigade =

Brigade of the United States Army

- Active: 1917–1919
- Disbanded: May 1919
- Country: United States
- Branch: Army
- Type: Depot
- Role: Training and receiving
- Size: Brigade
- Garrison/HQ: Camp Pike, Arkansas
- Wars: World War I

Commanders
- Notable commanders: Brig. Gen. Benjamin A. Poore; Brig. Gen. Frederick B. Shaw

The 162d Depot Brigade was a training and receiving formation of the United States Army during World War I.

== History ==
Secretary of War Newton Baker authorized Major General Samuel Sturgis to organize the 162d Depot Brigade, an element of the 87th Division. It was later detached and placed directly under Camp Pike, Arkansas, as an independent unit. The brigade filled two purposes: one was to train replacements for the American Expeditionary Forces; the other was to act as a receiving unit for men sent to camps by local draft boards. Commanded by Brigadier General Benjamin A. Poore beginning in August 1917, during most of 1918 the brigade was commanded by Brigadier General Frederick B. Shaw.

== Purpose ==
The role of depot brigades was to receive and organize recruits, provide them with uniforms, equipment and initial military training, and then send them to France to fight on the front lines. The depot brigades also received soldiers returning home at the end of the war and completed their out processing and discharges. Depot brigades were often organized, reorganized, and inactivated as requirements to receive and train troops rose and fell, and later ebbed and flowed during post-war demobilization.

Depot brigades were organized into numbered battalions (1st Battalion, 2d Battalion, etc.), which in turn were organized into numbered companies. The major U.S. depot brigades organized for World War I, which remained active until after post-war demobilization included: 151st (Camp Devens); 152d (Camp Upton); 153d (Camp Dix); 154th (Camp Meade); 155th (Camp Lee); 156th (Camp Jackson); 157th (Camp Gordon); 158th (Camp Sherman); 159th (Camp Taylor); 160th (Camp Custer); 161st (Camp Grant); 162d (Camp Pike); 163d (Camp Dodge); 164th (Camp Funston); 165th (Camp Travis); 166th (Camp Lewis); and 167th (Camp McClellan).

== See also ==
- List of formations of the United States Army during World War I
- Timeline of World War I
- United States home front during World War I
