= Richard B. Paddock =

United States Army officer (1859–1901)

Richard Bolles Paddock
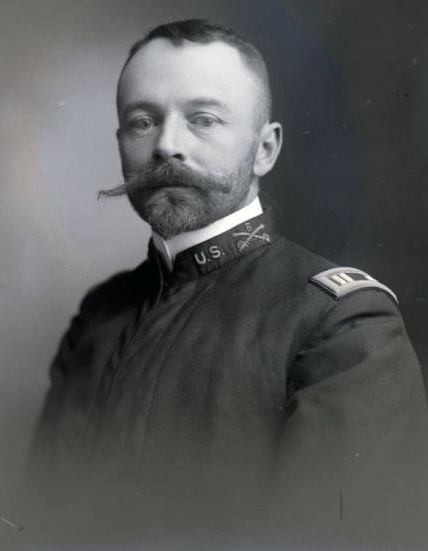
- Contemporary photo that appeared in the Chicago Tribune and other newspapers at the time of his death
- Born: December 2, 1859; Princeton, Illinois, U.S.
- Died: March 9, 1901 (aged 41) Tientsen, China
- Buried: Oakland Cemetery, Princeton, Illinois
- Allegiance: United States of America
- Branch: United States Army
- Service years: 1883–1901
- Rank: Captain
- Commands: Troop K, 6th Cavalry Regiment
- Conflicts: Indian Wars; Apache Wars; Sioux Wars; Spanish–American War; Battle of San Juan Hill; China Relief Expedition

Richard Bolles Paddock (December 2, 1859 – March 9, 1901) was a United States Army officer, close friend and brother-in-law to John J. Pershing, and one of the few American officers who died while on duty in China during the Boxer Rebellion. Paddock served in the American Southwest during the Apache Wars, as well as the Pine Ridge Campaign (1890–91), the Battle of San Juan Hill (1898) in Cuba during the Spanish–American War, and finally the China Relief Expedition (1900–01). Paddock served as a lieutenant and captain in the 13th Infantry Regiment, the 4th Cavalry Regiment, and the 6th Cavalry Regiment.

== Early life ==
Richard Paddock was born in Princeton, Illinois December 2, 1859, to Margaret Paddock and Stephen G. Paddock, Jr., the longtime Bureau County Clerk.

After graduating from Princeton High School in 1876, Richard Paddock briefly studied law with his uncle George Laban Paddock in Chicago, before returning to Princeton to work with his father in the county clerk's office.

In September 1879, Richard Paddock's brother, Lt. James V. S. Paddock, 5th Regiment U.S. Cavalry, was severely wounded by Utes at the Battle of Milk Creek in Colorado during the White River War. After hearing of his brother's injuries, Richard went to be with him in Nebraska while he recovered. Inspired by his brother's exploits, Richard soon began efforts to receive a commission in the Army.

== Receiving Army Commission ==
In March 1880, Paddock unsuccessfully requested President Hayes appoint him an officer in the Army. Undeterred, Paddock was accompanied by Senator John A. Logan in a visit to Secretary of War Robert Todd Lincoln to discuss his wishes to serve as an officer. Told the only option to become an officer was to first enlist, Paddock continued his efforts to enter as an officer. Through the work of retired Brig. Gen. Thomas J. Henderson, Paddock's congressman from Illinois, he was finally offered the opportunity to sit for examination for a commission in the Army.

In September 1883, Paddock passed the examination at Fort Monroe, Virginia, and was appointed 2nd Lieutenant, 13th Infantry Regiment.

== Stationed in the American Southwest ==
In November 1883, Paddock arrived at his first post, Fort Cummings in present-day New Mexico. In June 1884, his unit was transferred to Fort Bayard, New Mexico. Paddock received a much sought-after transfer to the 6th Cavalry in February 1885 and was soon moved to Fort Stanton, New Mexico.

During this time, Paddock served on Courts Martial and also escorted two squads of Mescalero Apache U.S. Scouts from near Fort Stanton through the San Andreas Mountains to an 8th Cavalry camp near Grafton, New Mexico, traversing the desolate area now home to the White Sands Missile Range.

== At the US Infantry and Cavalry School, Fort Leavenworth ==
In September 1885, Lt. Paddock earned a spot at the prestigious Cavalry and Infantry School at Fort Leavenworth, Kansas, later renamed the Army Command and General Staff College. For almost two years, Paddock studied subjects such as trigonometry, surveying, military law and topography.

== Meeting John Pershing and marriage to Grace Pershing ==
Back at Fort Stanton in 1887, Paddock met Lt. John J. Pershing, a recent West Point graduate. Paddock, Pershing, and another young lieutenant, Julius Penn, became close friends and lived an idyllic frontier lifestyle of hunting, carousing and visits to Mexican dances, earning the trio the nickname "The Three Green P's."

Paddock met Pershing's sister Grace while she was visiting Fort Stanton. They were married while Paddock was on leave in Chicago June 5, 1890. The families of Richard Paddock and John Pershing later lived close-by in the Hyde Park neighborhood of Chicago.

== The Sioux Campaign (1890–1891) and Wounded Knee ==
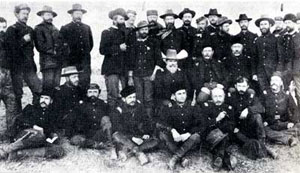
Officers of the 6th Cavalry at Wounded Knee

In 1890, the US Army was ordered to confine restive Sioux to the Pine Ridge Reservation in South Dakota. On December 29, 1890, a confrontation between these groups and the force posted at Pine Ridge, the 7th Cavalry, resulted in the Wounded Knee Massacre.

Paddock and the 6th Cavalry had arrived at Wounded Knee Creek from New Mexico in early December 1890. Along the north bank of the White River, near the mouth of Little Grass Creek, the 6th engaged Brulé Sioux attempting to flee to the Badlands on January 1, 1891. Five members of the 6th were awarded the Congressional Medal of Honor for this action.

== Spanish–American War and the Battle of San Juan Hill (1898) ==
On June 14, 1898, Paddock and the 6th Cavalry departed Florida for Cuba and the Spanish–American War. There he was recognized for gallantry during the Battle of San Juan Hill in the Santiago Campaign. While in Cuba, Paddock contracted malaria, and was on sick leave by September 1898. Despite a favorable diagnosis, Paddock was on frequent medical leave or under medical care throughout 1899 while stationed at Fort Leavenworth.

== China Relief Expedition (1900–01) and the death of Capt. Paddock ==
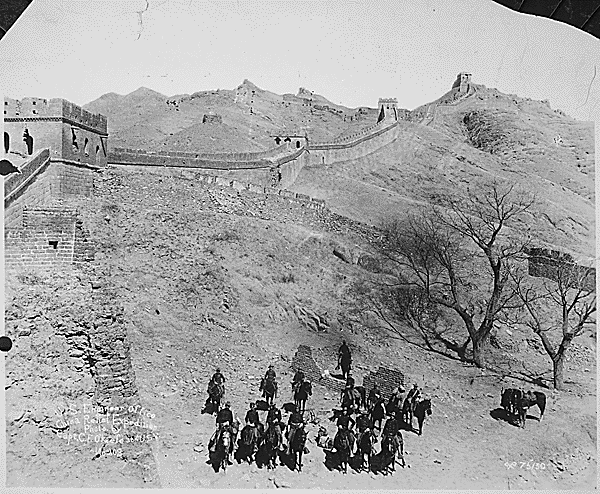
6th Cavalry in China near the Great Wall

Originally ordered to Manila to participate in the Philippine American War, the 6th Cavalry and Capt. Paddock were re-routed to China to join a multinational force protecting international interests during the Boxer Rebellion. On August 28, 1900, during an excursion to gain control of rice granaries just south of the center of Peking, the Paddock-led Troop K engaged over 200 Boxers of the Righteous Harmony Society guarding the rice. Thirty-two Boxers were killed with no American casualties, resulting in high praise for Paddock from 6th Cavalry commander Capt. William Forsyth. Paddock was also involved in combat near Tientsin and Hsuch Chuang Tze.

Still not fully recovered from attacks of malaria contracted in Cuba, Paddock developed severe pneumonia during strenuous march from Peking to Tientsin. He was hospitalized in serious condition March 2 and died in Tientsin on March 9, 1901. Troops from several nations attended a memorial service for Paddock on March 11. His remains were returned to Princeton, Illinois for a funeral and interment at Oakland Cemetery.

From Manila, John Pershing wrote to Paddock's hometown newspaper, "Dick died the soldier that he lived, so brave, so honorable. He was the truest friend I ever had, and his two children and you may always be proud of his unspotted record. Always at his post, always with his regiment fighting. Gallant to the point of recklessness, he escaped bullets to fall a victim to the rigors of campaigning in the dead of winter in the frozen north. A hero at once and always your hero, my hero, a hero to all who knew him."

Paddock was mourned by retired Brig. Gen. Thomas J. Henderson, "I have watched all his successes and promotions and it has been a source of great gratification and pride to me that, although not a graduate of West Point, he was by his intelligence and his soldierly qualities and bearing made those who were, respect and honor him and has won an honorable name for himself."

== Family ==
Richard B. Paddock Jr.

Grace Pershing Paddock became very ill in 1903, bedridden with rheumatism. An act of Congress in 1904 increased her widow pension from $20 per month $30 per month. She died April 25, 1904, in Chicago. The couple's two children May and Richard Jr. were first under the guardianship of Capt. John J. Pershing in Washington, D.C. However, with Capt. Pershing's pending assignment to observe the Russo-Japanese War, Pershing's father John F. Pershing assumed guardianship of the children in Chicago, August 18, 1905. Richard Paddock, Jr. and May Paddock spent considerable time under John J. and Helen "Frankie" Pershing's care during Pershing's command of American forces in the Philippines.

- Stephen G. Paddock, (1828–1921), father: County Clerk, Bureau County, Illinois
- Margaret (Seaman) Paddock (1826–1912), mother.
- Grace Pershing Paddock (d.1904), wife: sister to John Pershing
- Richard Bolles Paddock, Jr. (1891–1952), son: West Point Graduate (1914), U.S. Artillery and U.S. Signal Corps. Participated in Mexican Punitive Expedition (1917), injured in France while on General Pershing's staff (1918). Army career ended at the rank of major after inappropriate relationships with another officer's wife.
- May Paddock Tipton (1892–1918), daughter.

Richard Paddock had several relatives that served in the US Army:

- Solomon A. Paddock (1823–1862), uncle: Lt. Col. in the 9th Illinois Volunteer Cavalry, died en route to St. Louis
- Charles B. Paddock (c. 1842-1863), uncle: Sergeant, 9th Illinois Volunteer Cavalry, died while captive at Camp Florence in South Carolina
- George Laban Paddock (1832–1910), uncle: Lt. 12th Illinois Volunteer Infantry and Major 11th United States Colored Infantry.
- James Valentine Seaman Paddock (1856–1907), brother: West Point Graduate (1877), 5th US Cavalry. Severely injured and well-renowned for his service at the Battle of Milk Creek (1879). Honorably discharged after a court martial conviction was overturned in 1891.
- George Hussey Paddock (1852–1935), cousin: West Point Graduate (1873), 4th US Artillery, Alaska (1874), 5th US Cavalry, 10th US Cavalry. Participated in Nez Peree Campaign, battle of Clearwater, Idaho (1877), Spanish–American War—Puerto Rico Campaign (1898), Philippine American War (1902). Commander Forts Huachuca, Apache and Wingate prior to honorable discharge, 1906, as a lieutenant colonel due to disability contracted in the line of duty. Recalled 1917 as recruiting officer; retired as colonel 1919.
- John J. Pershing (1860–1948), brother-in-law: General of the Armies (1919).
- Ward Pershing (1874–1909), brother-in-law: Lt., 6th US Artillery and 4th US Cavalry. Participated in Philippine American War (1901). Discharged as captain, died from illness contracted in line of duty.

== Summary of Service ==
=== Awards ===
- Indian Campaign Medal
- Spanish Campaign Medal
- China Relief Expedition Medal

=== Dates of rank ===
No Insignia in 1883	Second Lieutenant, United States Army: October 1883
	First Lieutenant, United States Army: July 1891
	Captain, U.S. Army: July 1899

=== Regimental History ===
13th Infantry Regiment, United States Army	October 1883
6th Cavalry Regiment, United States Army	February 1885
