= Murray Thurston Titus =

American missionary and author

Murray Thurston Titus (1885 – October 31, 1964) was an American missionary in India especially known for encouraging understanding between Christians and Muslims.

== Life ==
Born in Batavia, Ohio, Titus joined the Methodist Church in his childhood. He married Olive Glasgow (1884–1967) in July 1910, and together they sailed to India in August that year. They went to the United Provinces, India (now Uttar Pradesh, India) where Titus's first appointment was teaching English, history and philosophy at Reid Christian College, Lucknow. Titus was ordained in 1913, whereupon he was appointed to the Methodist Episcopal Church of North India to do evangelical work in villages in several districts of the United Provinces and in Lahore (Punjab). In 1916 he was made a district superintendent in the North India Conference. In 1941, Titus was appointed principal of Reid Christian College and returned to Lucknow.

Titus and his wife returned to the United States in 1951, whereupon Titus took the position of professor of comparative religion at a seminary in Westminster, Maryland. Titus died on October 31, 1964, in Elyria, Ohio.

== Islamic studies ==
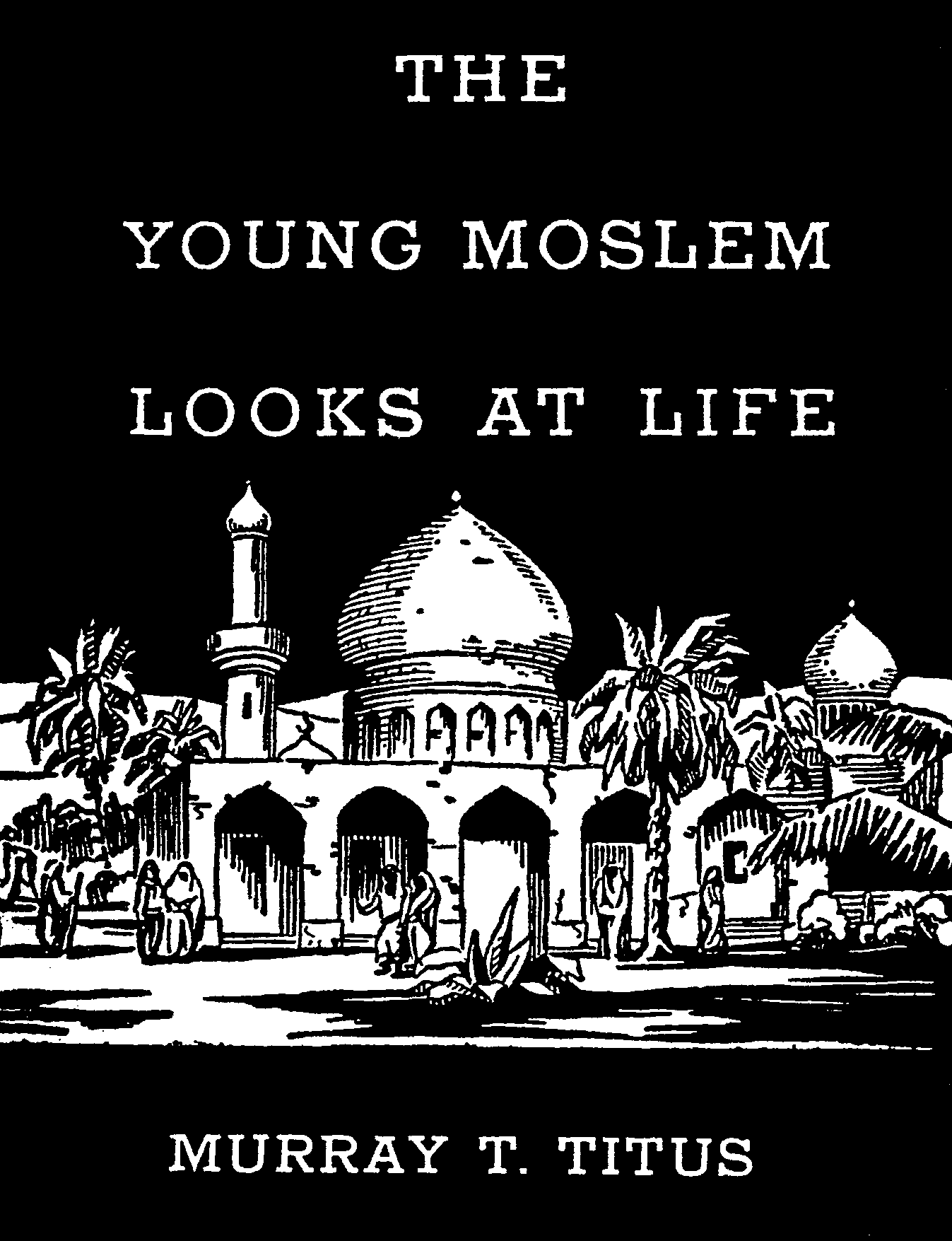
Front page of The Young Moslem Looks at Life.

In 1911, Titus met Samuel Zwemer, an American missionary and Islamicist. After that he began to study Islam, and believing there to be an emerging challenge to Christianity from Islam, worked to encourage mutual understanding between Christians and Muslims by telling missionaries and Indian Christians to read as much as possible about Islam. He was also the co-founder of Henry Martyn School for Islamic Studies in Lahore (which has now moved to Hyderabad). In 1932 and 1933 he was convener of the Committee on Work among Moslems of the National Christian Council of India, Burma and Ceylon, later taking the position of Honorary Secretary and Executive Secretary in that council. In 1935 he was one of the council's representatives at the meeting of the International Missionary Council at Northfield, Massachusetts.

Titus was an associate editor of and frequent contributor to The Moslem World. He was co-editor of the Religious Quest of India series, to which he contributed Indian Islam, a volume published in 1930 by the Oxford University Press. He published The Young Moslem Looks at Life in 1937, which is an essay directed at Christian youths describing various aspects of Islam and the modern world.

== Works ==
- 1930, Indian Islam: A Religious History of Islam in India
- 1934, The Young Moslem Looks at Life
- 1959, Islam in India and Pakistan
