= Cincinnati, Georgetown and Portsmouth Railroad =

Interurban railway in Ohio, U.S.

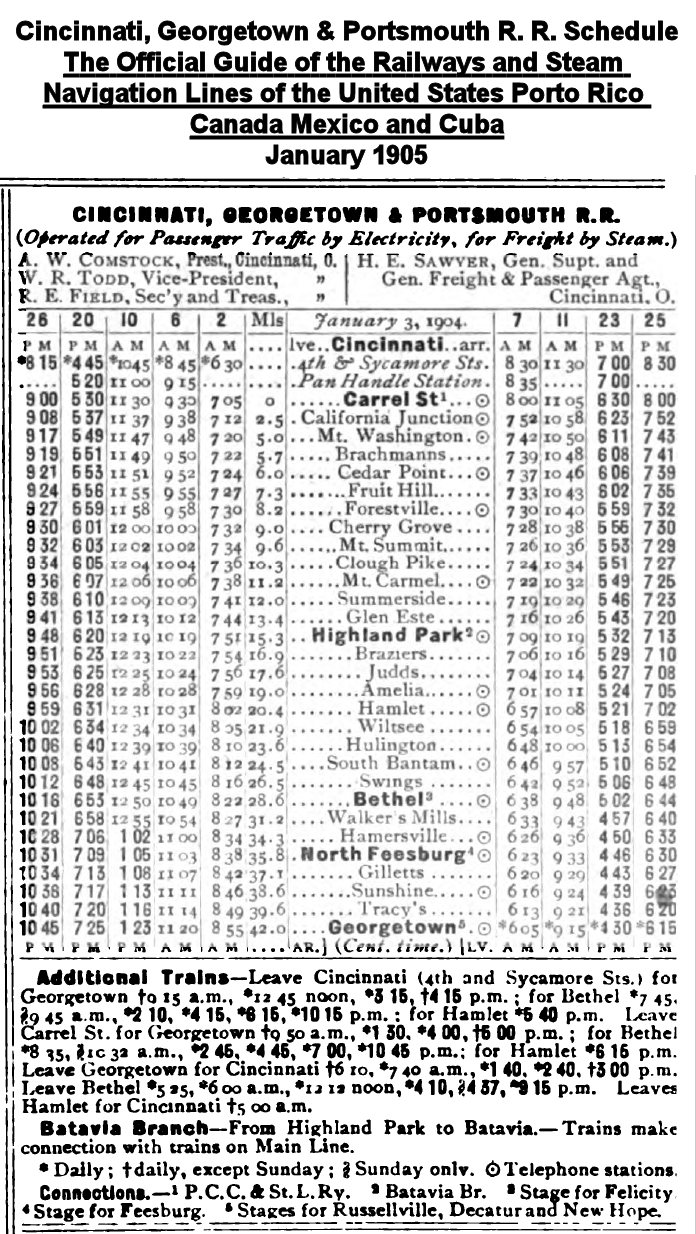

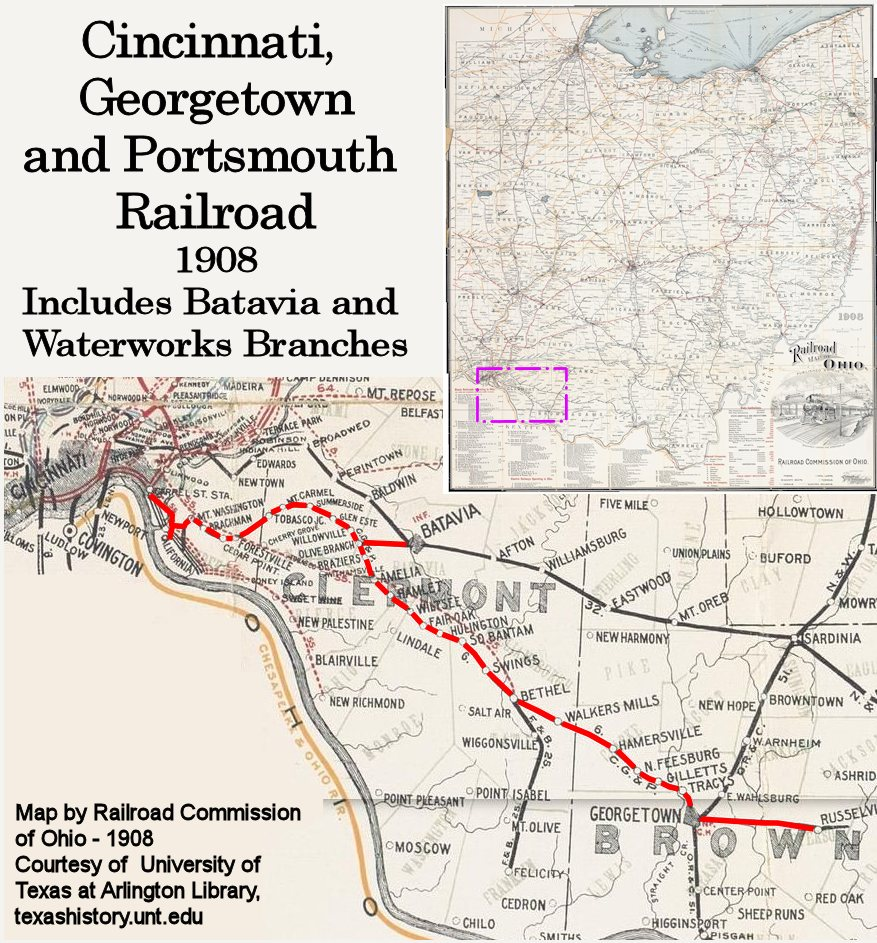
The route of the Cincinnati, Georgetown and Portsmouth Railroad

The Cincinnati, Georgetown and Portsmouth Railroad (CG&P RR) was an interurban railway serving communities in southwestern Ohio. Originally called the Cincinnati and Portsmouth, it was initially organized by Henry Brachmann in 1873.
