= Benjamin A. Poore =

United States Army officer (1863–1940)

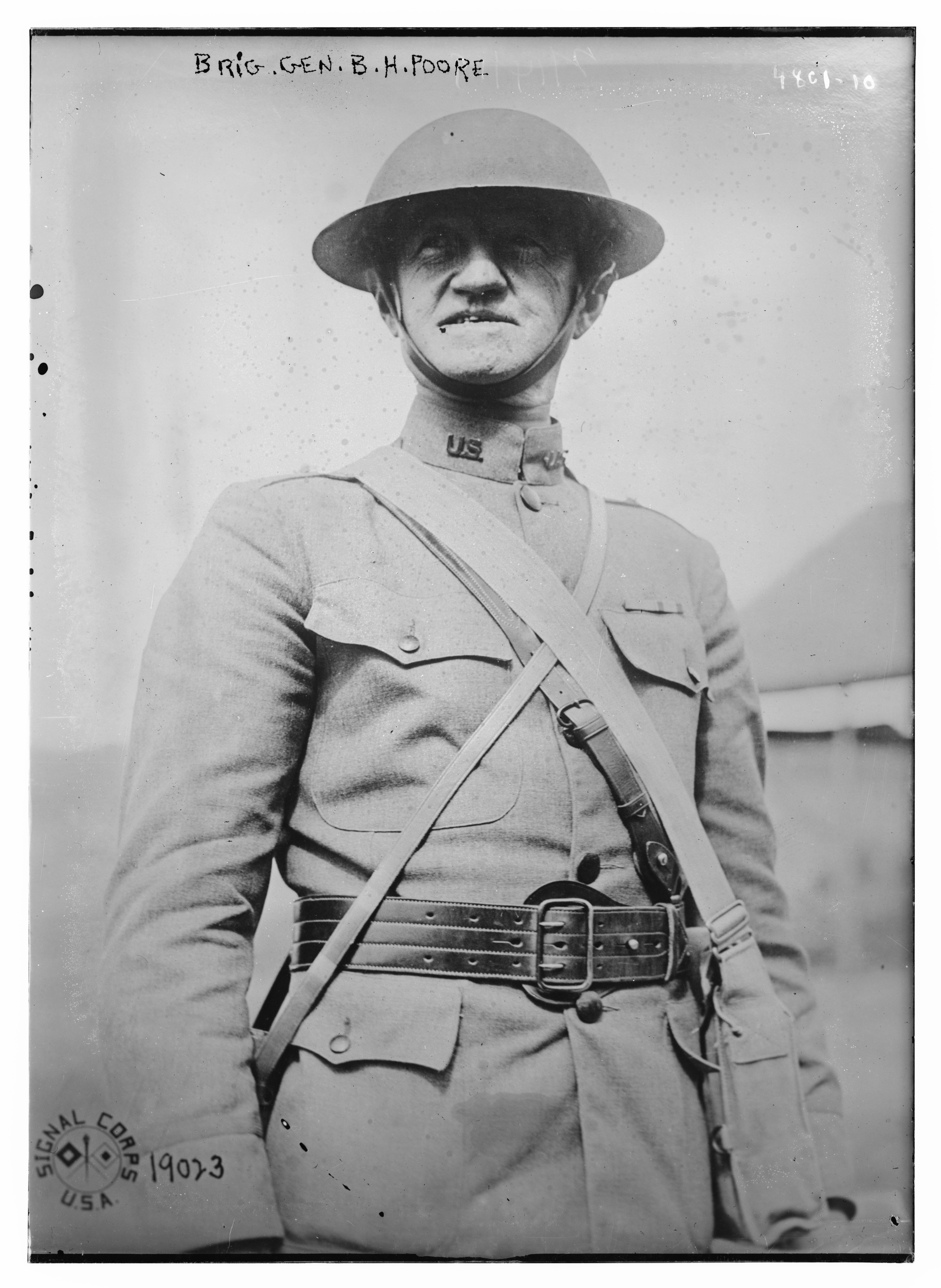
- Poore in 1918
- Born: June 22, 1863; Centre, Alabama, U.S.
- Died: August 21, 1940 (aged 77); Fitchburg, Massachusetts, U.S.
- Burial place: Arlington National Cemetery
- Education: United States Military Academy; United States Army Command and General Staff College; United States Army War College
- Spouse(s): Adelaide Carleton (m. 1888) Flora B. Bullock (m. 1930)
- Children: 3
- Relatives: Joseph Mauborgne (son in law); Charles L. Bolte (son in law)
- Military career
- Service: United States Army
- Service years: 1886–1927
- Rank: Major General
- Service number: 0-160
- Commands: Company I, 6th Infantry; 1st Battalion, 22nd Infantry; 8th Infantry; 162d Depot Brigade; 14th Infantry Brigade; 7th Infantry Brigade, 4th Division; 1st Infantry; 4th Infantry Brigade; 12th Infantry Brigade; Seventh Corps Area
- Wars: Spanish–American War; Philippine–American War; World War I Occupation of the Rhineland
- Awards: Distinguished Service Cross; Army Distinguished Service Medal; Silver Star with oak leaf cluster Legion of Honor (Officer) (France); Croix de guerre with palm (France); War Cross of Military Valor (Italy)

Benjamin A. Poore (June 22, 1863 – August 21, 1940) was a career officer in the United States Army who attained the rank of major general. An 1886 graduate of the United States Military Academy, he was a veteran of the Spanish–American War, Philippine–American War, World War I, and Occupation of the Rhineland, and commanded several Infantry brigades as well as the 4th Division and Seventh Corps Area. Poore's awards included the Distinguished Service Cross, Army Distinguished Service Medal, and two awards of the Silver Star, as well as several foreign decorations.

A native of Centre, Alabama, Poore was raised and educated in Fitchburg, Massachusetts. He attended the United States Military Academy (West Point) beginning in 1882, and in 1886 received his commission as a second lieutenant in the Infantry Branch. Poore served in command and staff assignments during the Spanish–American War and Philippine–American War. During World War I and the post-war Occupation of the Rhineland, Poore was a temporary brigadier general and commanded the 7th Infantry Brigade and acted as commander of the 4th Division.

After the war, Poore returned to his permanent rank of colonel and commanded the 1st Infantry. He was promoted to permanent brigadier general in 1921 and commanded first the 4th Infantry Brigade, then the 12th Infantry Brigade. He received promotion to major general in 1925, and commanded the Seventh Corps Area until retiring in 1927. Poore died in Fitchburg on August 21, 1940, and was buried at Arlington National Cemetery.

== Early life and education ==
Benjamin Andrew Poore was born in Centre, Alabama on June 22, 1863, the son of Andrew Poore and Keziah (Brooks) Shropshire Poore. Andrew Poore was a veteran of the War of 1812 and was nearly 70 years old when Benjamin Poore was born. Keziah Poore was Andrew Poore's second wife, and she died in 1864. After her death, Andrew Poore returned to his native Massachusetts with Benjamin Poore and his siblings. Following Andrew Poore's 1872 death, Benjamin Poore was raised by his half-brother Charles C. Poore, one of Andrew Poore's children with his first wife, who was over 30 years older. Benjamin Poore was educated in the public schools of Fitchburg and graduated from Fitchburg High School in 1879.

After graduating from high school, Poore worked for two years as an apprentice machinist. In 1882, Poore was appointed to the United States Military Academy (West Point) by U.S. Representative Amasa Norcross. He graduated in 1886 ranked 33 of 77, and among his classmates were several individuals who attained general officer rank during the First World War, including John J. Pershing. At graduation, Poore received his commission as a second lieutenant of Infantry.

== Early career ==
After receiving his commission, Poore was assigned to the 12th Infantry, with which he served at Madison Barracks, New York and Fort Sully, South Dakota. From 1891 to 1893, he attended the Infantry and Cavalry School (now the United States Army Command and General Staff College) at Fort Leavenworth, Kansas. He was promoted to first lieutenant in the 10th Infantry in September 1892, and transferred to the 6th Infantry later that month.

From 1893 to 1895, Poore served on the West Point faculty as professor of modern languages. From 1895 to 1898, he served with the 6th Infantry at Fort Thomas, Kentucky. During the Spanish–American War, Poore served with the Bureau of Military Information. He subsequently served in Puerto Rico as commissary officer of the brigade commanded by Theodore Schwan, followed by assignment as adjutant of Schwan's brigade and the Western District of Puerto Rico. While in Puerto Rico, he took part in the July 1898 Battle of Guanica and August 1898 Battle of Hormigueros. After the war, Poore served with the 6th Infantry, first at Fort Thomas, and later at Fort Sam Houston, Texas, including postings as regimental quartermaster and regimental adjutant. He was promoted to captain in March 1899.

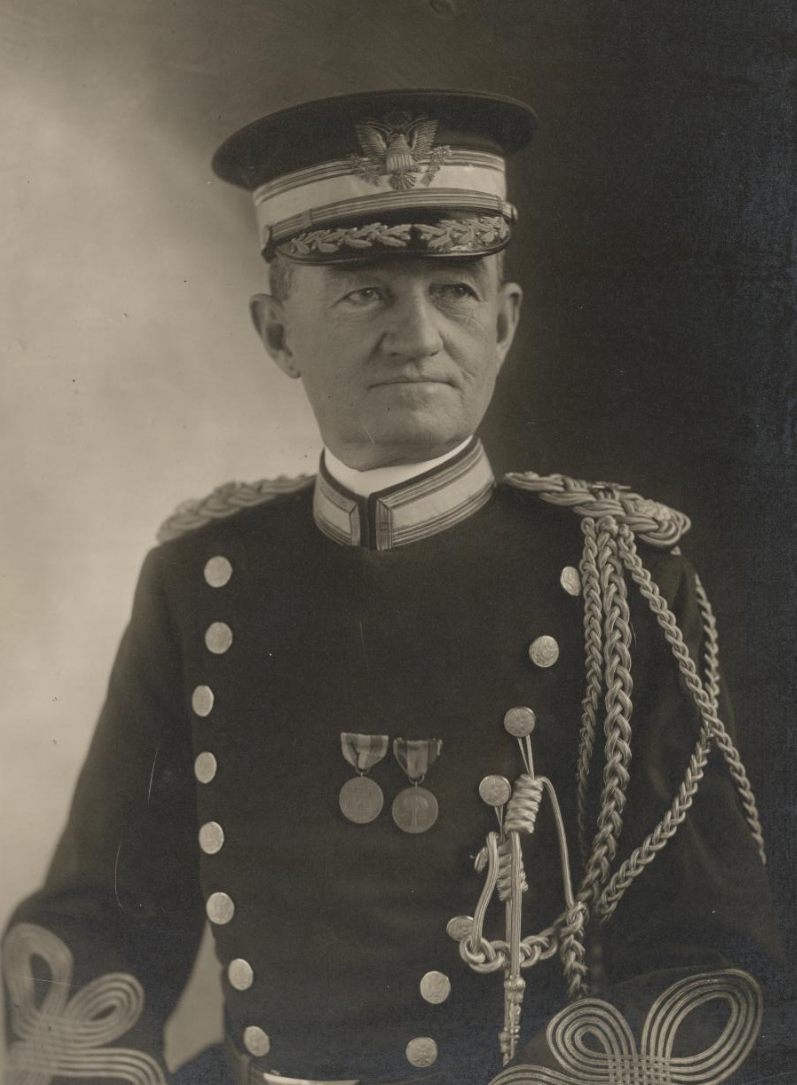
Poore in full dress uniform, 1914

From May 1899 to June 1902, Poore served with his regiment in the Philippines during the Philippine–American War and commanded a detachment in combat during the Battle of Guintabuan on the island of Negros, which resulted in a recommendation for promotion to brevet major. From July 1902 to February 1905, Poore served as commander of Company I, 6th Infantry at Fort Leavenworth. From April 1905 to November 1906, he served in the Philippines for the second time. From 1906 to 1908, he served with his regiment at Fort Missoula, and in October 1908 he was promoted to major in the 22nd Infantry. He then attended the United States Army War College, from which he graduated in September 1909.

From September 1909 to June 1912, Poore served at Fort William H. Seward, Alaska and Fort Sam Houston as commander of 1st Battalion, 22nd Infantry. He was then assigned to the War Department General Staff, where he served until January 1916. He was promoted to lieutenant colonel in August 1914. From January to October 1916, Poore served with the 15th Infantry in Tianjin, China. Poore was promoted to colonel in July 1916, and in November 1916 he took up his new duties as commander of the 8th Infantry at Fort William McKinley, Philippines.

== Later career ==
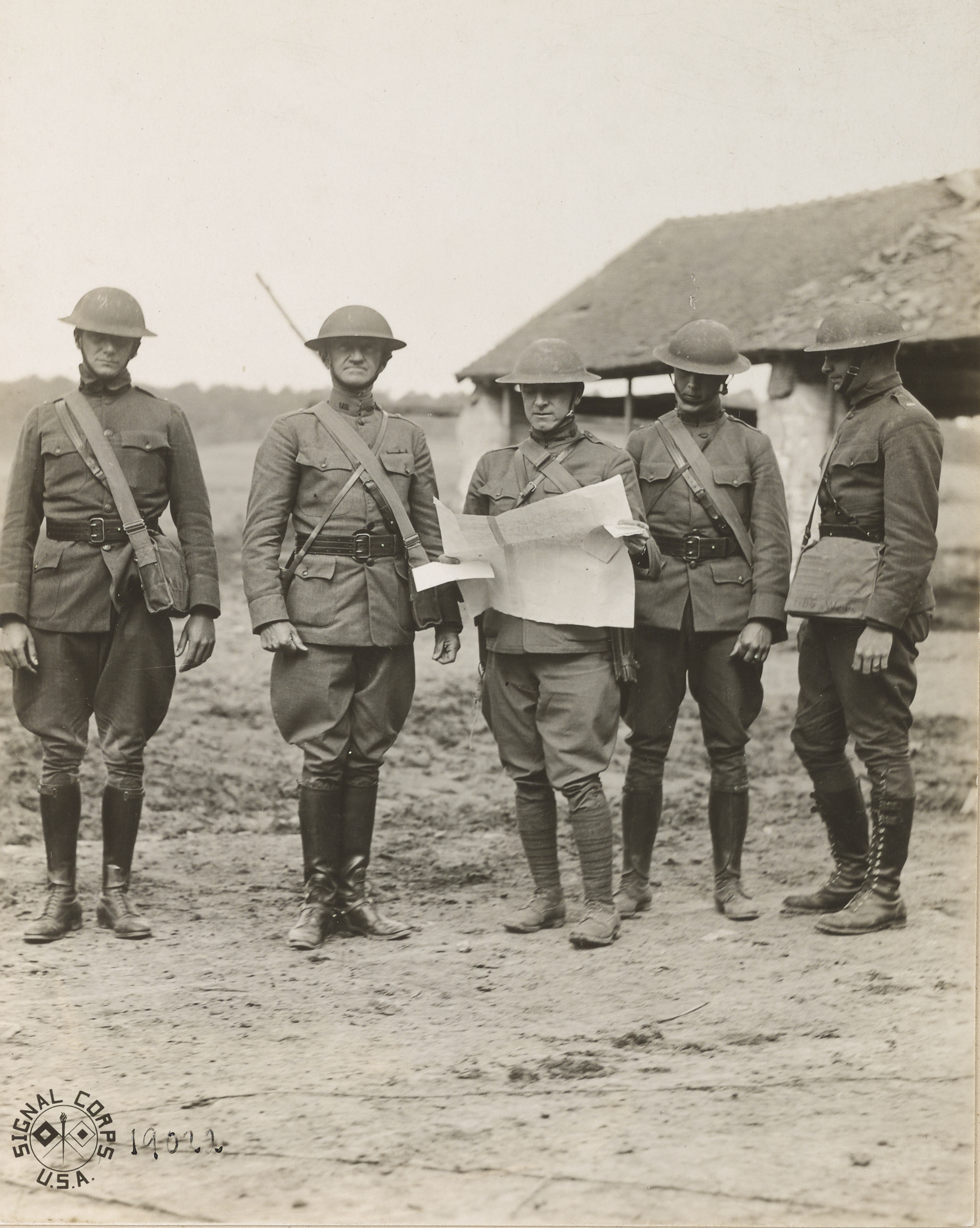
Poore, commanding the 7th Infantry Brigade, 4th Division, with his staff at Chéry-Chartreuve, France, in 1918

With the army now undergoing an unprecedented expansion as the result of the American entry into World War I in April 1917, in August that year, Poore received a temporary promotion (that is, temporary for the duration of the war only) to the rank of brigadier general and was assigned to command the 162d Depot Brigade. This brigade was a training and administrative command for receiving and processing new soldiers as part of the 87th Division at Camp Pike, Arkansas, and as with other First World War depot brigades, it was later established as an independent unit at Camp Pike. In January 1918, Poore was assigned to command the 14th Infantry Brigade, a unit of the 7th Division that was organized and trained at Fort Bliss, Texas.

Beginning in April 1918, Poore commanded the 7th Infantry Brigade, a subordinate command of the 4th Division that completed its organization and training at Camp Greene, North Carolina. He led this command until the end of the war, and acted as commander of the division for two weeks in August 1918 and then again for nine days in October. Poore took part in numerous engagements, including the Second Battle of the Marne and the Meuse–Argonne offensive. After the Armistice of November 11, 1918 ended the war, Poore led his brigade during the occupation of the Rhineland.

After the war, Poore returned to his permanent rank of colonel and commanded the 1st Infantry at Fort Sam Houston. On December 21, 1921, he was promoted to permanent brigadier general and assigned to command the 4th Infantry Brigade, a 2nd Division unit based at Fort Sam Houston. From 1924 to 1925, Poore commanded the 12th Infantry Brigade, a subordinate command of the 6th Division based at Fort D. A. Russell, Wyoming. In October 1925, Poore was promoted to major general and assigned to command Seventh Corps Area at Fort Omaha, Nebraska. He left the army in June 1927, after reaching the mandatory retirement age of 64.

== Awards ==
Poore's awards and decorations included:

- Distinguished Service Cross
- Army Distinguished Service Medal
- Silver Star with oak leaf cluster
- Legion of Honor (Officer) (France)
- Croix de guerre with palm (France)
- War Cross of Military Valor (Italy)

=== Award Citations ===
==== Distinguished Service Cross ====
The Distinguished Service Cross is presented to Benjamin A. Poore, Brigadier General, U.S. Army, for repeated acts of extraordinary heroism in action at Bois-de-Septsarges, France, September 27, and at Bois-du-Fays, France, October 11, 1918. At Bois-de-Septsarges on September 27, General Poore personally reformed his disorganized troops, who were falling back through lack of command and because of severe casualties. Under heavy fire, he led them to the lines, and presented an unbroken front to the enemy. Again on October 11, in the region of Bois-du-Fays, he gathered together troops who were taking refuge from hostile fire, and turned them over to the support commander. Rank: Brigadier General, U.S. Army Unit: 7th Infantry Brigade, 4th Division, A.E.F. Date of Action: September 27 & October 11, 1918 General Orders: No. 44, War Department, April 2, 1919

===== Distinguished Service Medal =====
The President of the United States of America, authorized by Act of Congress, July 9, 1918, takes pleasure in presenting the Army Distinguished Service Medal to Brigadier General Benjamin Andrew Poore, United States Army, for exceptionally meritorious and distinguished services to the Government of the United States, in a duty of great responsibility during World War I. General Poore Commanded with distinction and ability the 7th Infantry Brigade, 4th Division, in the numerous engagements of the Argonne-Meuse campaign. By his energy and ability his brigade drove the enemy from Ruisseu-des-Forges and from Bois-du-Fays. In these engagements important capture of many prisoners and much material were made by the troops of his command. Rank: Brigadier General, U.S. Army Unit: 7th Infantry Brigade, 4th Division, A.E.F. General Orders: No. 59, War Department, 1919

== Later life and death ==
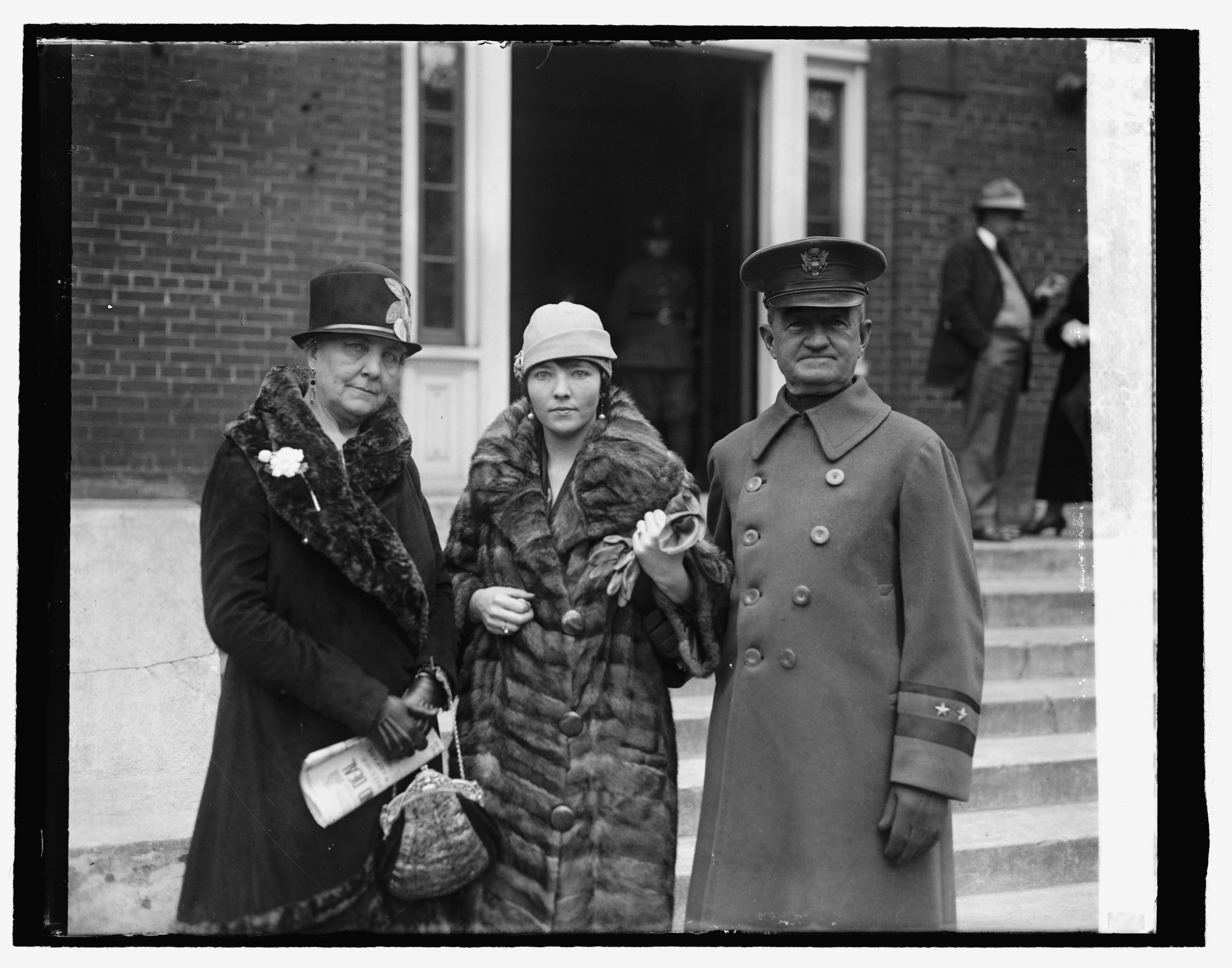
Poore with wife and Adelaide, 1925

In retirement, Poore was a resident of Fitchburg. He maintained an interest in military matters, and was frequently invited to participate in events including reviews and inspections of Citizens' Military Training Camps at Fort Devens, Massachusetts, in addition to reunions and other activities at West Point.

In 1932, he made national headlines when he resigned from The American Legion because of disagreement with its advocacy for immediate payment of a bonus to World War I veterans that was due in 1945.

Poore died in Fitchburg on August 21, 1940, and was buried at Arlington National Cemetery.

== Personal life ==
In 1888, Poore married Adelaide Carleton of Salem, Massachusetts. She died in 1929, and in 1930 he married Flora B. Bullock, the widow of Brigham N. Bullock. With his first wife, Poore was the father of three daughters— Katherine, Priscilla, and Adelaide.

Katherine Poore was the wife of Major General Joseph Mauborgne. Priscilla Poore was the wife of Brigadier General Donald A. Robinson. Adelaide Poore was the wife of General Charles L. Bolte.
