= Percy Moreau Ashburn =

American physician (1872–1940)

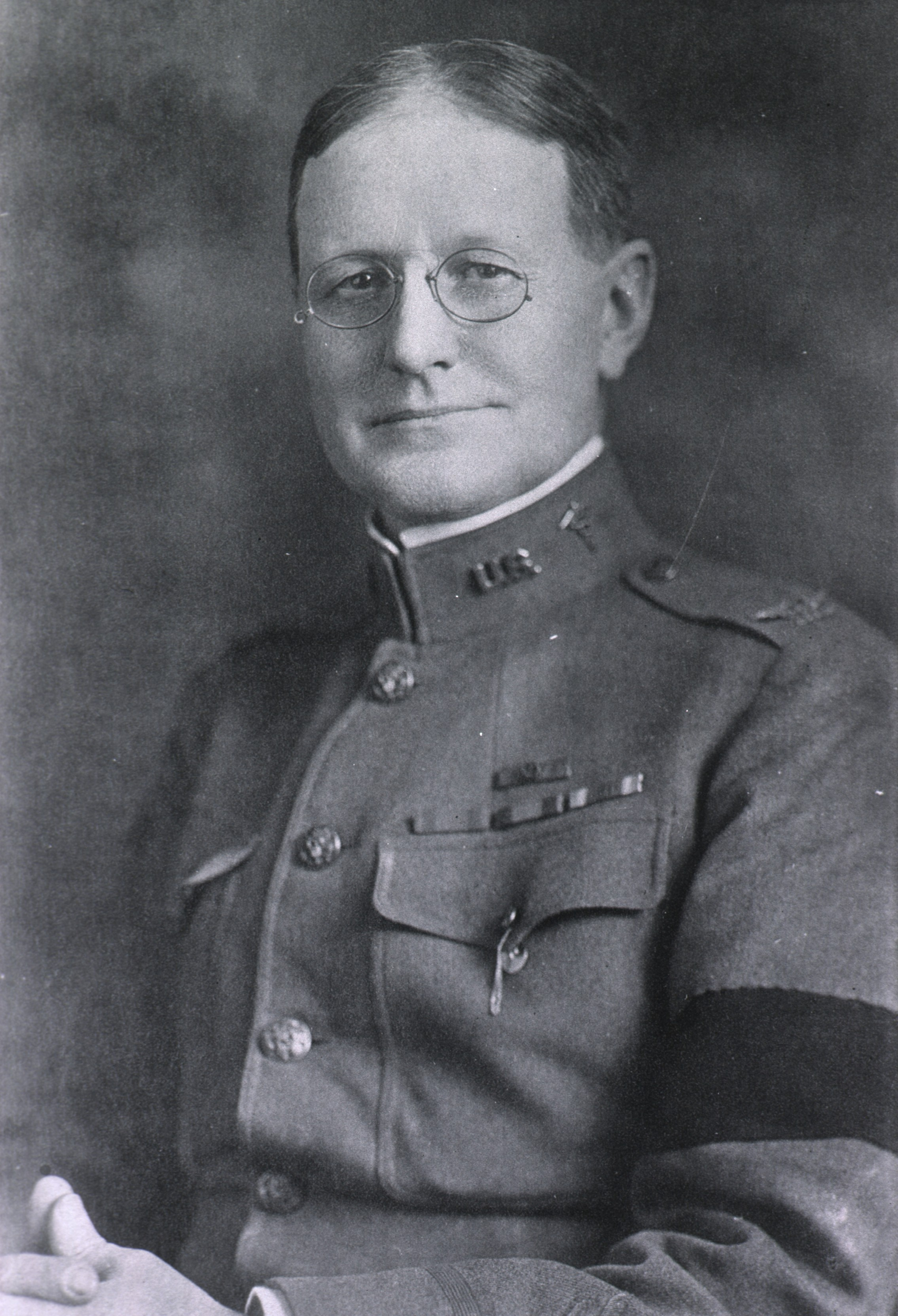
- Colonel Percy M. Ashburn
- Born: July 28, 1872; Batavia, Clermont County, Ohio
- Died: August 20, 1940 (aged 68); Washington, D.C.
- Burial place: Arlington National Cemetery
- Spouse: Agnes Davis
- Military career
- Allegiance: United States
- Branch: United States Army
- Service years: 1898–1932
- Rank: Colonel
- Service number: O-271
- Commands: Walter Reed General Hospital, Washington, D.C. Medical Officers Training Camp, Fort Benjamin Harrison, Indiana Medical Field Service School, Carlisle Barracks, Pennsylvania

Percy Moreau Ashburn (July 28, 1872 – August 20, 1940) was a colonel and medical officer in the United States Army. With then Lieutenant Charles Franklin Craig, Ashburn made the link that mosquitoes were involved in the transmission of Dengue fever. As a major, he served as the sixth commanding officer of the Walter Reed General Hospital, and as a colonel, he served as the first commandant of the Medical Field Service School at Carlisle Barracks, Pennsylvania.

== Early life ==
Ashburn was born on July 28, 1872, to Allen W. Ashburn and Julia M. née Kennedy in Batavia, Ohio.

Ashburn graduated from Batavia High School in 1890. He then attended Jefferson Medical College.

== Personal life ==
Ashburn married Agnes Davis on July 6, 1896. Together they had three children.

Major General Thomas Q. Ashburn was his brother. Brigadier General Julius Penn was his cousin.

== Career ==
Ashburn was appointed a contract surgeon with the United States Army on May 30, 1898. He accepted a Regular Army commission as an assistant surgeon on January 9, 1899, and was promoted to captain in the Medical Corps on December 12, 1903, and major on June 24, 1908. He was effectively promoted directly from major to colonel on May 15, 1917, as his date of rank for lieutenant colonel and colonel were both on the same day. Unlike many other officers who would be offered temporary promotions in the National Army, only to return to their regular rank after the end of the First World War, as a Regular Army colonel Ashburn would hold his rank until he retired in 1932. From 1906 to 1907, Ashburn presided over the Army board for the study of tropical diseases in the Philippines. The board's findings were released as Experimental Investigations Regarding the Etiology of Dengue Fever, with a General Consideration of the Disease with Ashburn and Craig as the co-authors. In 1913, he was detailed to preside over the Army board for the study of tropical diseases in the Philippines and at Ancon, Panama. Afterwards, Ashburn wrote Mosquito-borne Diseases.

He commanded the Walter Reed General Hospital in Washington, D.C., from September 1915 to October 1916.

He commanded the Medical Officers Training Camp at Fort Benjamin Harrison, Indiana in 1917.

Ashburn served as the first Commandant of the Medical Field Service School at Carlisle Barracks, Pennsylvania from August 1, 1920, to August 1, 1923.

Then, Ashburn served as the professor of military hygiene at the United States Military Academy from 1923 to 1927. He then served as the librarian at the Army Medical Library in Washington, D.C., from 1927 to 1932, when he retired.

He authored the following books: The Elements of Military Hygiene (1909), History of the Medical Department of the United States Army (1929), and with his son Frank Davis Ashburn The Ranks of Death, A Medical History of the Conquest of America.

== Awards and honors ==
Ashburn was made an officer in France's Legion of Honour for his services during World War I.

== Death and legacy ==
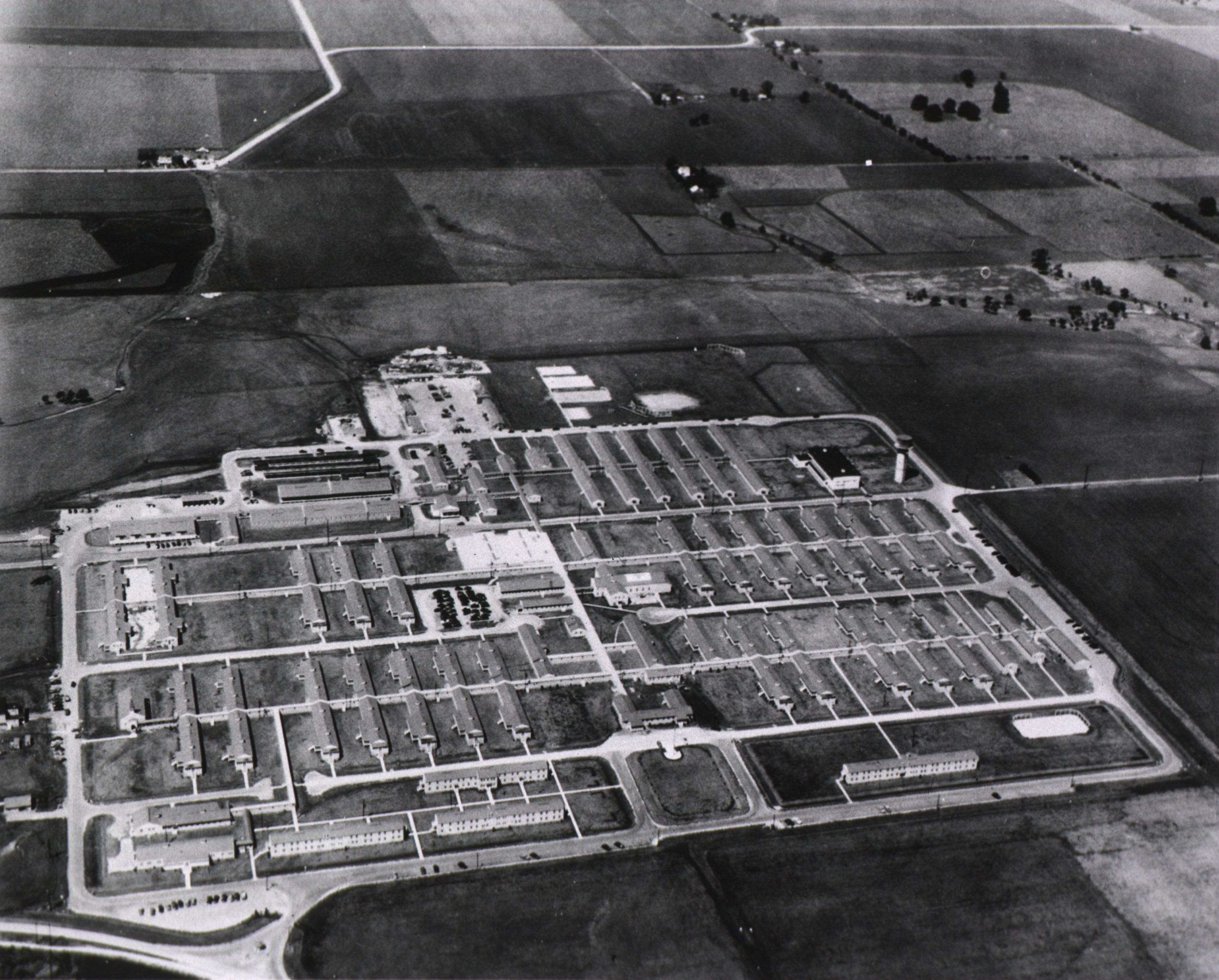
U.S. Army, Ashburn General Hospital, McKinney, Texas: Aerial view, circa 1943

Ashburn died on August 20, 1940. His wife, Dorothy, died on December 14, 1946. They are buried in Section 3, Plot 2075 in Arlington National Cemetery, Virginia.

The Ashburn General Hospital, a 500-bed cantonment hospital in McKinney, Texas which opened on May 1, 1943, was named in his honor. The hospital was declared surplus to the needs of the Army on December 12, 1945, and was taken over by the Veterans Administration on January 15, 1946.

The Ashburn Gate at Carlisle Barracks, Pennsylvania is named in his honor.

His papers are held by the History of Medicine Division of the National Library of Medicine.
