= Thomas of Ashborne =

English theological controversialist

- Occupation: Theological controversialist

Thomas of Ashborne (fl. 1382) was an English theological controversialist.

== Biography ==
Thomas of Ashborne was a native of Ashborne in Derbyshire, and became an Austin friar there. He went to Oxford and took the degree of master in theology. In 1374, at the council of Westminster, he argued against paying tribute to Gregory XI. In 1382, at the council of London, he helped to draft the twenty-four conclusions against Wyclif's doctrines on the sacrament. The titles are given by Bale of many controversial writings not known to be extant.

A contemporary Thomas Asheburne (fl. 1384), poet, was a scholar of Corpus Christi College, Cambridge, where his expenses for one year, 11l. 4s. 1d., were paid by Lord De La Warr to Dr. John Kyme or Kynne, who was master from 1379 to 1389. Subsequently, he became a Carmelite of Northampton, and wrote a long English theological poem formerly in the Cottonian MS. Vitell. f. xiii. 1, which has been burnt. In Cott. App. vii. a version of Richard Rolle's ‘Pricke of Conscience’ is ascribed in a later hand to Asheburne. It is preceded by a short allegorical English poem, beginning "[Lyst you] all gret and smale, I shall yow tell a lytell tale," which may be Asheburne's work (Tanner, Bibl. Brit.; Sir F. Madden's and other notes in Cott. App. vii.; Cambridge Antiq. Soc. Communications, xxxix. 401).
