= Ashburn, Missouri =

- Town
- Location of Ashburn, Missouri
- Coordinates: 39°32′45″N 91°10′19″W
- Country: United States
- State: Missouri
- County: Pike

Area
  - Total: 0.13 sq mi (0.34 km^{2})
  - Land: 0.13 sq mi (0.34 km^{2})
  - Water: 0 sq mi (0.00 km^{2})
- Elevation: 489 ft (149 m)

Population (2020)
  - Total: 33
  - Density: 249.3/sq mi (96.27/km^{2})
- Time zone: UTC-6 (Central (CST))
  - Summer (DST): UTC-5 (CDT)
- ZIP code: 63433
- Area code: 573
- FIPS code: 29-02152
- GNIS feature ID: 2397440

Ashburn is a town in Pike County, Missouri, United States. As of the 2020 census, Ashburn had a population of 33.

== History ==
A post office called Ashburn has been in operation since 1857. The community bears the name of George T. Ashburn (died 1868), an early settler.

== Geography ==
According to the United States Census Bureau, the village has a total area of 0.13 square miles (0.34 km^{2}), all land.

== Demographics ==
Historical population
Census	Pop.	Note	%±
1900	312		—
1910	295		−5.4%
1920	181		−38.6%
1930	281		55.2%
1940	159		−43.4%
1950	153		−3.8%
1960	124		−19.0%
1970	119		−4.0%
1980	89		−25.2%
1990	51		−42.7%
2000	51		0.0%
2010	52		2.0%
2020	33		−36.5%
U.S. Decennial Census

=== 2010 census ===
As of the census of 2010, there were 52 people, 21 households, and 13 families living in the village. The population density was 400.0 inhabitants per square mile (154.4/km^{2}). There were 34 housing units at an average density of 261.5 per square mile (101.0/km^{2}). The racial makeup of the village was 100.0% White.

There were 21 households, of which 28.6% had children under the age of 18 living with them, 38.1% were married couples living together, 9.5% had a female householder with no husband present, 14.3% had a male householder with no wife present, and 38.1% were non-families. 23.8% of all households were made up of individuals, and 14.3% had someone living alone who was 65 years of age or older. The average household size was 2.48 and the average family size was 2.85.

The median age in the village was 52.3 years. 23.1% of residents were under the age of 18; 3.8% were between the ages of 18 and 24; 15.4% were from 25 to 44; 34.6% were from 45 to 64; and 23.1% were 65 years of age or older. The gender makeup of the village was 53.8% male and 46.2% female.

=== 2000 census ===
As of the census of 2000, there were 51 people, 23 households, and 14 families living in the town. The population density was 385.2 inhabitants per square mile (148.7/km^{2}). There were 32 housing units at an average density of 241.7 per square mile (93.3/km^{2}). The racial makeup of the town was 100.00% White.

There were 23 households, out of which 17.4% had children under the age of 18 living with them, 47.8% were married couples living together, 8.7% had a female householder with no husband present, and 39.1% were non-families. 21.7% of all households were made up of individuals, and 13.0% had someone living alone who was 65 years of age or older. The average household size was 2.22 and the average family size was 2.71.

In the town the population was spread out, with 13.7% under the age of 18, 5.9% from 18 to 24, 25.5% from 25 to 44, 35.3% from 45 to 64, and 19.6% who were 65 years of age or older. The median age was 49 years. For every 100 females, there were 88.9 males. For every 100 females age 18 and over, there were 100.0 males.

The median income for a household in the town was $11,797, and the median income for a family was $11,797. Males had a median income of $0 versus $0 for females. The per capita income for the town was $7,569. There were 69.6% of families and 72.2% of the population living below the poverty line, including 100.0% of under eighteens and none of those over 64.
