= National Register of Historic Places listings in Colquitt County, Georgia =

This is a list of properties and districts in Colquitt County, Georgia that are listed on the National Register of Historic Places (NRHP).

This National Park Service list is complete through NPS recent listings posted May 1, 2026.

== Current listings ==
	Name on the Register	Image	Date listed	Location	City or town	Description
1	W. W. Ashburn House		July 15, 1982 (#82002396)	609 1st Ave. 31°10′43″N 83°47′45″W	Moultrie	Is visible in bird's-eye view but gone in satellite view; this house was moved to Brooks County, GA, in pieces sometime in late 2012 or early 2013, exact location unknown
2	Carnegie Library of Moultrie	Carnegie Library of Moultrie	July 15, 1982 (#82002397)	39 N. Main St. 31°10′50″N 83°47′21″W	Moultrie	
3	James W. Coleman House	James W. Coleman House	December 22, 1983 (#83003555)	GA 33; 31°13′28″N 83°47′49″W	Moultrie	
4	Colquitt County Courthouse	Colquitt County Courthouse	September 18, 1980 (#80001003)	Courthouse Sq. 31°10′45″N 83°47′18″W	Moultrie	
5	Colquitt County Jail	Colquitt County Jail	October 10, 1980 (#80001004)	126 1st Ave., SE; 31°10′42″N 83°47′12″W	Moultrie	
6	Mother Easter Baptist Church and Parsonage	Mother Easter Baptist Church and Parsonage	April 1, 1999 (#99000413)	400 Second Ave., NW; 31°10′55″N 83°47′37″W	Moultrie	
7	Moultrie Commercial Historic District	Moultrie Commercial Historic District	June 3, 1994 (#94000543)	Roughly bounded by NE. First Ave., SE. Second Ave., W. First St. and E. Fourth St. 31°10′48″N 83°47′14″W	Moultrie	Colquitt Towers - former hotel called Hotel Colquitt
8	Moultrie High School	Moultrie High School	June 17, 1982 (#82002398)	401 7th Ave. SW; 31°10′20″N 83°47′40″W	Moultrie	
9	Henry Crawford Tucker Log House and Farmstead		July 26, 1982 (#82002399)	Off GA 37; 31°12′37″N 83°50′39″W	Moultrie	Moultrie Observer
