= Alligood =

Alligood is a surname. Notable people with the surname include:

- Arthur Alligood (fl. 2005), American folk singer-songwriter
- Bob Alligood (1932–2023), American politician
- Hannah Alligood (born 2003), American actress
