= WMTM =

WMTM may refer to:

- WMTM (AM), a radio station (1300 AM) licensed to Moultrie, Georgia, United States
- WMTM-FM, a radio station (93.9 FM) licensed to Moultrie, Georgia, United States
