= C.A. Gray Jr High School =

Public high school/middle school in Moultrie, Georgia, United States

Location
- 812 11th Ave. NW; Moultrie, Georgia 31768; United States
- Coordinates: 31.1914°N 83.7992°W

Information
- Type: Public high school
- School district: Colquitt County School District
- Principal: Frederick Smith
- Teaching staff: 87.10 (FTE)
- Grades: 8
- Enrollment: 1,424 (2023-2024)
- Student to teacher ratio: 16.35
- Colors: Gold and black
- Athletics: Georgia High School Association / SGAC (South Georgia Athletic Conference)
- Mascot: Packer
- Team name: C.A. Gray Packers
- Website: https://www.colquitt.k12.ga.us/schools/gray/index

C.A. Gray Jr High School (also called Charlie A. Grey, Jr. High School) is a public high school/middle school in Moultrie, Georgia, United States, which was established in 1956. It serves Moultrie and part of Omega.

C.A. Gray is a member of the Georgia High School Association and Region 1-AAAAA and the South Georgia Athletic Conference for athletic competition. The school's mascot is the Packers and its colors are gold and black.

== Athletics ==
The interscholastic sports program at C. A. Gray Jr. High School offers:

- baseball
- basketball
- cheerleading
- cross-country
- diving
- football
- golf
- gymnastics
- marching band
- rifle team
- soccer
- softball
- swimming
- tennis
- track
- wrestling

Any student who wishes to participate in a school sports program must have a physical exam (free of charge during the summer) and is encouraged to purchase the school's insurance.

== Band ==
The band program is an important part of C.A. Gray Jr. High School. The junior high school band contains many auxiliaries for participation and performance, such as district and all-state band.

Band Director:

- Sarah Brown

== Choir ==
The Choral Department at C.A. Gray Jr. High School offers all students an opportunity to participate in a music activity. Students are graded on improvement and not on talent. The choirs perform at various occasions for the public and at choral festivals.

Choral Director:

- E. Miller

== Namesake ==
C.A. Gray Jr High is named takes its name from one of Moultrie's dedicated educators, Miss Charlie A. Gray. She was born in 1902, and received a B.S. Degree in Education from the Tuskegee Institute.
