= Moultrie Commercial Historic District =

Historic district in Georgia, United States

- U.S. National Register of Historic Places
- U.S. Historic district
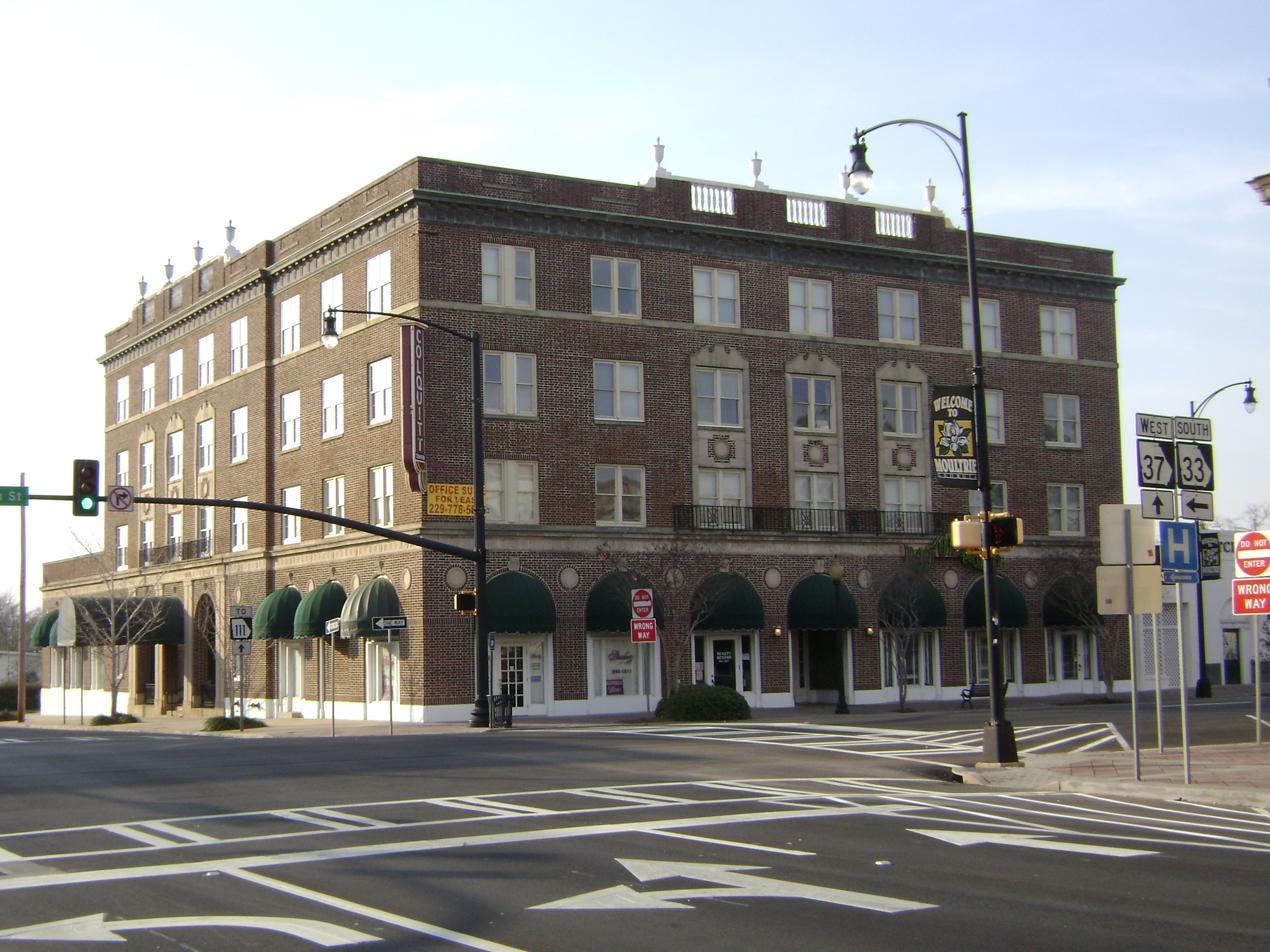
- Colquitt Towers, formerly the Colquitt Hotel

- Location within Georgia Location within the United States
- Location: Roughly bounded by NE. First Ave., SE. Second Ave., W. First St. and E. Fourth St., Moultrie, Georgia
- Coordinates: 31.18°N 83.787222°W
- Area: 48 acres (19 ha)
- Architect: A.J. Bryan and Company, T.F. Lockwood, others
- Architectural style: Art Deco, Late 19th And Early 20th Century American Movements, Late 19th And 20th Century Revivals
- NRHP reference No.: 94000543
- Added to NRHP: June 3, 1994

The Moultrie Commercial Historic District, in Moultrie in Colquitt County, Georgia, is a 48 acres (19 ha) historic district which was listed on the National Register of Historic Places in 1994. The district is roughly bounded by NE. First Ave., SE. Second Ave., W. First St. and E. Fourth St. In 1994, the district included 61 contributing buildings and one contributing object. It also included 17 non-contributing buildings.

The district included three properties which were already separately listed on the National Register:

- Colquitt County Courthouse (1902), listed in 1980, designed by A.J. Bryan and Company
- Colquitt County Jail (1915), listed in 1980
- Carnegie Library of Moultrie (1909), listed in 1982, designed by T.F. Lockwood.

The district includes Colquitt Towers, a former hotel which was called Colquitt Hotel, a four-story Colonial Revival-style building with balustrade and urns on roof and on arched openings.

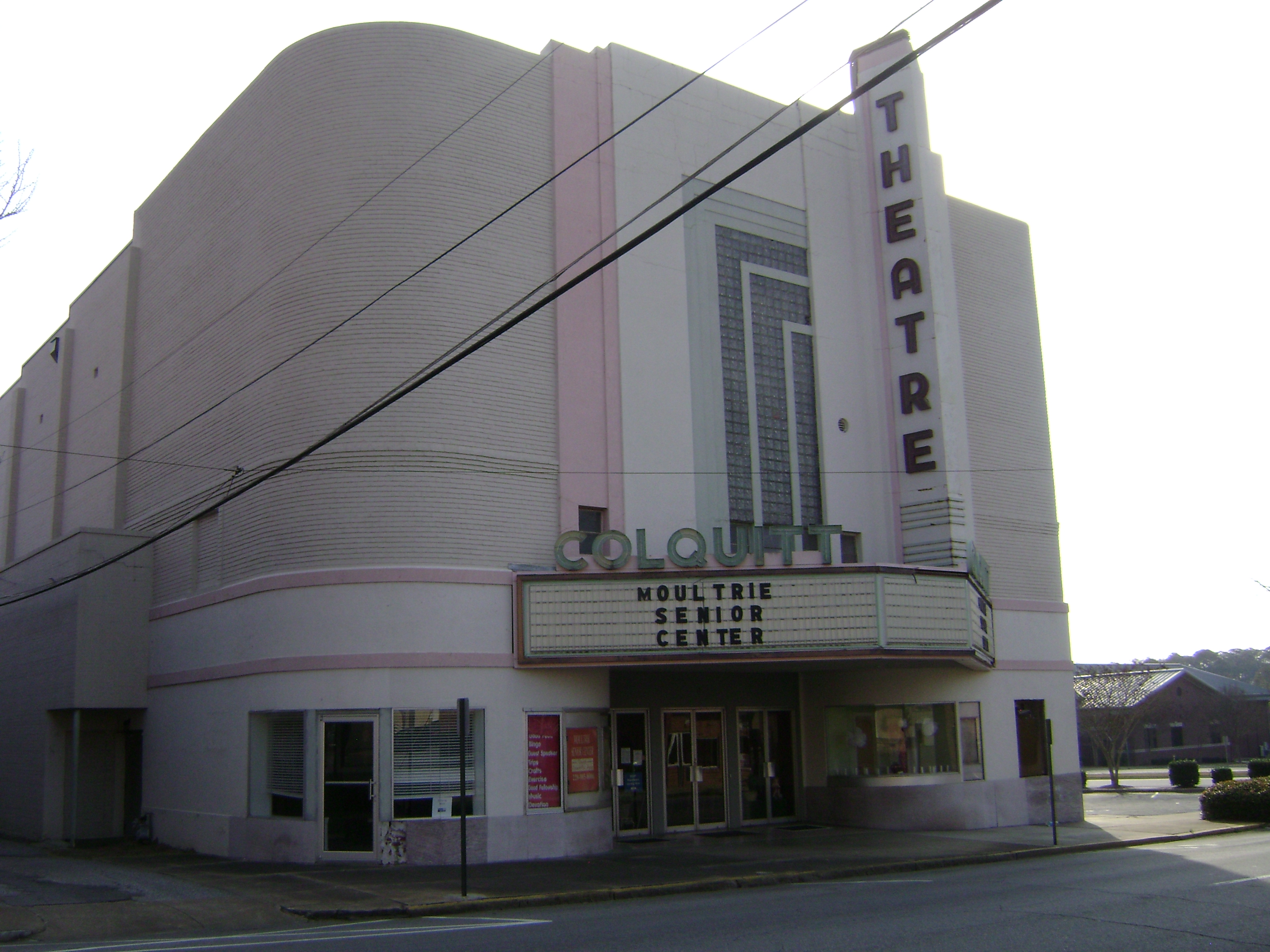
Colquitt Theatre

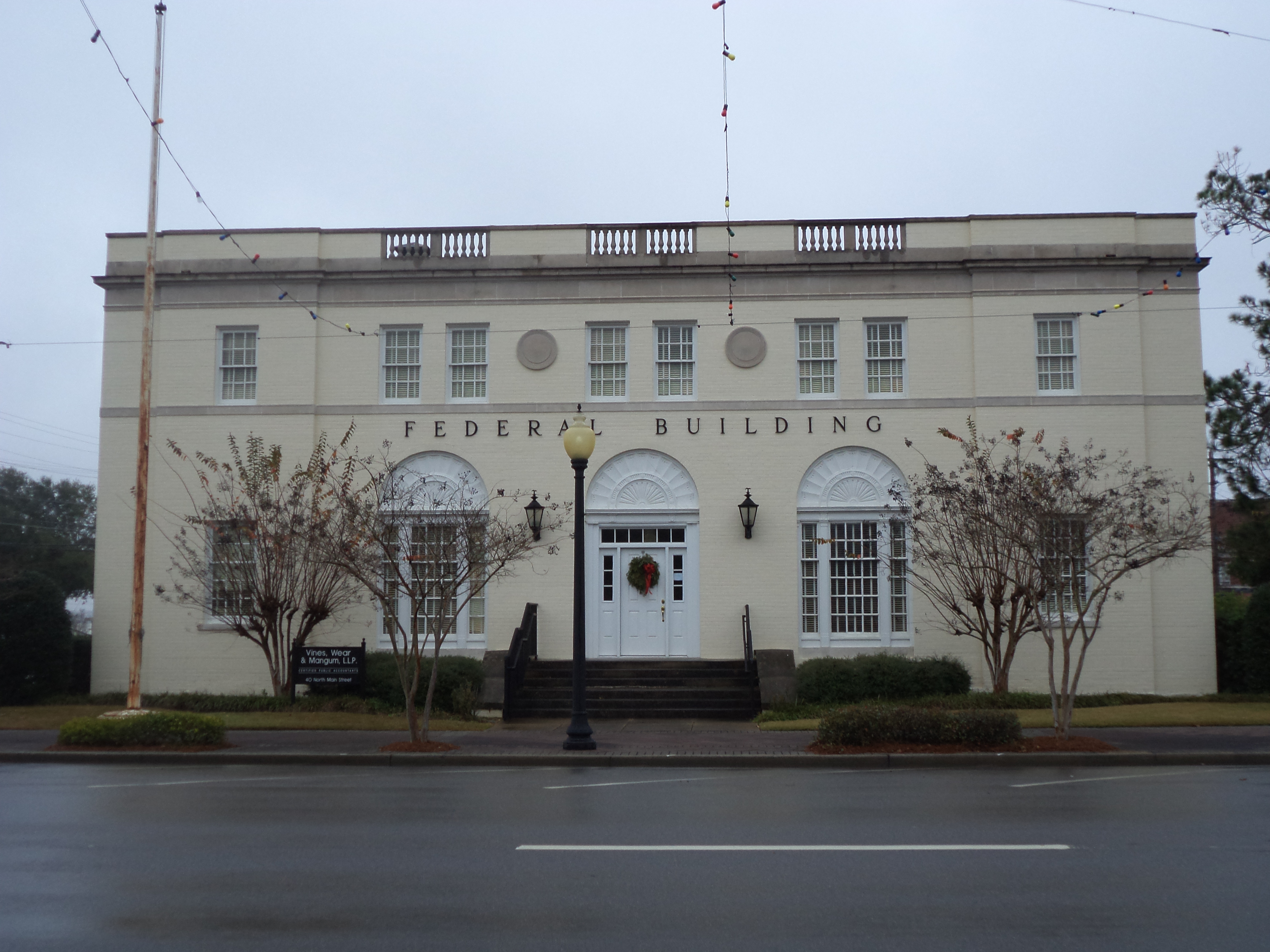
Federal Building

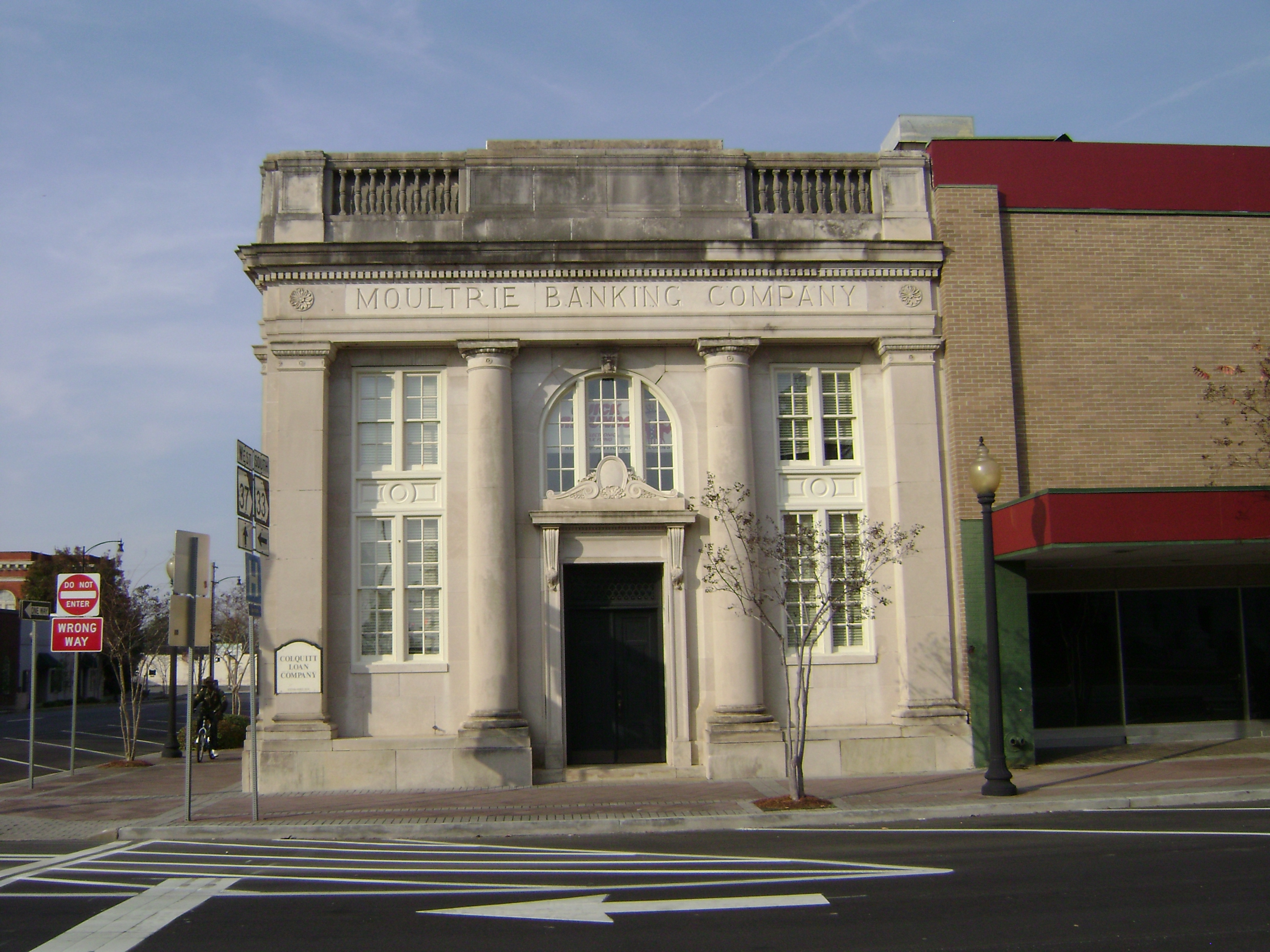
Moultrie Banking Company Building
