= Mother Easter Baptist Church and Parsonage =

- U.S. National Register of Historic Places
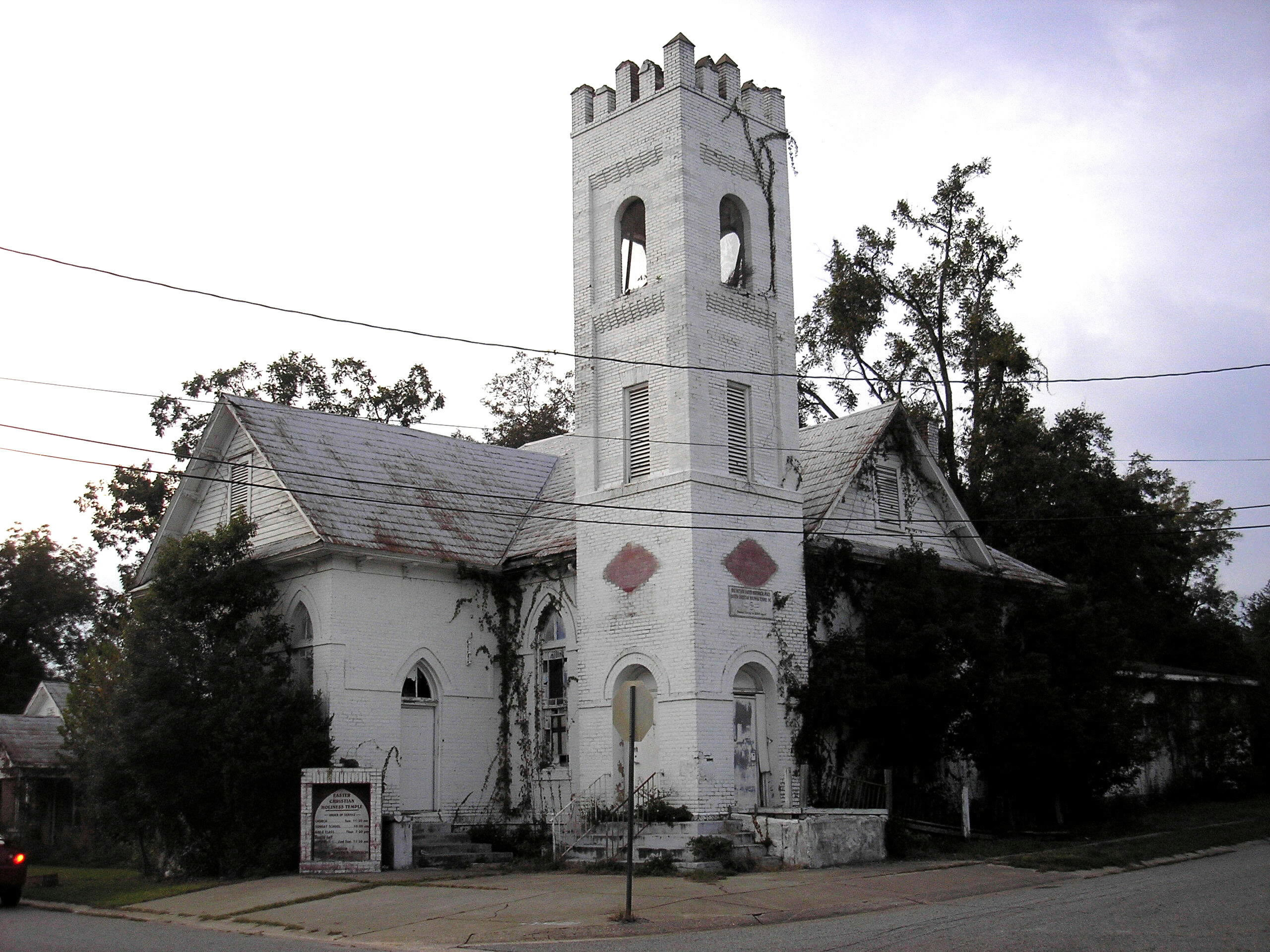

- Location within Georgia
- Location: 400 Second Ave., NW, Moultrie, Georgia
- Coordinates: 31.182°N 83.7937°W
- Area: less than one acre
- Built: 1906, 1941
- Built by: Thomas, W.D.
- Architectural style: Bungalow/craftsman
- NRHP reference No.: 99000413
- Added to NRHP: April 1, 1999

Mother Easter Baptist Church and Parsonage is a historic site in Moultrie, Georgia. It was added to the National Register of Historic Places on April 1, 1999. It is located at 400 Second Avenue NW.

The church was built in 1906 and the parsonage was completed in 1941.

== See also ==
- National Register of Historic Places listings in Colquitt County, Georgia
