= Carnegie Library of Moultrie =

- U.S. National Register of Historic Places
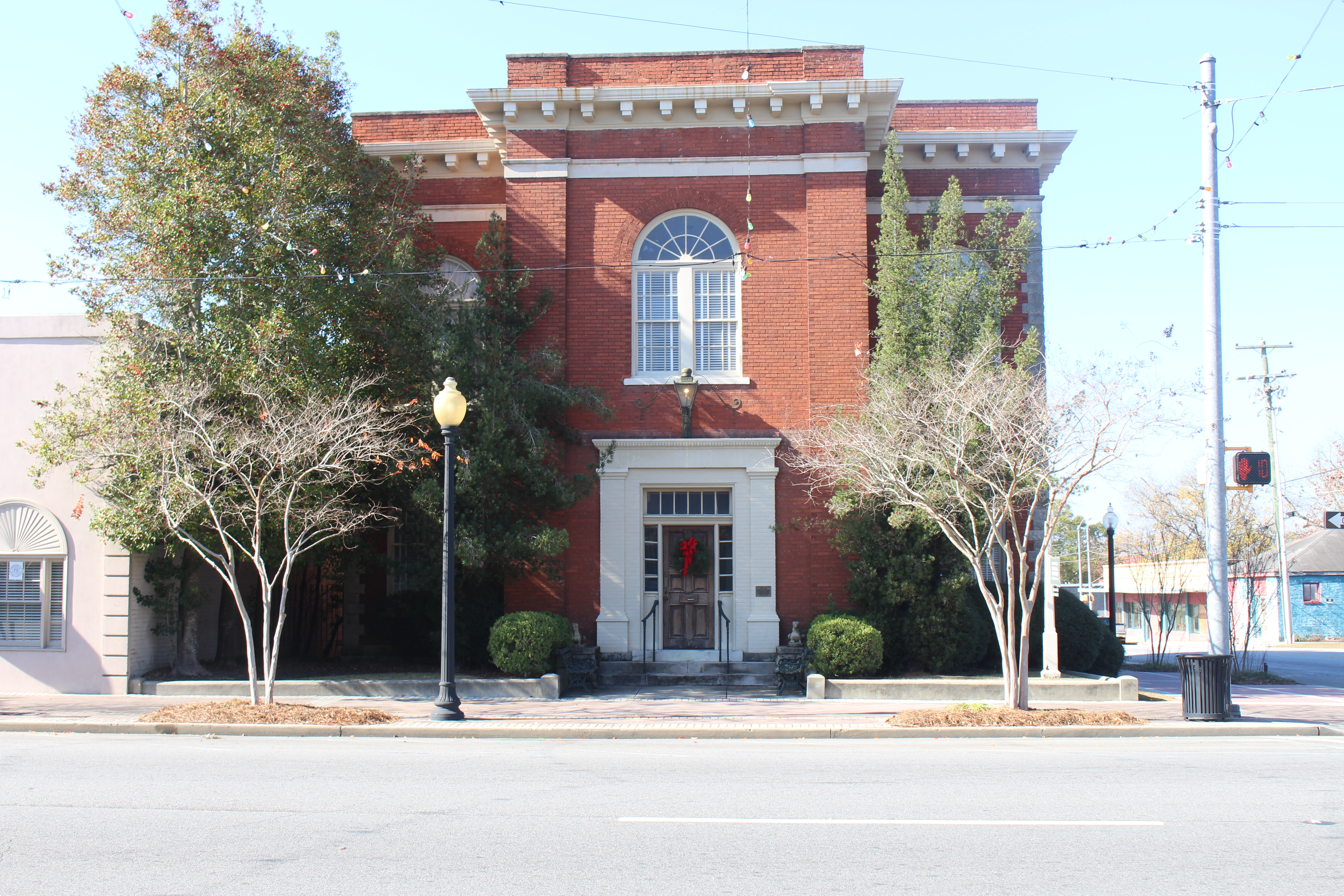
- Carnegie Library of Moultrie in Moultrie, Georgia

- Location within Georgia
- Location: 39 N. Main St., Moultrie, Georgia
- Coordinates: 31°10′50″N 83°47′21″W
- Area: 0.2 acres (0.081 ha)
- Built: 1908
- Built by: G.W. Milligan Cement Construction Co
- Architect: T.F. Lockwood
- Architectural style: Colonial Revival
- NRHP reference No.: 82002397
- Added to NRHP: July 15, 1982

The Carnegie Library of Moultrie is a historic Carnegie Library on a corner lot in downtown Moultrie, Georgia that was built in 1908. It was added to the National Register of Historic Places in 1982. It is located at 39 North Main Street.

It is a two-story red brick building with some Georgian Revival elements. Its brick walls are load-bearing and laid in stretcher bond upon a rusticated cut stone foundation. It has quoins made of the same rusticated granite stone. Its front entrance is flanked by pilasters.

The building was modified in cosmetic ways in 1973 when the building was converted to law offices.

It is one of the oldest public buildings in Moultrie.

It is a contributing building in the NRHP-listed Moultrie Commercial Historic District.

The 1982 NRHP nomination stated that the library's architect was unknown, but the 1994 nomination document for the district lists T.F. Lockwood as the architect.

== See also ==
- National Register of Historic Places listings in Colquitt County, Georgia
