= Spence Air Base =

Former USAF base in Colquitt County, Georgia

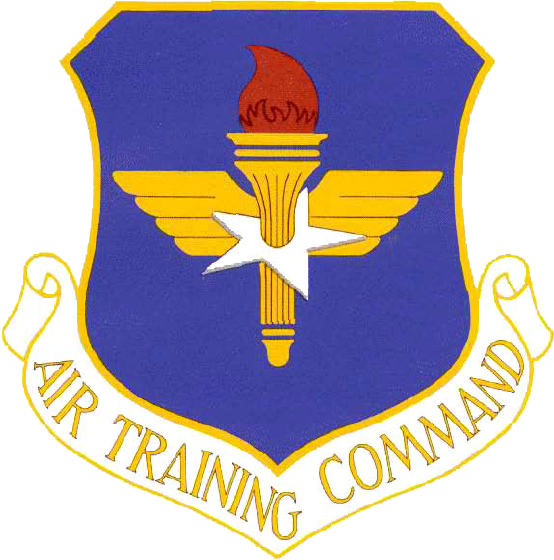
Spence Air Base Spence Army Airfield
- Part of Air Training Command
- Located near: Moultrie, Georgia
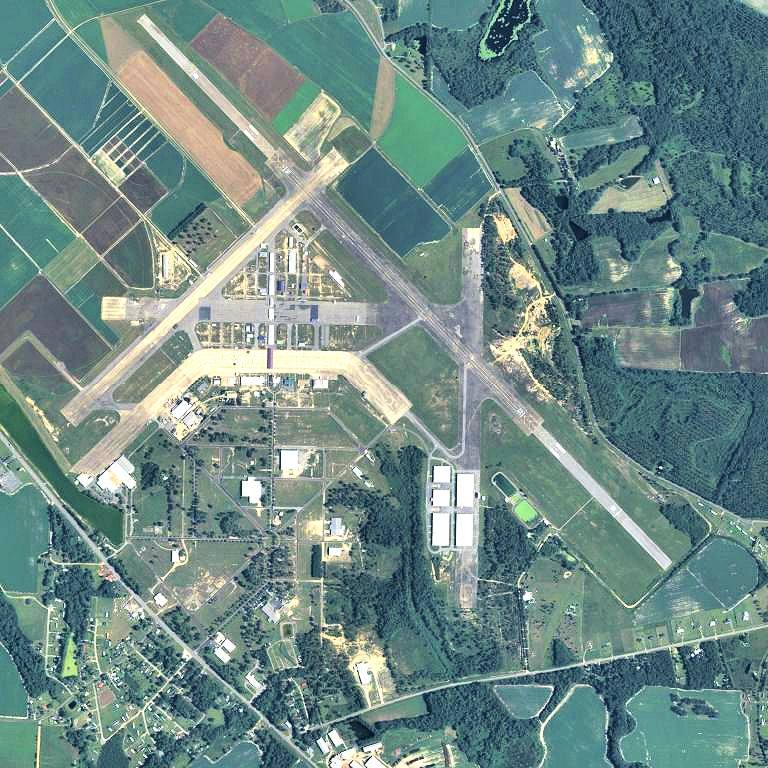
- 2006 USGS airphoto

Site information
- Type: Air Force Base

Location
- Location of Spence Air Base, Georgia
- Coordinates: 31°08′16″N 83°42′15″W

Site history
- Built: 1941
- In use: 1941–1945; 1953–1961

Garrison information
- Garrison: Army Air Forces Advanced Flying School (1941–1945); 3302d Pilot Training Group (1953–1961)

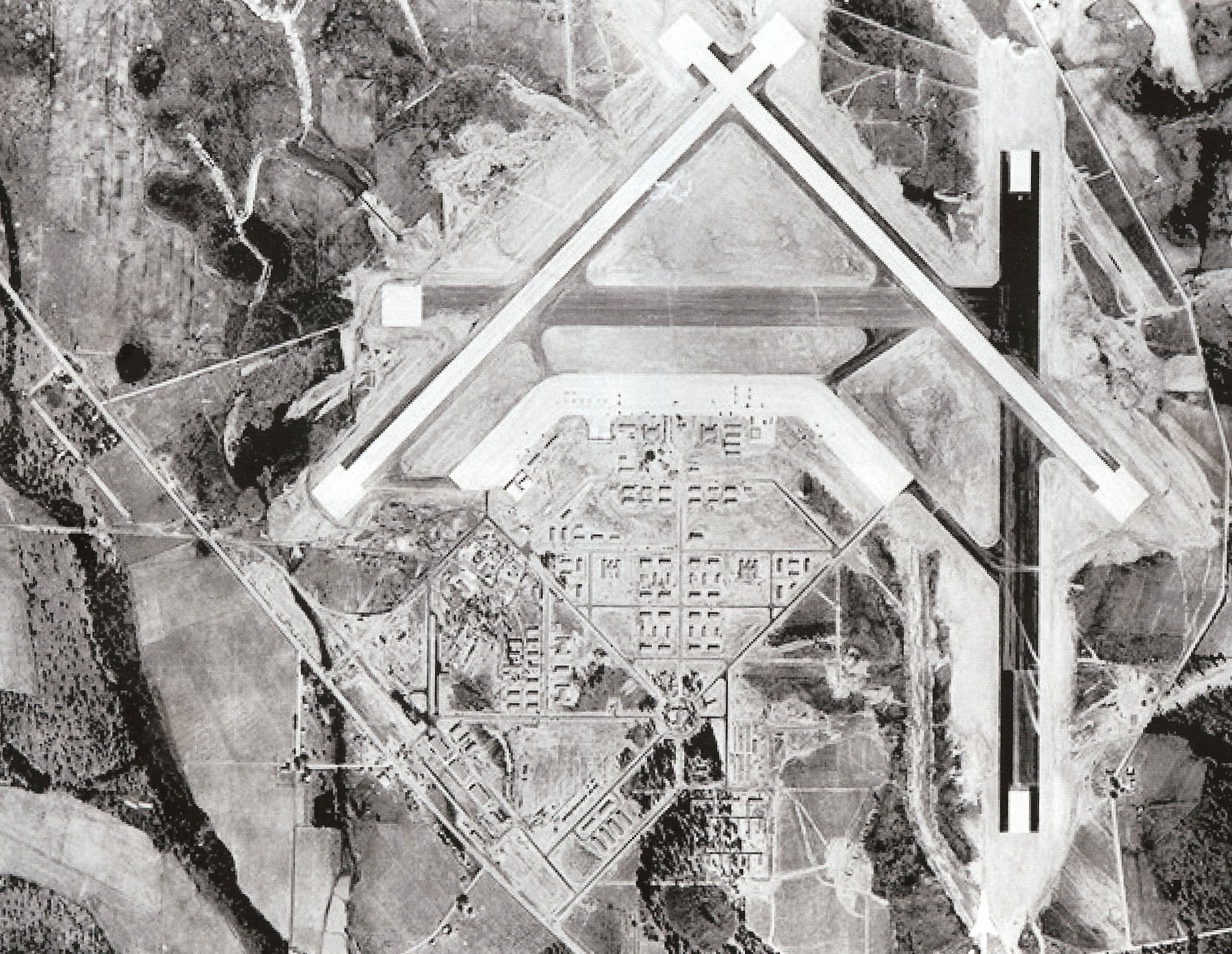
Spence Army Airfield aerial photo, 1943

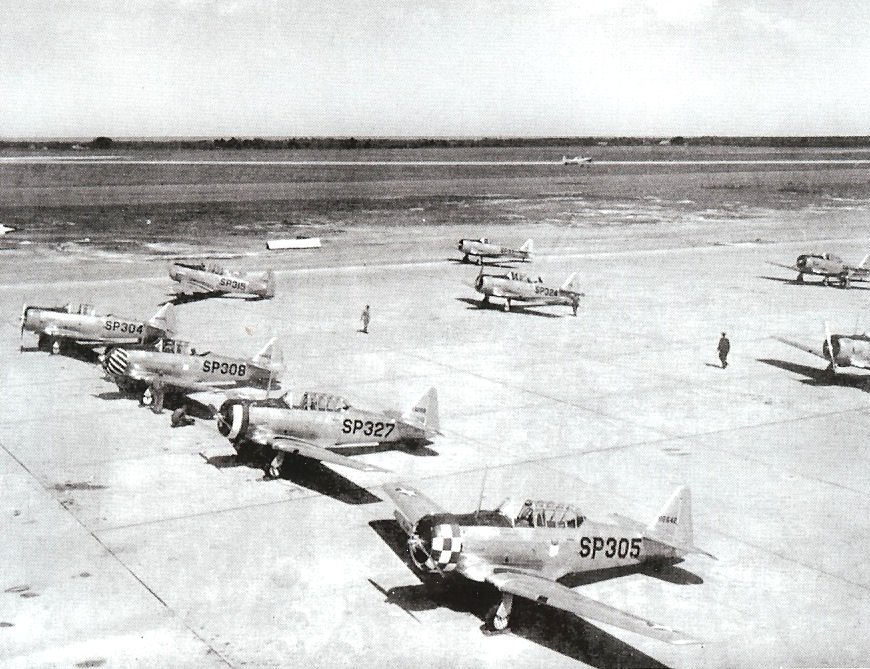
North American AT-6 Texan advanced flight trainers, 1943. "SP" was the fuselage code for Spence AAF

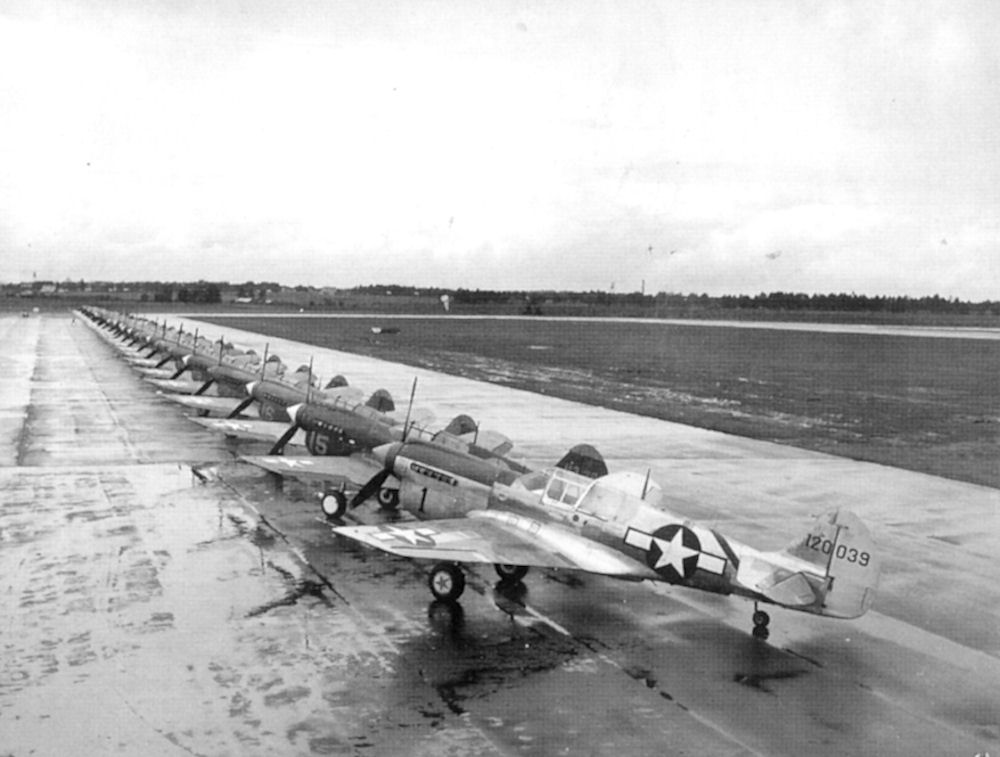
Curtiss P-40F Warhawks after their arrival at Spence AAF, 1944. Curtiss P-40F-20-CU 41-20039 in foreground.

Spence Air Base was a United States Air Force base that operated from 1941 to 1961. It was later reopened as Spence Airport.

== History ==
The City of Moultrie gained its first official municipal airport, Clark Field, in the 1930s. In 1940, local leaders, aware of the Federal government's airport building program, formed a committee to represent the community. The committee then contacted the Civil Aeronautics Administration (CAA) about the possibility of acquiring a modern CAA built airport at Moultrie. The CAA, receptive to the idea, informed the committee that once the local government provided the land the Federal government would fund the building of an airfield. Due to the impossibility of expanding Clark Field for a modern airport, Moultrie and Colquitt County then took an option on a tract of land northeast of the city. When the committee members learned the Army planned on establishing additional training bases in the Southeast, they traveled to Maxwell AAF, Alabama to secure an Air Corps airfield on the site. Air Corps engineers came to Moultrie in March 1941. After inspecting the first site, they selected a more desirable site five miles (8 km) southeast of the city. In June, after the War Department approved the second site, Moultrie and Colquitt County purchased the 1,600 acres (6.5 km^{2}) involved.

=== World War II ===
Construction got underway on 15 July 1941 involving building airplane hangars, three concrete runways, several taxiways and a large parking apron and a control tower. Several large hangars were also constructed. Buildings were ultimately utilitarian and quickly assembled. Most base buildings, not meant for long-term use, were constructed of temporary or semi-permanent materials. Although some hangars had steel frames and the occasional brick or tile brick building could be seen, most support buildings sat on concrete foundations but were of frame construction clad in little more than plywood and tarpaper.

It was named Spence Army Airfield after World War I hero Lt. Thomas Lewis Spence of Thomasville, Georgia who died in a 1918 aircraft crash in France. When the attack on Pearl Harbor came on 7 December 1941 a small military detachment of 27 officers and 39 enlisted men staffed the airfield

It was used by the Army Air Forces Flying Training Command, Southeast Training Center (later Eastern Flying Training Command) for advanced single-engine flying training. The Army Air Forces Pilot School (Advanced Single-Engine) activated on 15 November 1941. The North American AT-6 Texan was the primary aircraft operated by the school.

During World War II, Spence AAF controlled several auxiliary airfields:

- Berlin Auxiliary Field 31°02′50.124″N 83°34′46.31″W (no trace today)
- Norman Park Auxiliary Field 31°17′55″N 83°44′24″W (no trace today)
- Moultrie Municipal Airport 31°05′06″N 083°48′12″W
- Tifton Municipal Airport 31°25′44″N 083°29′19″W

By September 1942, Spence AAF had 146 AT-6s. The peak of training took place in 1943. Instrument training took place at Moultrie Municipal (Aux No. 3). Typically, 37 instructors with 83 enlisted men in support conducted instrument training with 33 AT-6s from the Moultrie Municipal auxiliary base. One of Spence's shortcomings was the lack of a gunnery range. As a result, all classes deployed to Eglin AAF, Florida for two weeks of gunnery training.

In early 1944, the first P-40 Warhawks arrived at Spence AAF. Initially, only the best students received P-40 training. Once sufficient numbers of P-40s were acquired, all students were given five hours of P-40 training. With the addition of P-40 training, the single-engine training syllabus was extended from 10 to 15 weeks. After cadets received 70 hrs. training in the AT-6 and five hours in the P-40, they were commissioned and given five more hours in the P-40.

Spence, as other Army Air Force installations in Georgia, had its contingent of Women Airforce Service Pilots or WASPs. Their numbers were small, usually around four or five, but they performed utility flying that freed AAF pilots for more important duties. WASPs made engineering test flights after engine changes and broke in the engines of new aircraft. They ferried mail and personnel to the gunnery detachment at Eglin Field. WASPs rode with instructors and supervisory pilots during instrument proficiency fights and kept an eye out for conflicting air traffic. They also ferried aircraft and flew to Robins AAF near Macon to pick up critically needed parts.

With the graduation of the class on 11 March 1945, Spence ended single-engine advanced training. The AAF also closed the basic flying school at Cochran AAF in Macon and moved basic flying instruction to Spence flying the AT-6 aircraft previously used for the advanced training. This was not without controversy, as it was felt that flying cadets who received their primary training in PT-17 Stearman biplanes were not ready to fly the AT-6. Flight training continued until the airfield was placed on temporary inactive status on 30 November 1945.

Spence AAF became a satellite of Tyndall Field, Florida effective 15 December 1945, but remained inactive as a military airfield throughout the rest of the 1940s, returning to civil use as Spence Airport. Local industry, government, and civic organizations used Spence Field for a wide variety of purposes. A circus even used the base for its winter quarters one year housing its elephants in one of the hangars.

=== Spence Air Base ===
As a result of the Cold War and the expansion of the United States Air Force, Spence Air Base was reopened and activated 16 April 1951 by the USAF Air Training Command, as a contract flying training school. The base had deteriorated badly over its six idle years and a major renovation project was required to return it to acceptable standards. The 3302d Flying Training Squadron (Contract Flying) was the operational training unit at the base, with ground and flight training being supplied by the Hawthorne School of Aeronautics. Repair work was still underway when the first United States Air Force (USAF) class, Class 52-C, reported for training on 15 May 1951.

The base conducted flying training and contract flying training initially with T-6G Texans and Piper PA-18 Super Cub trainers, later being upgraded to Beechcraft T-34 Mentor and North American T-28 Trojans in early 1954.

For a brief period during 1956 United States Army pilot trainees were trained in Cessna L-19 aircraft at Spence AB. Spence Instructor Pilots received training in army procedures and six army classes totaling 148 trainees graduated between 4 January and 29 June 1956. Training was conducted off of the sod area at Spence and the Sunset Auxiliary field nearby. This program was a precursor of the later Hawthorne School of Aeronautics contract Army Primary Flight Training Program at Lowe Field (now Lowe Army Heliport) at Fort Rucker, Alabama.

From 1954 to 1959, Air Force One, the Lockheed Constellation Columbine, landed at Spence Air Base no less than six times. President Dwight D. Eisenhower passed through Spence while en route to the plantation of the former United States Secretary of the Treasury, George Humphrey, in Thomasville. In 1957, Henry Cabot Lodge and John Foster Dulles also flew in to confer with Eisenhower in Thomasville.

The base received Cessna T-37 Tweet jet trainers starting in December 1959 as part of "Project All-Jet" in attempt to determine effectiveness of primary flight training in one type of aircraft.

In 1960, ATC began looking at a new training concept—combining preflight, primary, and basic instruction into consolidated pilot training (CPT), which evolved into the current undergraduate pilot training (UPT) format. Secretary of the Air Force Dudley C. Sharp approved the idea in March 1960, and Air Training Command intended to have the training program in operation by March 1961. At the same time, Secretary Sharp approved initiation of a consolidated pilot training program, ATC decided to replace all civilian flying instructors with military officers and to phase out all contract primary schools.

Spence AB ended contract primary training in early December, with the transfer of the T-37 aircraft being completed by 23 December 1960. The base was inactivated and returned to civilian control on 31 March 1961, becoming Spence Airport.

=== Civil use ===
However, the USAF was still a presence at the civilian airport after its formal inactivation. Moody AFB in Valdosta made an agreement with the City of Moultrie to use the airfield for an Air Force auxiliary field. The Air Force extended the north¬west/southeast runway to 8,000 ft (2,400 m) for use by Moody's T-33 Shooting Stars, followed by its T-37 Tweets and T-38 Talons. The military use of Spence Airport continues into the current day. Between 2000 and 2005, Spence served as an auxiliary field for the pilot training program at Moody, being used for take off and landing operations by their Raytheon T-6 Texan II turbo-prop trainers. As of 2008, Spence Airport still averages over 20 military flight operations per day.

Part of the cantonment area eventually became the Moultrie Regional Industrial Park and a county correctional institution. In 1968, Maule Aircraft built a manufacturing plant at Spence where it remains to this day. In 1978, Spence first hosted the Sunbelt Agricultural Exposition. In 2004, the Sunbelt Expo has grown into the world's largest farm show with over 1,000 exhibitors. Since many of the visitors fly to the show, Spence's former control tower is staffed during the event to control air traffic. Sunbelt Expo maintains a year-round administration center at Spence.

Today, three of Spence's wartime hangars are still in existence. Other buildings built by the Army Air Forces during the war also remain.

== See also ==
- Georgia World War II Army Airfields
- 28th Flying Training Wing (World War II)
