= John Samuel Shenker =

American football player (born 1998)

Profile
- Position: Tight end

Personal information
- Born: September 2, 1998 (age 28); Albany, Georgia, U.S.
- Listed height: 6 ft 3 in (1.91 m)
- Listed weight: 249 lb (113 kg)

Career information
- High school: Colquitt County (Norman Park, Georgia)
- College: Auburn (2017–2022)
- NFL draft: 2023: undrafted

Career history
- Las Vegas Raiders (2023)*; Arizona Cardinals (2023)*; Las Vegas Raiders (2024)
- * Offseason or practice squad member only
- Stats at Pro Football Reference

John Samuel Shenker (born September 2, 1998) is an American professional football tight end. He played college football for the Auburn Tigers.

== Early life ==
Shenker, who is originally from Albany, Georgia, began playing football first at Deerfield-Windsor School and then moved on to Colquitt County High School. In recent years, he also highlighted himself as a baseball player, so much so that he was included in the national Under-17 training program. Rated as a low-to-middle prospect (two out of five stars) for college football, Shenker would commit to play college football at Auburn University.

== College career ==
In his first year at Auburn, he was redshirted, so he could train with the team but not play official matches. The following season he joined the team, playing all the seasonal games as a substitute, then returning in 2019 where he also collected five games as a starter and finally in 2020 he became the team's starting tight end. Shenker particularly stood out in the 2021 season in which he set the records for an Auburn tight end for most receptions (33) and receiving yards (413) in a season, as well as becoming the first tight end in college history with at least 30 receptions and 400 receiving yards in a single season. In the 2020 and 2021 seasons he was also part of the Auburn baseball team.

On January 1, 2022, Shenker announced that he would take advantage of the additional year of eligibility granted by the NCAA to players limited by the COVID-19 pandemic to play an additional season with the Tigers. He was elected team captain and at the end of the season set records for career receptions for an Auburn tight end (68) and total games played for the team (62).

Having finished his college career and was ready to turn pro, Shenker participated in the Tropical Bowl, college football's all-star game that allows the best prospects to showcase their qualities to NFL scouts. However, he did not take part in the NFL Combine but in the Pro-Days organized by Auburn where he particularly stood out in the bench press, with 27 repetitions, and in the 40-yard dash done in 4.53 seconds.

=== College statistics ===
Year	Team	Games		Receiving						Rushing			
Year	Team	GP	GS	Rec	Yds	Avg	YPG	Lg	TD	Att	Yds	Avg	TD
2017	Auburn	Redshirt (redshirt)											
2018	Auburn	12	0	3	40	**13.33**	3.3	26	**1**	0	0	0.0	0
2019	Auburn	**13**	5	3	21	7.00	1.6	9	**1**	0	0	0.0	0
2020	Auburn	11	9	9	97	10.78	8.8	26	0	0	0	0.0	0
2021	Auburn	**13**	**12**	**33**	**413**	12.52	**31.8**	**41**	0	1	**1**	**1.0**	0
2022	Auburn	12	**12**	20	208	10.40	17.3	27	**1**	**2**	-3	-1.5	0
Career		61	38	68	779	11.46	12.8	41	3	3	-2	-0.67	0

Career personal bests are in bold

== Professional career ==
Pre-draft measurables
Height	Weight	Arm length	Hand span	40-yard dash	10-yard split	20-yard split	20-yard shuttle	Three-cone drill	Vertical jump	Broad jump	Bench press
6 ft 2 7/8 in (1.90 m)	242 lb (110 kg)	31 7/8 in (0.81 m)	9 3/8 in (0.24 m)	4.89 s	1.72 s	2.69 s	4.57 s	7.47 s	29 in (0.74 m)	9 ft 1 in (2.77 m)	27 reps
All values from Pro Day

=== Las Vegas Raiders (first stint) ===
Shenker went undrafted in the 2023 NFL draft and signed as an undrafted free agent with the Las Vegas Raiders on May 12, 2023. At the end of the preparation phase for the new season, Shenker did not return to the Raiders' active roster and was released on August 29, 2023 only to be added to the practice squad the following day. He was released on October 5, 2023, only to be placed back on the training squad on October 18, 2023 and then released again a week later.

=== Arizona Cardinals ===
Shenker signed to the Arizona Cardinals practice squad on December 20, 2023, but was released six days later.

=== Las Vegas Raiders (second stint) ===
On December 29, 2023, Shenker signed to the Raiders' practice squad for the fourth time of the season.

On January 8, 2024, he signed as a reserve/future contract. He was waived on August 27, and re-signed to the practice squad. He was promoted to the active roster on September 28. He was waived on November 1, and re-signed to the practice squad.
