= Colquitt County High School =

Public high school in Colquitt County, Georgia, United States

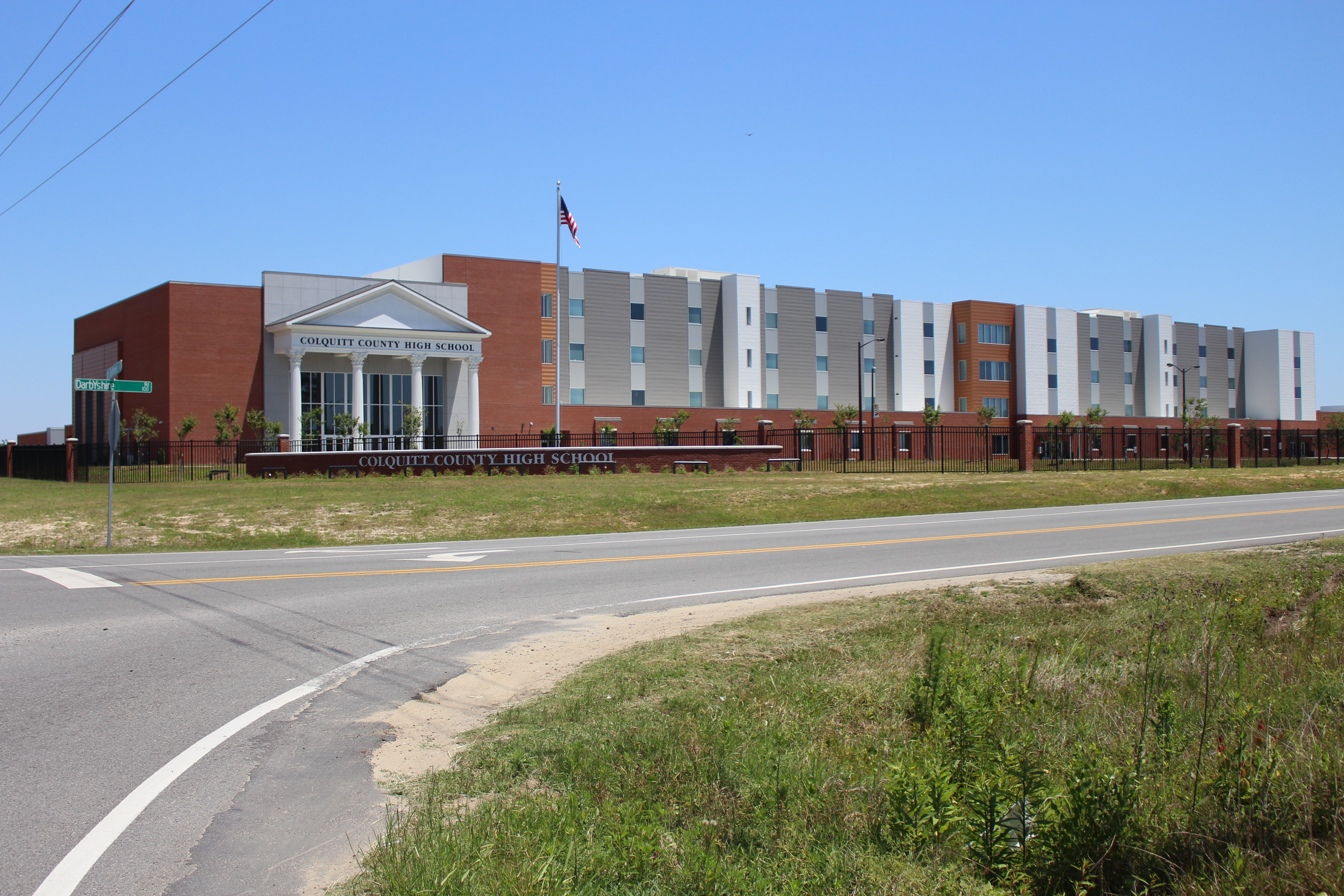

Location
- 105 Darbyshire Rd. Norman Park, Georgia 31771; United States; 31°12′18″N 83°45′33″W

Information
- School type: Public high school
- Motto: "Each Day - Excellence in Every Way"
- School district: Colquitt County School District
- Teaching staff: 122.90 (FTE)
- Grades: 9–12
- Enrollment: 1,871 (2023–2024)
- Student to teacher ratio: 15.22
- Colors: Black and Gold
- Athletics: GHSA Class 1-AAAAAAA
- Mascot: Wild Hawg
- Team name: Packers
- Accreditation: Southern Association of Colleges and Schools
- Website: www.colquitt.k12.ga.us/schools/colquitt-high/index

Colquitt County High School (CCHS) is a public high school located in unincorporated Colquitt County, Georgia, United States, near Moultrie and with a Norman Park postal address; it has a student body averaging 1,700. The school is part of the Colquitt County School District, which serves the whole county.

== Academics ==
According to the Governor's Office of Student Achievement, the high school's four-year graduation rate is 86.2%. The Office also states that 60.7% of the school's graduates are college ready. The school's overall performance is higher than 59% of schools in the state. The Office notes that the school's improvement is on the rise with its rating of "Beating the Odds".

== Athletics ==
=== Sports ===
The following sports are played at CCHS:

- Baseball
- Basketball
- Cheerleading
- Cross country
- Diving
- Football
- Golf
- Gymnastics
- Soccer
- Softball
- Tennis
- Swimming
- Track & field
- Wrestling
- Volleyball

==== Football ====
On January 30, 2008, Rush Propst was named head coach at Colquitt County High School. University of South Alabama head coach Joey Jones interviewed Propst to fill the vacant position as the offensive coordinator. After community uproar over the interview, Propst decided to stay at Colquitt County.

In just his second year of coaching at Colquitt County High School, Propst took a team that had finished 2–8 in 2007 to the state semifinals in 2009. In 2014 and 2015, Colquitt County had undefeated 15-0 records and won the Georgia State High School Football Championship at the Georgia Dome in Atlanta in both seasons.

The 2015 team won a High School Football National Championship when High School Football America named the Packers national champs.

On June 16, 2016, Propst was suspended for one year for head-butting a player during the 2015 playoffs. In July 2016, the appealed suspension was reduced to a reprimand. Colquitt started the 2016 season by losing its first four games.

=== State titles ===
- Baseball (2) - 1997(4A), 2003 (5A) *Girls' Basketball (1) - 1946(B)
- Football (3) - 1994(4A), 2014(6A), 2015(6A)
- Boys' Golf (1) - 2006(5A) *Gymnastics (1) - 2006(All)
- Girls' Tennis (2) - 1986(4A), 1988(4A)

== Extracurricular activities ==
=== Fine arts ===
==== Music ====
Colquitt County High School is home to several instrumental and choral ensembles. They perform throughout the school year in the community, attend festivals and competitions throughout the South, and have represented the school in other countries and the Macy's Thanksgiving Day Parade, among other events. The choral department also prepares a spring musical each year, which has become a popular annual pastime for the community.

=== Academic ===
CCHS boasts a variety of academic extracurricular activities and clubs. These include the Math Team, Book Hawgs, Engineering Club, Key Club, National Honor Society, an Academic Decathlon, team, Latin Club, Science Club, Spanish Club, and Technology Club.

=== Vocational and specialty ===
There are also many vocational and specialty clubs and activities offered to students, including 4-H (Sigma Lambda Chi), FBLA, Fellowship of Christian Athletes, FCCLA, FFA, HOSA, Leo Club, Partnerships for Success, Peer Leadership, ROTC, SkillsUSA, Student Government, Unscripted! Drama Club, and the Y Club.

== History ==
Colquitt County High School is the result of decades of expansions, improvements, and the consolidations of other schools in the county. Notable predecessors to CCHS are Moultrie High School, Norman Park High School, and William Bryant High School. These schools, and others, served Colquitt County students before the merging of the county and city school systems in 1968, and before desegregation around the same time.

== Notable alumni ==
- Bob Alligood, former Florida state legislator
- Antonio Edwards, former American football player
- Daijun Edwards, professional American football player for the Pittsburgh Steelers
- Cameron Erving, professional American football player
- Ryan Fitzgerald, professional American football player for the Carolina Panthers
- Reatha Clark King, chemist
- Nate Lewis, former professional American football player
- Dennis Powell, former professional baseball player
- John Samuel Shenker, American football player for the Las Vegas Raiders
- T. J. Smith, professional American football player
- Carson Tyler, diver
- Jay Ward, professional American football player
