= Daijun Edwards =

American football player (born 2001)

Profile
- Position: Running back

Personal information
- Born: April 11, 2001 (age 25)
- Listed height: 5 ft 10 in (1.78 m)
- Listed weight: 201 lb (91 kg)

Career information
- High school: Colquitt County (Norman Park, Georgia)
- College: Georgia (2020–2023)
- NFL draft: 2024: undrafted

Career history
- Pittsburgh Steelers (2024)*; Montreal Alouettes (2025)*
- * Offseason or practice squad member only

Awards and highlights
- 2× CFP national champion (2021, 2022)

Sevarian Daijun Edwards (born April 11, 2001) is an American professional football running back. He played college football for the Georgia Bulldogs. He also had brief stints with the Pittsburgh Steelers of the National Football League (NFL) and the Montreal Alouettes of the Canadian Football League (CFL).

== Early life ==
Edwards attended Colquitt County High School in Norman Park, Georgia, where he rushed for 4,327 yards and 62 touchdowns on 690 carries and brought in 69 receptions for 748 yards and two touchdowns. He set the Colquitt County record for career rushing yards and rushing touchdowns. Edwards committed to play college football at the University of Georgia over Florida State.

== College career ==
In the 2020 regular season finale, Edwards rushed for 103 yards and his first career touchdown in a win over Missouri. He finished the 2020 season with 218 yards and a touchdown on 37 carries, while also catching one pass for three yards. In week 4 of the 2021 season, Edwards rushed for a touchdown and forced a fumble in a 62–0 win over Vanderbilt. He finished the 2021 season with 215 yards and three touchdowns on 49 carries, while also bringing in two receptions for 42 yards. In 2021 Edwards helped guide the Georgia Bulldogs to a national championship win. In week 6 of the 2022 season, he rushed for 83 yards and three touchdowns in a win over Auburn. In week 9, Edwards rushed for 106 yards and two touchdowns in a win over Florida. He finished the 2022 season as his best, rushing 140 times for 769 yards and seven touchdowns, while also hauling in 14 receptions for 101 yards. Edwards also helped guide the Bulldogs to second consecutive national championship.

== Professional career ==
Pre-draft measurables
Height	Weight	Arm length	Hand span	Wingspan	40-yard dash	10-yard split	20-yard split	20-yard shuttle	Three-cone drill	Vertical jump	Broad jump	Bench press
5 ft 9 5/8 in (1.77 m)	207 lb (94 kg)	29 3/4 in (0.76 m)	9 1/2 in (0.24 m)	5 ft 11 3/4 in (1.82 m)	4.71 s	1.63 s	2.74 s	4.32 s	7.20 s	30.0 in (0.76 m)	9 ft 6 in (2.90 m)	15 reps
All values from NFL Combine/Pro Day

Edwards signed with the Pittsburgh Steelers as an undrafted free agent on April 27, 2024. He was waived on August 26.

Edwards was signed by the Montreal Alouettes on February 10, 2025. He was released on May 13, 2025 after just two days of Alouettes training camp, reportedly showing up overweight and out of shape, and failing to demonstrate professionalism with Alouettes management regarding the situation.
