= T. J. Smith =

American football player (born 1997)

Profile
- Position: Defensive tackle

Personal information
- Born: April 19, 1997 (age 29); Moultrie, Georgia, U.S.
- Listed height: 6 ft 3 in (1.91 m)
- Listed weight: 300 lb (136 kg)

Career information
- High school: North Stanly (New London, North Carolina); Colquitt County (Moultrie, Georgia)
- College: Arkansas (2016–2019)
- NFL draft: 2020: undrafted

Career history
- Los Angeles Chargers (2020)*; Minnesota Vikings (2021–2023); Carolina Panthers (2024); Tennessee Titans (2025)*; Orlando Storm (2026)*
- * Offseason or practice squad member only

Career NFL statistics as of 2023
- Total tackles: 11
- Stats at Pro Football Reference

Fredrick "T. J." Smith (born April 19, 1997) is an American professional football defensive tackle. He played college football for the Arkansas Razorbacks and was signed as an undrafted free agent by the Los Angeles Chargers in 2020. Smith also played for the Minnesota Vikings.

== Early life ==
Smith was born in Moultrie, Georgia to Frederick and Avis Smith. Smith originally attended North Stanly High School, where he was all-state for North Carolina high school football. Leading into his senior year, Smith transferred to Colquitt County High School. He helped Colquitt County win the state title in their respective region.

== College career ==
Rated as the 142nd best player in the nation by ESPN, Smith chose to attend Arkansas after changing his original commitment to Vanderbilt. Smith redshirted his freshman year and in his redshirt freshman year, Smith only played in five games and had minimal statistics. In his sophomore year, Smith started all twelve games and improved his tackle amount from four in the year prior to twenty-six. In his junior year, Smith once again played in all twelve games. Smith's contributions in his Junior year helped Arkansas tally a team total of 882 tackles that year. In his senior and final year, Smith for a third time started all twelve games, although his tackle amount decreased from the previous two years.

== Professional career ==
Pre-draft measurables
Height	Weight	Arm length	Hand span	40-yard dash	10-yard split	20-yard split	20-yard shuttle	Three-cone drill	Vertical jump	Broad jump	Bench press
6 ft 2 1/2 in (1.89 m)	296 lb (134 kg)	34 in (0.86 m)	10 in (0.25 m)	5.00 s	1.69 s	2.84 s	4.59 s	7.47 s	30.5 in (0.77 m)	9 ft 4 in (2.84 m)	29 reps
All values from Pro Day

=== Los Angeles Chargers ===
After going undrafted in the 2020 NFL draft, Smith was signed by the Los Angeles Chargers as an undrafted free agent. Smith spent the entirety of the 2020 NFL season on the practice squad and was released before the 2021 regular season.

=== Minnesota Vikings ===
Midway through the 2021 NFL season, the Minnesota Vikings signed Smith to their practice squad. Smith was then elevated to the active roster before the week 12 game against the San Francisco 49ers. He signed a reserve/future contract with the Vikings on January 10, 2022.

On August 30, 2022, Smith was waived by the Vikings as a part of final roster cuts and re-signed to the practice squad the next day. He signed a reserve/future contract on January 20, 2023.

On August 29, 2023, Smith was waived by the Vikings as part of final roster cuts and signed to the practice squad the next day. He was promoted to the active roster on December 30.

=== Carolina Panthers ===
On May 13, 2024, Smith signed with the Carolina Panthers. He was waived on August 27, and re-signed to the practice squad. He was promoted to the active roster on October 19. Smith was released and re-signed to the practice squad on October 23.

=== Tennessee Titans ===
On August 18, 2025, Smith signed with the Tennessee Titans. However, Smith was released by the Titans during preliminary roster cuts on August 25.

=== Orlando Storm ===
On March 9, 2026, Smith signed with the Orlando Storm of the United Football League (UFL). He was released on March 19.
