= Colquitt County Jail =

- U.S. National Register of Historic Places
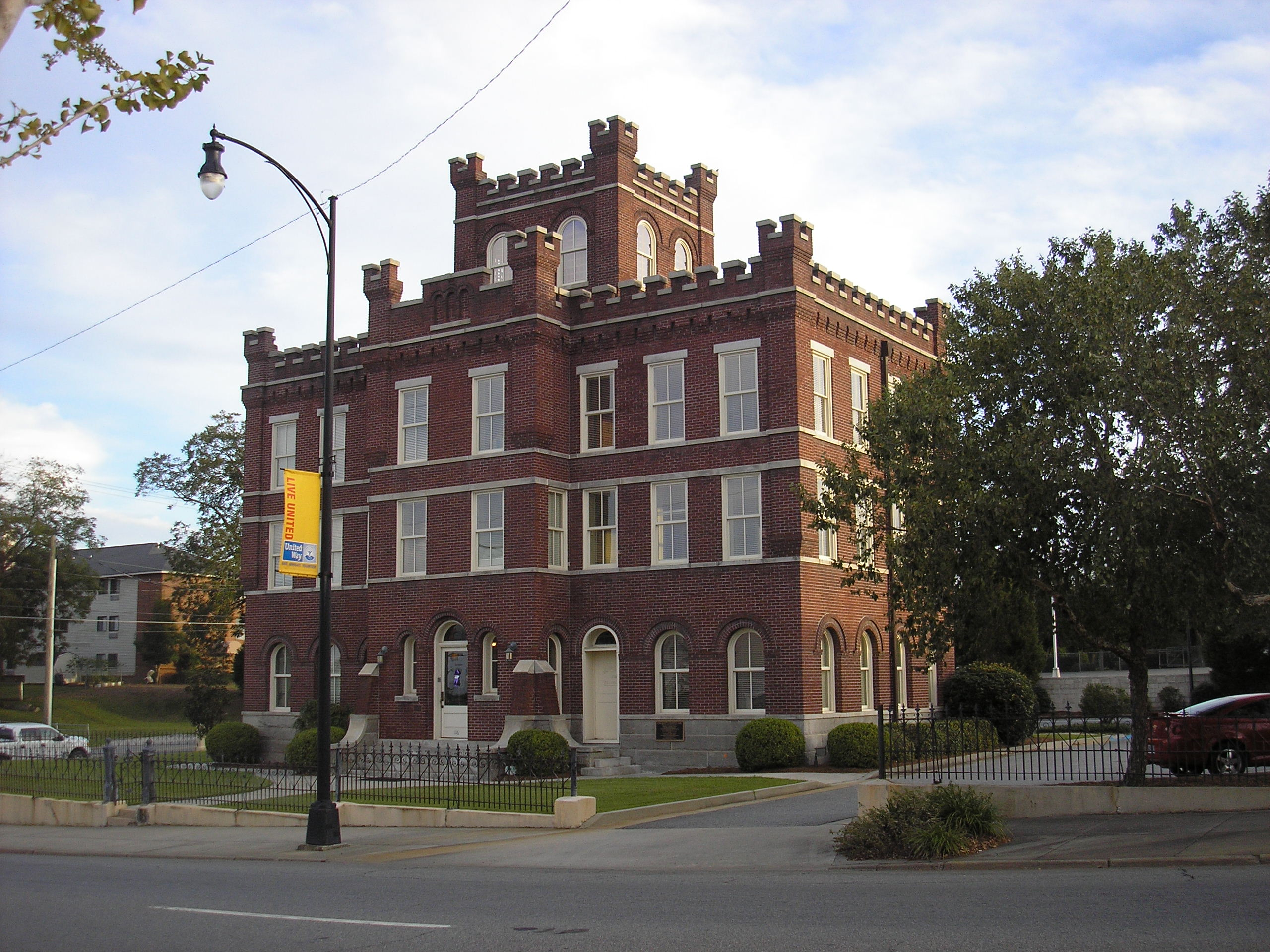

- Location within Georgia Location within the United States
- Location: 126 1st Ave., SE, Moultrie, Georgia
- Coordinates: 31°10′42″N 83°47′12″W
- Area: 0.5 acres (0.20 ha)
- Built: 1915
- Built by: Southern Structural Steel Co.
- Architectural style: Late Gothic Revival
- NRHP reference No.: 80001004
- Added to NRHP: October 10, 1980

Colquitt County Jail is a historic jail building at 126 1st Avenue SE in Moultrie, Georgia that was built in 1915. It was added to the National Register of Historic Places in 1980.

The previous jail was a brick building, the second brick building in Moultrie, that was built in 1892 and was torn down in 1953. This jail, built in 1915 just to the north of the old one, is "among the most impressive buildings in Moultrie and is one of the county's few examples of Gothic Revival architecture." It cost about $28,000.

== See also ==
- National Register of Historic Places listings in Colquitt County, Georgia
