= Spence Airport =

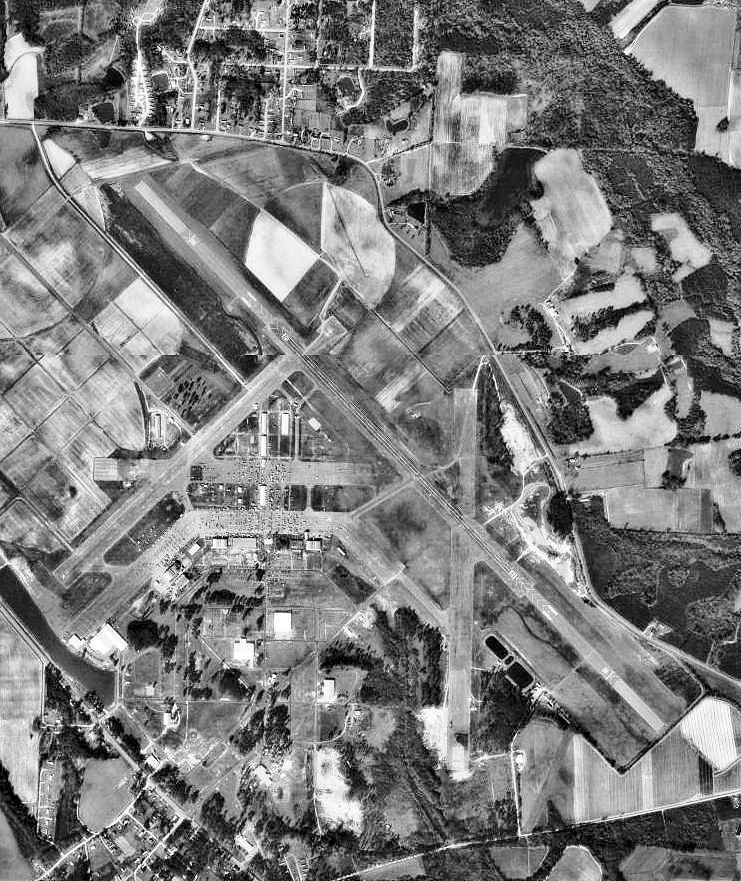
- USGS aerial image, 1993
- IATA: MUL; ICAO: KMUL; FAA LID: MUL

Summary
- Airport type: Public
- Owner: City of Moultrie
- Serves: Moultrie, Georgia
- Elevation AMSL: 292 ft (89 m)
- Coordinates: 31°08′16″N 083°42′15″W
- Interactive map of Spence Airport

Runways
| Direction | Length | | Surface |
| Direction | ft | m | Surface |
|---|---|---|---|
| 14/32 | 4,500 | 1,372 | Concrete |

Statistics (2008)
- Aircraft operations: 18,100
- Based aircraft: 3
- Source: Federal Aviation Administration

Spence Airport (IATA: MUL, ICAO: KMUL, FAA LID: MUL) is a city-owned public-use airport located four nautical miles (7 km) southeast of the central business district of Moultrie, Colquitt County, Georgia, United States. The airport serves the general aviation community, with no scheduled commercial airline service.

== History ==
The City of Moultrie gained its first official municipal airport, Clark Field, in the 1930s. In 1940, local leaders, aware of the Federal government's airport building program, formed a committee to represent the community. The committee then contacted the Civil Aeronautics Administration (CAA) about the possibility of acquiring a modern CAA built airport at Moultrie. The CAA, receptive to the idea, informed the committee that once the local government provided the land the Federal government would fund the building of an airfield. Due to the impossibility of expanding Clark Field for a modern airport, Moultrie and Colquitt County then took an option on a tract of land northeast of the city. When the committee members learned the Army planned on establishing additional training bases in the Southeast, they traveled to Maxwell AAF, Alabama to secure an Air Corps airfield on the site. Air Corps engineers came to Moultrie in March 1941. After inspecting the first site, they selected a more desirable site five miles (8 km) southeast of the city. In June, after the War Department approved the second site, Moultrie and Colquitt County purchased the 1,600 acres (6.5 km^{2}) involved.

=== Military use ===
The airport was used for many years by the military, finally being closed as Spence Air Base.

=== Civil use ===
However, the USAF was still a presence at the civilian airport after its formal inactivation. Moody AFB in Valdosta made an agreement with the City of Moultrie to use the airfield for an Air Force auxiliary field. The Air Force extended the north¬west/southeast runway to 8,000 ft (2,400 m) for use by Moody's T-33 Shooting Stars, followed by its T-37 Tweets and T-38 Talons. The military use of Spence Airport continues into the current-day. Between 2000 and 2005, Spence served as an auxiliary field for the undergraduate pilot training program that was a tenant activity at Moody AFB, being used for take off and landing operations by their Raytheon T-6 Texan II turbo-prop trainers. As of 2008, Spence Airport averaged over 20 military flight operations per day. With removal of T-6 Texan II aircraft from Moody AFB, military flight operations are now limited to the occasional HH-60G Pave Hawk helicopter or HC-130P Hercules.

Given this reduced use by high-performance fixed-wing military aircraft, the portion of the main runway that continues to be maintained has been reduced from 8,000 to 4,500 ft (1,400 m).

Part of the cantonment area eventually became the Moultrie Regional Industrial Park and a county correctional institution. In 1968, Maule Aircraft built a manufacturing plant at Spence where it remains to this day. In 1978, Spence first hosted the Sunbelt Agricultural Exposition. In 2004, the Sunbelt Expo has grown into the world's largest farm show with over 1,000 exhibitors. Since many of the visitors fly to the show, Spence's old control tower is staffed during the event to control air traffic. Sunbelt Expo maintains a year-round administration center at Spence.

Today, three of Spence's wartime hangars are still in existence. Other buildings built during the war also remain.

== Facilities and aircraft ==
Spence Airport covers an area of 100 acres (40 ha) at an elevation of 292 feet (89 m) above mean sea level. It has one runway designated 14/32 with a concrete surface measuring 4,500 by 75 feet (1,372 x 23 m).

For the 12-month period ending September 11, 2008, the airport had 18,100 aircraft operations, an average of 49 per day: 55% general aviation and 45% military. At that time there were 3 aircraft based at this airport: 33.3% single-engine and 66.7% multi-engine.

== See also ==
- List of airports in Georgia (U.S. state)
