= Moultrie Municipal Airport =

Airport in Colquitt County, Georgia, US

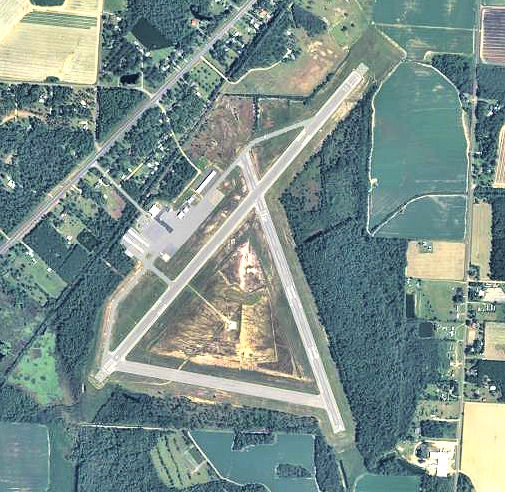
- 2006 USGS photo
- IATA: MGR; ICAO: KMGR; FAA LID: MGR

Summary
- Airport type: Public
- Owner: City of Moultrie
- Serves: Moultrie, Georgia
- Elevation AMSL: 294 ft (90 m)
- Coordinates: 31°05′06″N 83°48′12″W

Map
- Location within Georgia

Runways
Direction	Length		Surface
Direction	ft	m	Surface
4/22	5,129	1,563	Asphalt
16/34	3,878	1,182	Asphalt

Statistics (2010)
- Aircraft operations: 15,500
- Based aircraft: 29
- Source: Federal Aviation Administration

Moultrie Municipal Airport (IATA: MGR, ICAO: KMGR, FAA LID: MGR) is seven miles south of Moultrie in Colquitt County, Georgia, United States. The National Plan of Integrated Airport Systems for 2011–2015 categorized it as a general aviation facility. It has no airline service.

== History ==
Moultrie Airport was built before World War II; during the war it was used as an auxiliary training field for Spence Army Airfield a few miles to the northeast. Known as Spence AAF Auxiliary No. 3 It hosted the 455th School Squadron (Special) beginning on August 1, 1941 while still a civil airport.

The airfield was released from military use on December 15, 1945 and returned to civil use. Southern Airways Douglas DC-3s began flights to Moultrie in 1949, but probably at Spence initially; by 1955 they were at Sunset Field, as it was then known. Southern then replaced its DC-3s with Martin 404 prop aircraft followed by Swearingen Metro II turboprops. Southern merged with Republic Airlines which in turn operated Convair 580 turboprops with Republic ceasing all service into Moultrie in 1981. Moultrie dropped out of the Official Airline Guide (OAG) in 1988 when Eastern Airlines ceased codeshare commuter turboprop flights from Atlanta.

== Facilities ==
The airport covers 369 acres (149 ha) at an elevation of 294 feet (90 m). It has two asphalt runways: 4/22 is 5,129 by 100 feet (1,563 x 30 m) and 16/34 is 3,878 by 75 feet (1,182 x 23 m). (Runway 10 closed in the 1970s.)

In the year ending August 11, 2010 the airport had 15,500 general aviation operations, average 42 per day. 29 aircraft were then based at the airport: 93% single-engine and 7% multi-engine.

== See also ==
- Georgia World War II Army Airfields
- List of airports in Georgia (U.S. state)
