= WMTM (AM) =

Radio station in Moultrie, Georgia

- Moultrie, Georgia; United States
- Frequency: 1300 kHz

Programming
- Format: Southern gospel
- Affiliations: ABC Radio

Ownership
- Owner: Colquitt Broadcasting Company, LLC

History
- First air date: 1953

Technical information
- Licensing authority: FCC
- Facility ID: 12382
- Class: D
- Power: 5,000 watts day 60 watts night
- Transmitter coordinates: 31°10′24.00″N 83°44′50.00″W
- Translator: 105.1 W286BO (New Elm)

Links
- Public license information: Public file; LMS

WMTM (1300 AM) is a Christian radio station broadcasting a Southern gospel format. It is licensed to Moultrie, Georgia, United States. The station is currently owned by Colquitt Broadcasting Company, LLC and features programming from ABC Radio and CNN Radio.

== History ==
On June 3, 1953, the Federal Communications Commission awarded Norris B. Mills and Douglas J. Turner, doing business as the Colquitt Broadcasting Company, a construction permit for a new 1,000-watt, daytime-only station at Moultrie. The station signed on that November and increased power to 5,000 watts in November 1954. WMTM-FM 93.9 was added on November 17, 1964; five years later, Turner bought out Mills's stake in the station. The station aired primarily country music with some contemporary hit radio programming.

Douglas Turner died in 2000. After Doug's son Donnie died in 1996, Donnie's son Jim took over operations.
