= Henry Crawford Tucker Log House and Farmstead =

Historic house in Georgia, United States

- Tucker, Henry Crawford, Log House and Farmstead
- U.S. National Register of Historic Places
- Location within Georgia Location within the United States
- Location: Off GA 37, near Moultrie, Georgia
- Coordinates: 31°12′37″N 83°50′39″W
- Area: 45 acres (18 ha)
- Built by: Tucker, Henry Crawford
- NRHP reference No.: 82002399
- Added to NRHP: July 26, 1982

The Henry Crawford Tucker Log House and Farmstead is a 45 acres (18 ha) property near Moultrie, Georgia which was listed on the National Register of Historic Places in 1982. It is located at the end of a long dirt road, about midway between Funston and Moultrie, in Colquitt County, Georgia.

The house, built in c.1820s to c.1840s, is a one-story dog trot log house, with additional shed porches and enclosed porch rooms. Its main part is built of hand-hewn logs with dove-tail notching.
