= W. W. Ashburn House =

Historic house in Georgia, United States

- U.S. National Register of Historic Places
- Location within Georgia Location within the United States
- Location: 609 1st Ave., Moultrie, Georgia
- Coordinates: 31.17863°N 83.79584°W
- Area: .91 acres (0.37 ha)
- Built: 1900-1901
- Built by: Milligan, G.W.
- Architectural style: Colonial Revival
- NRHP reference No.: 82002396
- Added to NRHP: July 15, 1982

The W.W. Ashburn House, at 609 1st Avenue SW in Moultrie, Georgia, was built in 1900–1901. It was listed on the National Register of Historic Places in 1982.

It is a two-story late Victorian-style house with some Georgian Revival features. It was deemed notable for its architecture and for its association with W. W. Ashburn (1838–1906), bank president of the first bank in Moultrie.

As of 2017, the house was purchased by an unknown buyer and moved to a new location.
