= Colquitt County School District =

School district in Georgia (U.S. state)

Address
- 710 Lane Street SW Moultrie, Georgia, 31768-7759; United States
- Coordinates: 31.205678°N 83.795768°W

District information
- Grades: Pre-kindergarten – 12
- Superintendent: Dan Chappuis
- Accreditation: Cognia Systems Accreditation

Students and staff
- Enrollment: 8,342
- Faculty: 480

Other information
- Website: colquitt.k12.ga.us

The Colquitt County School District is a public school district in Colquitt County, Georgia and based in Moultrie. It serves the communities of Berlin, Doerun, Ellenton, Funston, Moultrie, Norman Park, Omega, and Riverside.

== Schools ==
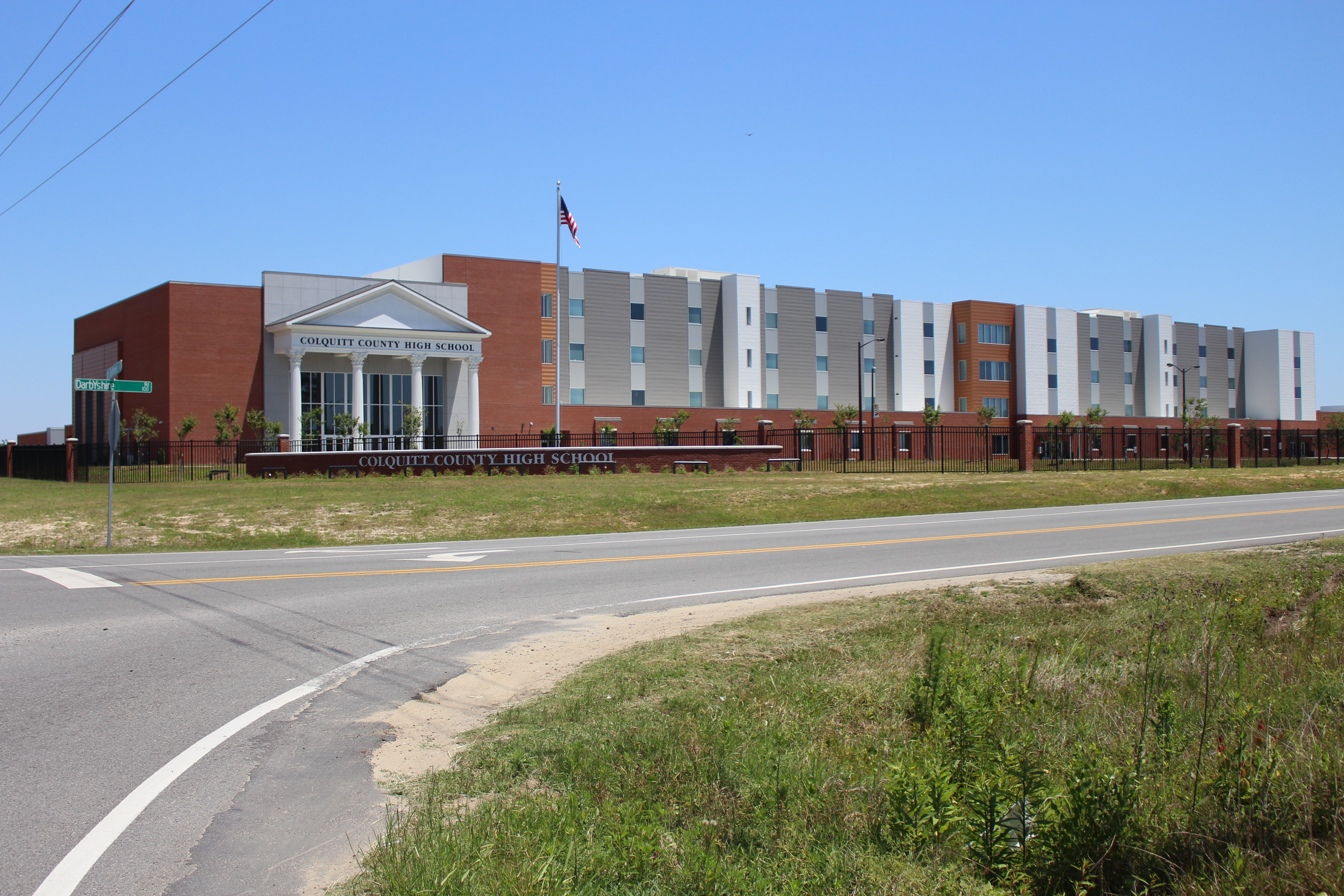
Colquitt County High School

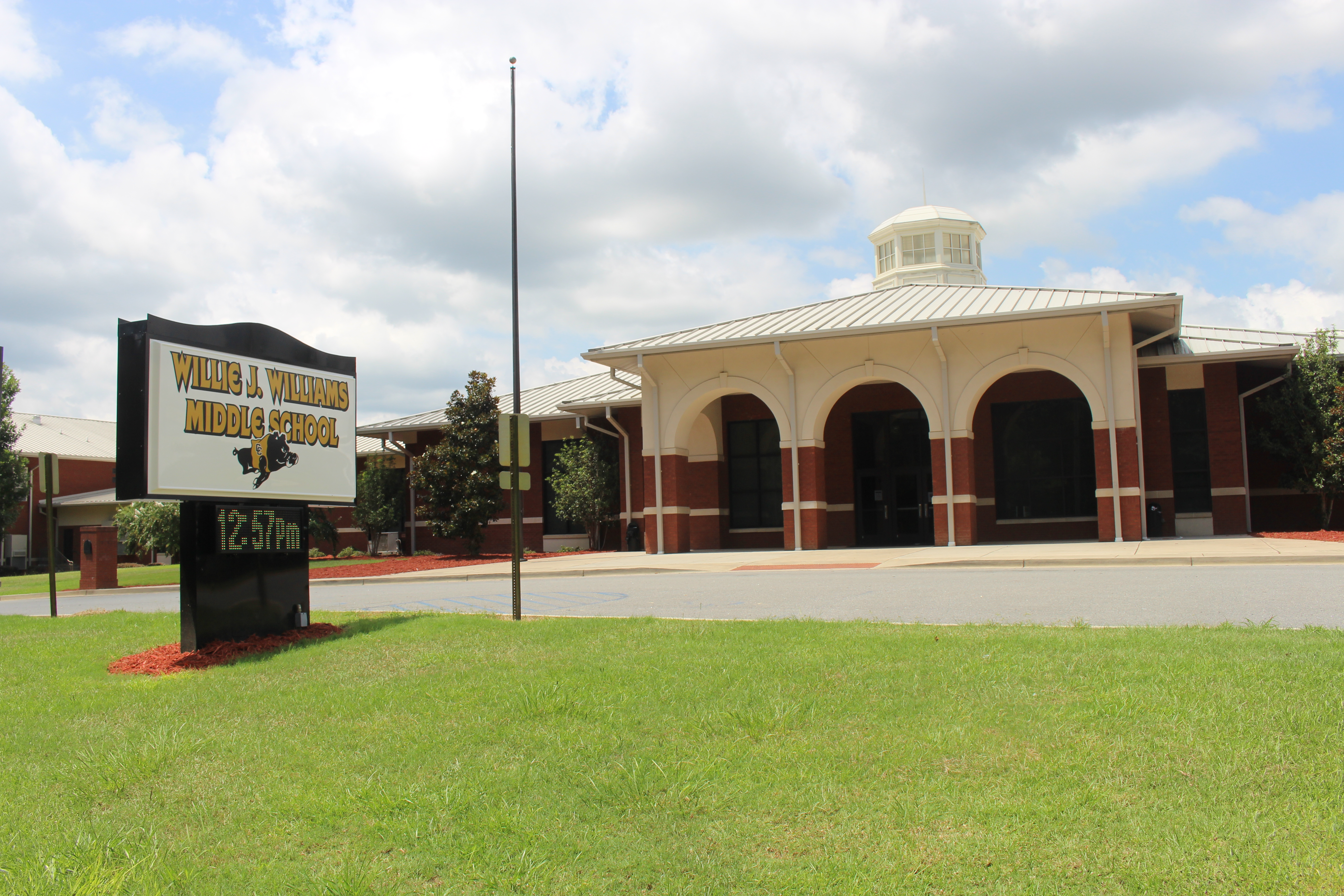
Willie J. Williams Middle School

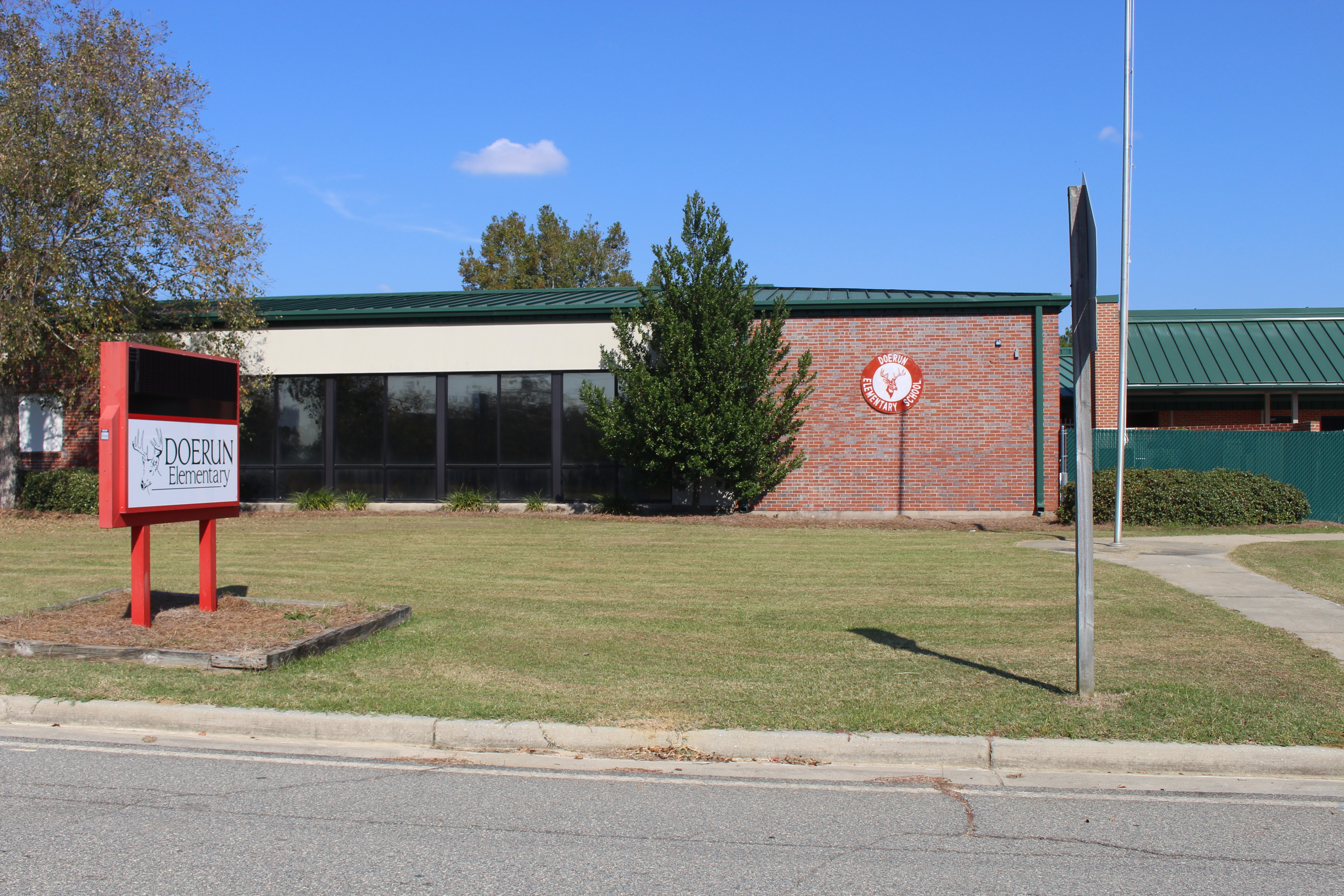
Doerun Elementary School

The Colquitt County School District has eleven elementary schools, two middle schools, and one high school.

=== Elementary schools ===
- Cox Elementary School
- Doerun Elementary School
- Funston Elementary School
- Hamilton Elementary School
- Norman Park Elementary School
- Odom Elementary School
- Okapilco Elementary School
- Stringfellow Elementary School
- Sunset Elementary School
- Wright Elementary School
- Gear Elementary School

=== Middle schools ===
- Willie J. Williams Middle School

=== High school ===
- C.A. Gray Jr High School
- Colquitt County High School is the current school. The former Moultrie High School building, in Moultrie, is listed on the National Register of Historic Places.
