= Omega, Georgia =

- City
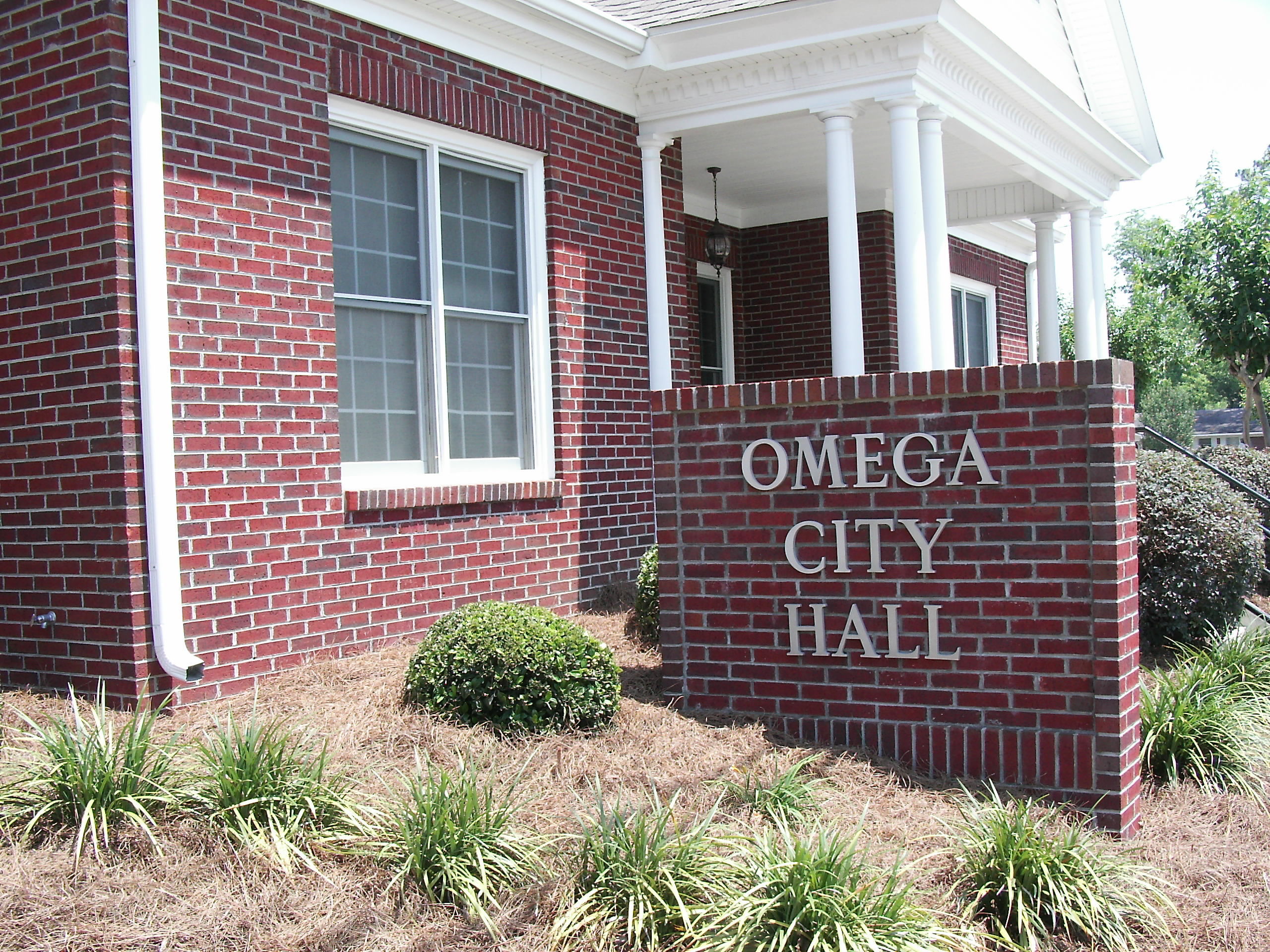
- Omega City Hall

- Location in Tift County and the state of Georgia
- Coordinates: 31°20′23″N 83°35′42″W
- Country: United States
- State: Georgia
- Counties: Tift, Colquitt

Area
  - Total: 1.80 sq mi (4.67 km^{2})
  - Land: 1.78 sq mi (4.62 km^{2})
  - Water: 0.023 sq mi (0.06 km^{2})
- Elevation: 322 ft (98 m)

Population (2020)
  - Total: 1,318
  - Density: 739.2/sq mi (285.42/km^{2})
- Time zone: UTC-5 (Eastern (EST))
  - Summer (DST): UTC-4 (EDT)
- ZIP code: 31775
- Area code: 229
- FIPS code: 13-58184
- GNIS feature ID: 0332576

Omega is a city in Tift and Colquitt counties in the U.S. state of Georgia. The population was 1,318 in 2020.

== History ==
Omega was originally called Surrey, and under the latter name was founded ca. 1889 when the railroad was extended to that point.

Much information about Omega and its citizens can be found in the Omega News, a weekly newspaper published from 1939 to 1980 by W.L. "Bub" Lang. Digitized editions of the newspaper can be accessed on line at https://gahistoricnewspapers.galileo.usg.edu/lccn/sn96069006/

== Geography ==
Omega is located at 31°20′23″N 83°35′42″W (31.339684, -83.595036).

According to the United States Census Bureau, the city has a total area of 1.8 square miles (4.7 km^{2}), of which 1.8 square miles (4.7 km^{2}) is land and 0.56% is water.

== Demographics ==
Historical population
Census	Pop.	Note	%±
1910	274		—
1920	329		20.1%
1930	324		−1.5%
1940	608		87.7%
1950	966		58.9%
1960	940		−2.7%
1970	835		−11.2%
1980	996		19.3%
1990	912		−8.4%
2000	1,340		46.9%
2010	1,221		−8.9%
2020	1,318		7.9%
U.S. Decennial Census; 1850-1870 1870-1880; 1890-1910 1920-1930; 1940 1950 1960; 1970 1980 1990; 2000 2010

=== 2020 census ===
As of the 2020 census, Omega had a population of 1,318. The median age was 30.1 years. 32.9% of residents were under the age of 18 and 9.0% of residents were 65 years of age or older. For every 100 females there were 93.0 males, and for every 100 females age 18 and over there were 92.8 males age 18 and over.

0.0% of residents lived in urban areas, while 100.0% lived in rural areas.

There were 422 households in Omega, of which 47.9% had children under the age of 18 living in them. Of all households, 43.8% were married-couple households, 15.4% were households with a male householder and no spouse or partner present, and 33.9% were households with a female householder and no spouse or partner present. About 20.8% of all households were made up of individuals and 10.7% had someone living alone who was 65 years of age or older.

There were 470 housing units, of which 10.2% were vacant. The homeowner vacancy rate was 0.7% and the rental vacancy rate was 8.9%.

Omega racial composition as of 2020
Race	Num.	Perc.
White (non-Hispanic)	433	32.85%
Black or African American (non-Hispanic)	200	15.17%
Native American	2	0.15%
Asian	7	0.53%
Other/Mixed	25	1.9%
Hispanic or Latino	651	49.39%

=== Demographic estimates ===
Circa 2023 its population was 1,221. 1,209 of those people lived in Tift County, and 12 of them lived in Colquitt County.

== Education ==
All residents of Tift County are in the Tift County School District.

All residents of Colquitt County are in the Colquitt County School District.
