= Colquitt County Courthouse =

- U.S. National Register of Historic Places
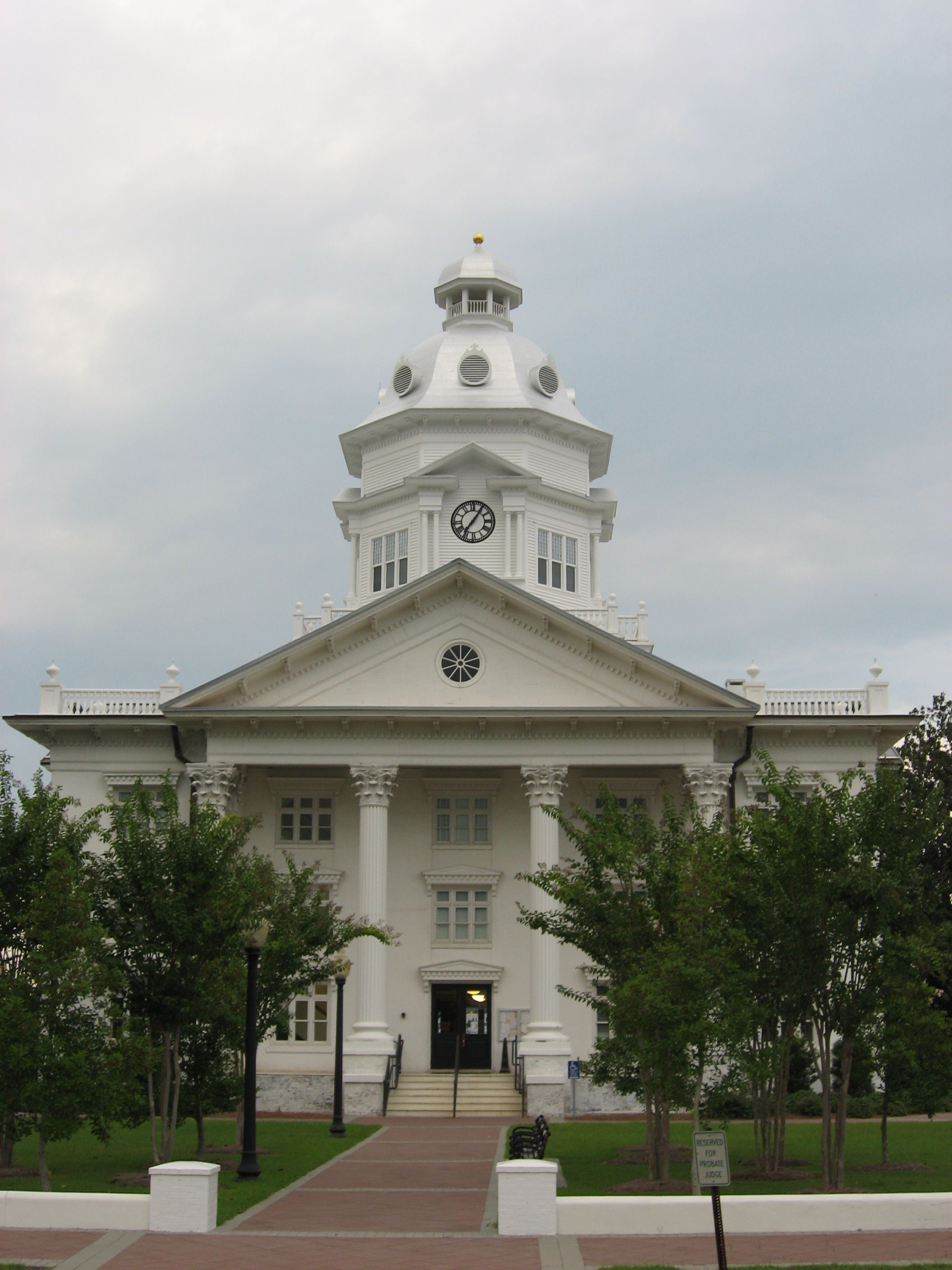

- Location within Georgia Location within the United States
- Interactive map showing the location of Colquitt County Courthouse
- Location: Moultrie, Georgia
- Coordinates: 31°10′45″N 83°47′18″W
- Built: 1902
- Architect: Bryan, A.J. & Co.; Et al.
- Architectural style: Classical Revival
- MPS: Georgia County Courthouses TR
- NRHP reference No.: 80001003
- Added to NRHP: September 18, 1980

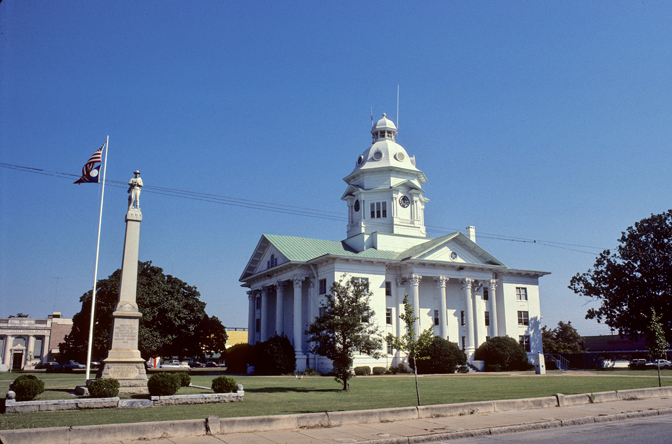
Colquitt County Courthouse

Colquitt County Courthouse is an historic government building constructed in 1902 and located at Courthouse Square in Moultrie, Georgia, the seat of Colquitt County.

The present Colquitt County Courthouse is the third courthouse to serve Colquitt County.

It was added to the National Register of Historic Places on September 18, 1980.

== See also ==
- Moultrie, Georgia
- Colquitt County, Georgia
