= Arthur Alligood =

American folk singer/songwriter

Arthur Alligood is an American folk singer/songwriter from White House, Tennessee. Alligood's music is a blend of folk, americana, roots, & country,

Alligood began singing and playing in the Nashville area in 2005, at which time he released an album, Formerly, on Worship Circle Records. Before taking time off in 2006, he released an independent album "Under the Gray". In 2009 he released an EP, Full Circle.

In 2011 Alligood independently released an album, I Have Not Seen the Wind. The album was produced by Kenny Hutson. The album received mainly positive reviews.

In 2011, Alligood won the Mountain Stage New Song contest. His prize was a fully funded album. The resulting album, produced by Mikal Blue and entitled One Silver Needle, was released in the spring of 2012. One Silver Needle included a cast of musicians including drummer Jim Keltner, bassist Leland Sklar and guitarist Michael Ward. One Silver Needle has received positive reviews, specifically on BBC radio, and some rather lukewarm response as well. On July 15, 2012, One Silver Needle was featured as album of the week on BBC radio Scotland.
