= Norman Park, Georgia =

City in Georgia, United States

- City
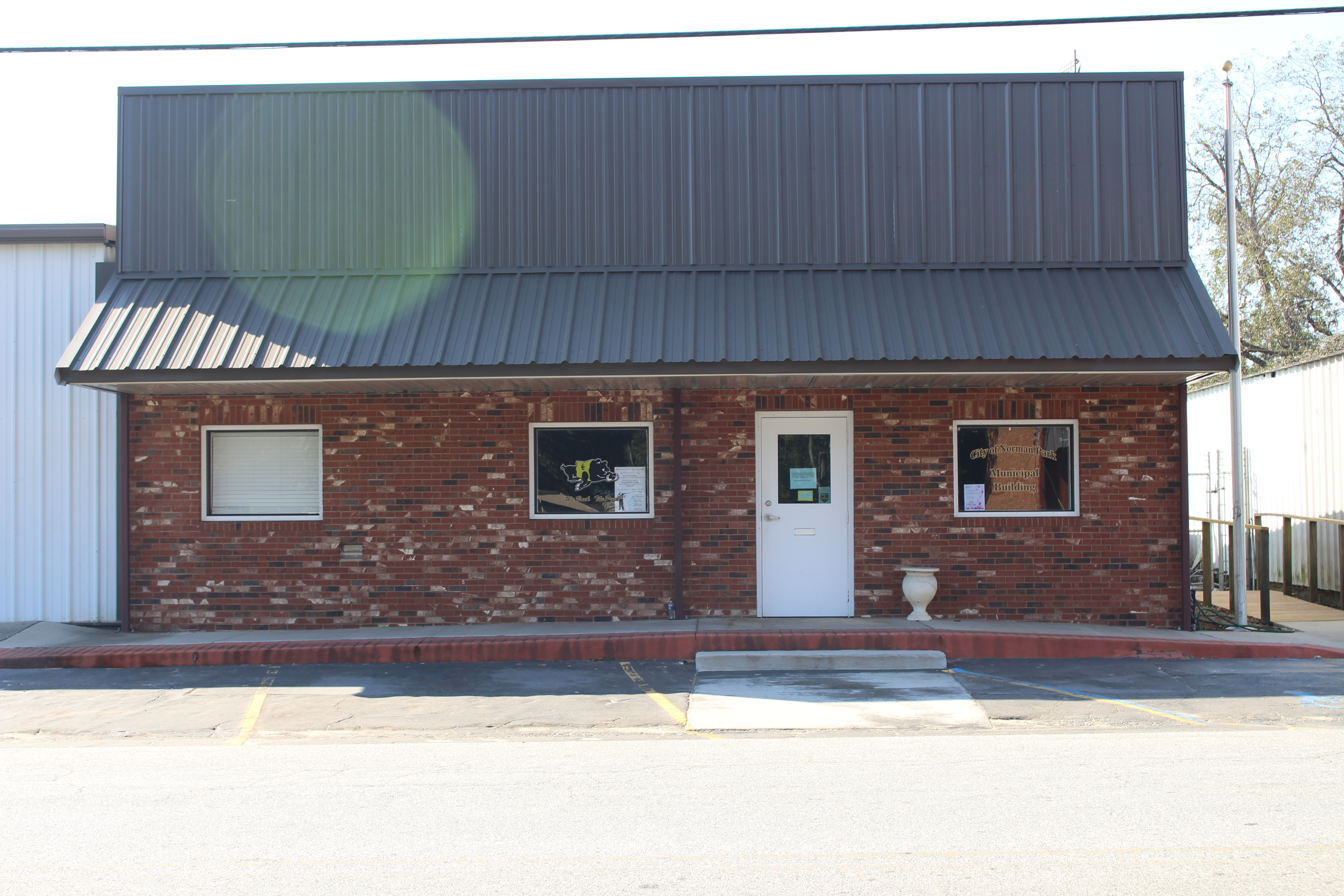
- Norman Park city hall

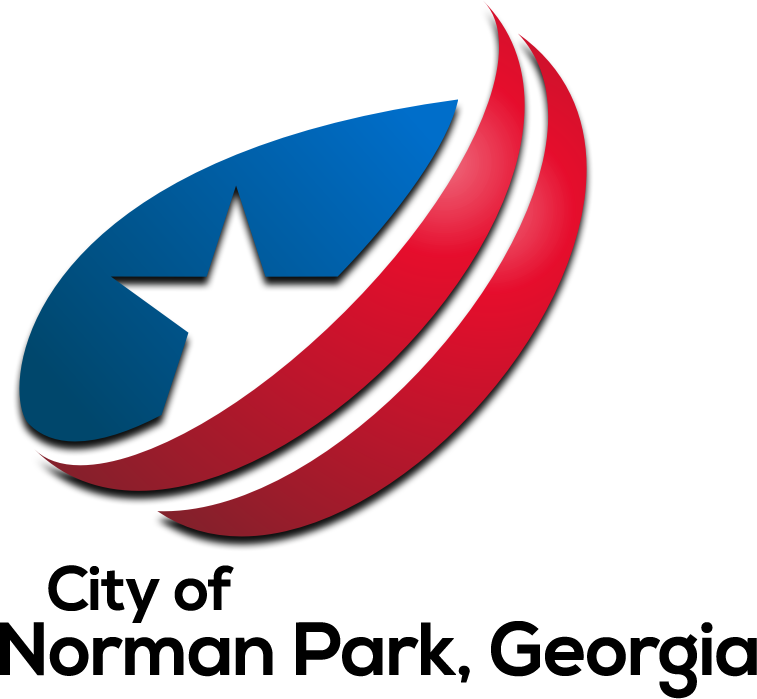
- Logo

- Location in Colquitt County and the state of Georgia
- Coordinates: 31°16′16″N 83°41′3″W
- Country: United States
- State: Georgia
- County: Colquitt

Government
  - Mayor: Bruce Norton

Area
  - Total: 3.14 sq mi (8.12 km^{2})
  - Land: 3.08 sq mi (7.97 km^{2})
  - Water: 0.054 sq mi (0.14 km^{2})
- Elevation: 335 ft (102 m)

Population (2020)
  - Total: 963
  - Density: 312.8/sq mi (120.76/km^{2})
- Time zone: UTC-5 (Eastern (EST))
  - Summer (DST): UTC-4 (EDT)
- ZIP code: 31771
- Area code: 229
- FIPS code: 13-55860
- GNIS feature ID: 0332509
- Website: normanparkga.gov

Norman Park is a city in Colquitt County, Georgia, United States. The population was 963 in 2020.

== History ==
The Georgia General Assembly incorporated Norman Park as a town in 1902. The community was named after J.B. Norman, a founder of the local but now-defunct Norman College.

== Geography ==
Norman Park is located at 31°16′16″N 83°41′3″W (31.271075, -83.684196). According to the United States Census Bureau, the city has a total area of 3.1 square miles (8.0 km^{2}), of which 3.1 square miles (8.0 km^{2}) is land and 0.04 square miles (0.10 km^{2}), or 0.64%, is water.

== Demographics ==
Historical population
| Census | Pop. | Note | %± |
|---|---|---|---|
| 1910 | 648 | | — |
| 1920 | 565 | | −12.8% |
| 1930 | 748 | | 32.4% |
| 1940 | 587 | | −21.5% |
| 1950 | 832 | | 41.7% |
| 1960 | 891 | | 7.1% |
| 1970 | 912 | | 2.4% |
| 1980 | 757 | | −17.0% |
| 1990 | 711 | | −6.1% |
| 2000 | 849 | | 19.4% |
| 2010 | 972 | | 14.5% |
| 2020 | 963 | | −0.9% |
U.S. Decennial Census; 1850-1870 1870-1880; 1890-1910 1920-1930; 1940 1950 1960; 1970 1980 1990; 2000 2010

As of the census of 2000, there were 849 people, 328 households, and 246 families residing in the city. In 2020, its population was 963.

== Education ==
It is a part of the Colquitt County School District and served by Colquitt County High School.There is also a small elementary school nearby called Norman Park elementary school.

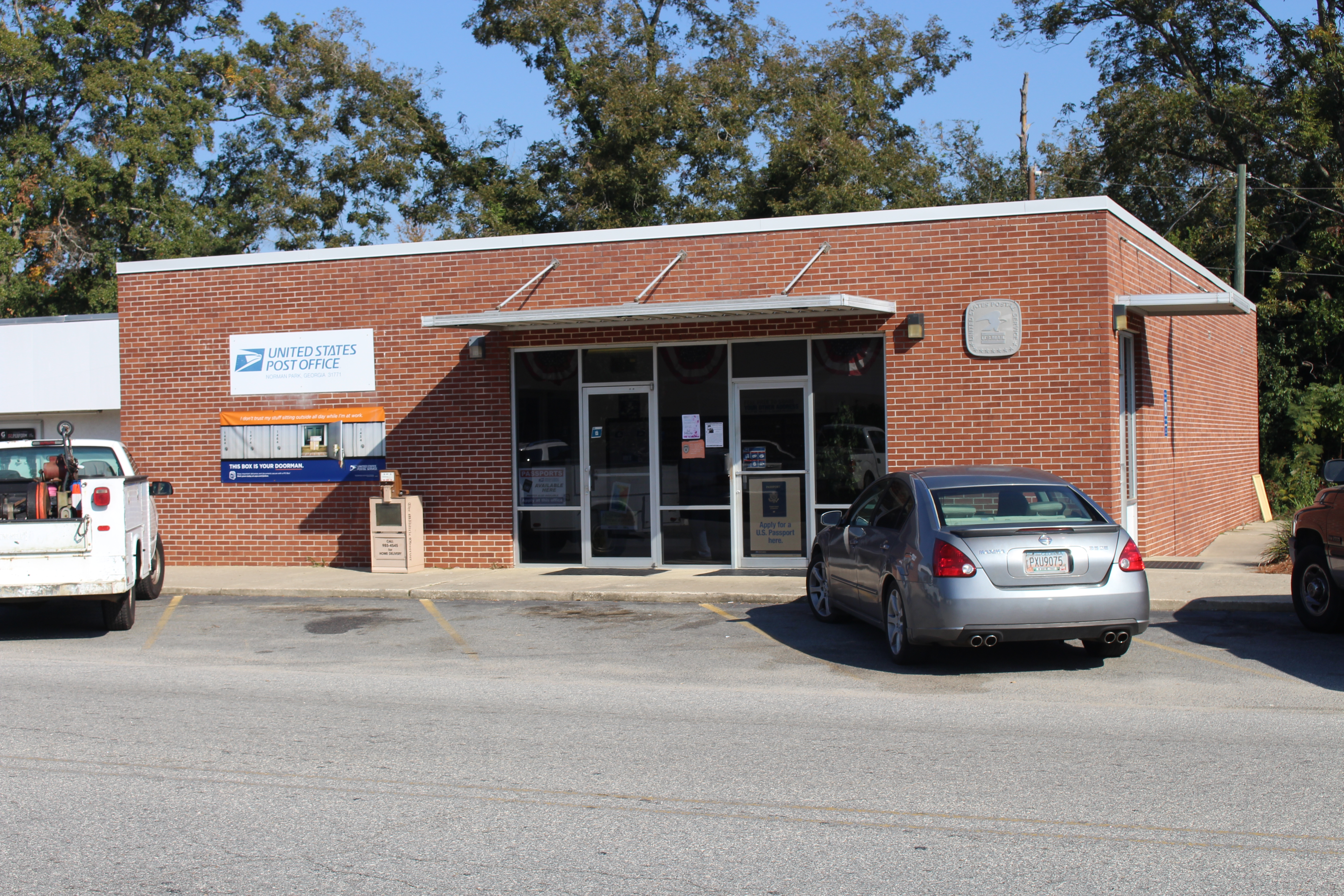
Post Office
