= Bob Alligood =

American politician

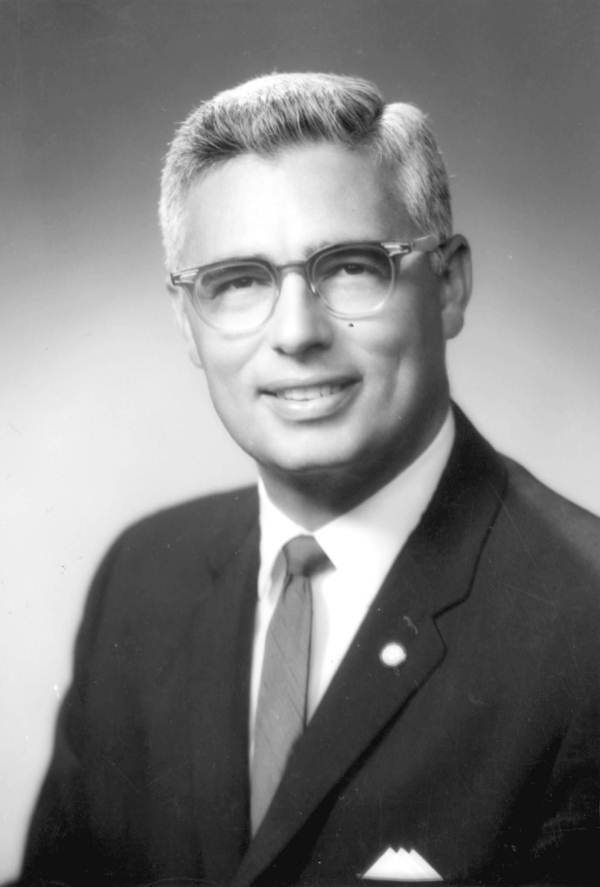

Member of the Florida House of Representatives from Orange County
- In office 1965–1967

Personal details
- Born: December 5, 1932 Mitchell County, Georgia
- Died: April 11, 2023 (aged 90)
- Party: Democratic

Bob Alligood (December 5, 1932 – April 11, 2023) was an American politician in the state of Florida.

Alligood was born in Georgia and came to Florida in 1950. He served in the Florida House of Representatives from 1965 to 1967, as a Democrat, representing Liberty County.
