= WMTM-FM =

Radio station in Moultrie, Georgia

- Moultrie, Georgia; United States
- Broadcast area: Albany-Valdosta, Georgia
- Frequency: 93.9 MHz
- Branding: Cruisin' 94

Programming
- Format: Classic hits

Ownership
- Owner: Colquitt Broadcasting Company, LLC

History
- First air date: 1967

Technical information
- Licensing authority: FCC
- Facility ID: 12381
- Class: C1
- ERP: 100,000 watts
- HAAT: 169 meters (554 ft)
- Transmitter coordinates: 31°12′54.00″N 83°47′13.00″W

Links
- Public license information: Public file; LMS
- Website: cruisin94.com

WMTM-FM (93.9 FM, "Cruisin' 94") is a radio station broadcasting a classic hits music format. Licensed to Moultrie, Georgia, United States, the station is currently owned by Colquitt Broadcasting Company, LLC.
