= Moultrie, Georgia =

City in Georgia, United States

Moultrie
- City
- Moultrie, Georgia
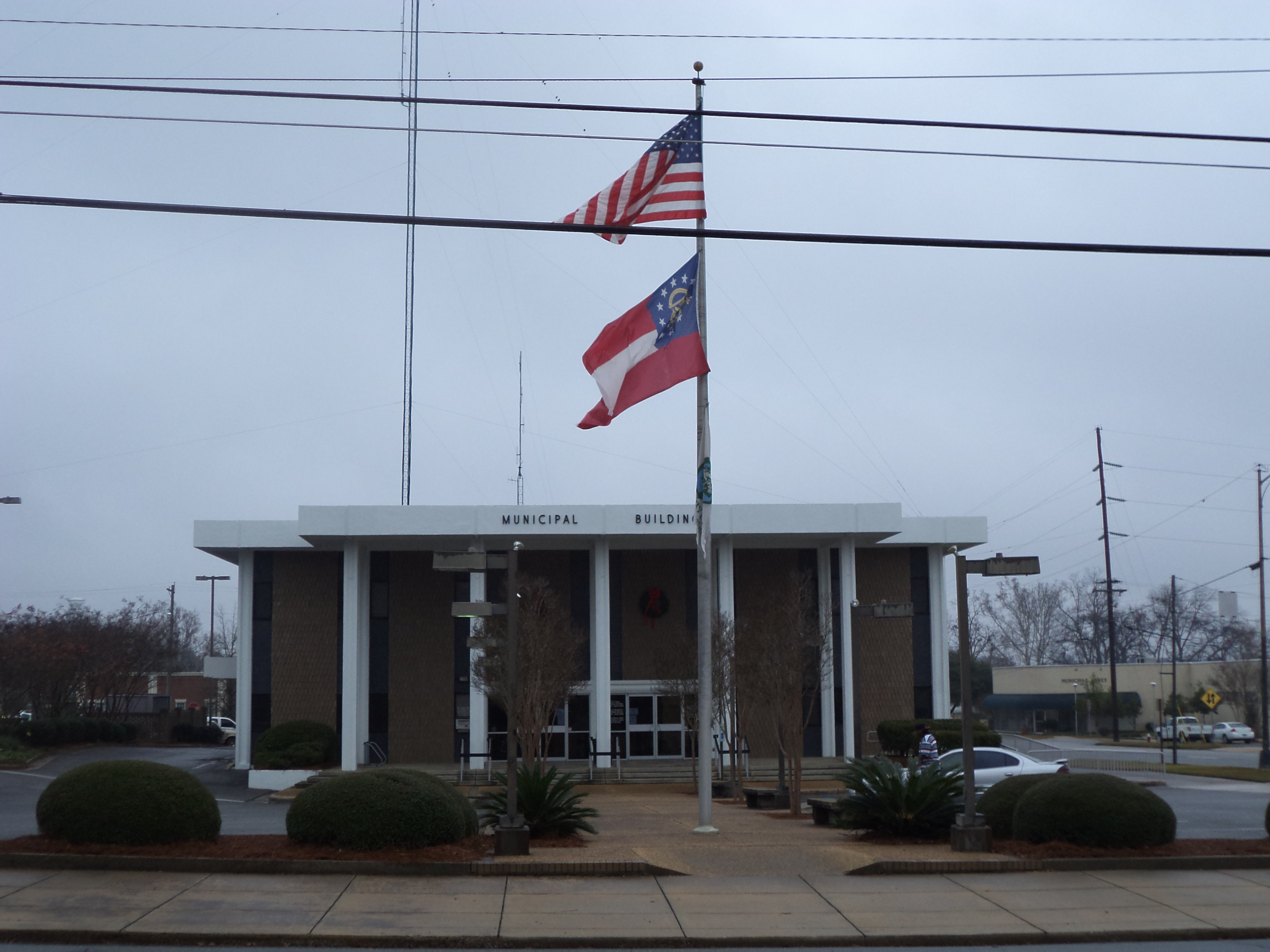
- Moultrie Municipal Building (City Hall)

- Flag Seal
- Nickname: The City of Southern Living
- Location in Colquitt County and the state of Georgia

- Location in Georgia Location in the United States
- Coordinates: 31°10′N 83°47′W
- Country: United States
- State: Georgia
- County: Colquitt
- Established: December 13, 1879

Government
  - Mayor: William M McIntosh (1983–present)

Area
  - Total: 16.84 sq mi (43.61 km^{2})
  - Land: 16.67 sq mi (43.18 km^{2})
  - Water: 0.17 sq mi (0.43 km^{2})
- Elevation: 318 ft (97 m)

Population (2020)
  - Total: 14,638
  - Density: 878.0/sq mi (338.99/km^{2})
- Time zone: UTC-5 (EST)
  - Summer (DST): UTC-4 (EDT)
- ZIP codes: 31768, 31776, 31788
- Area code: 229
- FIPS code: 13-53060
- GNIS feature ID: 0332427
- Website: moultriega.com

Moultrie is the county seat and largest city of Colquitt County, Georgia, United States. It is the third largest city in Southwest Georgia, behind Thomasville and Albany. As of the 2020 census, Moultrie's population was 14,638. It was originally known as Ochlockoney until it was incorporated by the Georgia General Assembly in 1859. Moultrie is an agricultural community set in the Southern Rivers part of Georgia.

Downtown Moultrie contains the Moultrie Commercial Historic District, listed on the National Register of Historic Places. The district includes the Colquitt Theatre.

It is well known for its boutiques and farming industry. Moultrie is the home of former United States Senator Saxby Chambliss.

== History ==
The city was named after Gen. William Moultrie, the Revolutionary War hero after whom Fort Moultrie was named following the successful defense of Charleston, South Carolina, against the British under Peter Parker, an anniversary subsequently celebrated as Carolina Day.

Colquitt County became the 115th county in Georgia by an act of the Legislature on February 25, 1856. It was named after Walter Terry Colquitt, a minister, slave owner, statesman, and lawyer who was a military leader in the mid-1800s. In 1879, a charter was adopted, and 50 acres (0.20 km^{2}) in the center of the county was declared the county seat.

The founders of naval stores started harvesting timber in the late 1890s. They set up turpentine stills and built tram roads, allowing for the railroad to come into the territory. The Boston & Albany line, which later became the Georgia Northern Railway, was the first through town, bringing with it growth and prosperity for the county. Practically every train brought new residents interested in supplying naval stores or working in the sawmills.

By 1900, through the work of businessmen, bankers, and speculators, the county was becoming a farmer's paradise.

Land was cleared, and development companies began dividing the forested area into farm tracts. Experienced farmers from north Georgia and the Carolinas were invited to come and develop the land. The county's agriculture industry thrives today.

The official flag of Moultrie is a rendition of the Moultrie Flag designed by the city's namesake, William Moultrie, during the American Revolutionary War; adopted by resolution of the mayor and council, it consists of a blue field measuring 3 by 5 feet with a white crescent in the upper hoist corner inscribed with the word "Liberty", with an identical design on both sides.

== Geography ==
Located in southwest Georgia, Moultrie is in the center of Colquitt County, 24 miles (39 km) west of Interstate 75, and about 200 miles (300 km) south of Atlanta and 60 miles (100 km) northeast of Tallahassee, Florida. The city is located between Albany to the northwest, Tifton to the northeast, Thomasville to the southwest, and Valdosta to the southeast.

According to the United States Census Bureau, the city has a total area of 16.5 square miles (42.8 km^{2}), of which 16.3 square miles (42.3 km^{2}) is land and 0.19 square miles (0.5 km^{2}), or 1.15%, is water. Moultrie is located at 31°10′13″N 83°47′1″W (31.170188, -83.783601).

=== Climate ===
Moultrie has a humid subtropical climate (Köppen: Cfa) with long, hot summers and short, mild winters.

Climate data for Moultrie (1991–2020, extremes 1898–1911, 1926–present)
| Month | Jan | Feb | Mar | Apr | May | Jun | Jul | Aug | Sep | Oct | Nov | Dec | Year |
|---|---|---|---|---|---|---|---|---|---|---|---|---|---|
| Record high °F (°C) | 87 (31) | 89 (32) | 96 (36) | 100 (38) | 101 (38) | 104 (40) | 105 (41) | 104 (40) | 101 (38) | 97 (36) | 94 (34) | 85 (29) | 105 (41) |
| Mean maximum °F (°C) | 76.9 (24.9) | 79.3 (26.3) | 84.4 (29.1) | 88.2 (31.2) | 93.0 (33.9) | 96.0 (35.6) | 96.9 (36.1) | 96.6 (35.9) | 93.9 (34.4) | 88.6 (31.4) | 82.6 (28.1) | 78.2 (25.7) | 98.1 (36.7) |
| Mean daily maximum °F (°C) | 60.6 (15.9) | 64.4 (18.0) | 70.7 (21.5) | 77.2 (25.1) | 84.2 (29.0) | 88.6 (31.4) | 90.2 (32.3) | 89.2 (31.8) | 85.6 (29.8) | 78.0 (25.6) | 68.9 (20.5) | 62.9 (17.2) | 76.7 (24.8) |
| Daily mean °F (°C) | 49.9 (9.9) | 53.6 (12.0) | 59.3 (15.2) | 65.5 (18.6) | 73.1 (22.8) | 78.9 (26.1) | 80.8 (27.1) | 80.3 (26.8) | 76.3 (24.6) | 67.6 (19.8) | 58.0 (14.4) | 52.3 (11.3) | 66.3 (19.1) |
| Mean daily minimum °F (°C) | 39.3 (4.1) | 42.9 (6.1) | 47.9 (8.8) | 53.9 (12.2) | 62.1 (16.7) | 69.2 (20.7) | 71.4 (21.9) | 71.5 (21.9) | 67.0 (19.4) | 57.2 (14.0) | 47.0 (8.3) | 42.0 (5.6) | 56.0 (13.3) |
| Mean minimum °F (°C) | 23.3 (−4.8) | 27.7 (−2.4) | 32.7 (0.4) | 40.3 (4.6) | 50.5 (10.3) | 61.8 (16.6) | 66.9 (19.4) | 65.8 (18.8) | 56.8 (13.8) | 40.9 (4.9) | 32.2 (0.1) | 27.8 (−2.3) | 21.6 (−5.8) |
| Record low °F (°C) | 0 (−18) | 1 (−17) | 17 (−8) | 28 (−2) | 41 (5) | 50 (10) | 59 (15) | 55 (13) | 41 (5) | 30 (−1) | 15 (−9) | 8 (−13) | 0 (−18) |
| Average precipitation inches (mm) | 4.77 (121) | 4.29 (109) | 5.19 (132) | 3.54 (90) | 2.67 (68) | 5.68 (144) | 5.50 (140) | 4.57 (116) | 4.42 (112) | 2.92 (74) | 2.86 (73) | 3.59 (91) | 50 (1,270) |
| Average precipitation days (≥ 0.1 in) | 6.3 | 5.2 | 5.3 | 4.5 | 4.4 | 8.4 | 8.6 | 8.4 | 5.0 | 3.3 | 3.8 | 5.2 | 68.4 |
Source: NOAA

== Demographics ==
Historical population
| Census | Pop. | Note | %± |
|---|---|---|---|
| 1900 | 2,221 | | — |
| 1910 | 3,349 | | 50.8% |
| 1920 | 6,789 | | 102.7% |
| 1930 | 8,027 | | 18.2% |
| 1940 | 10,147 | | 26.4% |
| 1950 | 11,639 | | 14.7% |
| 1960 | 15,764 | | 35.4% |
| 1970 | 14,400 | | −8.7% |
| 1980 | 15,105 | | 4.9% |
| 1990 | 14,865 | | −1.6% |
| 2000 | 14,387 | | −3.2% |
| 2010 | 14,268 | | −0.8% |
| 2020 | 14,638 | | 2.6% |
U.S. Decennial Census; 1850-1870 1870-1880; 1890-1910 1920-1930; 1940 1950 1960; 1970 1980 1990; 2000 2010

=== 2020 census ===
As of the 2020 census, Moultrie had a population of 14,638. There were 2,988 families residing in the city. The median age was 37.5 years. 25.0% of residents were under the age of 18 and 17.1% of residents were 65 years of age or older. For every 100 females there were 90.3 males, and for every 100 females age 18 and over there were 86.1 males age 18 and over.

94.5% of residents lived in urban areas, while 5.5% lived in rural areas.

There were 5,831 households in Moultrie, of which 31.7% had children under the age of 18 living in them. Of all households, 29.9% were married-couple households, 21.8% were households with a male householder and no spouse or partner present, and 43.0% were households with a female householder and no spouse or partner present. About 34.6% of all households were made up of individuals and 15.2% had someone living alone who was 65 years of age or older.

There were 6,577 housing units, of which 11.3% were vacant. The homeowner vacancy rate was 2.4% and the rental vacancy rate was 6.2%.

Racial composition as of the 2020 census
| Race | Number | Percent |
|---|---|---|
| White | 5,892 | 40.3% |
| Black or African American | 6,687 | 45.7% |
| American Indian and Alaska Native | 108 | 0.7% |
| Asian | 130 | 0.9% |
| Native Hawaiian and Other Pacific Islander | 4 | 0.0% |
| Some other race | 940 | 6.4% |
| Two or more races | 877 | 6.0% |
| Hispanic or Latino (of any race) | 1,963 | 13.4% |

== Education ==
=== Colquitt County School District ===
Moultrie public schools are controlled by the Colquitt County Board of Education. The Colquitt County School District holds grades pre-school to grade twelve, consisting of ten elementary schools, a middle school, a junior high school, and one high school. As of November 27, 2020, the district had more than 9,100 students and 1,351 staff, which includes both certified and classified staff.

Elementary schools

- Cox Elementary School
- Doerun Elementary School
- Funston Elementary School
- G.E.A.R. Gifted Center
- Hamilton Elementary School
- Norman Park Elementary School
- Odom Elementary School
- Okapilco Elementary School
- Stringfellow Elementary School
- Sunset Elementary School
- Wright Elementary School
- Pre-K Program

Middle schools

- Williams Middle School

Junior high schools

- C. A. Gray Junior High School

High schools

- Colquitt County High School

Alternative schools

- Colquitt County Achievement Center

=== Private schools ===
Colquitt County also has a small, private Christian School, Colquitt Christian Academy, which is located at Calvary Baptist Church.

=== Higher education ===
- Southern Regional Technical College – Main Campus
- Abraham Baldwin Agricultural College – Moultrie Campus
- Philadelphia College of Osteopathic Medicine – South Georgia Campus. PCOM South Georgia opened in August 2019, offering a Doctor of Osteopathic Medicine (DO) degree, and added a Master of Science in Biomedical Sciences in the fall of 2020.

== Industry ==
Industry in the Moultrie area grew considerably when Sanderson Farms opened a processing plant in 2006 that now employs over 1,000 workers, over 10 percent of the local workforce. The manufacturer of light, single-engined STOL aircraft, the Maule Air, is also located in Moultrie.

== Telecommunications ==
There are three radio channels and three television stations located in Moultrie.

- Radio
  - WMTM-1300 AM News/Talk
  - WMTM-93.9 FM Oldies Cruisin' 94
  - WWGW-LP 102.5 FM
- Television
  - WSWG CBS TV'
  - CW44 CW TV
  - WSWG2 My Network TV

== Historic sites ==
Moultrie is home to several sites on the National Register of Historic Places listings in Colquitt County, Georgia of the National Register of Historic Places.

== Points of interest ==
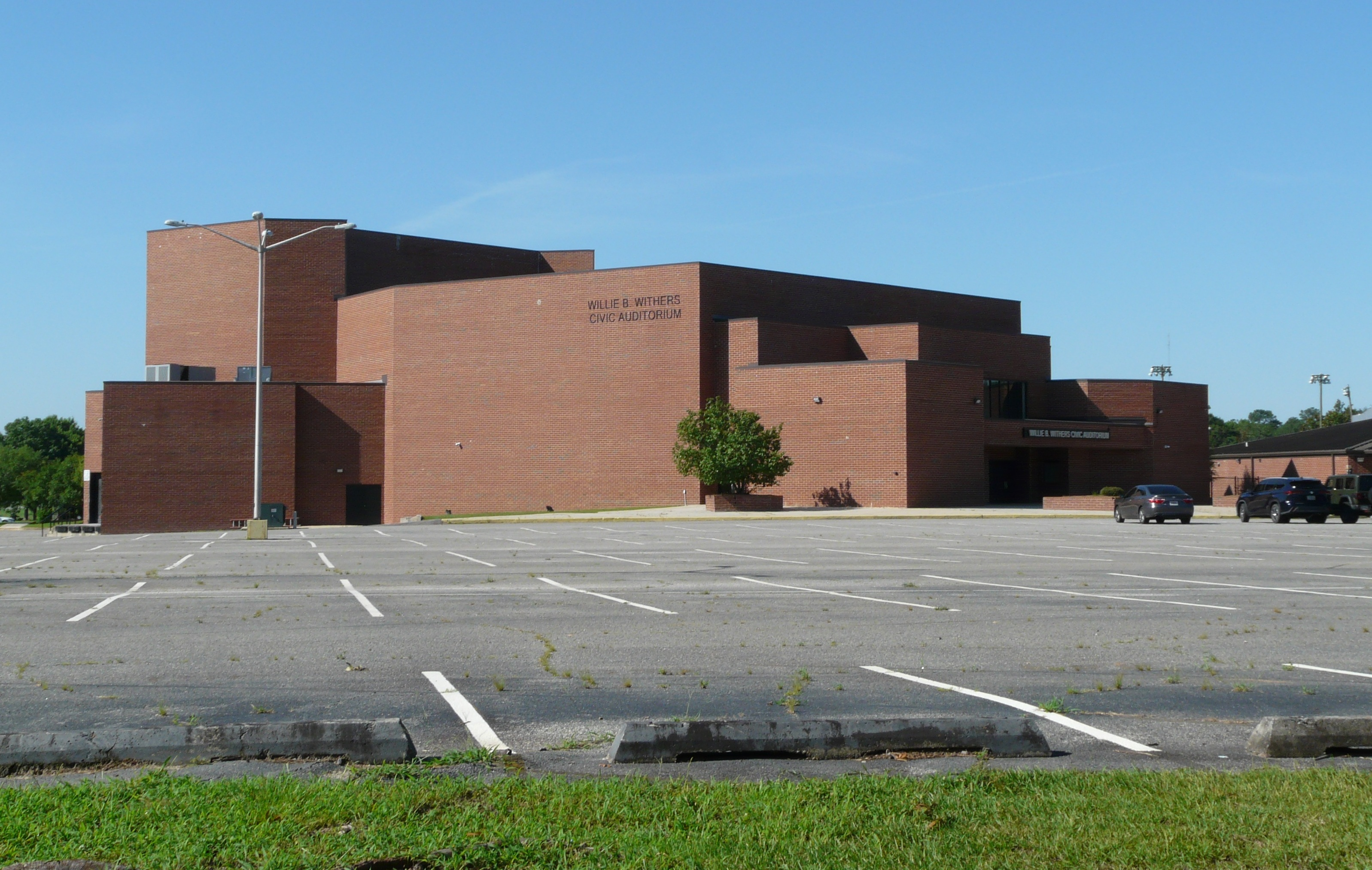
The Willie B Withers Civic Auditorium

- Museum of Colquitt County History
- Reed Bingham State Park – offers camping, hiking, fishing, birding, and boating on a 375-acre lake. Wildlife includes bald eagles, alligators, and gopher tortoises.
- Ellen Payne Odom Genealogy Library
- Spence Field
- Colquitt County Arts Center – home to permanent collections, theatre groups, concerts, art education, and the Fall Quilt Exhibition
- Tom White Linear Park – a 7.5-mile "Rails to Trails" project, for walkers and cycle enthusiasts
- St. Mark's Anglican Church

== Transportation ==
Moultrie is served by US 319, which connects to Interstate 75 and Interstate 10. State Road 37 and State Road 111 also run through Moultrie. Moultrie has two public airports used primarily for general aviation, Moultrie Municipal Airport and Spence Airport.
