= KLHW =

KLHW may refer to:

- MidCoast Regional Airport at Wright Army Airfield (ICAO code)
- KLHW-LP, a low-power radio station (90.5 FM) licensed to serve Kansas City, Missouri, United States
