= VDI =

VDI may refer to:

- Verein Deutscher Ingenieure, the Association of German Engineers
- Vidalia Regional Airport (IATA code: VDI)
- Vietnam Defence Industry, Vietnam's General Department of Defense Industry.

== Technology ==
- Virtual Desktop Infrastructure, a Citrix/Microsoft desktop virtualization engine
- VDI (file format), the virtual disk image file used in VirtualBox systems
- Virtual Device Interface, a component of Digital Research's Graphics Environment Manager (GEM)
