= Bush Field =

Bush Field may refer to:

- Bush Field (Yale), a baseball stadium
- Augusta Regional Airport, an airport in Georgia, United States
