= LHW =

LHW may refer to:

- Lanzhou Zhongchuan International Airport, serving Lanzhou, Gansu, China
- The Leading Hotels of the World, an American hotel affiliation group
- Light heavyweight, a weight class in boxing
- Light heavyweight (MMA), a weight class in mixed martial arts
- MidCoast Regional Airport at Wright Army Airfield, in Georgia, United States
