= Augusta Regional Airport =

Public airport in Richmond County, Georgia, US

Augusta Regional Airport at Bush Field

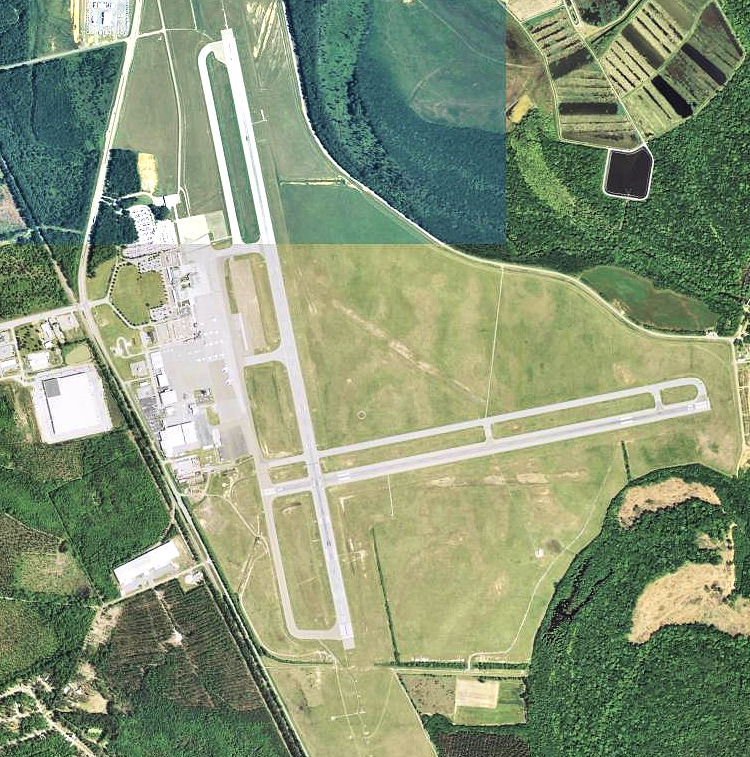
- 2006 USGS airphoto
- IATA: AGS; ICAO: KAGS; FAA LID: AGS

Summary
- Airport type: Public
- Owner: City of Augusta
- Serves: Augusta, Georgia
- Elevation AMSL: 144 ft (44 m)
- Coordinates: 33°22′12″N 81°57′52″W
- Website: Flyags.com

Map
- Location of airport in Georgia AGS (the United States)

Runways
Direction	Length		Surface
Direction	ft	m	Surface
17/35	8,001	2,439	Asphalt
8/26	6,002	1,829	Asphalt

Statistics (2023)
- Passengers: 586,558
- Aircraft operations: 41,707
- Based aircraft: 18
- Source: Airport Activity Report, Federal Aviation Administration

Augusta Regional Airport (Augusta Regional Airport at Bush Field) (IATA: AGS, ICAO: KAGS, FAA LID: AGS) is a city-owned public airport six miles (11 km) south of Augusta, in Richmond County, Georgia, United States.

In 2000, Bush Field Airport changed its name to Augusta Regional Airport. The airport opened a new passenger terminal in December 2007 and renovated the entire property, designed by the LPA Group. In 2008, the airport adopted the marketing slogan ‘Fly There, Fly Home’ in a campaign emphasizing convenient regional connections.

== Facilities and aircraft ==
Augusta Regional Airport covers 1,411 acres (571 ha) at an elevation of 144 feet (44 m) above mean sea level. It has one concrete and one asphalt runway: 17/35, 8,001 × 150 feet (2,439 × 46 m) and 8/26, 6,002 × 75 feet (1,829 × 23 m).

In the year ending July 31, 2022, the Augusta Regional Airport had 42,038 aircraft operations, an average of 115 per day: 49% general aviation, 19% air taxi, 16% military and 17% scheduled commercial. 18 aircraft were then based at this airport: 5 single-engine, 7 multi-engine, 4 jet and 2 helicopters.

=== Commercial aircraft ===
In early 2008, a typical day saw seven departures to Atlanta, GA on Bombardier CRJ-200 regional jets and ATR 72 turboprop aircraft by Delta Connection carriers, US Airways Express had seven departures to Charlotte, NC with turboprop Bombardier Dash 8-300s and Bombardier CRJ-200s. As of mid-2009, Delta Air Lines regional carrier Atlantic Southeast Airlines (ASA) no longer operates the ATR-72 turboprop aircraft, and all ExpressJet flights into and out of Augusta are 50-seat CRJ-200 regional jets. US Airways Express served the airport with Dash 8-300 turboprops and CRJ-200s. American Eagle suspended service to Augusta on January 31, 2012. Following the merger of American Airlines and US Airways in December 2013, American Eagle reinstated flights to Augusta on June 2, 2015.

Delta Air Lines resumed service at Augusta in May 2011, deploying Boeing 717-200 aircraft on daily round trips to its Atlanta hub, after having withdrawn mainline flights in 2000.

During the Masters golf tournament each April, weekly enplanements increase by approximately 60 percent, and airlines schedule additional service, including Delta Air Lines Boeing 737 and 757 aircraft to accommodate demand. Airlines respond with more flights on larger equipment, including Delta Air Lines Boeing 737s and 757s. During 2009 Masters week, Embraer E-170s and CRJ-900s were common, but larger aircraft were also sent to Augusta. Delta does operate mainline aircraft to Augusta on a daily basis from their hub in nearby Atlanta.

The presence of Fort Gordon in Augusta results in periodic military charter flights using widebody aircraft such as McDonnell Douglas DC-10 and McDonnell Douglas MD-11 trijet aircraft, in the past operated by World Airways.

== History ==
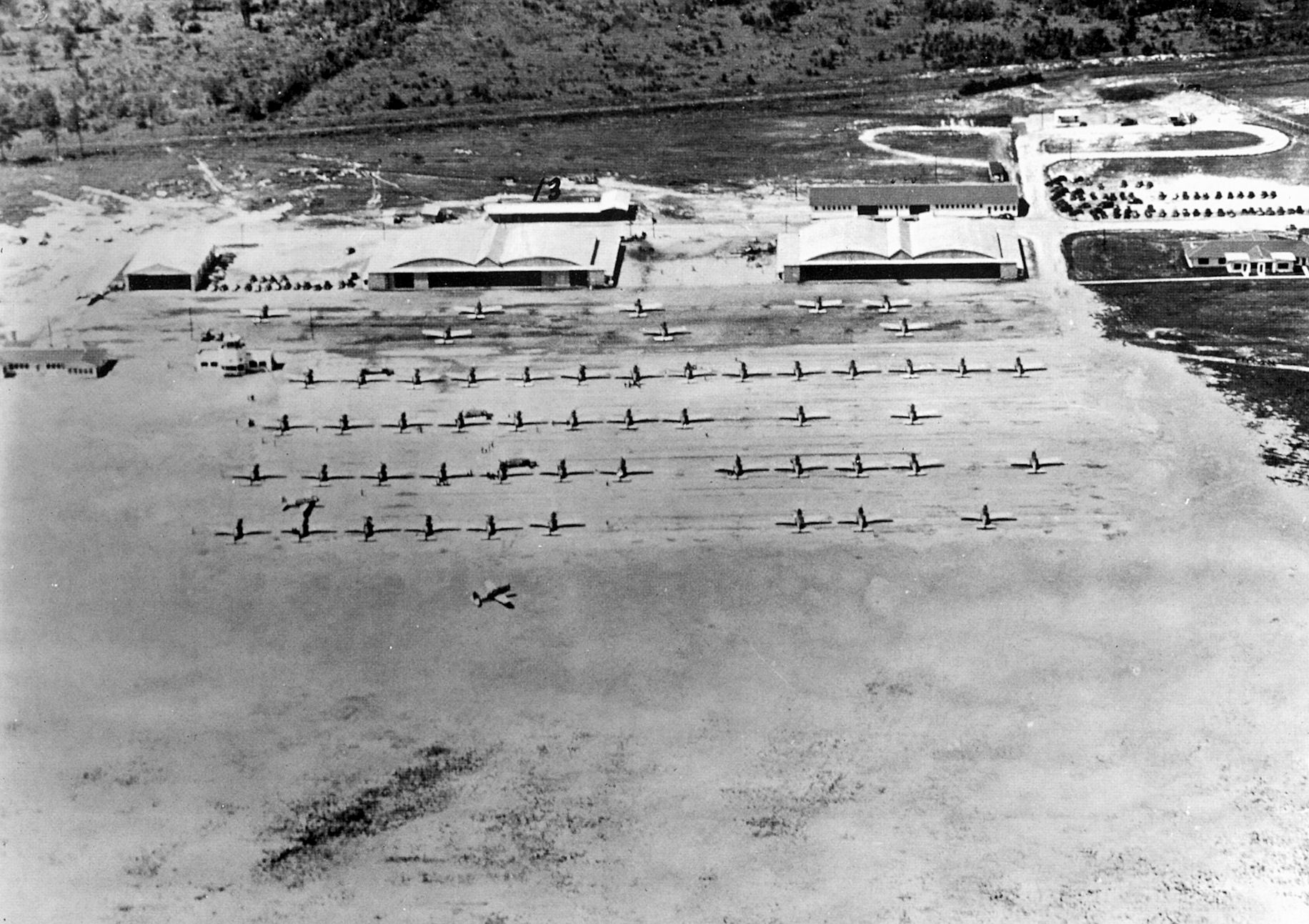
Training aircraft and hangars at Bush Field, about 1943

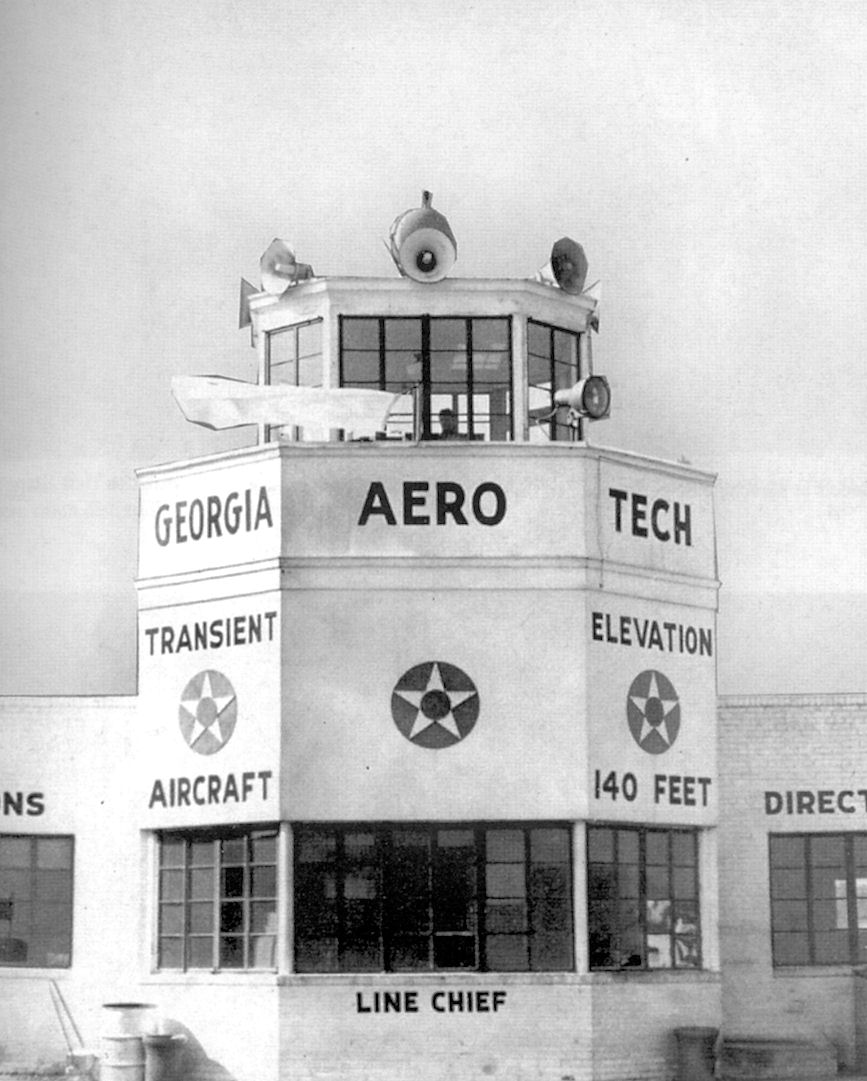
Control tower at Bush Field

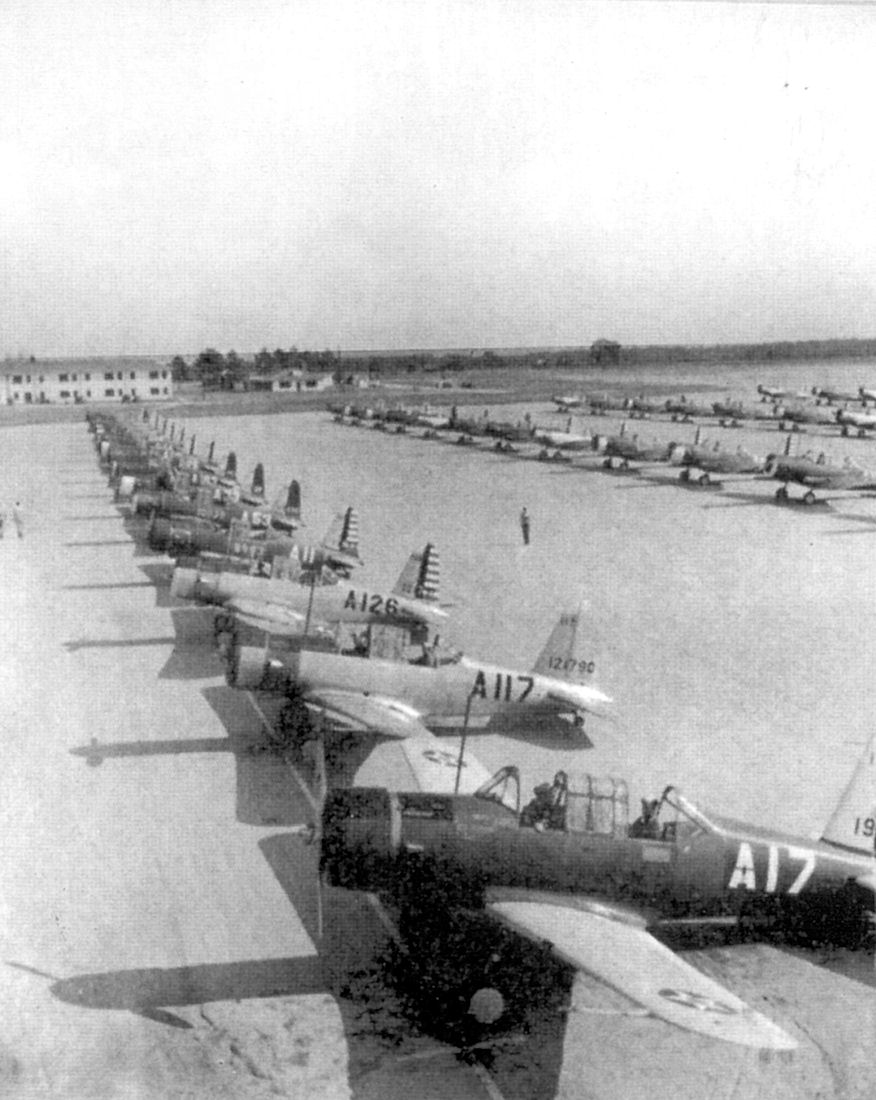
Vultee BT-13 and BT-15s at Bush Field. The initial "A"s on the fuselages were assigned for Bush Field aircraft.

=== Origins ===
In 1941, the City of Augusta learned that the United States Army Air Corps was looking for a site to locate a basic Contract Pilot School. In March 1941, the president of the Chamber of commerce contacted Harold S. Darr, who operated a primary flight school for the Air Corps in Albany (Albany Army Airfield) to promote the idea to locate the new school in the Augusta area. With the Army's approval, Darr chose a 900-acre (3.6 km^{2}) tract 7.5 miles (12.1 km) southeast of the City adjacent to the Savannah River. On March 22, 1941, Darr entered into an agreement with local officials to invest $500,000 in buying the acreage and building a school. Darr estimated that the school would employ 300 civilians with an annual payroll of $1.5 million, In turn, the City and Richmond County agreed to move a City-owned hangar from nearby Daniel Field, pave the aircraft parking ramp, pave a road in the area to create a runway, and provide convict labor with guards. The Air Corps set a very ambitious timetable by requiring that flight training begin no later than June 7, 1941. Construction started on April 1. The Air Corps and Darr did not go public with the project until April 5, when an announcement appeared in the local newspaper.

=== World War II ===
Training began on June 10, with flying cadets arriving from the Air Corps primary schools at Albany and Americus, Tuscaloosa, Alabama, Camden, South Carolina, Arcadia and Lakeland, Florida. The initial aircraft complement numbered 24 Vultee BT-13 Valiant and BT-15 aircraft. The ten-week course consisted of 70 hours of flight training and 150 hours of ground training. Harold Darr named the school Georgia Aero Tech; however, the Army designated it the 72nd Army Air Force Flight Training Detachment. The school was one of only three contract pilot schools conducting basic training. In addition to the main school at Augusta, the following auxiliary airfields were utilized:

- Dionne Auxiliary Field 33°05′50″N 81°57′59″W
- Yawn Auxiliary Field 33°11′58″N 82°03′46″W

Shortly after flight training commenced in June 1941, Don C. Bush, a civilian flight instructor, lost his life in an aircraft crash. The airfield was named Bush Field in his memory.

In January 1942, the Defense Plant Corporation, a corporation entity of the Federal government, bought the school from Harold Darr. With the United States now in the war, the size of the classes increased, requiring an expansion of the school's facilities. Construction began on a ground training building in May and an additional barracks in June. The number of aircraft assigned to the school grew from 24 to around 100 BT-13s and BT-15s. Additional paved runways were eventually added.

During all 1943, the school operated at capacity with classes averaging around 160 students. By early 1944, training requirements began to decrease, and with the possibility at that time of closing nearby Camp Gordon, the Army suddenly had no use for the field. In September 1944, the Air Force closed the facility after training over 5,000 students.

The Reconstruction Finance Corporation used Bush Field until 1948 for the disposal and sale of surplus military aircraft. The surplus aircraft at Bush included almost every Army and Navy model, from primary trainers and drones to B-24s and large transports. Several were purchased by the upstart Flying Tiger Airline.

=== Commercial use ===
Bush Field became Augusta's commercial airport on July 1, 1950, when the Federal Government transferred Bush Field to the City of Augusta and the airlines moved from Daniel Field to Bush Field. One of the airport's most profitable initiatives occurred in 1955 when a transient terminal was opened to sell fuel and to provide service to visiting aircraft. To this day, the fueling operation continues as a major source of revenue for the airport, keeping it self-sufficient and profitable. No tax dollars or City funding has ever been needed to support the airport.

During the 1950s and 1960s passenger traffic grew. The old flight school barracks were renovated and leased to Continental Hotels. In 1961, an 8,000 ft (2,400 m) runway was completed. In 1964, Bush Field was the 135th-busiest airport in the nation. Jet service at the airport began in 1965. By the close of the 1960s, the airport had doubled its baggage claim area and added a terminal, a tower, a lobby, a hotel, parking meters, and a second runway.

The 1970s saw the airport's industrial growth period. During the 1970s, Capitol Aviation of Georgia (not to be confused with Capitol Air) established itself at the airport with a million-dollar-plus airplane service facility. The company, now known as Landmark Aviation, developed a jet engine repair facility, an avionics-navigation shop, and a structural and aircraft systems repair shop. Landmark Aviation now employs roughly 220 people at the Augusta facility.

By the 1990s, Bush Field tenants and visitors were contributing about $290 million in annual economic activity with nearly 2,200 jobs attributed to the airport. In 2000, Bush Field was renamed Augusta Regional Airport at Bush Field.

The self-sufficient airport, which has never used tax dollars, completed the first-ever "Master Plan" in 2002. The Master Plan serves as a road map for future economic growth and development at and around the airport.

Several former World War II buildings of Georgia Aero Tech remain at Bush Field. The former mess hall, administration building, and ground school buildings formed part of the airport's terminal building. The original swimming pool remained until 2008, but with a hotel built around it rather than cadet barracks. The hotel, pool, and terminal buildings were demolished in conjunction with the building of an entirely new terminal building. The FAA currently occupies the former Link trainer building. All the hangars are still in use – including the one moved from Daniel Field in 1941.

The airport’s Aircraft Rescue and Firefighting (ARFF) unit operates continuous coverage in compliance with FAA Part 139 requirements.

In 2021, Augusta Regional Airport became the home of Augusta University Health's AirCare program. The air ambulance service through Metro Aviation provides medical transport services to Augusta University Medical Center from on-scene responses and from transportation to and from other medical facilities.

== Airlines and destinations ==
=== Passenger ===
Airlines	Destinations
American Eagle	Charlotte, Dallas/Fort Worth, Washington–National
Delta Air Lines	Atlanta
Delta Connection	Atlanta

Destinations map
Destinations from Augusta Regional Airport
Red = Year-round destination
Blue = Future destination

=== Top destinations ===
Busiest domestic routes from Augusta Regional at Bush Field (December 2023 – November 2024)
Rank	City	Passengers
1	Atlanta, Georgia	144,940
2	Charlotte, North Carolina	101,160
3	Dallas/Fort Worth, Texas	23,850
4	Washington (Reagan), DC	16,520
5	New York (LaGuardia), New York	1,980
6	Philadelphia, Pennsylvania	840
7	Boston, Massachusetts	800
8	Detroit, Michigan	630
7	Miami, Florida	580

== See also ==
- Georgia World War II Army Airfields
- List of airports in Georgia (U.S. state)
- 27th Flying Training Wing (World War II)
