= Bainbridge Air Base =

Former US military base in Georgia

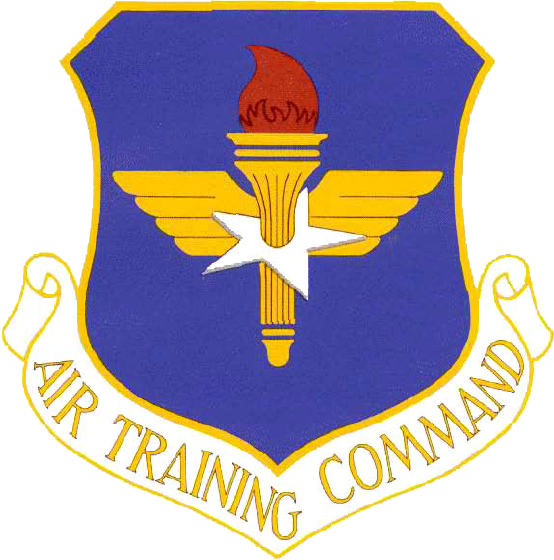
Bainbridge Air Base Bainbridge Army Airfield
- Part of Air Training Command
- Located near: Bainbridge, Georgia
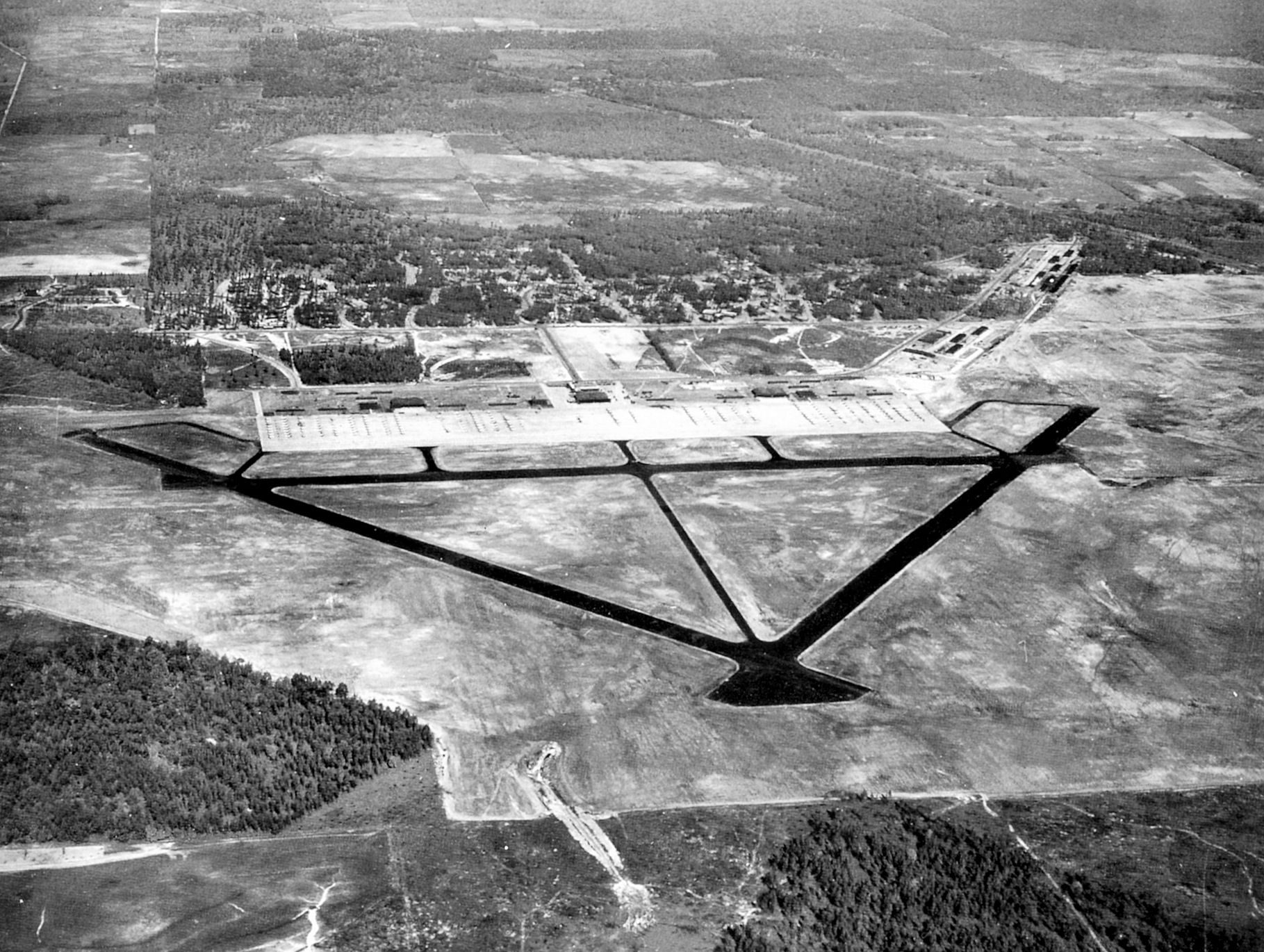
- Bainbridge Army Airfield, Georgia, 1944

Site information
- Controlled by: United States Air Force

Location
- Location within Georgia
- Coordinates: 30°58′18″N 84°38′15″W

Site history
- Built: 1942
- In use: 1942–1945, 1951–1961

Bainbridge Air Base is a closed United States Air Force base. It was inactivated on 31 March 1961.

== History ==
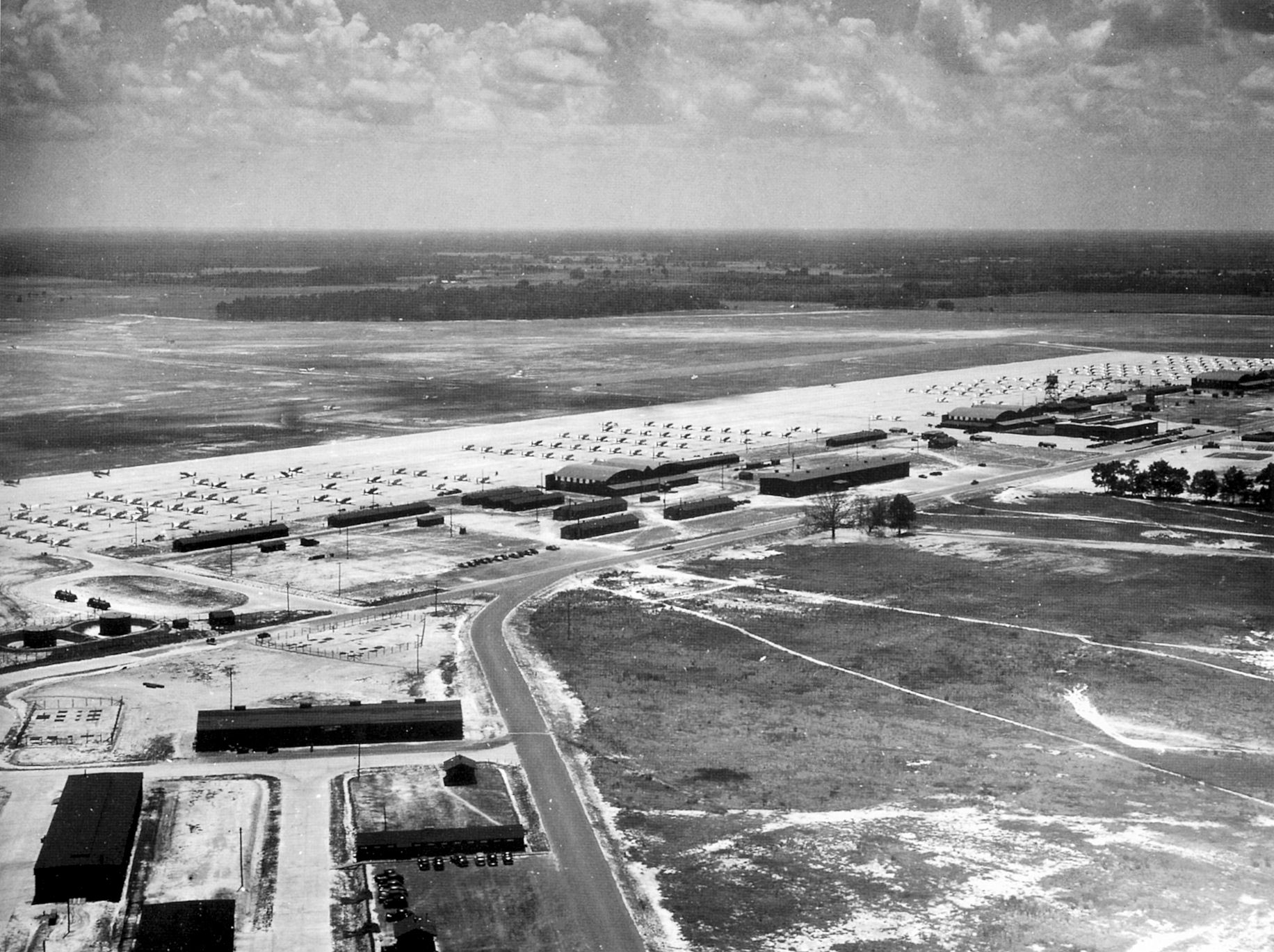
Flightline of Bainbridge Army Airfield, Georgia, 1944

Following entry of the United States into World War II, the Chief of the Army Air Corps directed the Air Corps Flying Training Command Southeast Training Center to immediately take action to select air base sites needed to increase its pilot training rate to meet anticipated wartime demands.

A level area near Bainbridge, seven miles (11 km) northwest of the City adjacent to the Seaboard Air Line Railroad was selected by the Air Corps, and the City of Bainbridge and Decatur County purchased 2,070 acres (8.4 km^{2}) for $66,800 and then leased the property to the Army for $1 per annum for a basic flight training base authorizing 89.9 million for its construction.

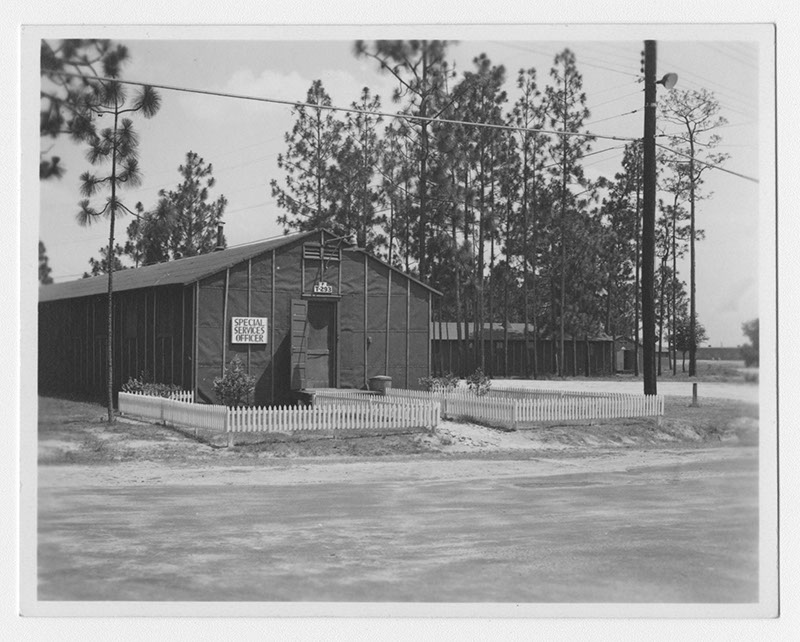
Photograph of special services officer's building, June 1944

The contractor broke ground on 3 April 1942, for Bainbridge Army Airfield. The immediate construction involved runways and airplane hangars, with concrete runways, several taxiways and a large parking apron and a control tower. Several large hangars were also constructed. Buildings were ultimately utilitarian and quickly assembled. Most base buildings, not meant for long-term use, were constructed of temporary or semi-permanent materials. Although some hangars had steel frames and the occasional brick or tile brick building could be seen, most support buildings sat on concrete foundations but were of frame construction clad in little more than plywood and tarpaper. In addition to the main facility, several sub-bases and auxiliaries were established to support the training mission.

- Donalsonville Auxiliary Field 31°00′30″N 84°52′23″W
- Reynoldville Auxiliary Field 30°50′03″N 84°47′19″W
- Faceville Auxiliary Field 30°42′11″N 84°37′49″W
- Vada Auxiliary Field 31°03′36″N 84°26′19″W
- Babcock Auxiliary Field 31°07′03″N 84°37′01″W
- Commodore Decatur Auxiliary Field 30°54′56″N 84°36′33″W

The first troops moved in on 4 July 1942. Initial construction reached completion on 25 August.

=== World War II ===
Flight training began on 2 August 1942, with 75 Vultee BT-13s. It was used by the Army Air Forces Flying Training Command, Southeast Training Center (later Eastern Flying Training Command) for advanced single-engine flight training, both by military and contract civilian air instructors. The Army Air Forces Pilot School (Advanced Single-Engine) was the Operational Training Unit. By 1 September the complement of aircraft had risen to 132 BT-13s and 14 BT-15s.. For a time, Bainbridge also hosted twin-engine advanced training in the AT-10 until other bases reached completion.

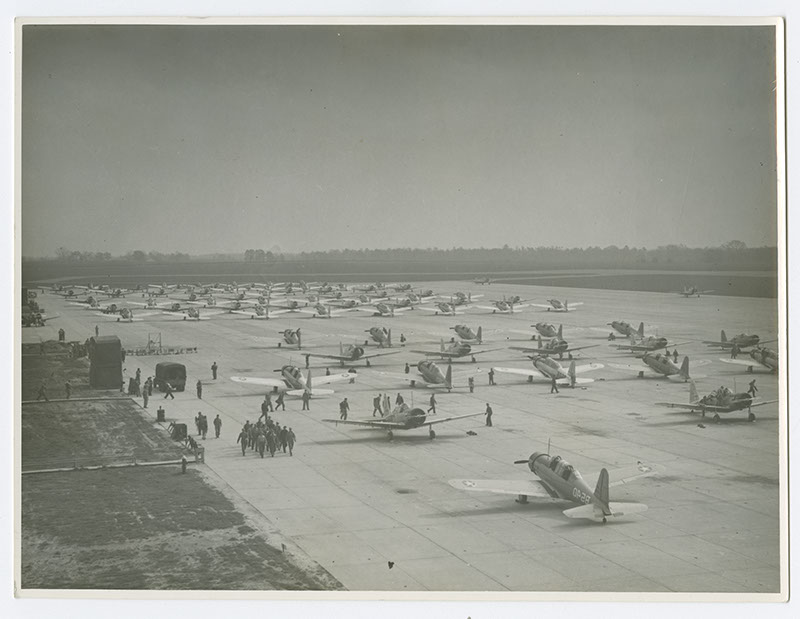
Photograph of airplanes at the Bainbridge Army Airfield, 1944

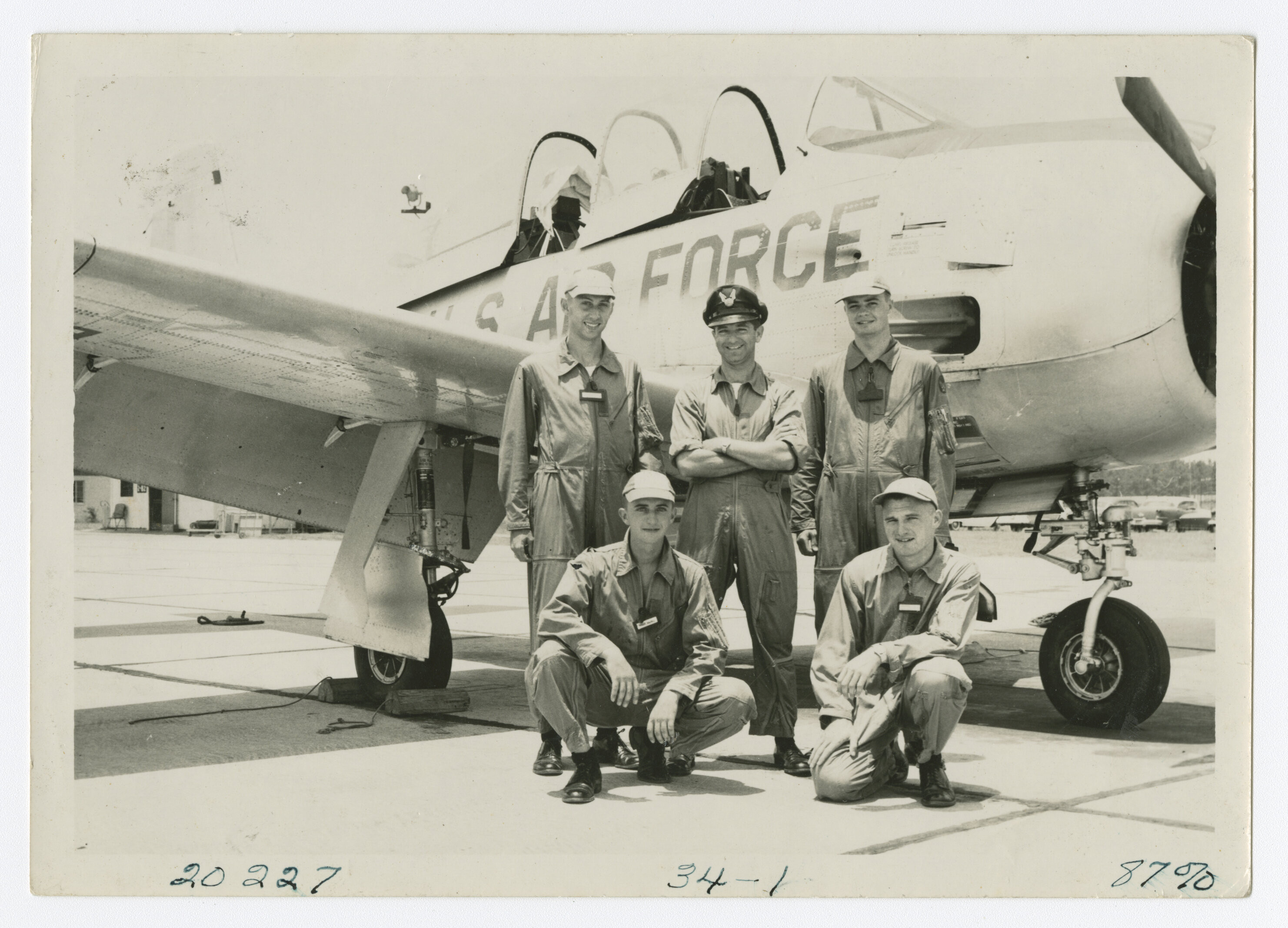
Photograph of men in front of a U.S. Air Force plane, Bainbridge, Georgia, 1956

Bainbridge closed on 24 December 1944. Remaining flight cadets were reassigned to Shaw AAF and Cochran AAF to complete basic flight training. With the airfield's closure, the Army Air Force gifted the base to the City and County.

=== Air Training Command ===
There was little need, however, for the airfield, and in the immediate postwar years, farmers leased the open areas of the airfield for cultivation and the cantonment area was used for various purposes.

As a result of the Korean War which began in 1950 and the expansion of the United States Air Force, Bainbridge Air Base* was reopened. The base had deteriorated badly over its six idle years and a major renovation project was required to return it to acceptable standards. In January 1951, rehabilitation of the base began. It was activated on 11 July 1951 by the USAF Air Training Command, as a contract flying training school. The 3306th Pilot Training Group (Contract Flying) was the Operational Training Unit, with ground and flight training being conducted by Southern Airways Company using World War II-era T-6 Texans that had been upgraded and designated as T-6G's. Beginning with Class 54-ABC in the spring of 1953, the first 25 hours of flight instruction was given in Piper Super Cubs (PA-18) with 125 hp (93 kW) engines. This was examined as a means of reducing the cost of discovering which students would wash out of the program due to lack of flying ability. After this initial 25 hours, flight training was then continued in the T-6G. At this time, in addition to U.S. Air Force personnel (which consisted of aspiring officers as well as Aviation Cadets), personnel from the NATO countries of France, Italy, the Netherlands, Denmark and Norway were also entered into the USAF flight-training program, and trained alongside their USAF counterparts.

Bainbridge Air Base expanded rapidly and during the height of the Korean War had six classes of 140 students in training at one time. Following the end of the Korean War, class numbers reduced to four. During the 1954/1955 timeframe, Bainbridge retired the T-6's transitioning to the T-28 and T-34. Besides USAF students, flight cadets from Italy, Portugal, Venezuela, West Germany, Japan, France and newly independent South Vietnam were trained. The base received Cessna T-37 Tweet jet trainers starting in December 1959 as part of "Project All-Jet" in attempt to determine effectiveness of primary flight training in one type of aircraft.

In 1960, ATC began looking at a new training concept—combining preflight, primary, and basic instruction into consolidated pilot training (CPT), later renamed Undergraduate Pilot Training (UPT). Secretary of the Air Force Dudley C. Sharp approved the idea in March 1960, and Air Training Command intended to have the training program in operation by March 1961. At the same time, Secretary Sharp approved initiation of a consolidated pilot training program, ATC decided to replace all civilian flying instructors with military officers, as had been done with the instructor cadre when the T-37 was introduced, and to phase out all contract primary schools.

Bainbridge AB ended contract primary training in early December, with the transfer of the T-37 aircraft being completed by 23 December 1960. The base was inactivated and returned to civilian control on 31 March 1961.

Today, Bainbridge is used for various purposes in addition to a small amount of aviation activity. On the former base are several manufacturing plants. For a time, the Southern Airways built student housing was used by a mental health facility. Some of the remaining Southern Airways buildings are occupied by the Georgia Department of Corrections as a prison. The golf course built in the 1950s is still in use, and the World War II hangars are still in use.

Through the years a lot of material has been gathered about the Southern Airways School and Bainbridge Air Base. The information is located at the Decatur County Museum.

.* Note: Air Training Command applied the "Air Base" designator to private contractor-operated flying training bases in the 1950s

== See also ==
- Georgia World War II Army Airfields
- 27th Flying Training Wing (World War II)
