= Henry Tift Myers Airport =

Airport in Tift County, Georgia, US

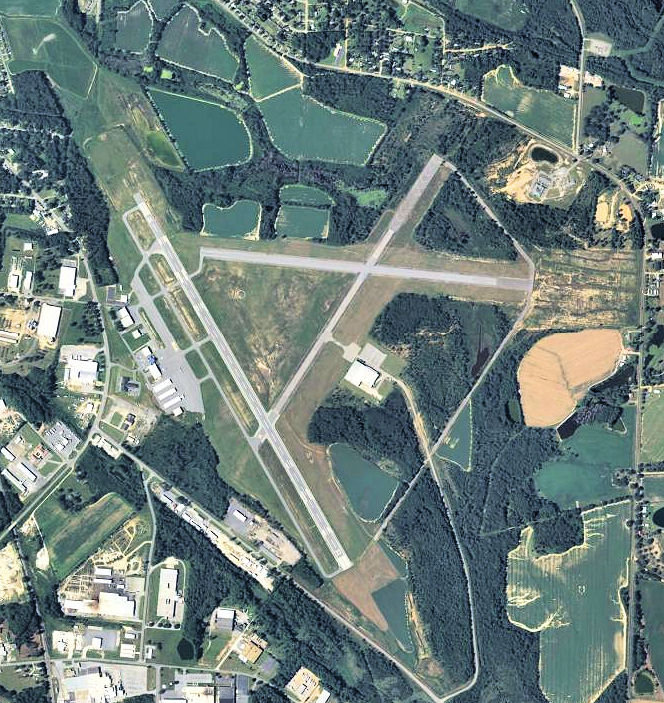
- 2006 USGS airphoto

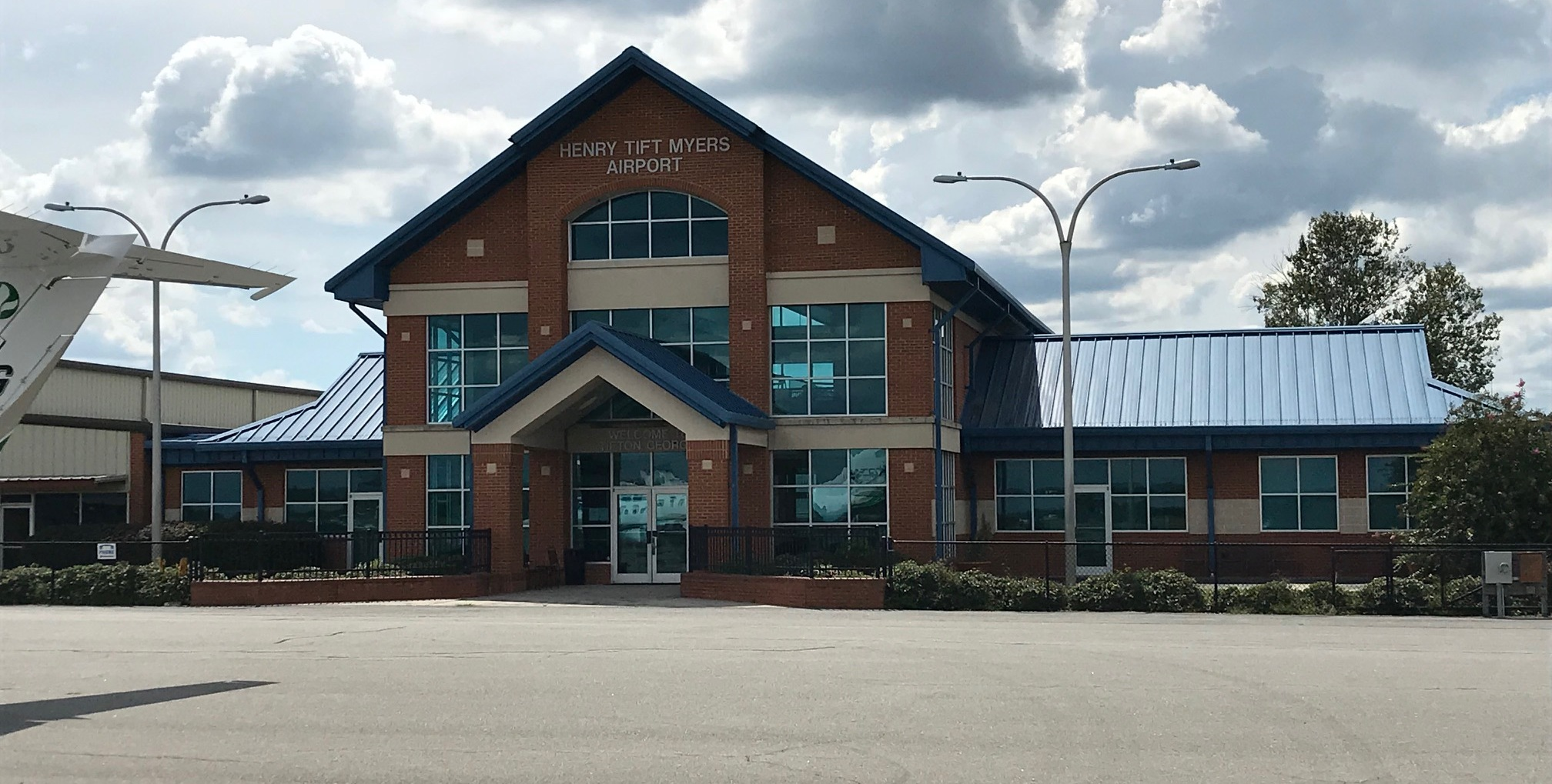
- IATA: TMA; ICAO: KTMA; FAA LID: TMA

Summary
- Airport type: Public
- Owner: Tifton & Tift County Airport Authority
- Serves: Tifton, Georgia
- Elevation AMSL: 355 ft (108 m)
- Coordinates: 31°25′44″N 83°29′19″W

Map
- Location of airport in Georgia

Runways
Direction	Length		Surface
Direction	ft	m	Surface
16/34	6,506	1,983	Asphalt
10/28	3,807	1,160	Asphalt

Statistics (2021)
- Aircraft operations: 19,200
- Based aircraft: 26
- Source: Federal Aviation Administration

Henry Tift Myers Airport (IATA: TMA, ICAO: KTMA, FAA LID: TMA) is a public use airport located two nautical miles (4 km) southeast of the central business district of Tifton, a city in Tift County, Georgia, United States. It is owned by the Tifton & Tift County Airport Authority. This airport is included in the National Plan of Integrated Airport Systems for 2011–2015, which categorized it as a general aviation facility. It does not have scheduled commercial airline service.

== History ==
The airport was constructed in 1940. In April, while under construction, the United States Army Air Corps indicated a need for the airfield as a training airfield. The immediate construction involved runways and airplane hangars, with three concrete runways, several taxiways and a large parking apron and a control tower. Several large hangars were also constructed. Buildings were ultimately utilitarian and quickly assembled. Most base buildings, not meant for long-term use, were constructed of temporary or semi-permanent materials. Although some hangars had steel frames and the occasional brick or tile brick building could be seen, most support buildings sat on concrete foundations but were of frame construction clad in little more than plywood and tarpaper.

Tifton Army Airfield (also known as Turner AAF Auxiliary Field No. 9) was activated on August 12, 1940. It was used by the Army Air Forces Flying Training Command, Southeast Training Center (later Eastern Flying Training Command) for advanced two-engine flying training throughout World War II, until inactivated on December 28, 1944. Aircraft flown at Tifton AAF were generally Curtiss AT-9s, and later TB-25 Mitchells.

Tifton AAF was placed on inactive status though the balance of the war, being turned over to the Army Corps of Engineers on September 21, 1946. Title was returned to civil authorities in 1947. The airport was renamed Henry Tift Myers Airport in honor of Tifton native Colonel Henry T. "Hank" Myers, who was the first pilot of Air Force One.

== Facilities and aircraft ==
Henry Tift Myers Airport covers an area of 826 acres (334 ha) at an elevation of 355 feet (108 m) above mean sea level. It has two asphalt paved runways: 16/34 is 6,506 by 100 feet (1,678 x 30 m) and 10/28 is 3,807 by 75 feet (1,160 x 23 m).

For the 12-month period ending December 31, 2021, the airport had 19,200 aircraft operations, an average of 53 per day: 99% general aviation and 1% military. At that time there were 26 aircraft based at this airport: 15 single-engine, 10 multi-engine, and 1 jet.

== See also ==
- Georgia World War II Army Airfields
- List of airports in Georgia (U.S. state)
