= Georgia World War II Army Airfields =

Georgia World War II Army Airfields
- Part of World War II

Site information
- Type: Army Airfields

Location
- Map of Major Georgia World War II Army Airfields: First Air Force; Third Air Force; AAF Training Command; AAF Contract Flying Schools; Air Technical Service Command

Site history
- Built: 1940–1944
- In use: 1940--present

During World War II, the United States Army Air Forces (USAAF) established numerous airfields in Georgia for antisubmarine defense in the Gulf of Mexico and for training pilots and aircrews of USAAF fighters and bombers.

Most of these airfields were under the command of Third Air Force or the Army Air Forces Training Command (AAFTC) However the other USAAF support commands (Air Technical Service Command (ATSC); Air Transport Command (ATC) or Troop Carrier Command) commanded a significant number of airfields in a support roles.

It is still possible to find remnants of these wartime airfields. Many were converted into municipal airports, some were returned to agriculture and several were retained as United States Air Force installations and were front-line bases during the Cold War. Hundreds of the temporary buildings that were used survive today, and are being used for other purposes.

== Major airfields ==
=== First Air Force, later Third Air Force ===
- Chatham Army Air Field, 6.7 miles (10.8 km) west-northwest of Savannah

425th Base Headquarters & Air Base Squadron: 22 January 1943 – 10 April 1944
114th Army Air Force Base Unit (First AF): 10 April 1944 – 28 March 1945
323rd Army Air Force Base Unit (Third AF): 1 May 1945 – 8 Jun 1947
Also used by: Army Air Forces Antisubmarine Command (1942–1943)
Transferred to: Third Air Force (1945)
Was: Chatham Air Force Base (1947–1950)
Now: Savannah/Hilton Head International Airport (IATA: SAV, ICAO: KSAV, FAA LID: SAV)
And Savannah Air National Guard Base
And Georgia ANG Combat Readiness Training Center

- Harris Neck Army Airfield, 32.7 miles (52.6 km) south-southwest of Savannah

Sub-base of: Dale Mabry Field, Florida
346th Army Air Force Base Unit (Third AF): 1 May 1944 – 1945
Transferred to: United States Navy (1945)
Now: Harris Neck National Wildlife Refuge

=== Third Air Force ===
- Statesboro Army Airfield, 3.6 miles (5.8 km) northeast of Statesboro

Sub-base of: Morris Field. North Carolina, later William Northern Field, Tennessee
4157 Army Air Force Base Unit: 1 May 1945 – 26 January 1946
Now: Statesboro-Bulloch County Airport (IATA: TBR, ICAO: KTBR, FAA LID: TBR)

- Thomasville Army Airfield, 7.4 miles (11.9 km) northeast of Thomasville

339th Army Air Force Base Unit: 1 May 1944 – 6 February 1946
Now: Thomasville Regional Airport (IATA: TVI, ICAO: KTVI, FAA LID: TVI)

- Hunter Field, 5.7 miles (9.2 km) south-southwest of Savannah

Air Base Squadron, 35th Air Base Group/36th Air Base Squadron/36th Base Headquarters & Air Base Squadron: 5 October 1940 – 1 May 1944
302nd Army Air Force Base Unit: 1 May 1944 – 15 December 1946
Also used by: Army Air Forces Antisubmarine Command (1942–1943)
Was: Hunter Air Force Base (1950–1967)
Now: Hunter Army Airfield (United States Army) (IATA: SVN, ICAO: KSVN, FAA LID: SVN)
And: Coast Guard Air Station Savannah

- Waycross Army Airfield, 3.5 miles (5.6 km) northwest of Waycross

531st Base Headquarters & Air Base Squadron: 10 May 1943 – 1 May 1944
345th Army Air Force Base Unit: 1 May 1944 – 10 October 1945
Sub-base of: Hunter Field, later Drew Field, Florida
Now: Waycross-Ware County Airport (IATA: AYS, ICAO: KAYS, FAA LID: AYS)

=== AAF Training Command ===
Eastern Flying Training Command

- Bainbridge Army Air Field, 6.0 miles (9.7 km) northwest of Bainbridge

AAF Basic Flying Training School/AAF Pilot School (Basic): 15 Jun 1942 – 1 May 1945
322nd Base Headquarters & Air Base Squadron: 25 July 1942 – 30 April 1944
2127th Army Air Force Base Unit (AAF Eastern Flying Training Command): 30 April 1944 – 1 May 1945
4164th Army Air Force Base Unit:(Air Technical Service Command): 1 May 1945 – 9 March 1946
Known sub-bases and auxiliaries

Donalsonville Auxiliary Field
Reynoldville Auxiliary Field
Faceville Auxiliary Field
Vada Auxiliary Field
Babcock Auxiliary Field
Commodore Decatur Auxiliary Field

Later: Bainbridge Air Base (1951–1961)
3306th Pilot Training Group (Contract Flying)
Now: Decatur County Industrial Air Park (IATA: BGE, ICAO: KBGE, FAA LID: BGE)

- Cochran Army Airfield, 10.3 miles (16.6 km) south of Macon

Air Corps Basic Flying School/AAF Basic Flying Sch/AAF Pilot School (Basic): 15 May 1941 – 15 April 1945
Hq, 27th Flying Training Wing: 26 December 1942-1 May 1945
61st Air Base Squadron/61st Base Headquarters & Air Base Squadron: 28 May 1941 – 30 April 1944
2128th Army Air Force Base Unit: 1 May 1944 – 15 April 1945
Known sub-bases and auxiliaries

Gunn Auxiliary Field
Perry Auxiliary Field
Harris Auxiliary Field
Byron Auxiliary Field
Myrtle Auxiliary Field

Now: Middle Georgia Regional Airport (IATA: MCN, ICAO: KMCN, FAA LID: MCN)

- Moody Field, 10.6 miles (17.1 km) north-northeast of Valdosta

Air Corps Advanced Flying School (Two Engine)/AAF Advanced Flying School (Two Engine)/AAF Pilot School (Advanced, Two Engine): 26 June 1941 – 30 April 1945
Hq, 29th Flying Training Wing: 26 December 1942-1 April 1945
78th Air Base Squadron/78th Base Headquarters & Air Base Squadron: 25 November 1941 – 30 April 1944
2144th Army Air Force Base Unit: 1 May 1944 – 30 April 1945
Known sub-bases and auxiliaries

Rock Ford Auxiliary Field
Lake Park Auxiliary Field
Bemiss Auxiliary Field
New River Auxiliary Field
Valdosta Auxiliary Field

Now: Moody Air Force Base (IATA: VAD, ICAO: KVAD, FAA LID: VAD)

- Spence Field, 5.8 miles (9.3 km) east-southeast of Moultrie

Air Corps Advanced Flying School (Single Engine)/AAF Advanced Flying School (Single Engine)/AAF Pilot School (Advanced, Single Engine): 12 July 1941 – 1 August 1945
75th Air Base Squadron/75th Base Headquarters & Air Base Squadron: 26 December 1941 – 30 April 1944
2133rd Army Air Force Base Unit: 1 May 1944 – 15 December 1945
Known sub-bases and auxiliaries

Berlin Auxiliary Field
Norman Park Auxiliary Field
Moultrie Municipal Airport
Tifton Municipal Airport

Later: Spence Air Base (1951–1961)
3302d Flying Training Squadron (Contract Flying)
Now: Spence Airport (IATA: MUL, ICAO: KMUL, FAA LID: MUL)

- Turner Army Airfield, 3.9 miles (6.3 km) east-southeast of Albany

Air Corps Advanced Flying School (Two Engine)/AAF Advanced Flying School (Two Engine)/AAF Pilot School (Advanced, Two Engine): 1 August 1941-15 August 1946
Hq, 74th Flying Training Wing: 25 Aug 43-Unknown
68th Air Base Squadron/68th Base Headquarters & Air Base Squadron: 25 June 1941 – 30 April 1944
2109th Army Air Force Base Unit: 1 May 1944 – 15 August 1946
Known sub-bases and auxiliaries

Leesburg Auxiliary Field
West Smithville Auxiliary Field
West Leesburg Auxiliary Field
North Smithville Auxiliary Field
Cordele Municipal Airport
Vidalia-Lyons Auxiliary Field
Tifton Municipal Airport
Albany Army Airfield

Later: Turner Air Force Base (1947–1967)
Later: Naval Air Station Albany (1967–1976)
Now: Non-Aviation Use (Industrial Area); runway removed

==== AAF Contract Flying Schools ====
- Albany Army Airfield, 3.7 miles (6.0 km) northwest of Albany

Contract Flying School: Darr Aero Tech
Also: Auxiliary to Turner Field
52nd Army Air Force Flying Training Detachment (Primary)
Known sub-bases and auxiliaries

Hayley Auxiliary Field
Reynolds Auxiliary Field
River Auxiliary Field
Turner Auxiliary Field

Now: Southwest Georgia Regional Airport (IATA: ABY, ICAO: KABY, FAA LID: ABY)

- Bush Field, 7.1 miles (11.4 km) south of Augusta

Contract Flying School: Georgia Aero Tech
72nd Army Air Force Flight training Detachment (Basic)
Known sub-bases and auxiliaries

Dionne Auxiliary Field
Yawn Auxiliary Field

Now: Augusta Regional Airport (IATA: AGS, ICAO: KAGS, FAA LID: AGS)

- Douglas Municipal Airport, 2.5 miles (4.0 km) south of Douglas

South Georgia College Civil Pilot Training School (Primary)
63d Flight Training Detachment
Known sub-bases and auxiliaries

Tanner-Ewing Auxiliary Field
Knight Auxiliary Field
Dorminey Auxiliary Field
Paulk Auxiliary Field

Now: Douglas Municipal Airport (ICAO: KDQH, FAA LID: DQH)

- Souther Field, 3.7 miles (6.0 km) south of Americus

Souther Civil Pilot Training School (Primary)
56th AAF Flying Training Detachment (Primary)
Now: Jimmy Carter Regional Airport (ICAO: KACJ, FAA LID: ACJ)

=== Air Technical Service Command ===
- Atlanta Army Air Field, 8.1 miles (13.0 km) south-southwest of Atlanta

Base Detachment/303rd Air Base Squadron/303rd Base Headquarters & Air Base Squadron: 15 January 1941 – 1 April 1944
4204th Army Air Force Base Unit: 1 April 1944-26 May 1946
Warner Robins Air Service Command (WRASC)
USAAF/Civil Airfield Joint Use
Also used by: United States Navy
Now: Hartsfield-Jackson Atlanta International Airport (IATA: ATL, ICAO: KATL, FAA LID: ATL)

- Daniel Field, 4.4 miles (7.1 km) west of Augusta

21st Air Base Squadron/21st Base Headquarters & Air Base Squadron: 8 August 1941 – 1 April 1944
4050th Army Air Force Base Unit: 1 April 1944 – 4 March 1946
Warner Robins Air Service Command (WRASC)
Also used by Third Air Force (1941-1942)
Joint use USAAF/Civil Airfield
Also used by: Army Air Forces Antisubmarine Command (1942–1943)
Now: Daniel Field (IATA: DNL, ICAO: KDNL, FAA LID: DNL)

- Macon Army Air Base, 4.3 miles (6.9 km) east of Macon

37th Air Depot Group
469th Army Air Force Base Unit
Warner Robins Air Service Command (WRASC)
USAAF/Civil Airfield Joint Use
Now: Macon Downtown Airport (IATA: MAC, ICAO: KMAC, FAA LID: MAC)

- Marietta Army Airfield, 13.7 miles (22.0 km) north-northwest of Atlanta

292d Army Air Force Base Unit: 25 March 194 – 13 April 1944
Bell Aircraft B-29 Superfortress Manufacturing/Delivery
Also used by: Second Air Force
Now: Dobbins Joint Air Reserve Base (IATA: MGE, ICAO: KMGE, FAA LID: MGE)

- Robins Field, 1.4 miles (2.3 km) north-northeast of Warner Robins

4117th Army Air Force Base Unit
Warner Robins Air Service Command (WRASC)
Warner Robins Air Depot
Now: Robins Air Force Base (IATA: WRB, ICAO: KWRB)
And: Warner Robins Air Logistics Center (WRALC)

== Minor airfields ==
- Lawson Field, 8.6 miles (13.8 km) south of Columbus

Camp Benning Army Support
54th Army Air Force Base Unit (I Troop Carrier Command)
Was: Lawson Air Force Base (1947–1954)
Now: Lawson Army Airfield (IATA: LSF, ICAO: KLSF, FAA LID: LSF)

- Liberty Army Airfield, 3.5 miles (5.6 km) east of Hinesville

Camp Stewart Army Support
WASP/Antiaircraft Training
Now: MidCoast Regional Airport at Wright Army Airfield (IATA: LIY, ICAO: KLHW, FAA LID: LHW)
