= Commodore Decatur Airport =

Airport in Georgia, United States

Commodore Decatur Airport Commodore Decatur Army Auxiliary Airfield
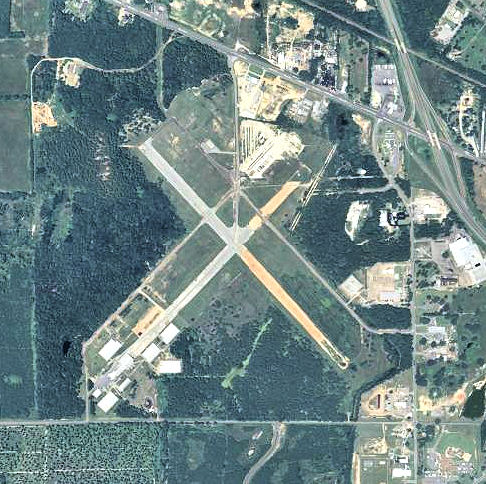
- 2006 USGS airphoto
- IATA: none; ICAO: none

Summary
- Serves: Bainbridge, Georgia
- Coordinates: 30°54′56″N 084°36′32″W

Map
- Location of Commodore Decatur Airport

Commodore Decatur Airport is a closed airport located 2 miles west-northwest of Bainbridge, Georgia, United States.

== History ==
Built by the United States Army Air Forces around 1943, during World War II, the airport was used as an auxiliary training airfield for the Army pilot school at Bainbridge Army Airfield.

With the end of the war, it was turned over to the city of Donalsonville and developed into a municipal airport. It was closed around 1995.

Today, the closed airport is used every year for a Bikefest. Motorcycle clubs from all over the southeast show up for a week; they race on the strip and camp out.

The runway on the northwest is complete, with runway markers and lines still visible.

== See also ==
- Georgia World War II Army Airfields
