= Perry–Houston County Airport =

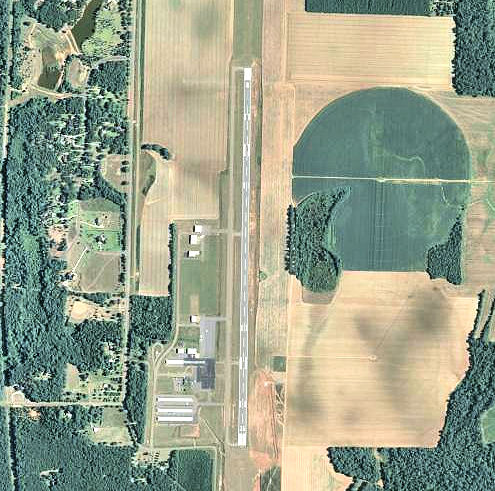
- 2006 USGS airphoto
- IATA: none; ICAO: KPXE; FAA LID: PXE

Summary
- Airport type: Public
- Owner: Perry–Houston County Airport Authority
- Serves: Perry, Georgia
- Elevation AMSL: 418 ft / 127 m
- Coordinates: 32°30′38″N 83°46′02″W

Map
- Location of Perry–Houston County Airport

Runways
Direction	Length		Surface
Direction	ft	m	Surface
18/36	5,002	1,525	Asphalt

Statistics (2006)
- Aircraft operations: 22,000
- Based aircraft: 67
- Source: Federal Aviation Administration

Perry–Houston County Airport (ICAO: KPXE, FAA LID: PXE) is a public airport located four miles (6 km) northwest of the central business district of Perry, a city in Houston County, Georgia, United States and 10 miles (16 km) south of Warner Robins, Georgia. It is owned by the Perry–Houston County Airport Authority. It is used for general aviation, mainly flight training.

== Overview ==
Although most U.S. airports use the same three-letter location identifier for the FAA and IATA, Perry–Houston County Airport is assigned PXE by the FAA but has no designation from the IATA.

== Facilities and aircraft ==
Perry–Houston County Airport covers an area of 465 acres (188 ha) and contains one asphalt paved runway designated 18/36 which measures 5,004 x 100 ft (1,525 x 30 m). For the 12-month period ending January 31, 2006, the airport had 22,000 general aviation aircraft operations, an average of 60 per day. There are 84 aircraft based at this airport: 91% single-engine, 6% multi-engine and 3% helicopter.

== History ==
Opened in July 1942, during World War II, the Perry–Houston County airport was used as an auxiliary training airfield for the Army pilot school at Cochran Army Airfield. With the end of the war, it was turned over to the city of Perry and developed into a municipal airport which opened in May 1947.

== See also ==
- Georgia World War II Army Airfields
- List of airports in Georgia (U.S. state)
