= 30th Tactical Reconnaissance Squadron =

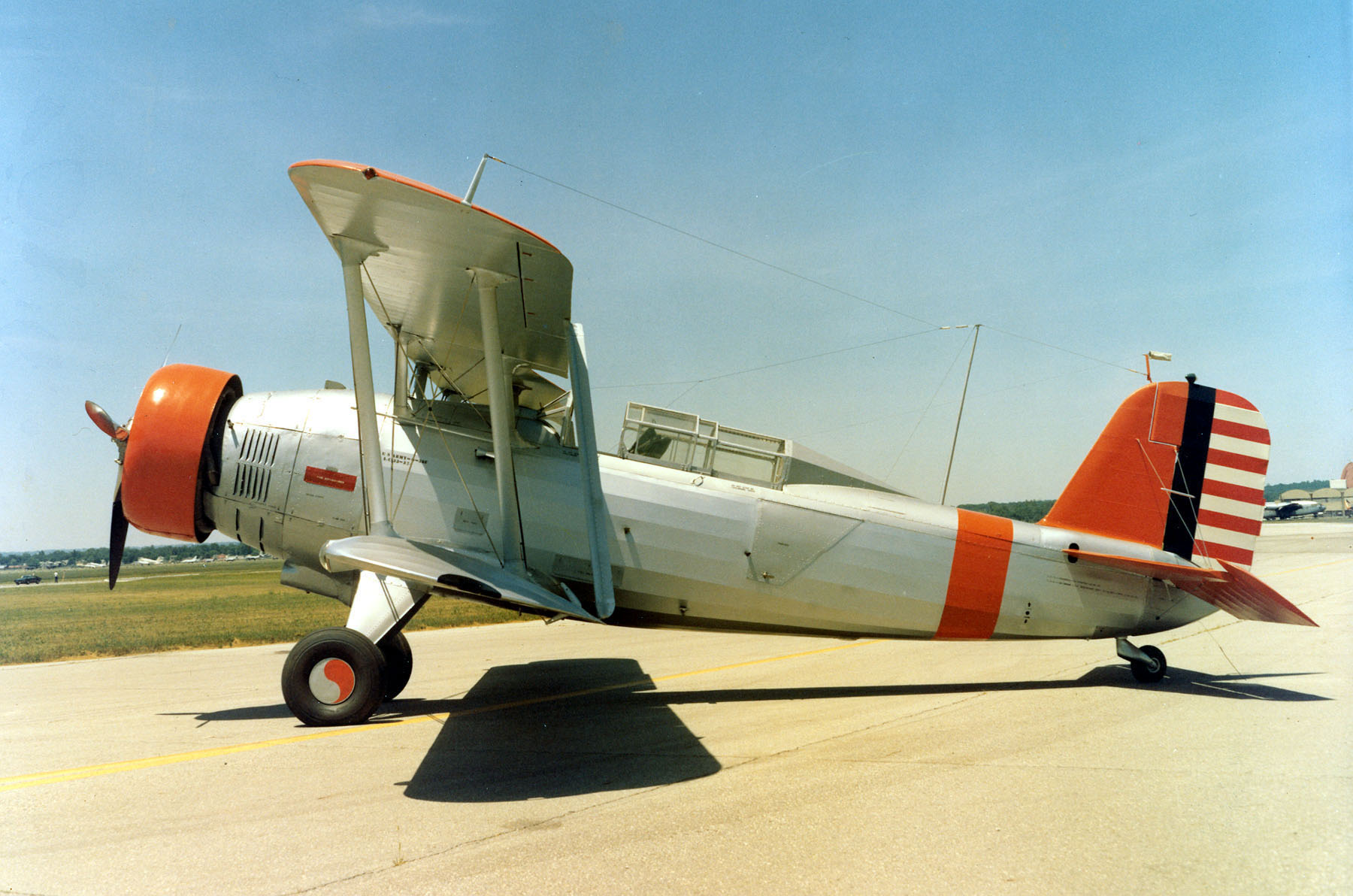
- Douglas O-38, original equipment of the squadron
- Active: 1940-1944
- Country: United States
- Branch: United States Air Force
- Role: Reconnaissance
- Engagements: American Theater of World War II

Insignia
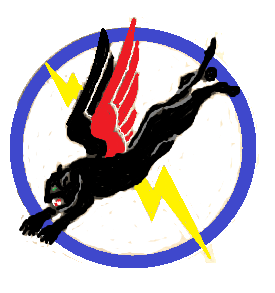
- 30 Tactical Reconnaissance Sq emblem (Note: Approved 24 August 1943.)

The 30th Tactical Reconnaissance Squadron is a disbanded United States Air Force unit. It was first activated in November 1940 as the 30th Army Reconnaissance Squadron, and from 1941 to 1943 was designated the 30th Observation Squadron. It participated in maneuvers and helped train ground units through 1942, when it became a Replacement Training Unit. It was disbanded on 1 May 1944 at Key Field, Mississippi.

== History ==
The squadron was first activated as the 30th Army Reconnaissance Squadron at Atlanta Army Air Field in November 1940 as the United States expanded its air arm prior to its entry into World War II and assigned to the Fourth Corps Area. Along with the 31st Army Reconnaissance Squadron, activated two months later it was intended to provide reconnaissance for a numbered army. In January 1941, the squadron was assigned to Third Army. It began to equip with a combination of obsolescent Douglas O-38s and light Stinson O-49 Vigilants. By the fall of 1941, the squadron was redesignated the 30th Observation Squadron and was assigned to the newly-formed II Air Support Command.

In March 1942, the squadron became part of the 75th Observation Group, and two months later moved to Tullahoma Army Air Field. The squadron primarily assisted the training of Army Ground Forces units, providing them with not only aerial reconnaissance and artillery adjustment, but also strafing and dive bombing flights. In these missions, the squadron flew a mix of observation and liaison aircraft, along with light and medium bombers. In the fall of 1942, it participated in the Louisiana Maneuvers. That November, the 75th Group, which had been stationed at Birmingham Army Air Field, joined the squadron at Tullahoma.

In 1943, the unit became a Replacement Training Unit (RTU). RTUs were oversized units that trained individual pilots or aircrews. In August, the squadron became the 30th Tactical Reconnaissance Squadron and, along with its parent group, moved operations to Key Field, Mississippi. By the end of 1943, the squadron specialized in training reconnaissance pilots in single engine fighter type aircraft and was equipped with Bell P-39 Airacobras, Curtiss P-40 Warhawks, and North American P-51 Mustangs. However, the Army Air Forces (AAF) was finding that standard military units like the 30th, whose manning and equipment was based on relatively inflexible tables of organization were not proving to be well adapted to the training mission. Accordingly, the AAF adopted a more functional system in which each base was organized into a separate numbered unit. On 1 May 1944, the squadron and other elements of the 75th Group, along with support units at Key Field were disbanded and replaced by the 347th AAF Base Unit (Replacement Training Station, Tactical Reconnaissance).

== Lineage ==
- Constituted as the 30th Army Reconnaissance Squadron on 20 November 1940

Activated on 30 November 1940
Redesignated 30th Observation Squadron on 14 August 1941
Redesignated 30th Observation Squadron (Medium) on 13 January 1942
Redesignated 30th Observation Squadron on 4 July 1942
Redesignated 30th Reconnaissance Squadron (Fighter) on 2 April 1943
Redesignated 30th Tactical Reconnaissance Squadron on 11 August 1943
Disbanded on 1 May 1944

=== Assignments ===
- Fourth Corps Area, 30 November 1940
- Third Army, 24 January 1941
- Second Army, c. May 1941
- II Air Support Command, 1 September 1941
- 75th Observation Group (later 75th Reconnaissance Group, 75th Tactical Reconnaissance Group), 12 March 1942 – 1 May 1944

=== Stations ===
- Atlanta Army Air Base, Georgia, 30 November 1940
- Tullahoma Army Air Field, Tennessee, 29 June 1942
- Key Field, Mississippi, 17 August 1943 – 1 May 1944

=== Aircraft ===
- Stinson O-49 Vigilant, 1941–1943
- Douglas O-38, 1941–1942
- North American O-47, 1942–1943
- Curtiss O-52 Owl, 1942
- Piper L-4 Grasshopper, 1942–1943
- O-46, 1942-1943
- North American B-25 Mitchell, 1942-1943
- Douglas DB-7, 1942–1943 and Douglas A-20 Havoc, 1943
- Bell P-39 Airacobra, 1943-1944
- Curtiss P-40 Warhawk, 1943-1944
- North American P-51 Mustang, 1943-1944

=== Service ribbon ===
Service Streamer	Campaign	Dates	Notes
	American Theater without inscription	7 December 1941 – 1 May 1944	
