= Thomasville Regional Airport =

Thomasville Regional Airport Thomasville Army Airfield
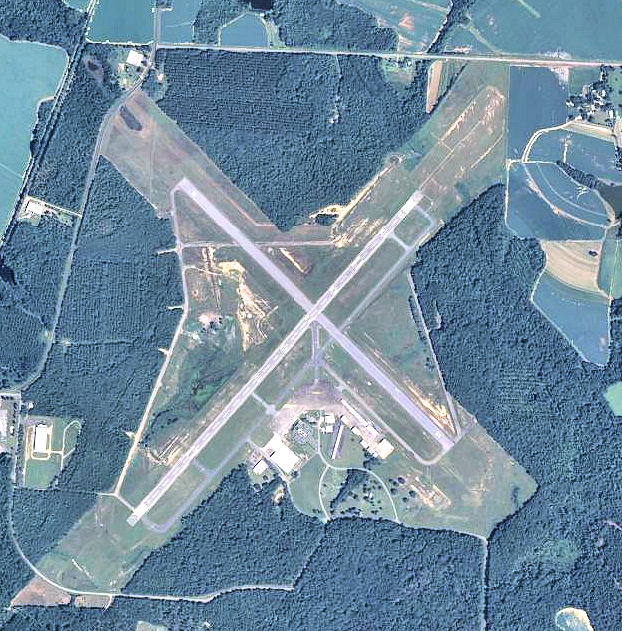
- USGS 2006 orthophoto
- IATA: TVI; ICAO: KTVI; FAA LID: TVI

Summary
- Airport type: Public
- Owner: City of Thomasville
- Serves: Thomasville, Georgia
- Elevation AMSL: 264 ft / 80 m
- Coordinates: 30°54′06″N 083°52′52″W

Map
- Location of airport in Georgia

Runways
Direction	Length		Surface
Direction	ft	m	Surface
4/22	6,004	1,830	Asphalt
14/32	4,999	1,524	Asphalt

Statistics (2021)
- Aircraft operations: 12,500
- Based aircraft: 46
- Source: Federal Aviation Administration

Thomasville Regional Airport (IATA: TVI, ICAO: KTVI, FAA LID: TVI) is a city-owned, public-use airport located six nautical miles (7 mi, 11 km) northeast of the central business district of Thomasville, a city in Thomas County, Georgia, United States. It is included in the National Plan of Integrated Airport Systems for 2011–2015, which categorized it as a general aviation facility. The airport does not have scheduled commercial airline service.

== History ==
During World War II, Thomasville Army Airfield was a United States Army Air Forces Third Air Force training base for reconnaissance and later fighter pilots.

In 1941, civic leaders applied to the Civil Aeronautics Administration to build a modern airport. A site was selected 8.5 miles ENE of the city. After the City and the County purchased 903 acres, the CAA awarded a $316,000 contract for the construction of two 4,000-foot (1,200 m) runways, fences, lighting, and a hangar. By the time the contract had been completed in September 1942, the City and County had leased the airport to the United States Army Air Forces for $1 per year for the duration of the war.

The Army planned to utilize Thomasville as a sub-base of Dale Mabry Army Airfield, Tallahassee, Florida for Third Air Force dive-bomber operational training. Work continued on extending the runways to 5,000 ft., and adding an apron, taxiways, and hardstands. The AAF purchased an additional 152.5 acres for the cantonment area. Eleven Civilian Conservation Corps buildings were moved from Halo, Florida and erected as the initial barracks and mess hall. Forty additional buildings were constructed to provide accommodations for 340 officers and 1000 men. Essentially, the buildings were shacks with 30# tarpaper on the exterior walls and 90# tarpaper on the roof. The structures had neither central heat nor indoor plumbing, requiring the use of potbellied stoves and outdoor latrines. A 50-man unit arrived from Dale Mabry on December 2, 1942, to guard the rising base.

=== World War II ===
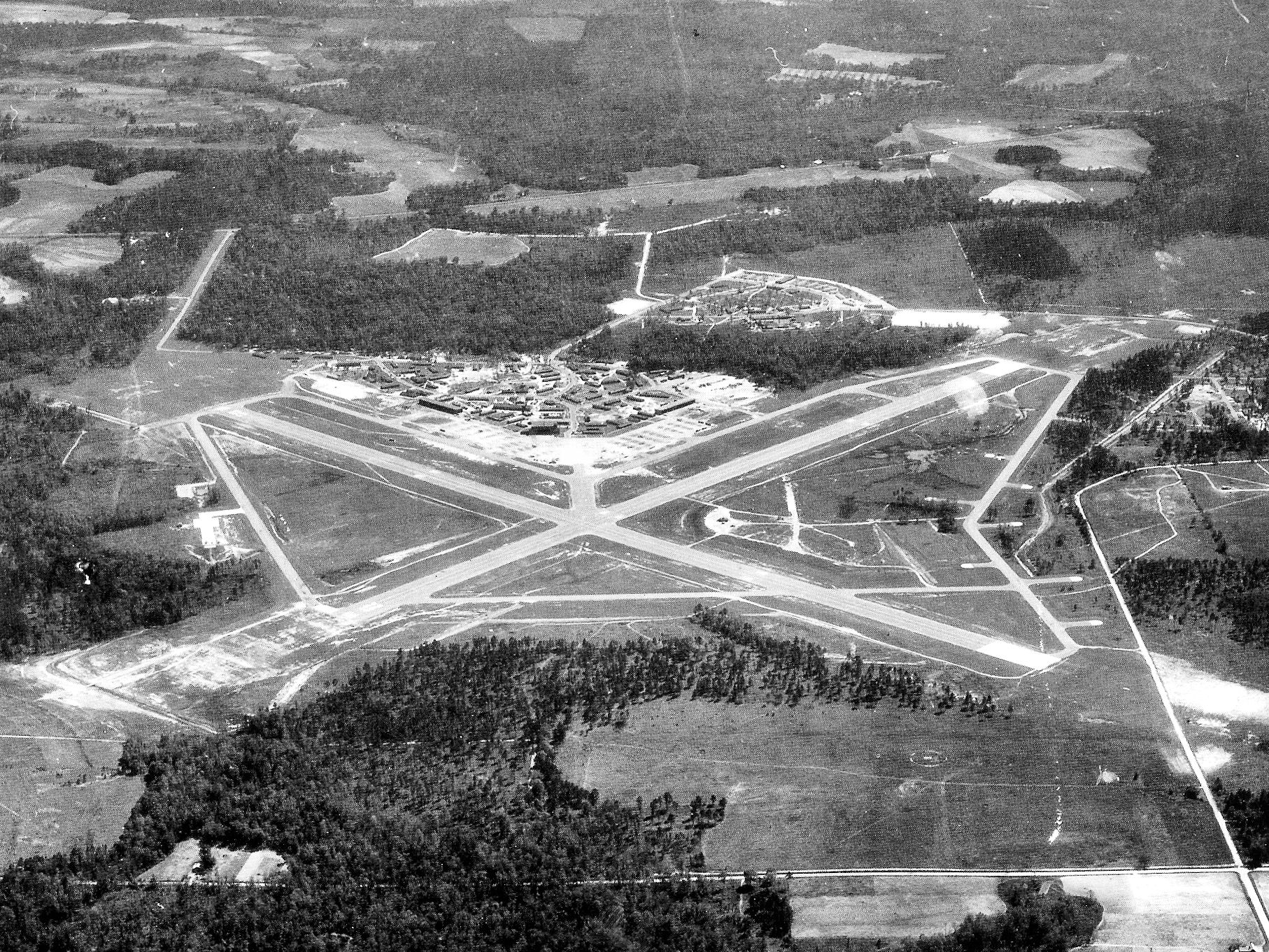
Thomasville Army Airfield in 1943

The Army activated Thomasville Army Airfield on March 1, 1943. Shortly thereafter, the 59th Reconnaissance Group, consisting of the 9th, 104th, 119th, and 126th Reconnaissance Squadrons (Fighter) arrived from Fort Myers Army Airfield, Florida with P-39 Airacobras. The mission of the 59th RG was the training of replacement pilots. In actuality, only two of the squadrons were fully manned. Two of the squadrons were squadrons in name only as they had a strength of one man. In August, the 59th was redesignated as the 59th Fighter Group. In turn, the 9th, 104th, and 119th Squadrons became the 488th, 489th, and the 490th Fighter Squadrons. The 126th was redesignated as the 34th Reconnaissance Squadron and transferred to Peterson Army Air Field, Colorado Springs, Colorado. These changes were administrative in nature and the overall manning of the base remained as before.

On September 26, 1943, the base had an "Open House" attended by an estimated 25,000 people. Due to the distance from town, a local bus line provided scheduled service to the base. "Air Puffs" was the base newspaper. In the autumn of the year, additional construction took place at the area commonly referred to as, "Up on the Hill." This wooded area had been used for hunting by some of the men. The new construction provided headquarters, a mess hall, and barracks for the Base Detachment, which operated and maintained the base. The guard squadron, that had been living in tents, received new barracks as well. In November, the last squadron of the 59th FG, the 447th, formed.

On May 1, 1944, the Army redesignated the 59th Fighter Group as the Thomasville Replacement Training Unit. Support organizations included the 1333rd Guard Sq and 493rd Sub Depot. The same month, the P-39s were replaced by P-40 Warhawks. During mid-1944, a $52,000 project provided some additional buildings. Eventually, Thomasville had 128 buildings plus three hangars. Bombing, skip bombing, and strafing took place on a 6,900-acre leased range, 28 miles ESE near Quitman, Georgia.

In May 1945, all these units were replaced by the 339th AAF Base Unit (Combat Crew Training School, Fighter) which flew the P-51 Mustang, replacing the P-40s. On August 1, the Army held another "Open House" on the base. With the end of the war, Thomasville closed on September 30, 1945.

=== Thomasville Regional Airport ===
The former base was used for various purposes after the war including a technical college. The runways were used for drag racing and the "Up on the Hill" area became the local "lover's lane."

Very little evidence of the Army remains. Tucked away in a remote part of the airport can be found a taxiway with the base's former bore sighting range and revetment. Still in evidence is a small pit on the range's taxiway for a P-39's nose gear. The pit has a sloped entry that lowered the P-39's nose to allow the bore sighting of the guns. Taildraggers such as the P-40 and P-51 had to have the tail jacked up to bring the guns to bear. The original Army light beacon was also in evidence in 2004.

== Facilities and aircraft ==
Thomasville Regional Airport covers an area of 1,301 acres (526 ha) at an elevation of 264 feet (80 m) above mean sea level. It has two asphalt paved runways: 4/22 is 6,004 by 101 feet (1,830 × 31 m) and 14/32 is 4,999 by 100 feet (1,524 × 30 m).

For the 12-month period ending December 31, 2021, the airport had 12,500 aircraft operations, an average of 34 per day: 99% general aviation and 2% military. At that time there were 46 aircraft based at this airport: 30 single-engine, 4 multi-engine, 9 jet, and 3 glider.

== See also ==
- Georgia World War II Army Airfields
- List of airports in Georgia (U.S. state)
