= Southwest Georgia Regional Airport =

Airport in Georgia, United States

Southwest Georgia Regional Airport (former Albany Army Airfield)

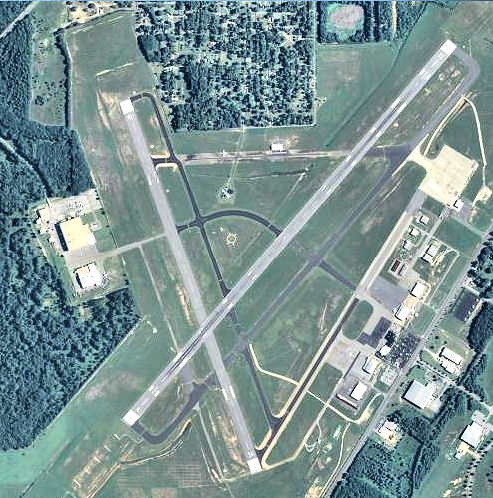
- USGS 2006 orthophoto
- IATA: ABY; ICAO: KABY; FAA LID: ABY; WMO: 72216

Summary
- Airport type: Public
- Owner: City of Albany
- Serves: Albany, Georgia
- Elevation AMSL: 196 ft (60 m)
- Coordinates: 31°32′08″N 84°11′40″W
- Website: airport.albanyga.gov

Map
- Location within Georgia Location within the United States

Runways
Direction	Length		Surface
Direction	ft	m	Surface
5/23	6,601	2,012	Asphalt
17/35	5,219	1,591	Asphalt

Statistics (2022)
- Aircraft operations (year ending 11/30/2022): 18,240
- Based aircraft: 37
- Source: Federal Aviation Administration

Southwest Georgia Regional Airport (IATA: ABY, ICAO: KABY, FAA LID: ABY) is an airport four miles southwest of Albany, in Dougherty County, Georgia, in the United States. The National Plan of Integrated Airport Systems for 2011–2015 categorized it as a primary commercial service airport. Federal Aviation Administration records say the airport had 39,200 passenger boardings (enplanements) in calendar year 2008, 33,044 in 2009 and 35,494 in 2010.

== History ==
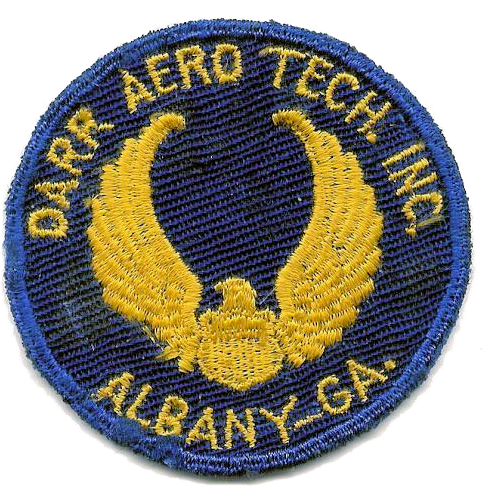
Patch of the 52nd Army Air Force Fight Training Detachment

Albany Airport opened in 1935, about 4 miles southwest of the city. In October 1938 Eastern Air Lines began mail service to the field. Eastern's Eddie Rickenbacker announced that as soon as the city improved the airport, Eastern would start passenger service. The City was doing just that during 1939 and 1940 in the form of a WPA project to enlarge the landing area and build a passenger terminal.

In 1940, the United States Army Air Corps was establishing civil pilot training schools at airports in the southeast, with its moderate weather. Albany Airport had been rejected as an advanced training base (Turner Army Airfield was built north of Albany instead), but it was approved for a primary contract school in June. The City agreed to provide $500,000 for further improvements to the landing field, the completion of the passenger terminal, the cost of two new hangars and half the cost of a third hangar. An additional investment of over $400,000 was made by Hal S. Darr, owner of the contract flying school for the construction of the cantonment area and one half the cost of one hangar. Ground was broken in July 1940. The Army Air Corps named the school the 52nd Army Air Force Fight Training Detachment. Thus Darr Aero Tech became the first Army Air Corps activity constructed in Georgia during the buildup to World War II. In addition to the main school at Albany, the following auxiliary airfields were used:

- Hayley Auxiliary Field 31°27′30″N 084°11′30″W
- Reynolds Auxiliary Field 31°27′40″N 084°27′38″W
- River Auxiliary Field (location undetermined)
- Turner Auxiliary Field (location undetermined)

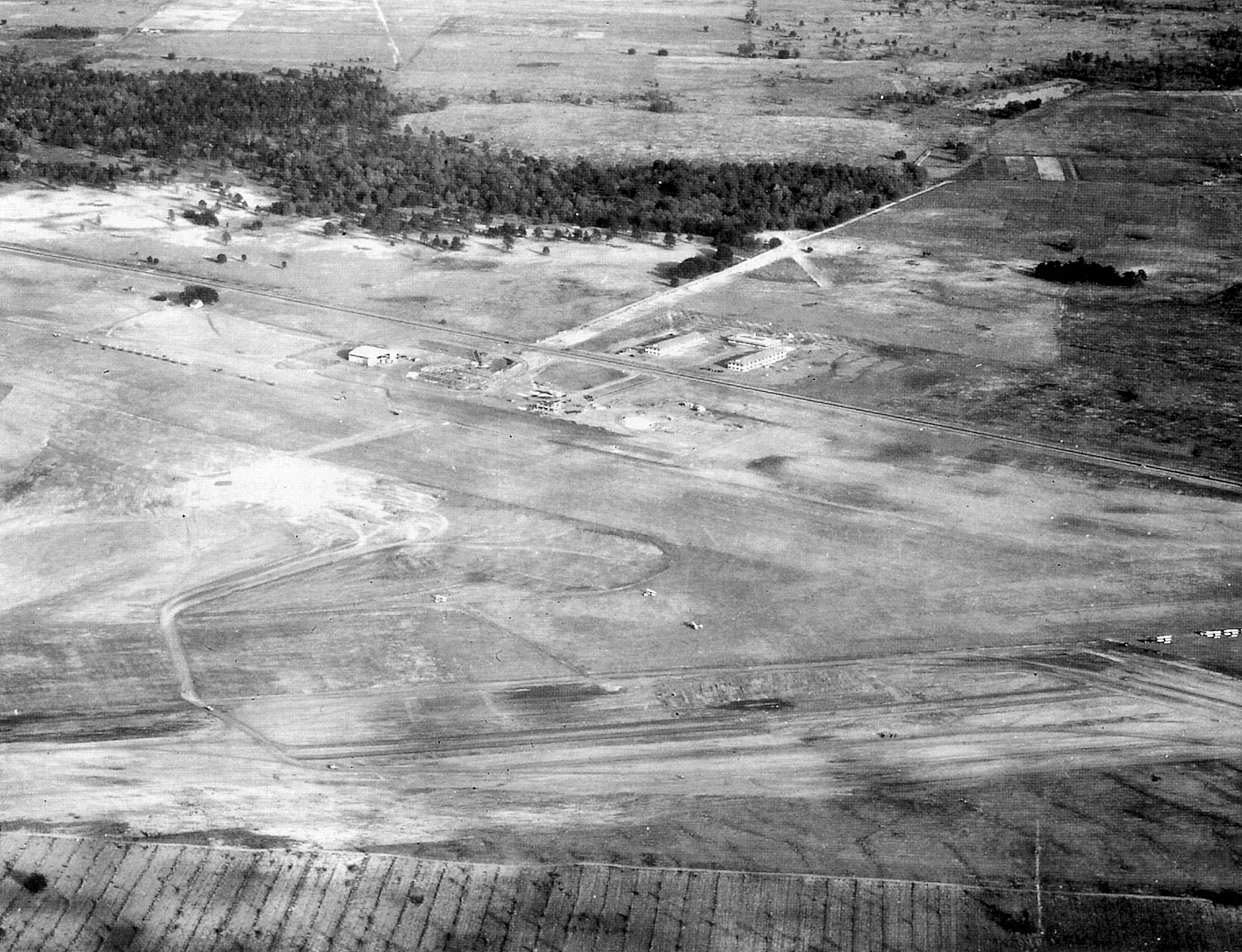
Albany Army Airfield 1944, looking southeast

On August 15, 1940, the first class of 45 cadets began training. The cadets were initially housed in the Georgia Hotel until the barracks reached completion on 20 August. Flight training commenced with 15 PT-13 Stearmans and 11 flight instructors. Seven classes of American cadets were trained until July 1941. On June 8, 1941, the school received the first British RAF cadets under the Arnold Scheme. For the next 14 months, Darr's classes were exclusively British. A conflict existed between Turner and Darr over airspace. Generally, Turner's airspace was north of Albany and Darr's south of Albany. Where the areas overlapped, Turner's aircraft flew above 5,000 ft. and Darr's below 5,000. Darr's three auxiliary fields were south of Albany.

During the first year of operation Darr Aero Tech graduated 559 American and 86 British cadets. The last British class graduated on October 10, 1942. The seven British cadets killed at Darr and Turner Field, were interred at Albany's Crown Hill Cemetery. A granite monument and flagpole erected by the Albany American Legion Post 30 mark the graves today.

On December 11, 1941, the Defense Plant Corporation bought the school from Mr. Darr for $408,000 and the airfield was called Albany Army Airfield. Anticipating an increase in training, an additional $100,000 was spent on improvements in 1942 that included a dispensary, cold storage building, additional barracks and a Link Trainer building. After the end of 1943 training began to decrease, eventually ending with the closing of the school on December 28, 1944.

In September 1945, control of the airfield was turned over to the city of Albany, and Eastern resumed service in 1945. Southern arrived in 1949; Eastern pulled out in 1971 and the DC-9s of Southern's successor Republic left in 1984.

The airport eventually received paved runways. In 1959, a new terminal building was completed and named in honor of Mayor Bill McAfee, who had recently died. In 2004, the only structures of Darr Aero Tech remaining were the three hangars. No trace of the cantonment area exists.

Albany Army Airfield and Darr Aero Tech are remembered by a display inside the terminal building plus a memorial and flagpole outside.

== Facilities ==
The airport covers 980 acres (397 ha) at an elevation of 196 feet (60 m). It has two asphalt runways: 5/23 is 6,601 by 148 feet (2,012 x 45 m) and 17/35 is 5,219 by 148 feet (1,591 x 45 m).

In the year ending November 30, 2022 the airport had 18,240 aircraft operations, average 50 per day: 53% general aviation, 21% military, 15% air taxi, and 11% airline. 37 aircraft were then based at the airport: 24 single-engine, 7 multi-engine, 4 jet, and 2 helicopter.

The production facilities for Thrush Aircraft are next to the airport.

The airport also has a lease with the Albany Composite Squadron to operate in the former fire station.

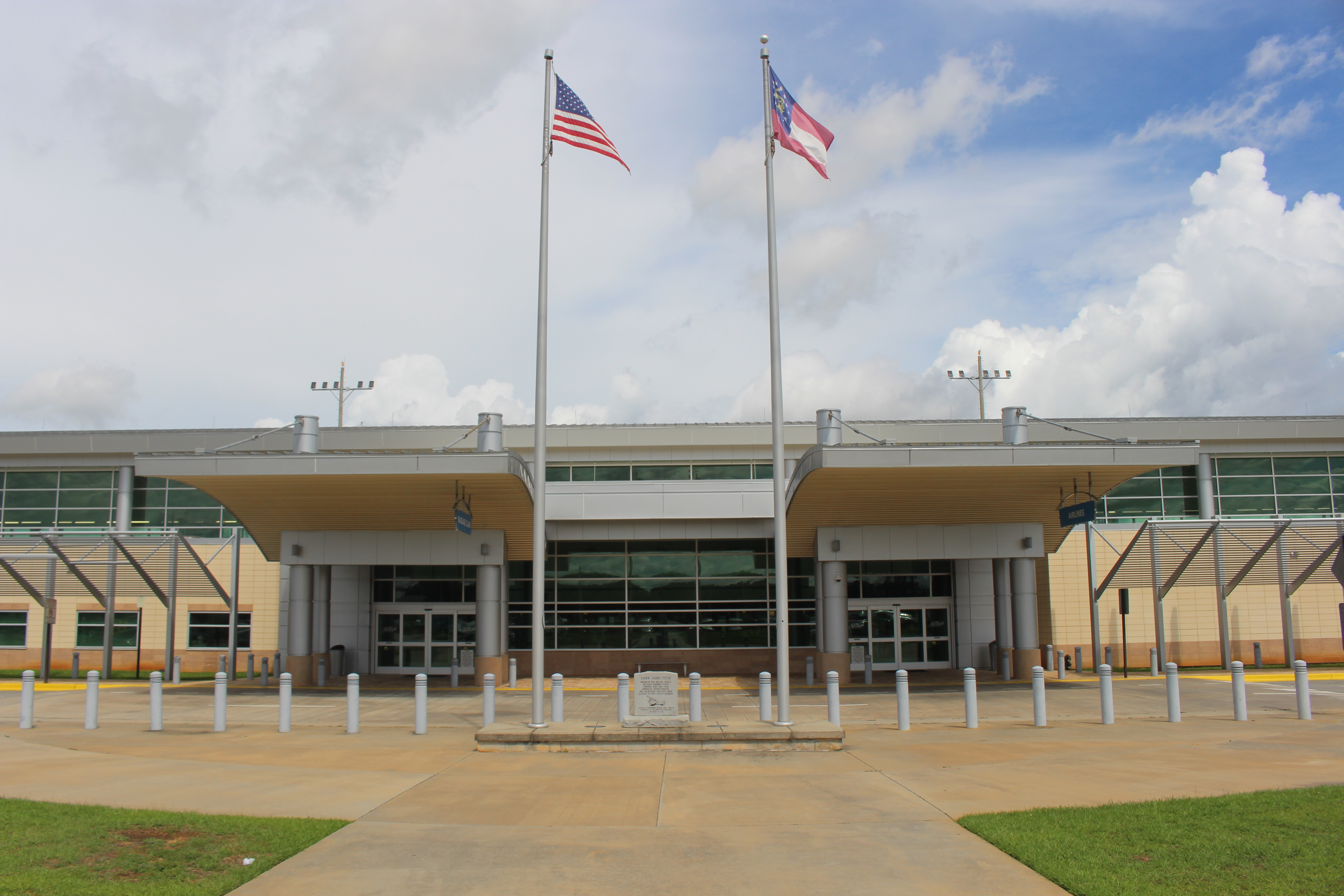
Southwest Georgia Regional Airport entrance

== Airlines and destinations ==
=== Passenger ===
Airlines	Destinations
Delta Connection	Atlanta

Destinations map
Destinations from Southwest Georgia Regional Airport

=== Cargo ===
Airlines	Destinations
UPS Airlines	Jacksonville (FL), Louisville, Orlando, Pensacola, Philadelphia, West Palm Beach; Seasonal: Atlanta, New Orleans

== Statistics ==
Carrier shares: August 2024 – July 2025
Carrier	Passengers (arriving and departing)
SkyWest Airlines	61,960(94.11%)
Endeavor Air	3,860(5.87%)

Top domestic destinations: August 2024 – July 2025
Rank	City	Airport	Passengers
1	Atlanta, GA	Hartsfield–Jackson International (ATL)	33,450

== See also ==
- Georgia World War II Army Airfields
- List of airports in Georgia (U.S. state)
- 29th Flying Training Wing (World War II)
