= MidCoast Regional Airport at Wright Army Airfield =

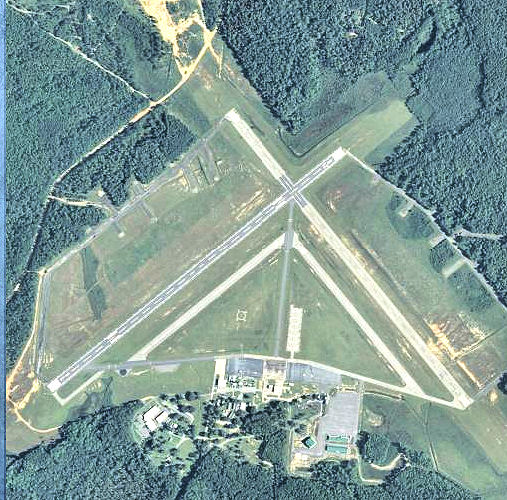
- 2006 USGS airphoto
- IATA: LIY; ICAO: KLHW; FAA LID: LHW

Summary
- Airport type: Public / Military
- Owner: United States Army
- Operator: Joint Management Board (City of Hinesville, Liberty County, U.S. Army)
- Location: Fort Stewart; Hinesville, Georgia
- Elevation AMSL: 45 ft / 14 m
- Coordinates: 31°53′21″N 081°33′44″W
- Website: MidCoastRegionalAirport.com

Map
- Location of MidCoast Regional Airport

Runways
| Direction | Length | | Surface |
| Direction | ft | m | Surface |
|---|---|---|---|
| 6L/24R | 6,500 | 1,981 | Asphalt |
| 6R/24L | 2,605 | 794 | Asphalt |
| 15L/33R | 5,000 | 1,524 | Asphalt |
| 15R/33L | 2,518 | 767 | Asphalt |

Statistics
- Aircraft operations: 5,600
- Based aircraft: 15
- Sources: FAA and airport website

MidCoast Regional Airport at Wright Army Airfield (IATA: LIY, ICAO: KLHW, FAA LID: LHW) is a joint public and military use airport at Fort Stewart, a United States Army post located near the city of Hinesville in Liberty County, Georgia, United States. The airport's physical address is 1116 E. Lowe Circle, Fort Stewart, GA 31314 and its mailing address is P.O. Box 10, Hinesville, GA 31310.

Wright Army Airfield became a joint-use facility in November 2007. The name MidCoast refers to its location on the Georgia coast between Savannah/Hilton Head International Airport and Brunswick Golden Isles Airport. The airport is managed by a Joint Management Board (JMB) consisting of the City of Hinesville, Liberty County Board of Commissioners and Liberty County Development Authority and the U.S. Army. The JMB contracted with ABS Aviation Management Services to manage and operate the new facilities and the fixed-base operator (FBO) for civilian operations.

Although most U.S. airports use the same three-letter location identifier for the FAA and IATA, this airport is assigned LHW by the FAA and LIY by the IATA (which assigns LHW to Lanzhou Zhongchuan International Airport, Gansu, China).

== History ==
In early 1942, construction began on an airfield at Camp Stewart. Camp Stewart Army Airfield was also known as Liberty Airfield for its Georgia county location. The facility was quite small with two 5,000-ft. runways, approximately a dozen and a half hardstands, and barracks for 50 officers and 300 men.

On 1 January 1943, the Air Technical Service Command 4th Tow Target Detachment moved to the newly completed airfield from Atlanta Army Airfield with a mission of towing aerial targets for anti-aircraft artillery training, with the airfield becoming a sub-base of Atlanta, with the 142d Army Air Force Base Unit being the host unit.. The Detachment's aircraft consisted of a mixture of aircraft, consisting of the Douglas A-20 Havoc, Beech C-43 Staggerwing, Taylorcraft L-2 Grasshopper, Beech AT-7, Douglas A-24 Dauntless, Curtiss A-25 Helldiver, and the B-34 Lexington. In October, 15 Women Army Service Pilots (WASP) began a 90-day course in the operation of radio controlled targets while piloting A-24 and A-25 aircraft.

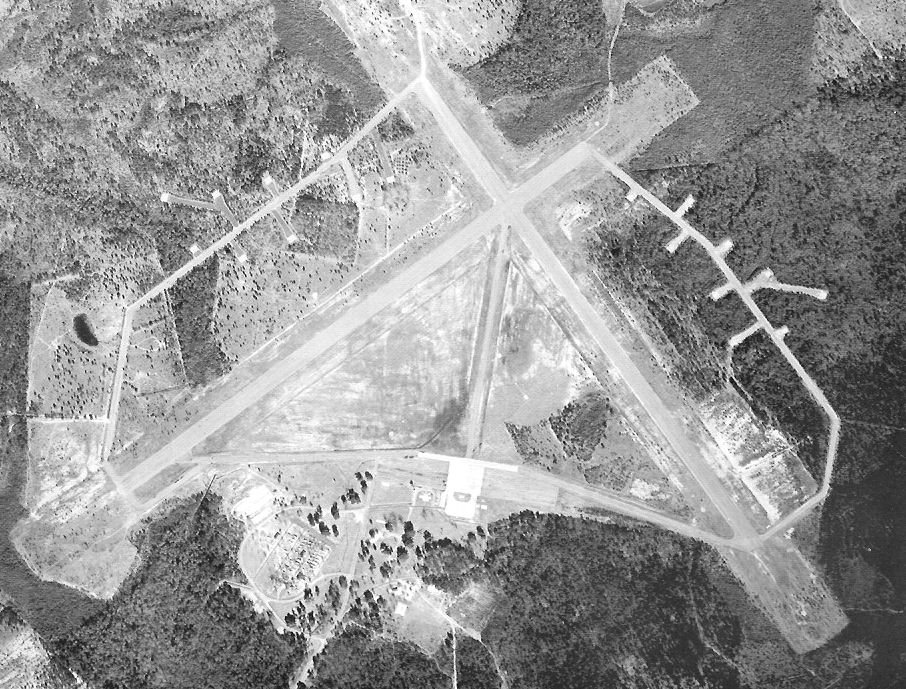
1944 image of Camp Stewart Airfield

The peak utilization of Stewart AAF took place in the spring of 1944, during the buildup for the invasion of Europe when over 55,000 men were present. In addition to anti-aircraft artillery training, Stewart AAF also trained cooks and bakers as well as postal units. The camp also had a POW compound for Germans and Italians captured in North Africa. The POWs were put to work on the camp's construction projects and local farms. By the spring of 1945, the camp was virtually empty except for the POW compound. On March 25, 1945, the airfield deactivated and the Detachment transferred to Chatham AAF.

Following the end of the war, the Army used Camp Stewart as a separation center for a short period of time before deactivating it on 30 September 1945.

In the postwar years, the Army utilized the camp during the summer for the training of National Guard units. Camp Stewart re-opened during the Korean War for training of the 3rd Army's anti-aircraft artillery units. In 1953, the training of armor units was added. In 1959, the Army made the post a permanent United States Army facility, designated it as an Armor and Artillery Training Center, renaming it Fort Stewart. Camp Stewart Army Airfield was renamed Wright Army Airfield and used as a military airport within the Fort Stewart facility.

During the Vietnam War, the airfield trained initial entry Army Fixed Wing Aviators and helicopter pilots. When the Air Force closed Hunter AFB in 1967, the Army took it over as a sub-base of Fort Stewart and established a Flight Training Center. Fort Stewart became the Army's focal point in Aviation Training and between 1967 and 1970, the need for aviation increased. In early 1968, construction was complete for a new 110' control tower at Wright Army Airfield. Opening of the new control tower was delayed due to injuries sustained by construction workers while it was being built. A single fatality (Richard "Old Red" Frank) is also on record, due to a fall from the top of the tower. Construction was temporarily paused until improved measures could be put in place to ensure the safety of the men working. In 1970, Hunter AFB was re-designated Hunter Army Airfield and was used in-conjunction with Wright Army Airfield. With the end of the Vietnam War Fort Stewart became idle once again. That ended with the reactivation of the 24th Infantry Division at Stewart in 1974. In 1996, the 3rd Infantry Division activated and remains at Fort Stewart today, with Wright Army Airfield being an operational part of the facility.

== Facilities and aircraft ==
The airport covers an area of 429 acres (174 ha) at an elevation of 45 feet (14 m) above mean sea level. It has four asphalt paved runways: 6L/24R is 6,500 by 100 feet (1,527 x 30 m); 6R/24L is 2,605 by 100 feet (794 x 30 m); 15L/33R is 5,000 by 150 feet (1,524 x 46 m); 15R/33L is 2,518 by 100 feet (767 x 30 m) with an asphalt surface.

A new 13,825-square-foot (1,284 m^{2}) terminal building contains a civilian fixed-base operation (FBO) terminal and a military operations building which is leased to the Army Corps of Engineers. The airport has 12 T-hangars, 5 box hangars, and a 10,000-square-foot (929 m^{2}) bulk hangar with a 30-foot (9 m) door. The civilian general aviation part of the development also includes a large ramp, with both self-fueling, and Full-Service trucks for 100LL and Jet-A fuels, and aircraft wash facilities.

Over a 12-month period the airport had 5,600 aircraft operations, an average of 15 per day: 89% general aviation and 11% military. At that time there were 15 aircraft based at this airport: 86.7% single-engine, 6.7% multi-engine and 6.7% helicopter.

== See also ==
- Georgia World War II Army Airfields
- Air Technical Service Command
- List of airports in Georgia (U.S. state)
