= Atlanta Army Air Field =

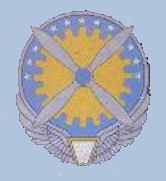
Atlanta Army Air Field
- Part of Air Technical Service Command
- Candler Field, Clayton County, near College Park, Georgia
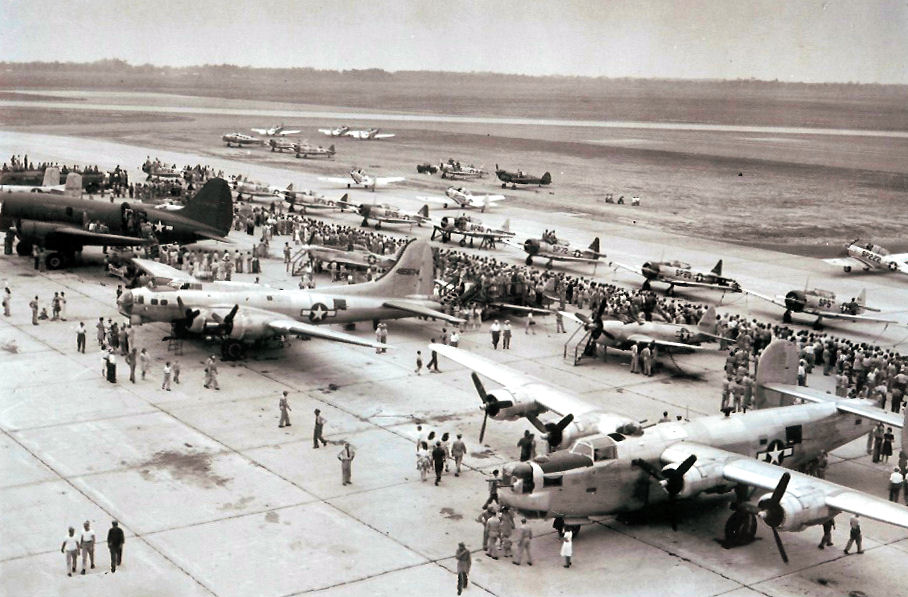
- Open house at Atlanta Army Air Field, 1945, after V-J Day. Shown are a B-24 Liberator, B-17 Flying Fortress, various trainers, a C-46 Commando, and other unidentified aircraft

Site information
- Type: Joint use Civilian Airport/Military Airfield

Location
- Coordinates: 33°38′12″N 084°25′41″W

Site history
- Built: About 1925 (Civil Airport)
- In use: 1940-1945 (military use)

Atlanta Army Air Field is a former United States Army Air Corps training facility that operated on the grounds of the present Hartsfield–Jackson Atlanta International Airport during World War II.

== History ==
With the fall of France in 1940, the Army Air Corps began a massive expansion program. The quickest way to obtain additional airbases was to take over existing municipal airports where the runways were already in place.

To provide a base for a reconnaissance squadron for the Second Army, the War Department and the Chief of the Air Corps approved the establishment of a base at Candler Field, just south of Atlanta, Georgia. Although the Air Force later regretted the decision to build at Atlanta due to the large amount of airline traffic, construction nevertheless began in late 1940.

On 30 November 1940, the Army Air Corps activated Atlanta Army Air Field and assigned it to the Southeast Air District. It assigned the 30th Tactical Reconnaissance Squadron to Atlanta, equipping it with Douglas O-38 biplanes and later Stinson L-1s. The 128th Observation Squadron, a Georgia National Guard unit, activated on 1 May 1941. One month later, the 4th Tow Target Squadron also activated.

With a complement of 14 enlisted men and no aircraft or officers, the unit moved on to Hunter Field in Savannah, Georgia one month later. In September 1941, the 128th Observation Squadron transferred to Lawson Field, at Fort Benning.

The servicing of military aircraft soared. In 1940, the base serviced 5,911 aircraft. In 1941, the number almost doubled to 11,686. During 1941/1942, the Works Project Administration extended the existing runways at Candler Field as well as building two additional runways. During this period, the base took on the additional mission of the medical examination and processing of prospective aviation cadets.

After the 30th Observation Squadron transferred to Tullahoma Army Air Field, Tennessee in June 1942, Atlanta was reassigned to the Air Technical Service Command under the control of Warner Robins Air Depot Control Area. Its primary mission was servicing transient aircraft, with the Embry Riddle Company (Overhaul Division) being the prime contractor at the airfield. In 1942 the base serviced an average of 2,180 aircraft a month. The next year, the number jumped to 8,167 per month. To accomplish this task, the complement of enlisted men rose from 79 in 1940 to 556 in 1943.

According to figures compiled by the CAA, Atlanta was the busiest controlled airport in the United States during 1943. The AAF established an Air Freight Terminal on 1 February 1944. Six daily flights were scheduled with C-47 aircraft to Dayton, Newark, Miami, San Antonio, and Salina, Kansas.

Atlanta Army Air Field closed on 1 June 1946 and the military facilities were turned over to civil control on 25 June. After the war Air Force Reserve and Georgia Air National Guard units were formed at Marietta Army Air Field, northwest of the city.

Today, Atlanta's Candler Field is known as Hartsfield–Jackson Atlanta International Airport, and it is one of the world's biggest and busiest airports bearing no resemblance to the wartime facility. The only structures on airport property remaining from its military use during World War II are Delta Air line's original office and hangar still in use by the airline.

== See also ==
- Georgia World War II Army Airfields
- Air Technical Service Command
