= Vidalia Regional Airport =

Airport in Toombs County, Georgia, US

Vidalia Regional Airport Vidalia-Lyons Army Airfield
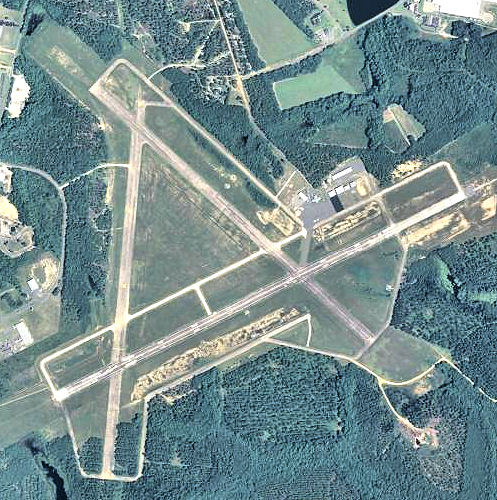
- 2006 USGS airphoto
- IATA: VDI; ICAO: KVDI; FAA LID: VDI

Summary
- Airport type: Public
- Owner: City of Vidalia
- Serves: Vidalia, Georgia
- Location: Vidalia, Georgia
- Elevation AMSL: 274 ft / 84 m
- Coordinates: 32°11′34″N 082°22′16″W
- Website: vidaliaga.gov/airport

Map
- Location of Vidalia Regional Airport

Runways
Direction	Length		Surface
Direction	ft	m	Surface
7/25	6,002	1,829	Concrete
14/32	5,002	1,525	Concrete

Statistics (2022)
- Aircraft operations: 19,100
- Based aircraft: 25
- Source: Federal Aviation Administration

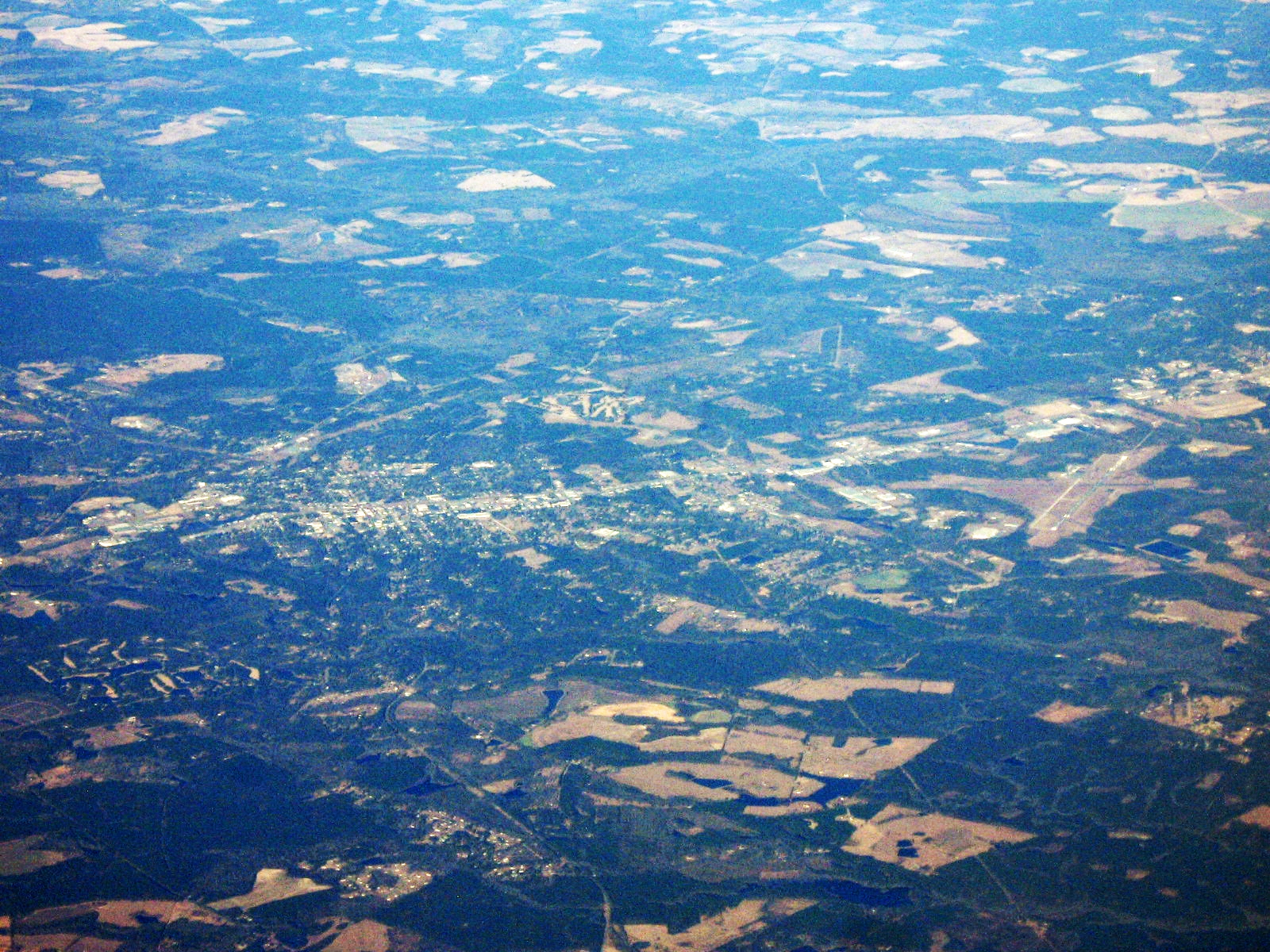
Vidalia, Ga (left) and Vidalia Regional Airport (right).

Vidalia Regional Airport (IATA: VDI, ICAO: KVDI, FAA LID: VDI) is a city-owned public-use airport located three nautical miles (6 km) southeast of the central business district of the city Vidalia, in Toombs County, Georgia, United States.

== Facilities and aircraft ==
Vidalia Regional Airport covers an area of 1,245 acres (504 ha) at an elevation of 274 feet (84 m) above mean sea level. It has two concrete paved runways: 7/25 measuring 6,002 by 100 feet (1,829 x 30 m) and 14/32 measuring 5,002 by 75 feet (1,525 x 46 m).

For the 12-month period ending December 31, 2022, the airport had 19,100 aircraft operations, an average of 52 per day: 92% general aviation and 8% military. At that time there were 25 aircraft based at this airport: 22 single-engine, and 3 multi-engine.

== History ==
The airfield was opened to the public on 12 August 1940. In May 1943, during World War II, the airport was requisitioned by the United States Army Air Forces, and was known as Vidalia-Lyons Army Airfield. Also known as Turner AAF Auxiliary Airfield No. 8, the airfield supported the elementary & advanced training in two-engine aircraft being conducted at Turner AAF.

The airfield inactivated on 28 December 1944, and was declared surplus in 1946.

== See also ==
- Georgia World War II Army Airfields
- List of airports in Georgia (U.S. state)
