= United States Army Air Forces Contract Flying School Airfields =

Flying training schools of the USA Air Forces

USAAF Contract Flying Schools
- Part of Army Air Forces Flying Training Command
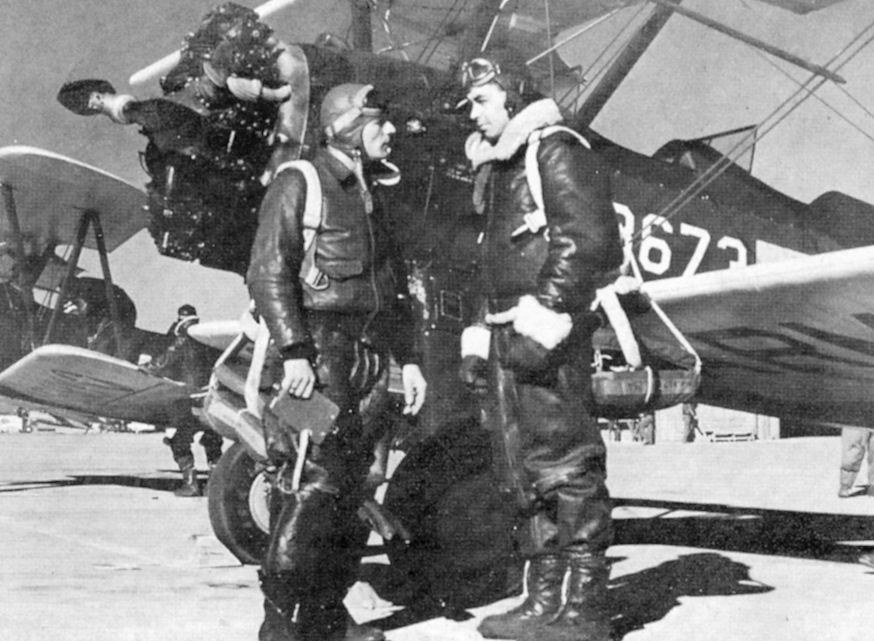
- A flying cadet and his instructor stand next to a PT-17 Stearman at Souther Field, Americus, Georgia.

Site information
- Controlled by: United States Army Air Forces

Site history
- In use: 1939–1945

Garrison information
- Garrison: Army Air Force Training Command

During World War II civilian flying schools, under government contract, provided a considerable part of the flying training effort undertaken by the United States Army Air Forces.

== History ==
With the consolidation of pilot training by the United States Army Air Corps in 1931, nearly all flying training had taken place at Randolph Field, near San Antonio, Texas. During the 1930s, Randolph had produced about 500 new pilots per year, which was adequate for the peacetime air corps. With war clouds gathering in Europe, especially after the 1938 Munich Agreement, General Henry H. Arnold, the Chief of Staff of the Air Corps, realized that the Army was going to have to increase the number of its pilots in case of a general war breaking out again. As a result, Arnold and his command staff developed a plan to supplement the training at Randolph with military pilot training conducted by the civil flight schools in the United States.

=== Prewar years ===
In late 1938, eleven flight schools were contacted by the United States Army Air Corps by Arnold without any funding or Congressional Authorization. Arnold asked if they would, at their own expense, set up facilities to house, feed and train Army pilots. He promised that the Army would pay the schools $1,170 for each pilot that completed a primary flight training course, and $18 per flight hour for each student that washed out. Arnold received a commitment from eight flying schools, accepting his proposal.

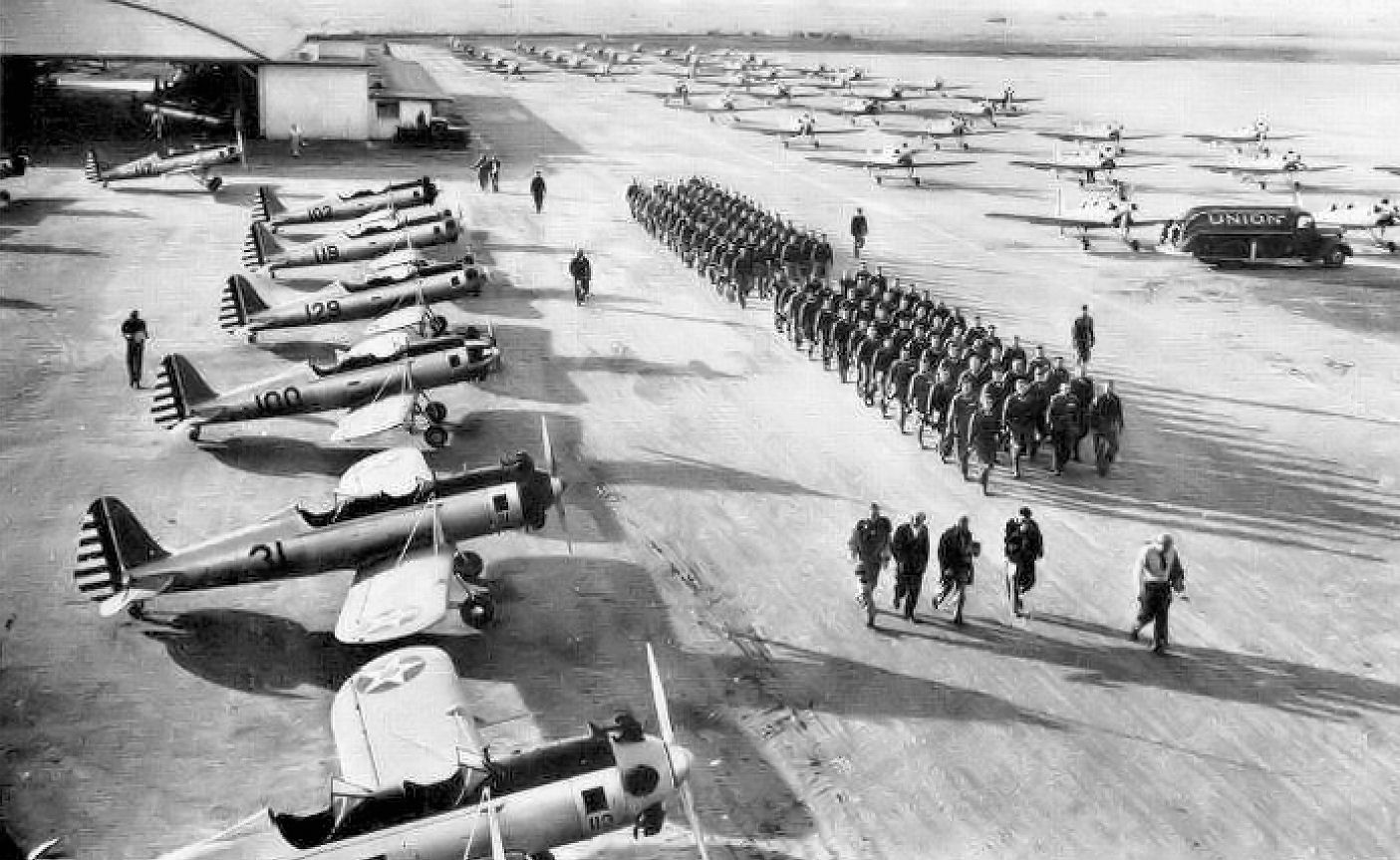
Flight Cadets Marching along Flight Line in front of their Fairchild PT-19 trainers at Sequoia Field in California in 1943. Richard Bong, the United States' highest-scoring air ace in World War II, learned to fly at Sequoia Field in 1942.

In April 1939, Congress authorized $300 million for the Air Corps to procure and maintain 6,000 aircraft. In the authorization, the Air Corps was authorized to enroll Army Flight Cadets in civilian training schools. Moving forward, in June 1939, the War Department approved Arnold's request to organize nine civilian flight schools to train Army pilots. Flight training would begin at most of these schools in July 1939. After the spring offensive by Nazi Germany and the Fall of France in May, 1940, the Army, Arnold increased the rate of pilot training from 4,500 to 7,000 pilots per year. Each of the nine Contract Pilot Schools (CPS) were requested to open an additional school to accommodate this increase. In August 1940, the rate of pilot training was ordered increased to 12,000 per year.

All civil flying instructors had to be certified by the CAA, as well as the ground school instructors and aircraft mechanics. Also flying instructors had to undergo a two-week Army refresher program. In order to exempt the instructors and mechanics from the wartime draft, all were enlisted into the Army as privates in the Army Reserve. Each CPS was commanded by an Army officer (mostly, but not all West Point graduates), who supervised all aspects of the program as well as insuring that military discipline was maintained. Also, a few Air Corps pilots conducted all check rides.

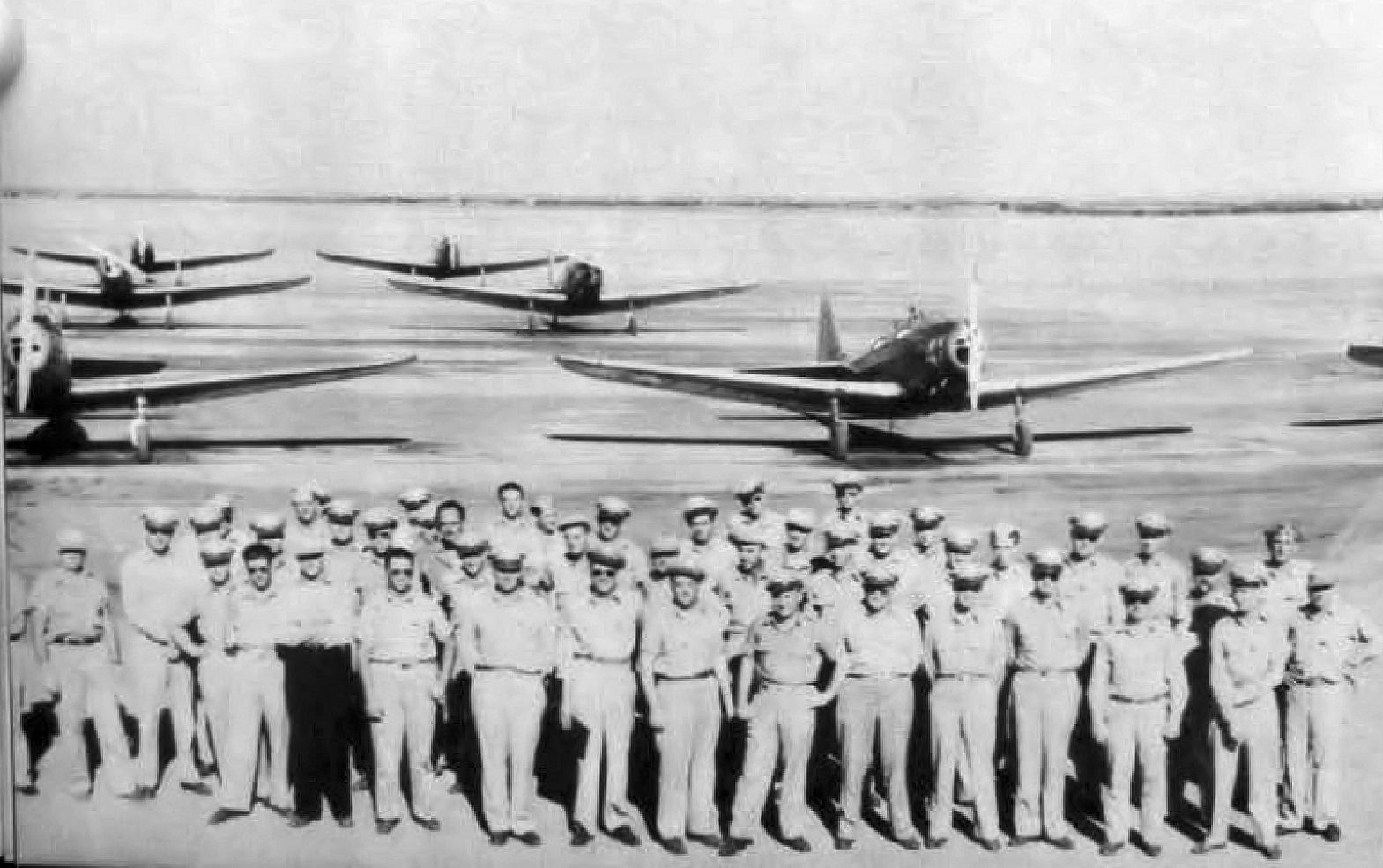
Arledge Field, Texas, 1943. Flight Instructors from the Lou Foote Flying Service stand in front of their Fairchild PT-19 Trainers

However, the existing CPS contractors were unable to expand to train this increased number. In response, the Air Corps issued a request for bid (RFB) to all of the 38 Civil Aeronautics Administration (CAA) approved flying schools in the country outlining the specifications for Army pilot training. From the schools responding to the RFB, the Air Corps selected eleven new contractors for Army primary flight training. With the war in Europe expanding, and the threat of war with the Japanese Empire becoming more and more a possibility, the Chief of Staff of the Army directed Arnold to increase pilot training to 30,000 per year. To meet this new rate, the CPS concept was again expanded by converting three of the Level 1 primary CPS schools to Level 2 basic flying training and expanded the number of CPS contractors.

However, in the strictest sense, these schools were not owned or leased by the USAAF, and for the most part, they were not designated or activated as Army Air Fields. In official Army directories, they were listed by the name of the civilian flying school, the name of the airport on which it operated, or sometimes just by the city name.

In addition to the Air Corps demands for civil flying schools to train military pilots, in late 1940, President Franklin Roosevelt accepted a proposal from British Prime Minister Winston Churchill that the United States train Royal Air Force (RAF) pilots at civilian flying schools. The first RAF flight cadets began training in the United States in June 1941. The Army Air Corps (later Army Air Forces) maintained a small liaison detachment at each of these schools, however the RAF provided a cadre of officers for military supervision and training, while flight training was conducted by contract flying schools.

=== World War II ===
==== Primary Flight Training ====
After the Japanese attack on Pearl Harbor and both Fascist Italy and Nazi Germany's declaration of war against the United States in December 1941, plans were made by the Army to increase the training rate to 50,000, then 70,000 and finally 102,000 pilots per year. The Defense Plant Corporation (DFC) purchased all of the CFS's and leased the facilities back to the civilian contractors. This effectively made them government property, although they continued to be operated by the civilian contractors. The DFC then funded the construction of all future CPSs.

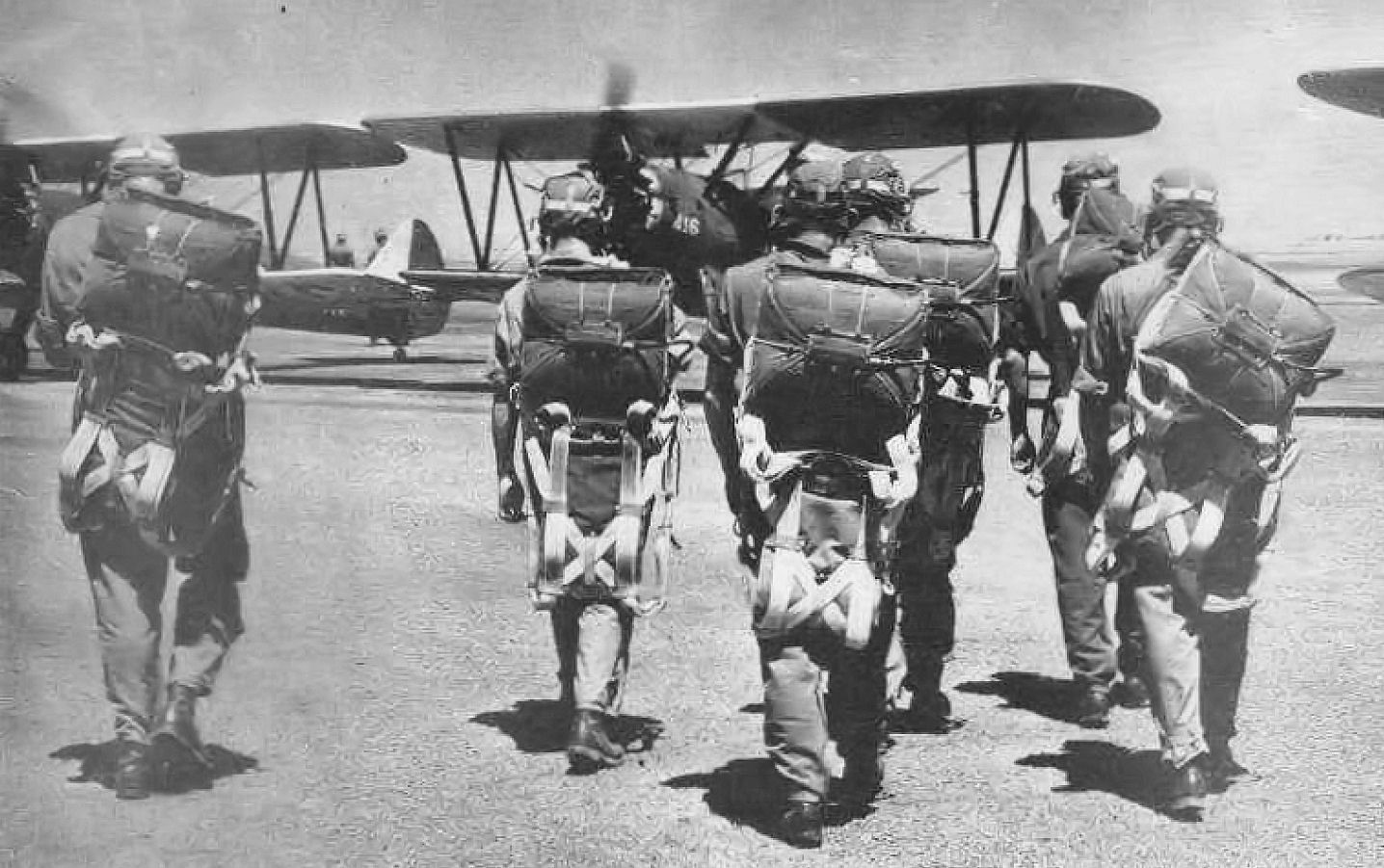
Flight Cadets prepare with their instructors to learn to fly the Boeing PT-17 Stearman at the Rankin Aeronautical Academy, California, 1943.

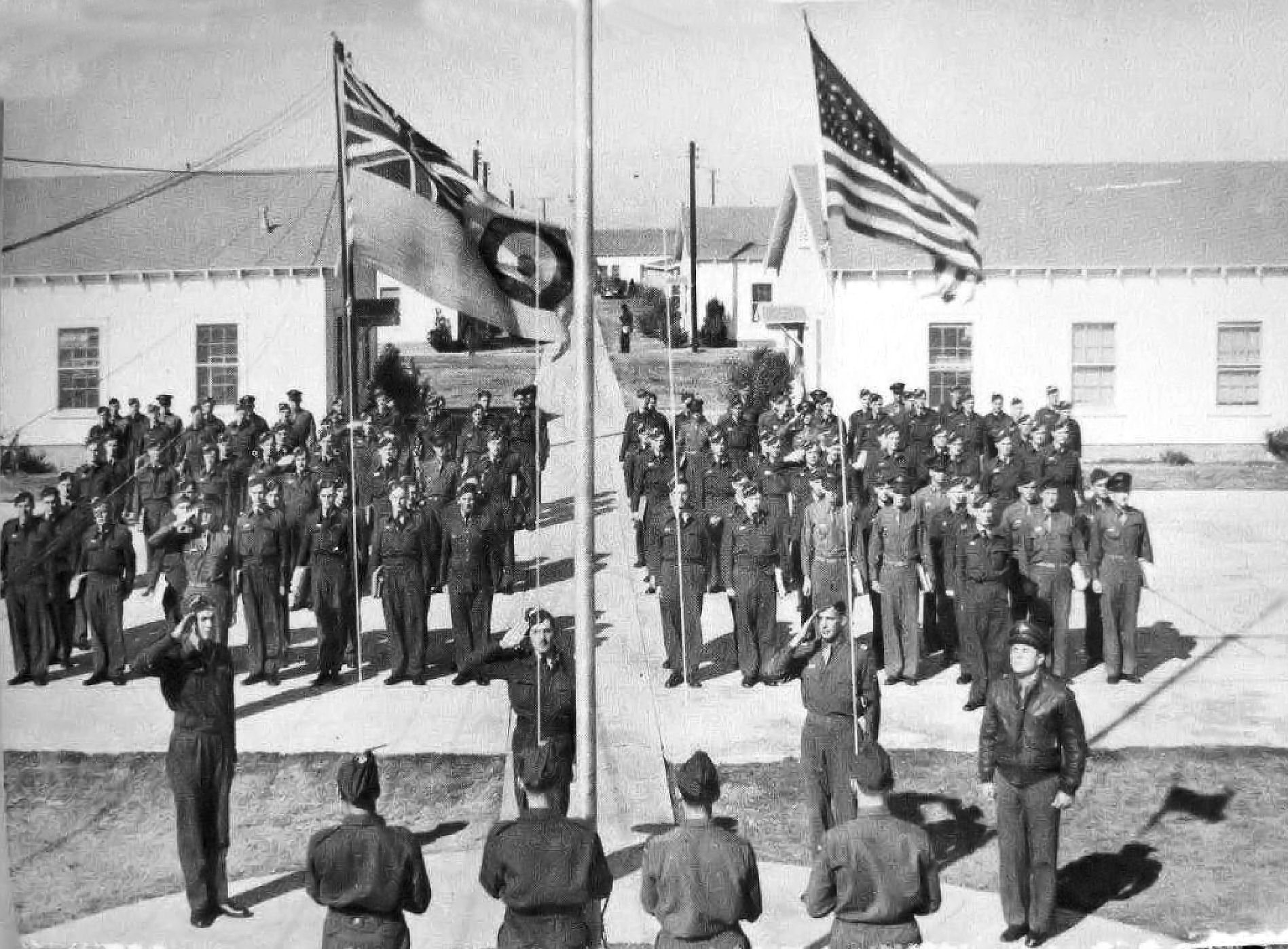
Joint RAF/USAAF Retreat Ceremony at British Flight Training School No. 1, Terrell Municipal Airport, Texas, 1944

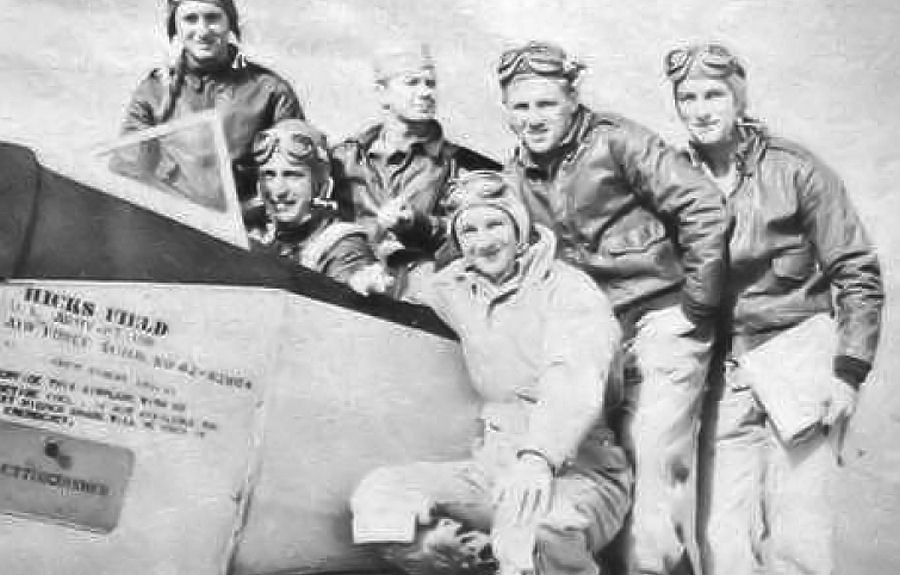
Flight Cadets with their Instructor pose with a Fairchild PT-19 trainer, Hicks Field, Texas, 1942

The CFS's were assigned to the various Flying Training Commands, and each had a designated USAAF Flying Training Detachment assigned for supervision and liaison with the command. According to the contract, the government supplied students with training aircraft, flying clothes, textbooks, and equipment. Schools furnished instructors, training sites and facilities, aircraft maintenance, quarters, and mess halls. To the flying cadets, the CPSs were just another training assignment—although the flight instructors were civilian contractors, the cadets still experienced the discipline and drudgery of military life.

Due to the wartime pressure to produce pilots rapidly the AAF paid scant attention to their military training. The atmosphere of the civilian-operated primary schools was not conducive to the development of rigid discipline, and too little time was available for military instruction at all the stages of pilot training. What instruction there was, over and above the regimen of Army life, was restricted largely to marching, ceremonies, inspections, and military customs and courtesies. The vigorous physical conditioning, however, continued and intensified during flying training.

Trainers used were primarily Fairchild PT-19s, PT-17 Stearmans and Ryan PT-22s, although a wide variety of other types could be found at the airfields. The primary training syllabus was initially twelve weeks in length including 60 hours of flight time and 225 hours of ground training. However this was changed by the Army as the situation required. Although the number of flight hours remained at 60 throughout the war, the demands of the increasing pilot training rate resulted in the primary training to be reduced to ten weeks in 1940, then reduced to nine weeks in 1942.

The instruction given at the CPSs was an adaptation of the primary phase formerly taught at Randolph Field. Each student in primary was required to make at least 175 landings. As given at the height of the effort, primary flying training was divided into four standard phases. In the pre-solo phase students became familiar with the general operation of a light aircraft. In the second, or intermediate phase, pre-solo work was reviewed, and precision of control was developed. The third, or accuracy, phase demanded high proficiency in various types of landing approaches and landings, and the fourth, or acrobatic, phase required ability to perform loops, Immelmann turns, slow rolls, half-rolls, and snap rolls. In 1944, after the training demand had peaked, the course length was increased back to ten weeks.

The Army Air Forces never reached the 102,000 pilot training rate. This was reduced to a more realistic rate of 93,600 in June 1943. The peak of AAF flying training was reached in November 1943 when the CPSs graduated 11,411 cadets. After that AAF flight training began a gradual reduction that resulted in the closing of most of the CPSs in the fall of 1944. Ten CPSs remained in operation in 1945, which were closed at the end of World War II and the Army Air Forces returned to in-house primary pilot training.

==== Glider Pilot Training ====
A subset of the CFS's were Glider Training Schools. Their mission was to train unpowered glider pilots; not powered aircraft pilots. Military Gliders were a new development that began in the 1920s when after the Treaty of Versailles, the German Air Force was disbanded. However, the treaty did not prohibit Germany from having sport gliding clubs, and by the late 1920s, many glider flying clubs had been established throughout the country. When the Nazi Party took over Germany in the early 1930s, the young men in the glider clubs formed the core of the new Luftwaffe. German DFS-230 combat gliders were used in the invasion of Belgium in May 1940 when they landed on top of the Eben Emael Fort and captured it. They were also used in the invasion of Crete. These actions led to the British and later American interest in Combat Gliders and their integration into their armed forces.

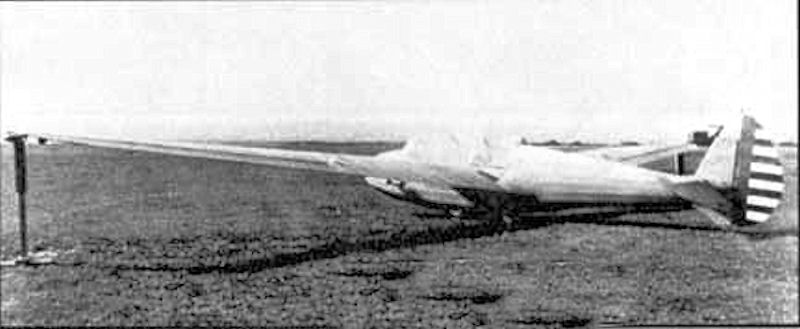
Laister-Kauffman TG-4A Sailplane

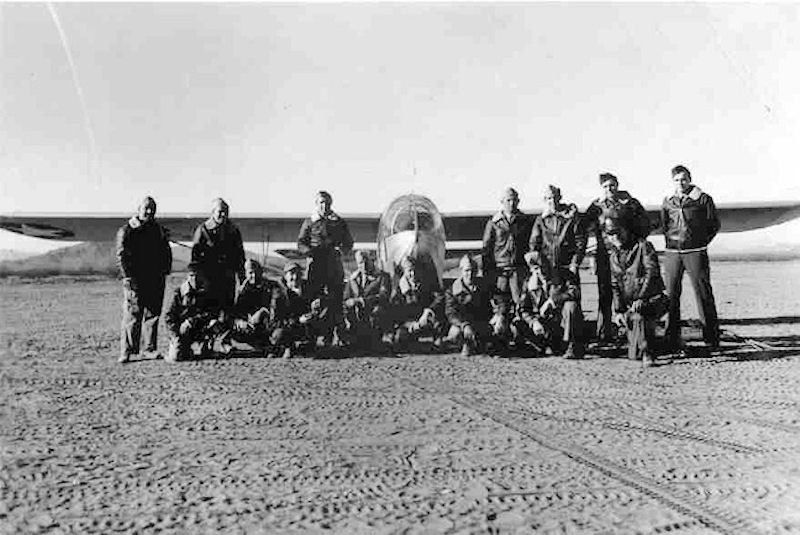
Glider Cadets and a Taylorcraft TG-6A Glider at Echeverria Field, New Mexico, 1943

In 1941 the Air Corps directed Flying Training Command to establish a glider training program, however given the Army's inexperience, it was decided to utilize civilian glider and soaring schools in a similar manner to the primary powered flight program. Many glider pilots were already qualified and skilled powered aircraft pilots who had earned their CAA (Civil Aeronautic Administration) civilian pilot's license before war broke out. Other trainees for the glider pilot program had already gone through flight training but had been disqualified, not for lack of skill, but for problems beyond their control such as slightly deficient eyesight.

The main operation got under way at Twenty Nine Palms Army Airfield, in the California desert, where thermal conditions were great for soaring flights. A facility, named Condor Field, was utilized with C-47 Skytrains flown by Women Airforce Service Pilots (WASP)s being used as tow tugs for the gliders, with Laister-Kauffman TG-4A sailplanes used for glider training.

However, it was learned that the military gliders under development were fundamentally different in their flight characteristics than sailplanes in their handling, and especially the fact that once released, a military glider did not soar as a sailplane does. The combat gliders under development could not soar and gain altitude once the pilot released the tow line as a sailplane could. They could only descend, and once a pilot committed to a landing and discovered, as he got closer, that the landing zone was under fire, mined, or otherwise obstructed, he had little room to maneuver to make a safe landing.

As a result, the TG-4A sailplanes were replaced by Aeronca TG-5As, Taylorcraft TG-6As, and Piper TG-8As unpowered glider conversions of powered light observation aircraft which had similar characteristics to the military gliders under development. As part of the training program, cadets learned to perform maintenance and, in an emergency, to rebuild wrecked gliders. This was a relatively simple operation, considering that the primary glider consisted of little more than a shell, equipped with radio, wheels, and brakes.

The schools at Twentynine Palms, CA, Mobile, AL, Wickenburg, AZ, and Lamesa, TX, were the first Glider Training Schools to open. Once the Glider Pilot Cadet successfully completed their primary training, they moved on to advanced training, taught by AAF instructors at several military glider schools using the CG-4A Waco and British Airspeed Horsas that the pilots would eventually fly into combat during several operations primarily in the European Theater.

Once in operational Troop Carrier squadrons, the gliders and their pilots were initially established as separate flights in the squadron organization. However, in late 1943, it was decided that having a separate glider force within the Troop Carrier squadrons, it was decided to end the separate glider instruction program and integrate the glider flying and maintenance training program into the Troop Carrier training program. The contract Glider Schools were subsequently closed or converted into Primary Flight Schools and all glider training was conducted by military glider pilot instructors at schools at Army Air Bases.

=== Closure ===
During the course of the war, the schools graduated approximately 250,000 student pilots. All of the CFS's were inactivated by the end of the war, and were either turned over to the War Assets Administration (WAA) for disposal, or sold back to their previous private owners. Most today are small general aviation airports; some are major municipal airports, and some were abandoned with little or no evidence of their existence.

== List of Contract Flying Schools ==
=== Eastern Flying Training Command ===
29th Flying Training Wing

- Albany Army Airfield, Albany Georgia

52d Flying Training Detachment
Operated by: Darr Aero-Tech Primary Flying School

- Augustine Field, Madison, Mississippi

62d Flying Training Detachment
Operated by: Mississippi Institute of Aeronautics

- Avon Park Army Airfield, Avon Park, Florida

61st Flying Training Detachment
Operated by: Lodwick Aviation Military Academy

- Carlstrom Field, Arcadia, Florida

53d Flying Training Detachment
2148th Army Air Forces Base Unit (Contract Pilot School, Primary), April 1944
Operated by: Embry-Riddle Company

- Chester Field, McBride, Missouri

74th Flying Training Detachment
Operated by: Anderson Air Activities

- Decatur Airport, Decatur, Alabama

65th Flying Training Detachment
Operated by: Southern Regional Airways, Inc

- 63rd Army Air Forces Contract Pilot School, Douglas, Georgia

63d Flying Training Detachment
Operated by: South Georgia College

- Dorr Field, Arcadia, Florida

54th Flying Training Detachment
Operated by: Embry-Riddle Company

- Fletcher Field, Clarksdale, Mississippi

69th Flying Training Detachment
Operated by: Clarksdale School of Aviation

- Harrell Field, Camden, Arkansas

59th Flying Training Detachment
Operated by: Wiggings-Marden Aero Corp

- Harris Army Airfield, Cape Giardeau, Missouri

73d Flying Training Detachment
Operated by: Cape Institute of Aeronautics, Inc

- Hawthorne School of Aeronautics, Orangeburg, South Carolina

58th Flying Training Detachment
2162d Army Air Forces Base Unit (Contract Pilot School, Primary), April 1944
Hawthorne School of Aeronautics

- Lodwick Field, Lakeland, Florida

61st Flying Training Detachment
2160th Army Air Forces Base Unit (Contract Pilot School, Primary), April 1944
Operated by: Lodwick School of Aeronautics

- Lafayette Airport, Lafayette, Louisiana

70th Flying Training Detachment
Lafayette School of Aeronautics

- McKellar Field, Jackson, Tennessee

68th Flying Training Detachment
Operated by: Georgia Air Services, Incorporated

- Moton Field, Tuskegee, Alabama

66th Flying Training Detachment
2564th Army Air Forces Base Unit (Contract Pilot School, Primary) (Colored), April 1944
Operated by: Tuskegee Institute

- Palmer Field, Bennettsville, South Carolina

53d Flying Training Detachment
Operated by: Georgia Air Service, Incorporated and Southeastern Air Service, Incorporated

- Souther Field, Americus, Georgia

56th Flying Training Detachment
Operated by: Graham Aviation Co.

- Taylor Field, Ocala, Florida

57th Flying Training Detachment
Operated by: Greenville Aviation School

- Thompson-Robbins Field, Helena, Arkansas

59th Flying Training Detachment
Operated by: Helena Aerotech

- Van de Graaff Field, Tuscaloosa, Alabama

51st Flying Training Detachment
Operated by: Alabama Institute of Aeronautics, Inc

- Woodward Field, Camden, South Carolina

64th Flying Training Detachment
Operated by: Southern Aviation School

Glider Training Schools

- Antigo Airport, Antigo, Wisconsin

14th Glider Training Detachment
Pre-Glider/Primary Training School
Operated by: Anderson Air Activities

- Bates Field, Mobile Alabama

18th Glider Training Detachment
Basic Glider Training School
Operated by: Mobile Area Soaring Corp.

- Greenville Municipal Airport, Greenville, South Carolina

48th Glider Training Detachment
Elementary/Advanced Training School
Operated by: Southern Airways, Inc.

- Grand Forks Airport, Grand Forks, North Dakota

24th Glider Training Detachment
Pre-Glider/Primary Training School
Operated by: Jolly Flying Service

- Kirkwood Field, Crookston, Minnesota

33D Glider Training Detachment
Pre-Glider/Primary Training School
Operated by: L. Millar-Wittig

- Lobb Field, Rochester, Minnesota

32d Glider Training Detachment
Pre-Glider/Primary Training School
Operated by: Fontana School of Aeronautics

- Stillwater Airport, Stillwater, Minnesota

34th Glider Training Detachment
Pre-Glider/Primary Training School
Operated by: North Aviation Company

- Monticello Field, Monticello, Minnesota

35th Glider Training Detachment
Pre-Glider/Primary Training School
Operated by: Hinck Flying Service, Inc.

=== Central Flying Training Command ===
31st Flying Training Wing

- Arledge Field, Stamford, Texas

308th Flying Training Detachment
Operated by: Stamford Flying School and Lou Foote Flying Service and Coleman Flying School

- Avenger Field, Sweetwater, Texas

319th Flying Training Detachment
2563d Army Air Forces Base Unit (Women Air Service Pilots), April 1944
Operated by: Aviation Enterprises. Conducted Primary, Basic and Advanced (WASP) training

- Bruce Field, Ballinger, Texas

306th Flying Training Detachment
Operated by: Fred Harmon Flying School

- Chickasha Municipal Airport, Chickasha, Oklahoma

316th Flying Training Detachment
2549th Army Air Forces Base Unit (Contract Pilot School, Primary), April 1944
Operated by: Wilson-Bonfils Flying School

- Cimarron Field, Oklahoma City, Oklahoma

310th Flying Training Detachment
Operated by: Oklahoma Air College

- Coleman Municipal Airport, Coleman, Texas

304th Flying Training Detachment
Operated by: Coleman FLying School, Limited

- Corsicana Field, Corsicana, Texas

301st Flying Training Detachment
Operated by: Air Activities of Texas

- Cuero Municipal Airport, Cuero, Texas

303d Flying Training Detachment
Operated by: Brayton Flying Services, Inc.

- Fort Stockton Field, Fort Stockton, Texas

313th Flying Training Detachment
Operated by: Pacific Air School Limited

- Garner Field, Uvalde, Texas

305th Flying Training Detachment
2566th Army Air Forces Base Unit (Contract Pilot School, Primary), April 1944
Operated by: Hangar Six, Incorporated

- Grider Field, Pine Bluff, Arkansas

312th Flying Training Detachment
Operated by: Pine Bluff School of Aviation

- Harvey Parks Airport, Sikeston, Missouri

311th Flying Training Detachment
Operated by: Missouri Institute of Aeronautics

- Hatbox Field, Muskogee, Oklahoma

315th Flying Training Detachment
Operated by Spartan Aircraft Company and Spartan School of Aeronautics

- Hicks Field, Fort Worth, Texas

307th Flying Training Detachment
Operated by: Texas Aviation School and W. F. Long Flying School.

- Jones Field, Bonham, Texas

302d Flying Training Detachment
Operated by: Bonham Aviation School

- Miami Municipal Airport, Miami, Oklahoma

322d Flying Training Detachment
Operated by: Spartan School of Aeronautics

- Mustang Field, El Reno, Oklahoma

320th Flying Training Detachment
Operated by: Midwest Air School

- Parks Metropolitan Airport, East St. Louis, Illinois

309th Flying Training Detachment
Operated by: Parks Air College

- Ponca City Municipal Airport, Ponca City, Oklahoma

323d Flying Training Detachment
Operated by: Darr School of Aeronautics

- Terrell Municipal Airport, Terrell, Texas

321st Flying Training Detachment
Operated by: Terell Aviation School, Limited

- Tulsa Municipal Airport, Tulsa, Oklahoma

314th Flying Training Detachment
Operated by: Spartan School of Aeronautics

- Victory Field, Vernon, Texas

317th Flying Training Detachment
Operated by: Hunter Flying Service and Richey Flying Service.

Glider Training Schools

- Aberdeen Regional Airport, Aberdeen, South Dakota

26th Glider Training Detachment
Pre-Glider/Primary Training School
Operated by: Anderson & Brennan Flying Service

- Eberts Field, Lonoke, Arkansas

15th Glider Training Detachment
Pre-Glider/Primary Training School
Operated by: Kenneth Starnes Flying Service

- Renner Field, Goodland, Kansas

22d Glider Training Detachment
Pre-Glider/Primary Training School
Operated by: William A. Ong

- Hale County Airport, Plainview, Texas

4th Glider Training Detachment
Pre-Glider/Primary Training School
Operated by: Clint Breedlove Aerial Service

- Hartlee Field Airport, Denton, Texas

17th Glider Training Detachment
Basic Glider Training School
Operated by: Harte Flying Service

- Hays Airport, Hays, Kansas

19th Glider Training Detachment
Pre-Glider/Primary Training School
Operated by: Morey Airplane Company

- Janesville Field, Janesville, Wisconsin

16th Glider Training Detachment
Pre-Glider/Primary Training School
Operated by: Bonham Aviation School

- Okmulgee Municipal Airport, Okmulgee, Oklahoma

25th Glider Training Detachment
Pre-Glider/Primary Training School
Operated by: Sooner Air Training Corp.

- Pittsburg Airport, Pittsburg, Kansas

21st Glider Training Detachment
Pre-Glider/Primary Training School
Operated by: McFarland Flying Service

- Spencer Municipal Airport, Spencer, Iowa

23d Glider Training Detachment
Pre-Glider/Primary Training School
Operated by: Hunter Flying Service
Hunter Flying Service moved from Spencer, Iowa, to Hamilton Airport at Hamilton, Texas, on 20 October 1942.

- Theldor Airfield, Vinita, Oklahoma

27th Glider Training Detachment
Pre-Glider/Primary Training School
Operated by: Burke Aviation Service

=== Western Flying Training Command ===
36th Flying Training Wing

- Dos Palos Airport, Firebaugh/Dos Palos, California

13th Flying Training Detachment
Operated by: Coast Aviation Corporation

- Falcon Field, Mesa, Arizona

15th Flying Training Detachment
3044th Army Air Forces Base Unit (Contract Pilot School, Primary), April 1944
Southwest Airways Co

- Gary Field, Riverside, California

10th Flying Training Detachment
Operated by: Morton Mfg. Company/Morton Air Academy

- Grand Central Airport, Glendale, California

9th Flying Training Detachment
Operated by: Cal-Aero Academy

- Lone Pine Airport, Lone Pine, California

16th Flying Training Detachment
Operated by: Lone Pine Academy

- Ontario Army Airfield, Ontario, California

7th Flying Training Detachment
Operated by: Cal-Aero Academy

- Oxnard Army Airfield, Oxnard, California

14th Flying Training Detachment
3043d Army Air Forces Base Unit (Contract Pilot School, Primary), April 1944
Operated by: Mira Loma Flight Academy

- Palo Alto Airport, King City, California

3d Flying Training Detachment
Operated by: Palo Alto School of Aviation Airport

- Rankin Field, Tulare, California

4th Flying Training Detachment
3050th Army Air Forces Base Unit (Contract Pilot School, Primary), April 1944
Operated by: Rankin Aeronautical Academy

- Hemet-Ryan Airport, Hemet, California

5th Flying Training Detachment
Operated by Ryan School of Aeronautics

- Ryan Airfield, Tucson, Arizona

11th Flying Training Detachment
Operated by: Ryan School of Aeronautics

- Sequoia Field, Visalia, California

8th Flying Training Detachment
Operated by: Visalia-Dinuba School of Aeronautics

- Santa Maria Army Airfield, Santa Maria, California

1st Flying Training Detachment
Operated by: Hancock College of Aeronautics

- Thunderbird Field No. 1, Phoenix, Arizona

12th Flying Training Detachment
3040th Army Air Forces Base Unit (Contract Pilot School, Primary), April 1944
Operated by: Southwest Airways

- Thunderbird Field No. 2, Scottsdale, Arizona

6th Flying Training Detachment
Operated by: Thunderbird Corporation

- Twenty Nine Palms Army Airfield, Twenty-Nine Palms, California

17th Flying Training Detachment
Operated by: Twenty-Nine Palms Air Academy

- War Eagle Field, Lancaster, California

18th Flying Training Detachment
Operated by: Polaris Flight Academy

Glider Training Schools

- Artesia Municipal Airport, Artesia, New Mexico

11th Glider Training Detachment
Basic/Advanced Glider Training School
Operated by: Big Spring Flying Service

- Big Spring Army Glider Training School, Big Spring, Texas

28th Glider Training Detachment
Pre-Glider/Primary Training School
Operated by: Big Spring Flying Service

- Echeverria Field, Wickenburg, Arizona.

Opened initially as Wickenburg Airport
5th Glider Training Detachment
Basic Glider Training School
Operated by: Arizona Gliding Academy
Converted to Primary flight training school in March 1943, re-named Echeverria Field
20th Flying Training Detachment
Operated by Claiborne Flight Academy

- Condor Field, Twenty-Nine Palms, California

6th Glider Training Detachment
Basic Glider Training School
Operated by: Twenty-Nine Palms Air Academy

- Fort Morgan Municipal Airport, Fort Morgan, Colorado

1st Glider Training Detachment
Pre-Glider/Primary Training School
Operated by: Plains Airways, Inc

- Lamesa Army Airfield, Lamesa, Texas

29th Glider Training Detachment
Pre-Glider/Primary Training School
Operated by: Clint Breedlove Aerial Service

- Tucumcari Municipal Airport, Tucumcari, New Mexico

9th Glider Training Detachment
Elementary/Advanced Training School
Operated by: Cutter-Carr Flying Service

=== British Flight Training Schools ===
Royal Air Force flying cadets used the PT-17 or PT-19; the BT-13 and AT-6 for their training in the United States. Unlike the Army Air Forces, RAF cadets remained at the same airfield for all three levels of their training.

Following the attack on Pearl Harbor, The Army Air Corps determined that the schools should double from the 50 students input, to 100 students, and that 20% of :the class would be USAAC cadets. Also, that the USAAC would take the BT-13 aircraft, and increase the PT-17's and AT-6's. Also the course would increase to 200 hours. This was eventually adopted by the USAAF beginning in the fall of 1944.

- British Flight Training School No. 1

321st Flying Training Detachment (31st FTW)
2564th Army Air Forces Base Unit (Contract Pilot School Primary/Advanced), April 1944
Terrell Municipal Airport, Texas
Operated by: Dallas Aviation School

- British Flight Training School No. 2

14th Flying Training Detachment (36th FTW)
3043d Army Air Forces Base Unit (Contract Pilot School Primary/Advanced), April 1944
War Eagle Field, Lancaster, California
Operated by: Polaris Flight Academy

- British Flight Training School No. 3

322d Flying Training Detachment (31st FTW)
2565th Army Air Forces Base Unit (Contract Pilot School Primary/Advanced), April 1944
Miami Municipal Airport, Oklahoma
Operated by: Spartan School

- British Flight Training School No. 4

15th Flying Training Detachment (36th FTW)
3052d Army Air Forces Base Unit (Contract Pilot School Primary/Advanced), April 1944
Falcon Field, Mesa, Arizona
Operated by: Southwest Airways

- British Flight Training School No. 5

75th Flying Training Detachment (29th FTW)
2155th Army Air Forces Base Unit (Contract Pilot School Primary/Advanced), April 1944
Riddle Field, Clewiston, Florida
Operated by: Embry-Riddle Aero School

- British Flight Training School No. 6

323d Flying Training Detachment (31st FTW)
2542d Army Air Forces Base Unit (Contract Pilot School Primary/Advanced), April 1944
Ponca City Airport, Oklahoma
Operated by: Darr School

- British Flight Training School No. 7

318th Flying Training Detachment (31st FTW)
Open June 16–August 18, 1942, assets dispersed afterwards
Sweetwater Municipal Airport, Sweetwater, Texas
Operated by: Aviation Enterprises, Ltd.
Last class, from #2 BFTS, Lancaster, California, transferred to Sweetwater,
Aircraft, 51 students, and RAF Staff. Students further displaced to
other BFTS schools, in August, 1942.
