= KMNZ =

KMNZ may refer to:

- the ICAO code for Hamilton Municipal Airport (Texas), in Hamilton, Texas, United States
- KMNZ-LD, a low-power television station (channel 31, virtual 4) licensed to serve Coeur d'Alene, Idaho, United States
- KMNZ-LP, a defunct low-power television station (channel 38) formerly licensed to serve Coeur d'Alene, Idaho
