= KTRL =

KTRL may refer to:

- Terrell Municipal Airport (ICAO code KTRL)
- KTRL (FM), a radio station (90.5 FM) licensed to Tarleton State University in Stephenville, Texas, United States
