= Twentynine Palms Airport =

Airport in San Bernardino County, California

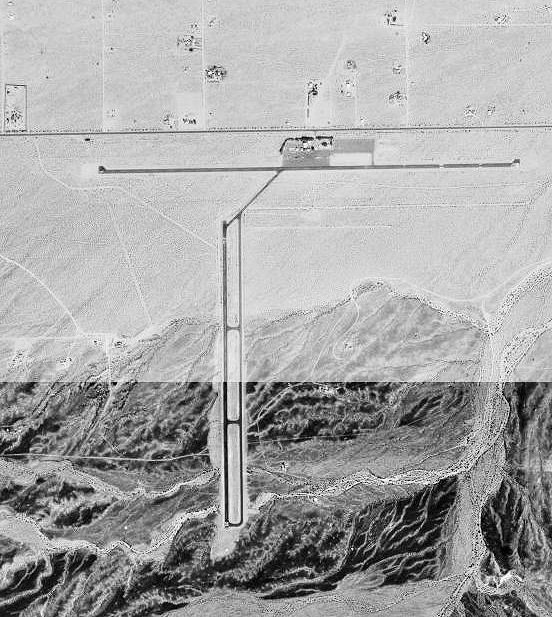
- USGS aerial image, 3 October 1995
- IATA: TNP; ICAO: KTNP; FAA LID: TNP

Summary
- Airport type: Public
- Owner: County of San Bernardino
- Serves: Twentynine Palms, California
- Elevation AMSL: 1,888 ft / 575 m
- Coordinates: 34°07′54″N 115°56′45″W
- Interactive map of Twentynine Palms Airport

Runways
Direction	Length		Surface
Direction	ft	m	Surface
8/26	5,531	1,686	Asphalt
17/35	3,797	1,157	Asphalt

Statistics (2022)
- Aircraft operations (year ending 2/28/2022): 18,000
- Based aircraft: 14
- Source: Federal Aviation Administration

Twentynine Palms Airport (IATA: TNP, ICAO: KTNP, FAA LID: TNP) is a public use airport located six nautical miles (11 km) east of the central business district of Twentynine Palms, a city in San Bernardino County, California, United States. It is owned by the County of San Bernardino.

== History ==
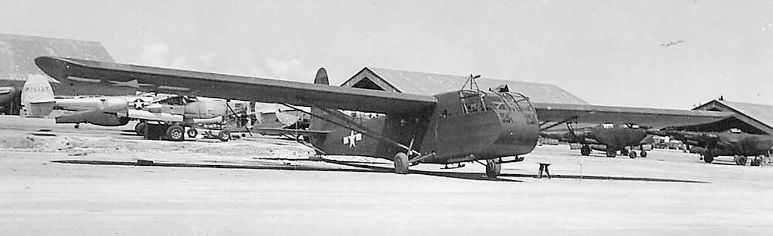
Twenty Nine Palms Air Academy with a Waco CG-4A in 1942

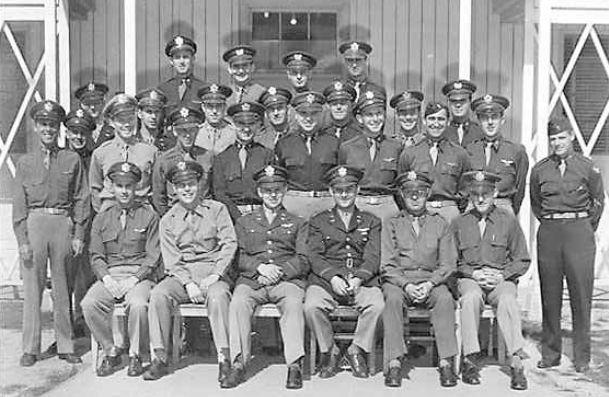
Army Air Force glider pilots at Twentynine Palms AirAcademy in July 1941

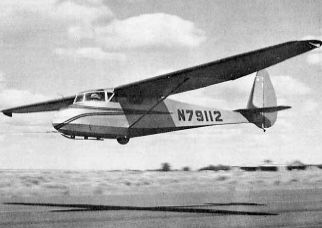
Twentynine Palms AirAcademy TG-1A glider a training glider a Frankfort Cinema with the Army designation TG-1

It was activated on 1 January 1942 by the United States Army Air Forces. It started as USAAF contract glider training, and was called Twenty-Nine Palms Air Academy until 16 February 1943. It had four axillary airfields in local area, including Condor Field. Flying training was performed with Fairchild PT-19s as the primary trainer. It also had several PT-17 Stearmans and a few P-40 Warhawks assigned. It conducted basic flying training from March 1943 until being transferred to United States Navy April 1944. General Henry H. Arnold, Chief of the Army Air Forces, ordered the training for 150 glider pilots for World War II. By the end of WW2 over 6,000 glider pilots had been trained. In all 1,654 of the glider pilots were trained at the Twentynine Palms Air Academy. It was under USN control and became an auxiliary airfield to NAS San Diego.

== Facilities and aircraft ==
Twentynine Palms Airport covers an area of 480 acres (190 ha) at an elevation of 1,888 feet (575 m) above mean sea level. It has two asphalt paved runways: 8/26 is 5,531 by 75 feet (1,686 x 23 m) and 17/35 is 3,797 by 50 feet (1,157 x 15 m).

For the 12-month period ending February 28, 2022, the airport had 18,000 aircraft operations, an average of 49 per day: 97% general aviation and 3% military. At that time there were 14 aircraft based at this airport: 10 single-engine, 1 multi-engine and 3 glider.

== See also ==
- California World War II Army Airfields
- 36th Flying Training Wing (World War II)
- United States Army Air Forces Contract Flying School Airfields
- IX Troop Carrier Command

== Other sources ==
- This article incorporates public domain material from the Air Force Historical Research Agency
- Manning, Thomas A. (2005), History of Air Education and Training Command, 1942–2002. Office of History and Research, Headquarters, AETC, Randolph AFB, Texas OCLC 71006954, 29991467
- Shaw, Frederick J. (2004), Locating Air Force Base Sites, History’s Legacy, Air Force History and Museums Program, United States Air Force, Washington DC. OCLC 57007862, 1050653629
