= Arledge Field =

Airport in Jones County, Texas

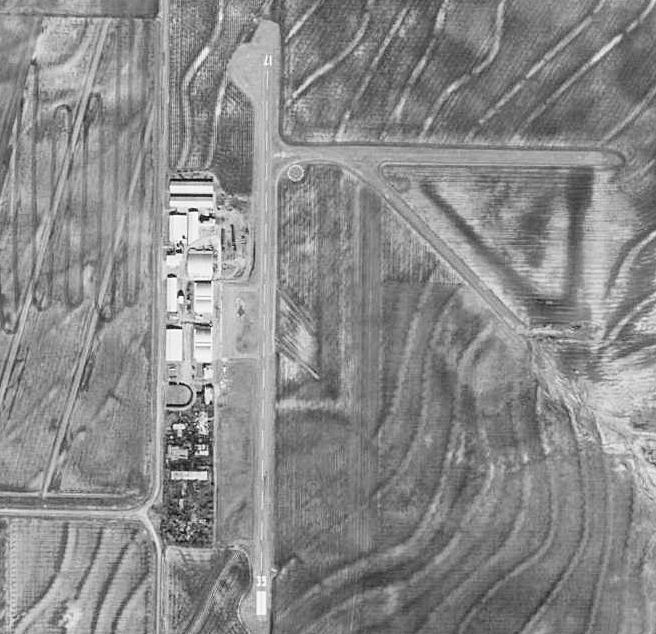
- 1995 USGS Photo
- IATA: none; ICAO: none

Summary
- Airport type: Public
- Owner: City of Stamford
- Location: Jones County, near Stamford, Texas
- Elevation AMSL: 1,561 ft / 475 m
- Coordinates: 32°54′33″N 099°44′09″W
- Interactive map of Arledge Field

Runways
Direction	Length		Surface
Direction	ft	m	Surface
17/35	3,705	1,129	Asphalt

Arledge Field (FAA LID: F56) is a public general aviation airport located approximately 4 miles (6.4 km) east of Stamford, Texas. Owned by the city of Stamford, it provides general aviation service. Approximately 80 aircraft use the airport on a weekly basis.

== History ==
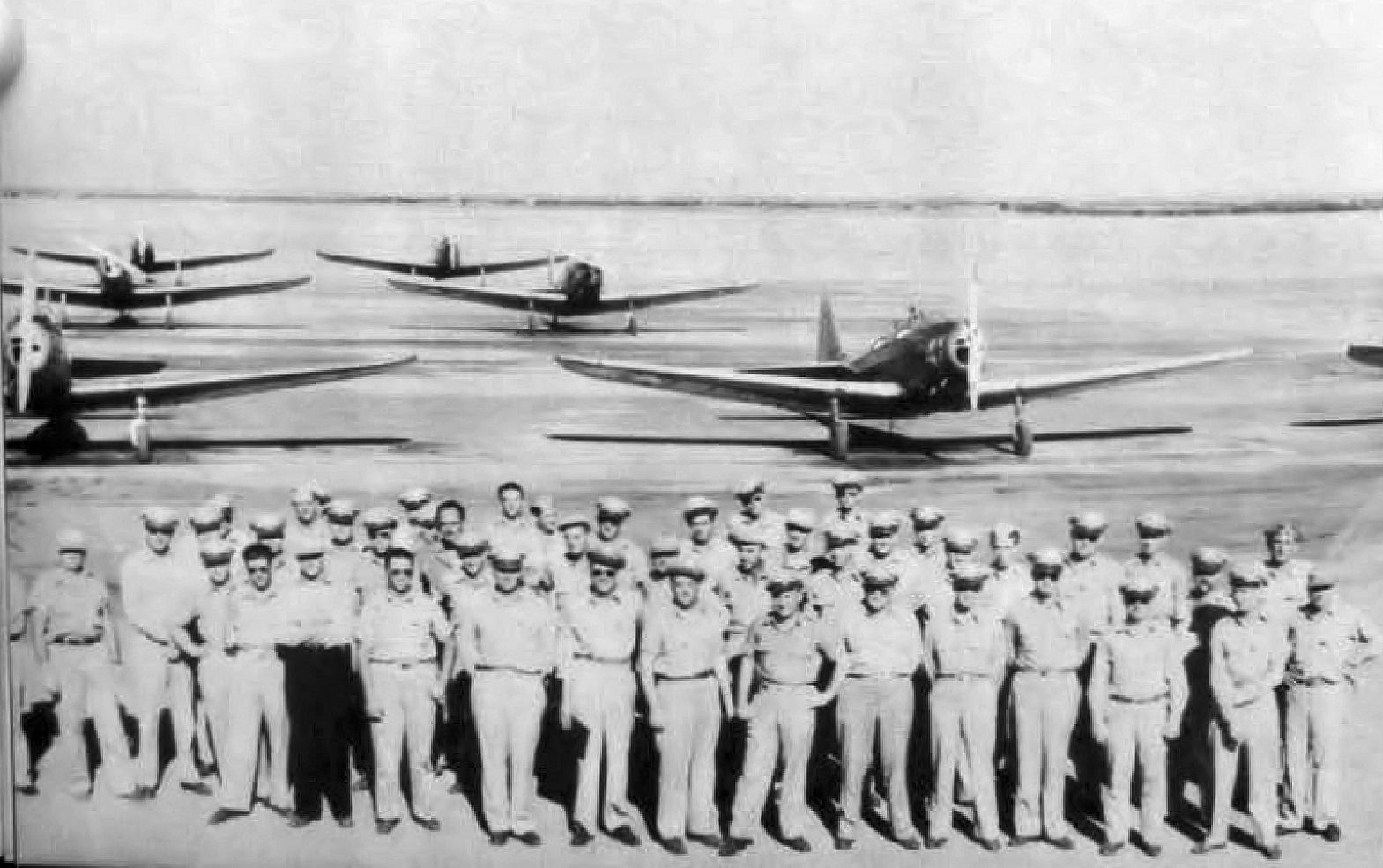
Fairchild PT-19 aircraft and Flight Instructors at Arledge Field

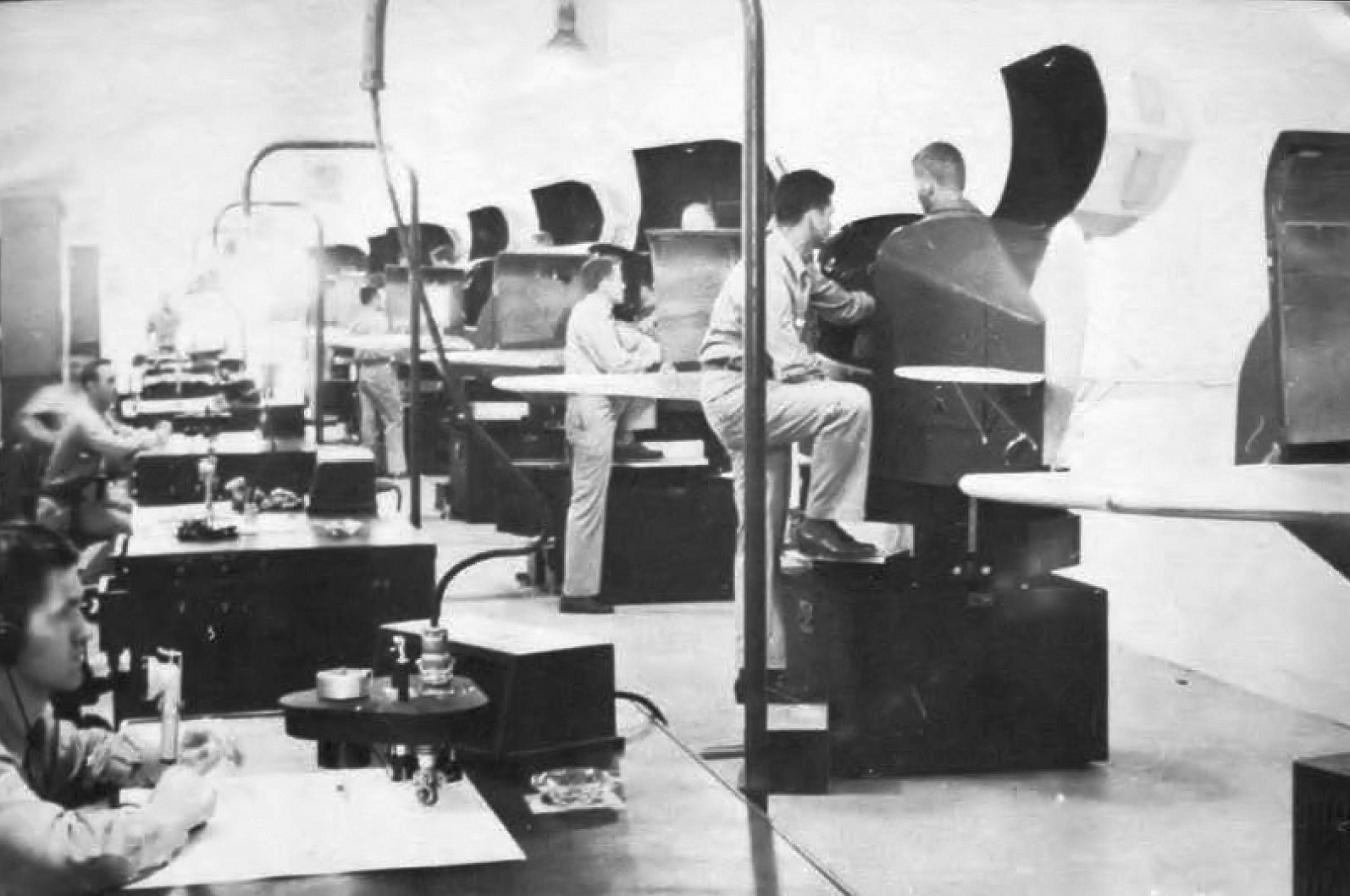
Link Ground Trainers at Arledge Field

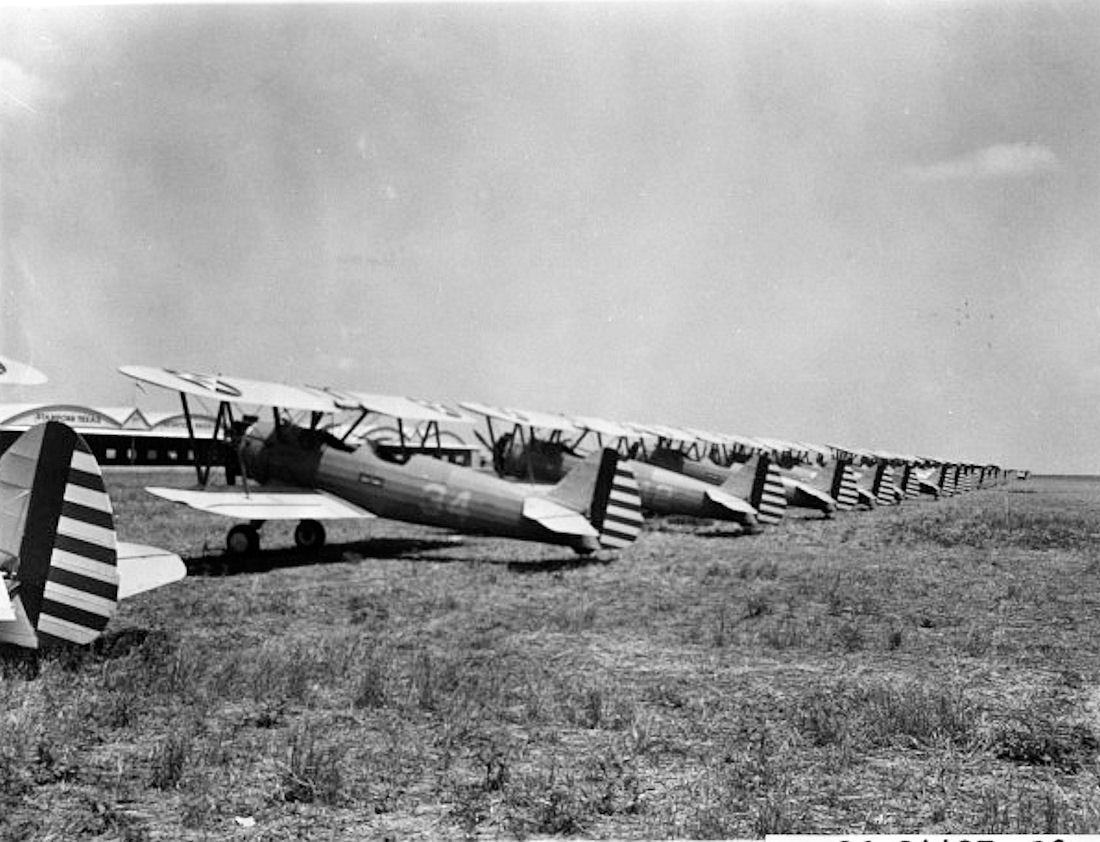
Boeing PT-17 Stermans parked at Arledge Field

In preparation for the eventual U.S. entry into World War II, the United States Army Air Corps sought to expand the nation's combat air forces by asking civilian flight schools to provide the primary phase of training for air cadets. Consequently, it contracted with nine civilian flying schools to provide primary flying training, with the graduates being moved on to basic and advanced training at regular military training airfields.

The City of Stamford responded by buying a section of land that was once part of Swante Magnus Swenson's SMS Ranch to be used for an air field. It was named for Stamford businessman Roy Wade Arledge, who headed the committee to purchase the site in December 1940. Construction of Arledge Field facilities began in early spring of 1941 under agreement with the first training contractor, the Lou Foote Flying Service of Grand Prairie, Texas.

Opened on 1 April 1941, the school was known as Arledge Field or Stamford-Arledge Field, and it was assigned to United States Army Air Forces Gulf Coast Training Center (later Central Flying Training Command) 31st Flying Training Wing as a primary (level 1) pilot training airfield. Military personnel from the 308th Army Air Forces Training Detachment provided a military garrison.

The airfield had four hard surface runways for landings and takeoffs. In addition to the main airfield, Arledge Field also had four auxiliary airfields in the Stamford area for emergency landings and overflows. Various facilities to serve as barracks, recreation dayrooms, dining facilities, classrooms, exercise fields and other buildings would be constructed and used for military training and indoctrination, commanded by an Air Corps officer and staff.

Air Cadets were trained on PT-17 Stearman and Fairchild PT-19 aircraft. The training provided by civilian flying schools included 65 hours of flying instruction in addition to the standard ground school curriculum provided by the Air Corps.

Arledge Field was inactivated on 8 September 1944 with the drawdown of AAFTC's pilot training program, and the final cadet class at Arledge Field graduated on September 30, 1944. With its closure, the facility was declared surplus and turned over to the Army Corps of Engineers on 30 September 1945. It was turned over to the War Assets Administration (WAA), and in 1947 was transferred to the city of Stamford for use as a civil airport.

Today, Arledge Field retains much of its military past. There are two World War II double hangars and a large wartime single hangar that remain in use. The Army Air Force parade ground remains, with a USAAF star visible on the grounds. In addition, numerous concrete foundations of wartime buildings remain visible in aerial photography.

== See also ==
- List of airports in Texas
- Texas World War II Army Airfields
- 31st Flying Training Wing (World War II)
