= Hale County Airport =

Airport in Texas

Hale County Airport Plainview Field
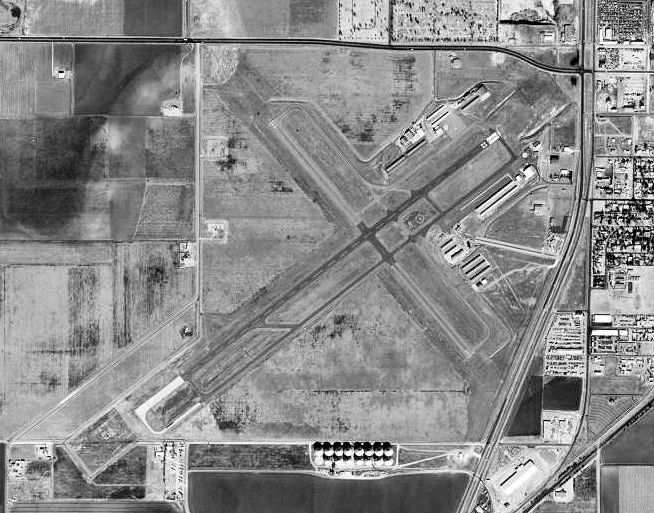
- 1996 USGS Photo
- IATA: PVW; ICAO: KPVW; FAA LID: PVW

Summary
- Airport type: Public
- Owner: City of Plainview and Hale County, Texas
- Location: Hale County, near Plainview, Texas
- Elevation AMSL: 3,374 ft / 1,028 m
- Coordinates: 34°10′08″N 101°42′57″W
- Interactive map of Hale County Airport

Runways
Direction	Length		Surface
Direction	ft	m	Surface
04/22	5,997	1,828	Asphalt
13/31	4,000	1,219	Asphalt

Hale County Airport (IATA: PVW, ICAO: KPVW, FAA LID: PVW) is a public airport about 1 mile (1.6 km) south-southwest of Plainview, Texas.

== History ==
From 1942 to 1944, the Hale County Airport consisted of an all-way turf airfield with a 2,700' x 2,700' landing/takeoff area. Glider training was provided to the United States Army Air Forces by Clint Breedlove Aerial Service. They primarily used C-47 Skytrains and Waco CG-4 unpowered gliders. There were possibly two auxiliary landing airfields. The mission of the school was to train glider pilot students in proficiency in operation of gliders in various types of towed and soaring flight, both day and night, and in servicing of gliders in the field.

The airport was inactivated during 1944 with the drawdown of AAFTC's pilot training program. It was declared surplus and turned over to the Army Corps of Engineers on 30 September 1945. It was eventually discharged to the War Assets Administration (WAA) and became a civil airport in April 1946.

Three commercial airlines served Plainview between 1948 and 1963. Pioneer Air Lines began service in January 1948 and ended on April 1, 1955, when the carrier merged into Continental Airlines. Continental then served the airport until 1959 when Central Airlines began service. During 1962, Central operated 516 flight departures but only boarded 148 passengers. Service ended in 1963. All three carriers operated Douglas DC-3 aircraft and provided flights to Amarillo and Lubbock. The Pioneer and Continental flights continued on from Lubbock to Midland/Odessa, San Angelo, Austin, and Houston Hobby Airport. Central Airlines flights continued northbound from Amarillo to Wichita and Kansas City with several stops en route.

== See also ==
- Texas World War II Army Airfields
- 31st Flying Training Wing (World War II)
- List of airports in Texas
