= Jones Field =

Airport in Fannin County, Texas

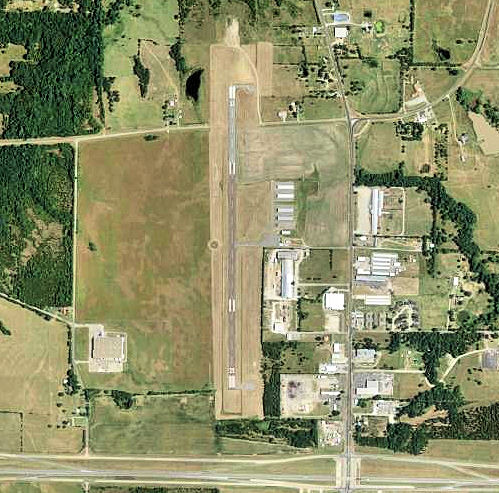
- USGS 2007 orthophoto
- IATA: none; ICAO: none; FAA LID: F00

Summary
- Airport type: Public
- Owner: City of Bonham
- Serves: Bonham, Texas
- Elevation AMSL: 618 ft (188 m)
- Coordinates: 33°36′47″N 96°10′46″W

Map
- Location of airport in Texas

Runways
Direction	Length		Surface
Direction	ft	m	Surface
17/35	4,000	1,219	Asphalt

Statistics (2022)
- Aircraft operations (year ending 9/16/2022): 13,600
- Based aircraft: 24
- Source: Federal Aviation Administration

Jones Field (FAA LID: F00) is a city-owned, public-use airport located two nautical miles (4 km) north of the central business district of Bonham, a city in Fannin County, Texas, United States. It is included in the National Plan of Integrated Airport Systems for 2011–2015, which categorized it as a general aviation airport.

== Facilities and aircraft ==
Jones Field covers an area of 300 acres (121 ha) at an elevation of 618 feet (188 m) above mean sea level. It has one runway designated 17/35 with an asphalt surface measuring 4,000 by 75 feet (1,219 x 23 m).

For the 12-month period ending September 16, 2022, the airport had 13,600 general aviation aircraft operations, an average of 37 per day. At that time there were 24 aircraft based at this airport: 23 single-engine, and 1 helicopter.

== History ==
Jones Field 1943 Classbook

Originally dedicated as the Bonham city airport on November 11, 1929 as George Jones Airport. The land was leased from the city of Bonham, and construction began in summer 1941. The school opened on October 4, 1941, and had three hangars and a 1200’ x 100’ asphalt ramp among its facilities. Activated by the United States Army Air Forces on October 4, 1941. Assigned to the USAAF Gulf Coast Training Center (later Central Flying Training Command) as a primary (level 1) pilot training airfield.

Base unit was 2547th Army Air Force Base Unit (Contract Pilot School, Primary). Pilot school operated by Bonham Aviation School under control of 302d Army Air Forces Flying Training Detachment. This was a civil contract flying school, providing elementary flying training for the Army Air Forces. At some point in time, probably in 1942, the property was purchased by the Defense Plant Corporation (who referred to it as PLANCOR 435) and leased back to Bonham Aviation School. This was a typical arrangement for contract flying schools serving the Army Air Forces.

Flying training was performed with Fairchild PT-19s as the primary trainer. Also had several PT-17 Stearmans and a few P-40 Warhawks assigned. The last student flew on 12 October 1944, and the school was inactivated on 16 October 1944 with the drawdown of AAFTC's pilot training program and was declared surplus and turned over to the Army Corps of Engineers. Eventually discharged to the War Assets Administration (WAA) returned to civil control.

== See also ==
- Texas World War II Army Airfields
- List of airports in Texas
- 31st Flying Training Wing (World War II)
