= C. David Campbell Field =

Airport in Navarro County, Texas, US

C. David Campbell Field Corsicana Municipal Airport
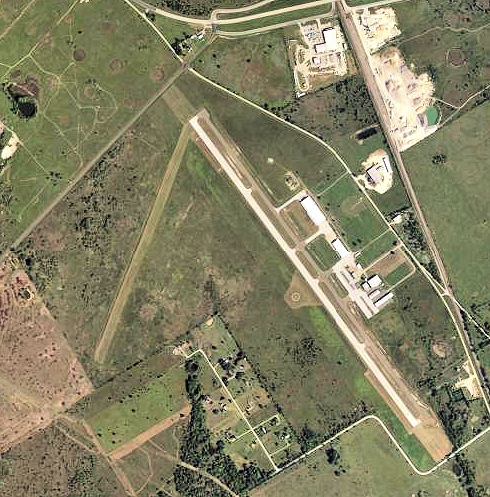
- USGS image 2006
- IATA: CRS; ICAO: KCRS; FAA LID: CRS

Summary
- Airport type: Public
- Owner: City of Corsicana
- Serves: Corsicana, Texas
- Elevation AMSL: 449 ft (137 m)
- Coordinates: 32°01′41″N 96°24′02″W

Map
- Location within Texas

Runways
Direction	Length		Surface
Direction	ft	m	Surface
14/32	5,004	1,525	Asphalt
2/20	3,200	975	Turf

Statistics (2022)
- Aircraft operations (year ending 9/30/2022): 25,200
- Based aircraft: 61
- Sources: FAA, City of Corsica

C. David Campbell Field (Corsicana Municipal Airport) (IATA: CRS, ICAO: KCRS, FAA LID: CRS) is six miles southeast of downtown Corsicana, in Navarro County, Texas It provides general aviation service.

== History ==
Corsicana Field 1942 Classbook

Opened on 1 April 1941 with 2,000 ft (610 m) all-way turf runway. Known as Corsicana Field. Assigned to United States Army Air Forces Gulf Coast Training Center (later Central Flying Training Command) as a primary (level 1) pilot training airfield. had six local axillary airfields for emergency and overflow landings.

Began training United States Army Air Corps flying cadets under contract to Air Activities of Texas under 301st Flying Training Detachment. Flying training was performed with Fairchild PT-19s as the primary trainer. Also had several PT-17 Stearmans and a few old A-3 Curtiss Falcons assigned.

Inactivated on 16 October 1944 with the drawdown of AAFTC's pilot training program. Declared surplus and turned over to the Army Corps of Engineers on 30 September 1945. Eventually discharged to the War Assets Administration (WAA) and became a civil airport.

== Facilities ==
The airport covers 166 acres (67 ha) at an elevation of 449 feet (137 m). It has two runways: 14/32 is 5,004 by 75 feet (1,525 x 23 m) asphalt; 2/20 is 3,200 by 75 feet (975 x 23 m) turf.

In the year ending September 30, 2022, the airport had 25,200 general aviation aircraft operations, average 69 per day. 61 aircraft were then based at the airport: 56 single-engine, 4 multi-engine, and 1 helicopter.

The Cumbie Aviation Museum is located in two rooms in the terminal.

== See also ==
- Texas World War II Army Airfields
- 31st Flying Training Wing (World War II)
- List of airports in Texas
