= Goodland Municipal Airport =

Airport in Sherman County, Kansas

Goodland Municipal Airport Renner Field
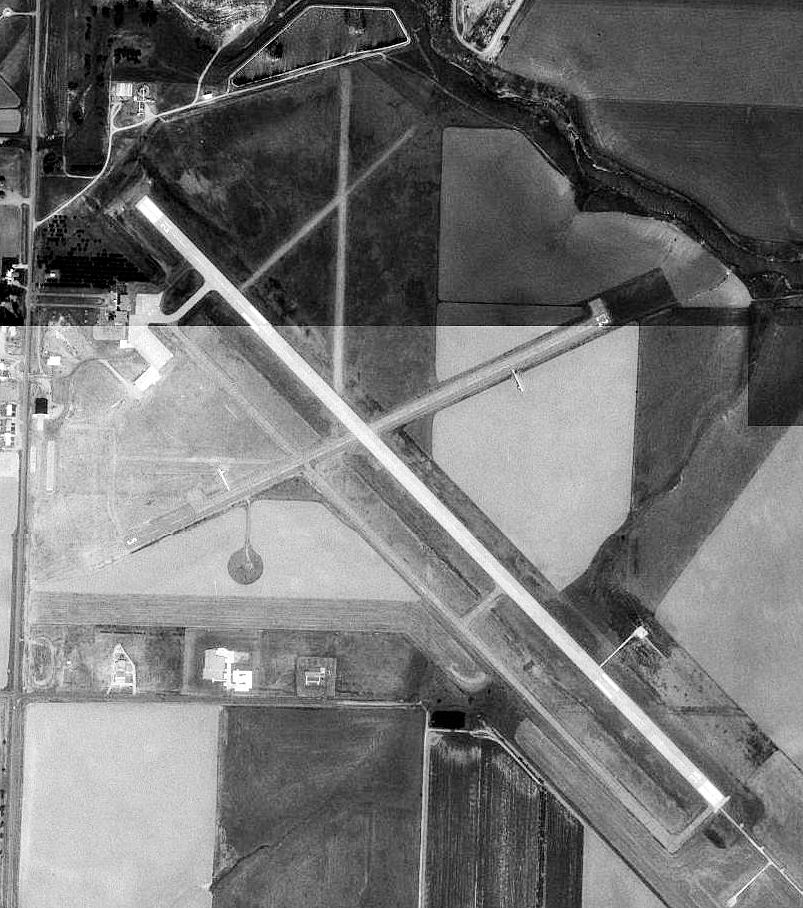
- USGS image, 28 August 1991
- IATA: GLD; ICAO: KGLD; FAA LID: GLD

Summary
- Airport type: Public
- Owner: City of Goodland
- Serves: Goodland, Kansas
- Elevation AMSL: 3,658 ft (1,115 m)
- Coordinates: 39°22′14″N 101°41′56″W
- Interactive map of Goodland Municipal Airport

Runways
Direction	Length		Surface
Direction	ft	m	Surface
12/30	5,499	1,676	Concrete
5/23	4,001	1,220	Asphalt
17/35	1,754	535	Turf

Statistics (2022)
- Aircraft operations (year ending 9/18/2022): 43,000
- Based aircraft: 21
- Source: Federal Aviation Administration

Goodland Municipal Airport (IATA: GLD, ICAO: KGLD, FAA LID: GLD) (Renner Field) is two miles north of Goodland, in Sherman County, Kansas, United States.

== Facilities ==
The airport covers 372 acres (151 ha) at an elevation of 3,658 feet (1,115 m). It has three runways: 12/30 is 5,499 by 100 feet (1,676 x 30 m) concrete; 5/23 is 4,001 by 75 feet (1,220 x 23 m) asphalt; 17/35 is 1,754 by 40 feet (549 x 12 m) turf.

In the year ending September 18, 2022, the airport had 43,000 aircraft operations, average 118 per day: 97% general aviation, 1% air taxi and 1% military. 21 aircraft were then based at the airport: 19 single-engine and 2 multi-engine.

== History ==
The airfield provided contract glider training to the United States Army Air Forces from 1942 to 1943. Training was provided by William A. Ong under AAFTC 22d Glider Training Detachment. The airfield used primarily C-47 Skytrains and Waco CG-4 unpowered gliders. Training began on 8 June 1942. The mission was to train glider pilot students in proficiency in operation of gliders in various types of towed and soaring flight, both day and night, and in servicing of gliders in the field.

During wartime the airport had four compacted soil runways: aligned N/S, NE/SW, E/W, and NW/SE, all about 2,800' long, with NE/SW 3,600' long. The former NW/SE runway is now paved and used as the main runway; the others are still visible in aerial photography. Training ended on 29 August 1943 due to shortage of equipment. The glider training mission was taken over by I Troop Carrier Command, and the airport was used as an auxiliary airfield until the end of the war. It was returned to civil control in September 1945.

=== Historical airline service ===
Goodland first received scheduled airline service in the early 1930s by United States Airways, which flew a Metal Aircraft Flamingo on an airmail route between Denver and Kansas City, stopping at Goodland, Salina, and Topeka, Kansas. This route was discontinued about 1933, and airline service did not return to Goodland until 1961 when Central Airlines began service to Denver, Kansas City, and Wichita on Douglas DC-3s. The flights to Kansas City and Wichita made stops in other Kansas cities. In 1967 Central merged with the original Frontier Airlines (1950–1986) which continued service to Goodland with Convair 580s. Frontier ended service in 1976–77; Air Midwest began flying Fairchild Swearingen Metroliners on the same routes. In early 1988 Air Midwest to Goodland began code-sharing with Eastern Airlines, operating as Eastern Express. By late 1988 the agreement with Eastern had ended and Air Midwest began a new code-share agreement with Braniff (1983–1990) operating as Braniff Express. This agreement ended the following year when Braniff shut down. Air Midwest then reverted to operating under their own brand until early 1991 when another code-share agreement was set up with US Airways to operate as US Airways Express, with flights to Kansas City and Denver. Air Midwest ended service on April 15, 1992, and Mesa Airlines began service operating as United Express for United Airlines. This service was to Denver on Beechcraft 1900Ds. Mesa's service ended in mid-1996 and the United Express service to Denver was reinstated in mid-1997 by Great Lakes Airlines, also with Beechcraft 1900Ds. Great Lakes flights ended in early 2000 and Goodland has not had airline service since.

== See also ==
- Kansas World War II Army Airfields
- List of airports in Kansas
- 31st Flying Training Wing (World War II)

== Other sources ==
- This article incorporates public domain material from the Air Force Historical Research Agency
- Manning, Thomas A. (2005), History of Air Education and Training Command, 1942–2002. Office of History and Research, Headquarters, AETC, Randolph AFB, Texas OCLC 71006954, 29991467
- Shaw, Frederick J. (2004), Locating Air Force Base Sites, History’s Legacy, Air Force History and Museums Program, United States Air Force, Washington DC. OCLC 57007862, 1050653629
