= Hays Field (airport) =

Former airport in Ellis County, Kansas

Coordinates: 38°52′49″N 99°17′47″W

Hays Field was an airport located about 1.5 miles (2.4 km) east of Hays, a city in Ellis County, Kansas, United States. It was closed shortly after World War II and is now redeveloped as part of the urban area of the city.

== History ==
Provided contract glider training to the United States Army Air Forces, 1942–1944. Training provided by Harte Flying Service. Used primarily C-47 Skytrains and Waco CG-4 unpowered Gliders. The mission of the school was to train glider pilot students in proficiency in operation of gliders in various types of towed and soaring flight, both day and night, and in servicing of gliders in the field. Had 4 turf runways, about 2,000' aligned N/S; NE/SW; E/W; NW/SE. Basically an all-way turf airfield. Closed after World War II; Hays Medical Center located on former airport site.

== See also ==
- Kansas World War II Army Airfields
- 31st Flying Training Wing (World War II)
