= Chickasha Municipal Airport =

Airport in Grady County, Oklahoma, US

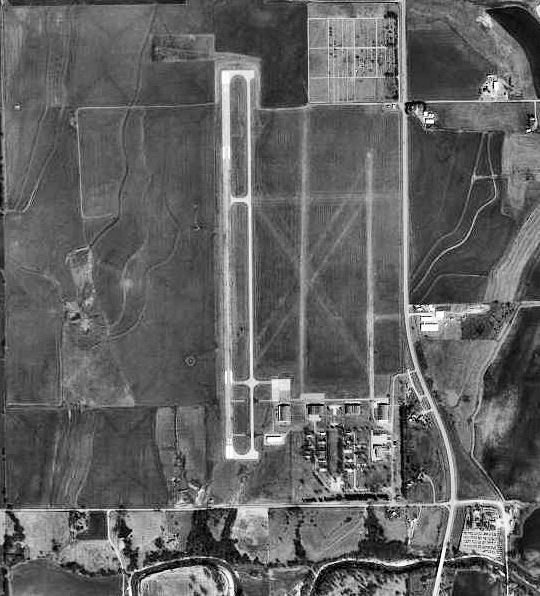
- 1995 USGS image
- IATA: CHK; ICAO: KCHK; FAA LID: CHK

Summary
- Airport type: Public
- Owner: City of Chickasha
- Serves: Chickasha, Oklahoma
- Location: Grady County, near Chickasha, Oklahoma
- Elevation AMSL: 1,152 ft (351 m)
- Coordinates: 35°05′50″N 97°58′04″W
- Website: Chickasha.org/airport/

Map
- Location within Oklahoma

Runways
Direction	Length		Surface
Direction	ft	m	Surface
17/35	5,101	1,555	Concrete
18/36	2,840	866	Turf
2/20	2,525	770	Turf

Statistics (2010)
- Aircraft operations: 4,000
- Based aircraft: 36
- Source: Federal Aviation Administration

Chickasha Municipal Airport (IATA: CHK, ICAO: KCHK, FAA LID: CHK) is four miles northwest of Chickasha, in Grady County, Oklahoma, United States. The National Plan of Integrated Airport Systems for 2011–2015 categorized it as a general aviation facility.

== Facilities ==
The airport covers 720 acres (291 ha) at an elevation of 1,152 feet (351 m). Its single paved runway, 17/35, is 5,101 by 100 feet (1,555 x 30 m) concrete. It has two turf runways: 18/36 is 2,840 by 145 feet (866 x 44 m) and 2/20 is 2,525 by 100 feet (770 x 30 m).

In the year ending November 8, 2010 the airport had 4,000 general aviation aircraft operations, average 10 per day. 36 aircraft were then based at this airport: 80% single-engine, 17% multi-engine, and 3% helicopter.

== History ==
Opened in October 1941 as Wilson-Bonfils Field, the airport conducted contract basic flying training for the United States Army Air Forces. The contractor was the Wilson-Bonfils Flying Schools. Flying training was performed with Fairchild PT-19s as the primary trainer. Also had several PT-17 Stearmans and a few P-40 Warhawks assigned. The wartime airport had up to six grass runways, with the runways being changed at times.

There may have been four auxiliaries associated with Chickasha - Aux #1, Aux #2, Aux #3 and Aux #4, but unconfirmed and location unknown.

Deactivated on 1 May 1945 with the drawdown of AAFTC's pilot training program. The airfield was turned over to civil control at the end of the war though the War Assets Administration (WAA).

Chickasha had scheduled airline flights on Central Airlines DC-3s for a year or two, ending in 1955.

On May 3, 1999, the airport was hit by an F-2 tornado during the 1999 Oklahoma tornado outbreak. No one at the airport was killed, but two hangars and several airplanes were damaged, and an airplane wing was found several miles away when the parent supercell dropped its ninth, and most catastrophic, tornado: an F5, which would pulverize Bridge Creek and the southern/eastern suburbs of Oklahoma City including Moore, Del City, Tinker Air Force Base and Midwest City

== See also ==
- Oklahoma World War II Army Airfields
- 31st Flying Training Wing (World War II)
