= Bruce Field =

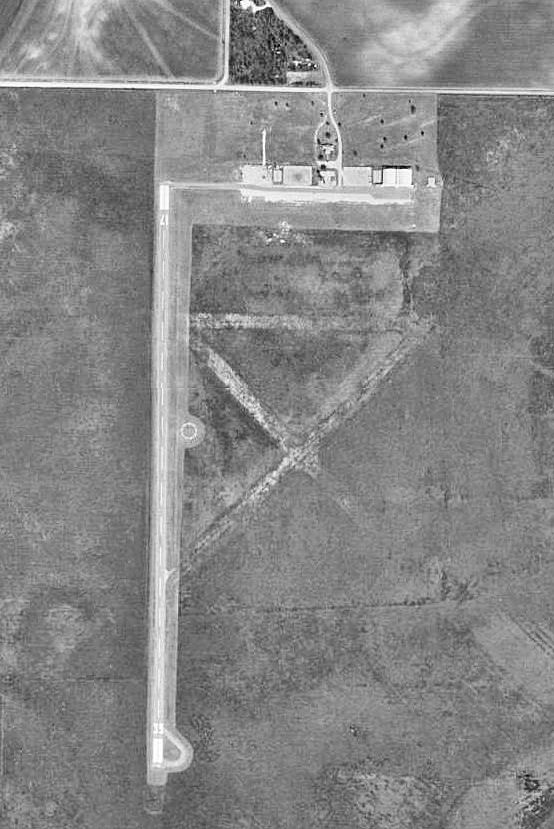
- USGS aerial image, January 1995
- IATA: none; ICAO: none; FAA LID: E30

Summary
- Airport type: Public
- Owner: City of Ballinger
- Serves: Ballinger, Texas
- Elevation AMSL: 1,739 ft (530 m)
- Coordinates: 31°40′28″N 099°58′37″W

Map
- Location of airport in Texas

Runways
Direction	Length		Surface
Direction	ft	m	Surface
17/35	3,909	1,191	Asphalt

Statistics (2009)
- Aircraft operations: 1,850
- Based aircraft: 6
- Source: Federal Aviation Administration

Bruce Field (FAA LID: E30) is a city-owned public-use general aviation airport located five nautical miles (6 mi, 9 km) southwest of the central business district of Ballinger, a city in Runnels County, Texas, United States.

== Facilities and aircraft ==
Bruce Field covers an area of 640 acres (259 ha) at an elevation of 1,739 feet (530 m) above mean sea level. It has one runway designated 17/35 with an asphalt surface measuring 3,909 by 60 feet (1,191 x 18 m).

For the 12-month period ending March 4, 2009, the airport had 1,850 aircraft operations, an average of 154 per month: 97% general aviation and 3% air taxi. At that time there were 6 aircraft based at this airport: 83% single-engine, and 17% multi-engine.

== History ==
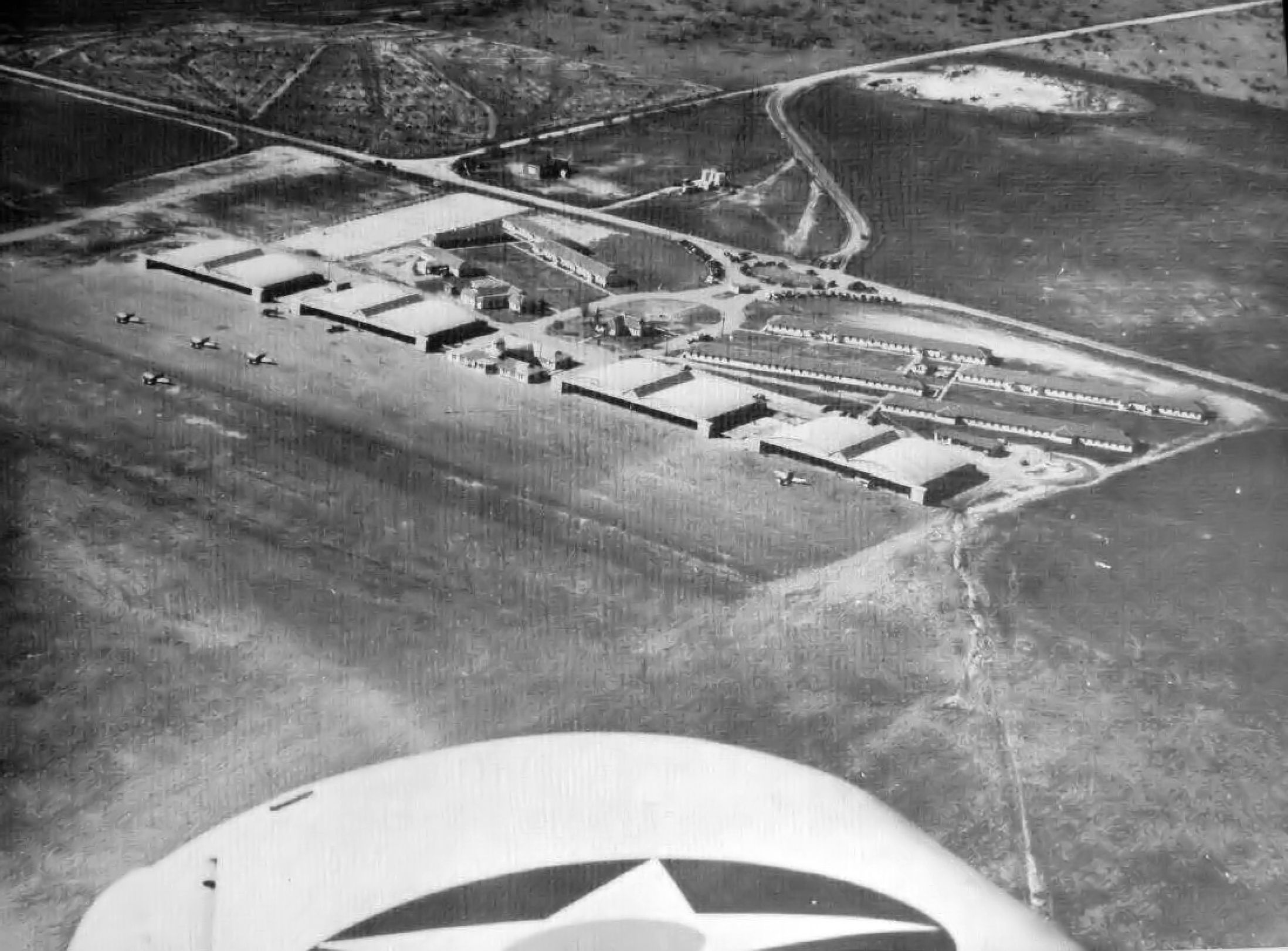
Bruce Field – Airfield photographed from at PT-19 in flight

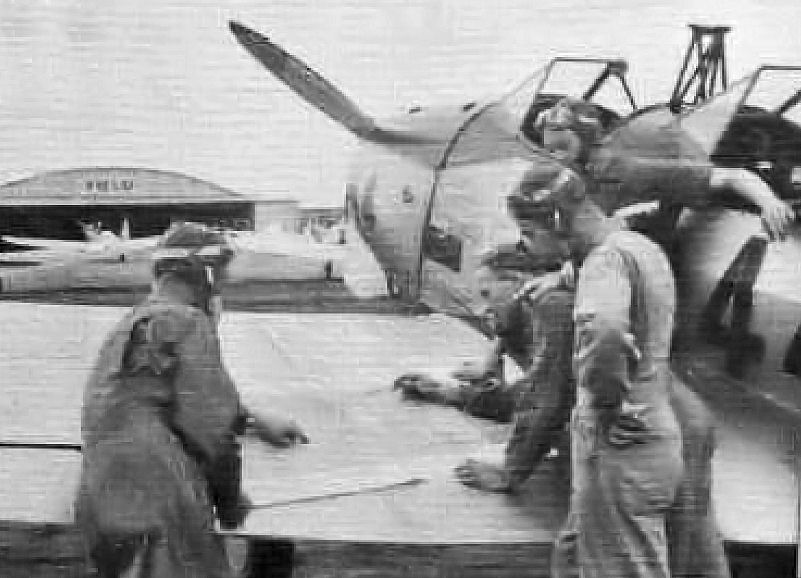
Aviation Cadets with Instructor Pilot

In preparation for the eventual U.S. entry into World War II, the United States Army Air Corps sought to expand the nation's combat air forces by asking civilian flight schools to provide the primary phase of training for air cadets. Consequently, it contracted with nine civilian flying schools to provide primary flying training, with the graduates being moved on to basic and advanced training at regular military training airfields.

The City of Ballenger responded. Mr. R.E. Bruce, chairman of the Ballinger aviation committee, located six hundred forty acres for an airfield which was purchased and on July 23, 1941, groundbreaking exercises were held. Construction began immediately, although part of the work was held up while the cotton growing on the site was harvested. The Harman Flying Service, headed by Mr. Fred Harman, was the first training contractor.

Opened on October 4, 1941, it began training United States Army Air Corps flying cadets under contract to Harmon Flying School. The airfield had three 2,100' active hard-surfaced runways and five local axillary airfields for emergency and overflow landings.

It was assigned to the United States Army Air Forces Gulf Coast Training Center (later Central Flying Training Command), as a primary (level 1) pilot training airfield. It was assigned to United States Army Air Forces Gulf Coast Training Center (later Central Flying Training Command) 31st Flying Training Wing as a primary (level 1) pilot training airfield. Various facilities to serve as barracks, recreation dayrooms, dining facilities, classrooms, exercise fields and other buildings would be constructed and used for military training and indoctrination, commanded by an Air Corps officer and staff.

Bruce Field, 1942 classbook

Air Cadets were trained on PT-17 Stearman and Fairchild PT-19 aircraft. The training provided by civilian flying schools included 65 hours of flying instruction in addition to the standard ground school curriculum provided by the Air Corps.

Bruce Field was inactivated on 16 October 1944 with the drawdown of AAFTC's pilot training program. With its closure, the facility was declared surplus and turned over to the Army Corps of Engineers on 30 September 1945. It was turned over to the War Assets Administration (WAA), and in 1947 was transferred to the city of Ballenger for use as a civil airport.

Today there is very little left of the military past at Bruce Field. The civil general aviation airport constructed a new 4,000' asphalt runway with three new hangars just to the west of the former military training field.

Nearly all of the parking apron and all three former runways have been removed, with ghostly outlines visible in aerial photography. The post operations building and three of the four double military hangars have been removed, along with all of the former station area. Some broken concrete foundations remain of the hangars and operations building. The airport can be seen from the south side of CR 240, part of the main gate still stands, along with the station flagpole.

== See also ==
- List of airports in Texas
- Texas World War II Army Airfields
- 31st Flying Training Wing (World War II)
