= Fort Stockton–Pecos County Airport =

Fort Stockton–Pecos County Airport Gibbs Army Airfield
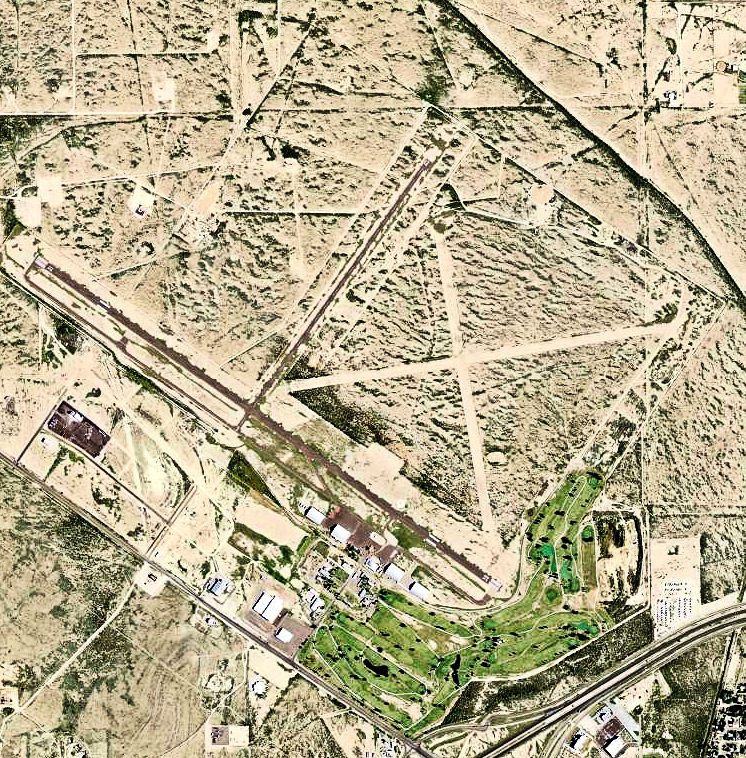
- 2006 USGS Airphoto
- IATA: FST; ICAO: KFST

Summary
- Airport type: Public
- Location: Pecos County, near Fort Stockton, Texas
- Elevation AMSL: 3,011 ft / 917.8 m
- Coordinates: 30°54′55″N 102°54′46″W

Map
- Location

Runways
Direction	Length		Surface
Direction	ft	m	Surface
12/30	7,508	2,288	Asphalt
3/21	4,399	1,341	Asphalt
7/25	4,961	1,512	Turf
16/34	3,981	1,213	Turf
11/29	3,348	1,020	Turf

Fort Stockton–Pecos County Airport (IATA: FST, ICAO: KFST) is two miles NW of Fort Stockton, Texas; it is owned and operated by Pecos County, Texas.

== History ==
The airport opened as Gibbs Field , or Fort Stockton Field and was used by the United States Army Air Forces as a training base during World War II.

Opened on 1 June 1942 with two 2,500' turf runways. Began training United States Army Air Corps flying cadets under contract to Pacific Air School Ltd. Assigned to United States Army Air Forces Gulf Coast Training Center (later Central Flying Training Command) as a primary (level 1) pilot training airfield. had two local auxiliary airfields for emergency and overflow landings. Flying training was performed with Fairchild PT-19s as the primary trainer. Also had several PT-17 Stearmans and a few P-40 Warhawks assigned.

Inactivated on 12 March 1944 with the drawdown of AAFTC's pilot training program. Declared surplus and turned over to the Army Corps of Engineers on 30 September 1945. Eventually discharged to the War Assets Administration (WAA) and became a civil airport.

Airline flights (Trans-Texas DC-3s) ended in 1960.

== See also ==
- Texas World War II Army Airfields
- 31st Flying Training Wing (World War II)
- List of airports in Texas
