= Okmulgee Regional Airport =

Airport in Okmulgee County, Oklahoma

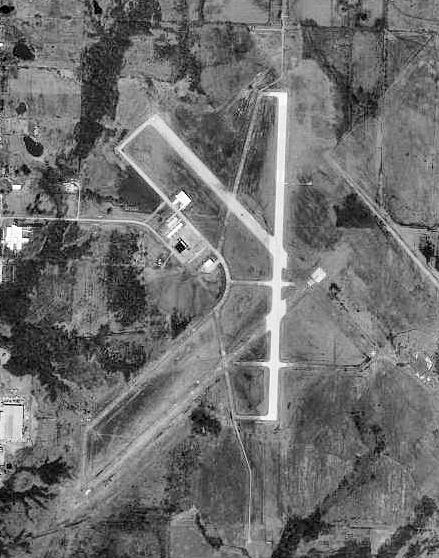
- 1995 USGS orthophoto
- IATA: OKM; ICAO: KOKM; FAA LID: OKM

Summary
- Airport type: Public
- Owner: City of Okmulgee
- Serves: Okmulgee, Oklahoma
- Elevation AMSL: 720 ft / 219 m
- Coordinates: 35°40′05″N 95°56′55″W
- Website: OkmulgeeAirport.org

Map

Runways
Direction	Length		Surface
Direction	ft	m	Surface
18/36	5,150	1,570	Concrete

Statistics (2009)
- Aircraft operations: 12,410
- Based aircraft: 16
- Source: Federal Aviation Administration

Okmulgee Regional Airport (IATA: OKM, ICAO: KOKM, FAA LID: OKM) is in Okmulgee County, Oklahoma, three miles north of the city of Okmulgee, which owns it. The National Plan of Integrated Airport Systems for 2021-2025 categorized it as a general aviation airport.

== History ==
Opened as Okmulgee Field in 1942 as a United States Army Air Forces airfield with three 6,000-ft hard surface runways, (00/18; 04/27; 15/33). began training United States Army Air Corps cadets under contract to Sooner Air Training Corp. Assigned to Gulf Coast Training Center (later Central Flying Training Command) as a primary (level 1) pilot training airfield. Hangar Six, Inc. conducted pilot training. Airfield had four local auxiliary airfields for emergency and overflow landings. Flying training used Fairchild PT-19s as the primary trainer. Also had several PT-17 Stearmans. Also provided contract glider training using C-47 Skytrains and Waco CG-4 unpowered Gliders.

The field was closed on June 30, 1944, with the drawdown of AAFTC's pilot training program. It was declared surplus and turned over to the Army Corps of Engineers on September 30, 1945, and was eventually transferred to the War Assets Administration and became a civil airport.

Central Airlines scheduled flights to Okmulgee in 1950–53; in June 1950 it was a stop between Tulsa and Holdenville, Oklahoma.

== Facilities ==
The airport covers 1,100 acres (445 ha) at an elevation of 720 feet (219 m). Its one remaining runway, 18/36, is 5,150 by 100 feet (1,570 x 30 m) concrete.

The airport averaged 34 operations per day for the 12-month period ending July 29, 2019, with 95% transient general aviation and 5% local general aviation. 19 aircraft were then based at the airport: 18 single-engine and 1 multi-engine.

In May 2015, the Tulsa Airports Improvement Trust (TAIT) and the Okmulgee City Council approved a contract to bring operation and management of the Okmulgee Regional Airport under TAIT's umbrella effective July 1, 2015, while the city would continue to pay airport-related expenses. The contract was intended to bring new clients and businesses to the airport while relieving pressure on the 750-acre TAIT-operated Jones-Riverside Airport, 20 minutes north, which has already expanded to capacity. The contract has since been extended.

In 2016, TAIT drafted an Airport Capital Improvement Plan, also known as a Five-Year Plan, for Okmulgee Regional Airport, which was approved by the Okmulgee City Council on November 15, 2016. The document shows improvements and funding sources for fiscal years 2018 through 2022.

== See also ==
- Oklahoma World War II Army Airfields
- 31st Flying Training Wing (World War II)
