= Sikeston Memorial Municipal Airport =

Airport in Scott County, Missouri

Sikeston Memorial Municipal Airport Harvey Parks Army Airfield
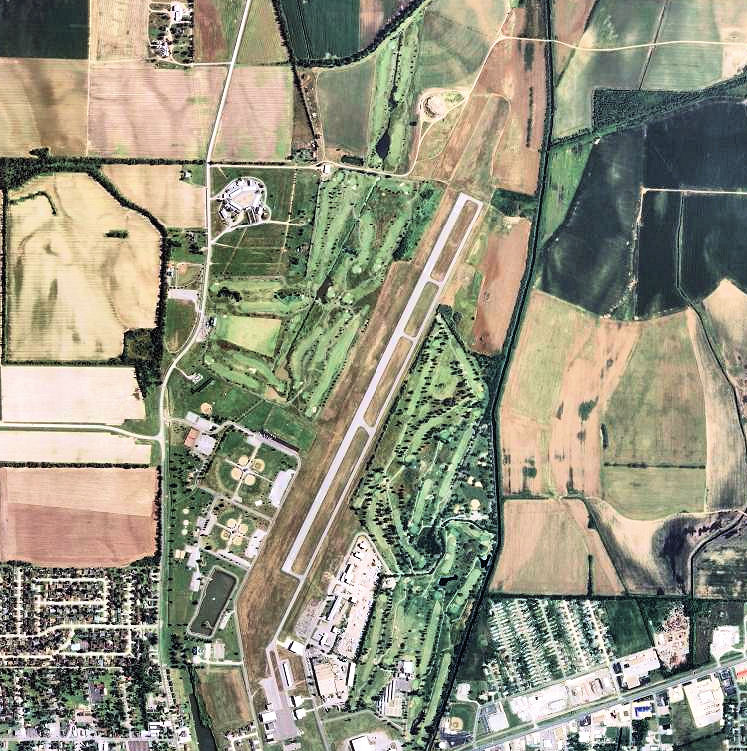
- USGS 2006 orthophoto
- IATA: SIK; ICAO: KSIK; FAA LID: SIK

Summary
- Airport type: Public
- Owner: City of Sikeston
- Serves: Sikeston, Missouri
- Elevation AMSL: 315 ft / 96 m
- Coordinates: 36°53′56″N 89°33′42″W

Map
- Location of airport in Missouri

Runways
Direction	Length		Surface
Direction	ft	m	Surface
2/20	5,502	1,677	Asphalt

Statistics (2009)
- Aircraft operations: 6,300
- Based aircraft: 20
- Source: Federal Aviation Administration

Sikeston Memorial Municipal Airport (IATA: SIK, ICAO: KSIK, FAA LID: SIK) is a city-owned, public-use airport located two nautical miles (4 km) northeast of the central business district of Sikeston, in Scott County, Missouri, United States. It is included in the National Plan of Integrated Airport Systems for 2011–2015, which categorized it as a general aviation airport. As of 7/2020, the runway is 3/21 due to magnetic field shift.

== History ==
Opened in April 1940 as Harvey Parks Airport with 6,600 by 5,280 feet (2,010 m × 1,610 m) open turf field. Began training United States Army Air Corps flying cadets in June 1940 under contract to Missouri Institute of Aeronautics. Assigned to United States Army Air Forces Gulf Coast Training Center (later Central FLying Training Command) as a primary (level 1) pilot training airfield. Flying training was performed with Fairchild PT-19s as the primary trainer. Also had several PT-17 Stearmans and a few P-40 Warhawks assigned. Also provided flexible gunnery training.

Fighter pilot Robert S. Johnson trained here on Stearmans.

Inactivated on October 16, 1944 with the drawdown of AAFTC's pilot training program. Declared surplus and turned over to the Army Corps of Engineers on 30 September 1945. Eventually discharged to the War Assets Administration (WAA) and returned to being a civil airport.

Since becoming a civil airport, it has become a very popular destination for Army helicopter crews from the 101st Airborne Division at Fort Campbell, Kentucky.

== Facilities and aircraft ==
Sikeston Memorial Municipal Airport covers an area of 732 acres (296 ha) at an elevation of 315 feet (96 m) above mean sea level. It has one runway designated 2/20 with an asphalt surface measuring 5,502 by 100 feet (1,677 x 30 m).

For the 12-month period ending November 30, 2009, the airport had 6,300 aircraft operations, an average of 17 per day: 79% general aviation, 14% military, and 6% air taxi. At that time there were 20 aircraft based at this airport: 75% single-engine, 10% multi-engine, and 15% ultralight.

== See also ==
- Missouri World War II Army Airfields
- 31st Flying Training Wing (World War II)
