= Victory Field (Texas) =

- Part of Army Air Forces Training Command
- Wilbarger County, near Vernon, Texas
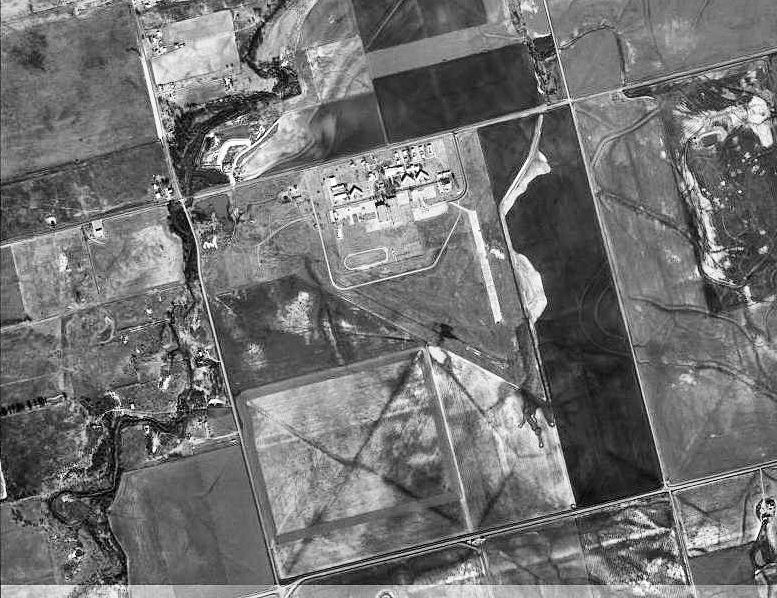
- 1994 USGS photo

Site information
- Type: Military airfield

Location
- Coordinates: 34°04′40″N 099°17′36″W

Site history
- Built: 1941
- In use: 1942-1945

Victory Field is a former military airfield, located approximately 6 miles (9.7 km) south-southwest of Vernon, Texas. It was closed in 1945 at the end of World War II.

== History ==
Part of the Army Air Corps build up for World War II, Victory Field was built and activated in June 1941. It was assigned to the Air Corps Flying Training Command, Gulf Coast Training Center (later Central Flying Training Command).

The facility was a primary (stage 1) pilot training airfield operated under contract by Hunter Flying Service & Richey Flying Service. Fairchild PT-19s were the primary trainer at the airfield. Thousands of cadets were trained and made their first solo flight at Victory Field. As the Army Air Corps succeeded in Europe it decided to draw down training and scheduled the closure of Victory Field in 1945.

== Current use ==
In 1950, it was a TYC unit, closing in 2010. It remains today the Adolescent Forensic Program for North Texas State Hospital.

== See also ==
- Texas World War II Army Airfields
- 31st Flying Training Wing (World War II)
