= Theldor Airfield =

Former WWII airfield in Craig County, Oklahoma

Coordinates: 36°41′42″N 95°08′20″W

Theldor Airfield was a temporary World War II airfield located approximately 4 miles (6.4 km) north-northeast of Vinita, Oklahoma. It was closed after World War II.

== History ==
Theldor airfield provided contract glider training to the United States Army Air Forces from 1942 to 1944. Training was provided by Burke Aviation Service using an all-way turf airfield and, primarily, C-47 Skytrains and Waco CG-4 unpowered Gliders. The mission of the school was to train glider pilot students to proficiency in operation of gliders in various types of towed and soaring flight, both day and night, as well as in servicing of gliders in the field.

It was inactivated during 1944 with the drawdown of AAFTC's pilot training program. No evidence remains of its existence.

== See also ==
- Oklahoma World War II Army Airfields
- 31st Flying Training Wing (World War II)
