= Miami Municipal Airport =

Airport in Oklahoma, United States

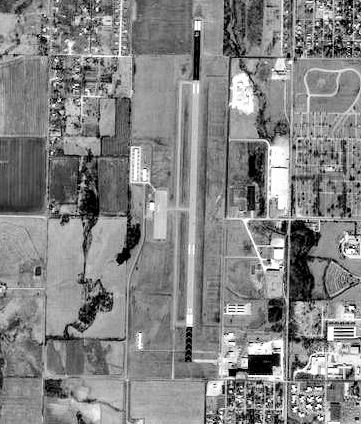
- USGS 1995 orthophoto
- IATA: MIO; ICAO: KMIO; FAA LID: MIO

Summary
- Airport type: Public
- Owner: City of Miami
- Serves: Miami, Oklahoma
- Elevation AMSL: 808 ft (246 m)
- Coordinates: 36°54′33″N 094°53′15″W

Map
- Location within Oklahoma

Runways
Direction	Length		Surface
Direction	ft	m	Surface
17/35	5,020	1,530	Asphalt

Statistics (2008)
- Aircraft operations: 12,000
- Based aircraft: 31
- Source: Federal Aviation Administration

Miami Municipal Airport (IATA: MIO, ICAO: KMIO, FAA LID: MIO) is two miles northwest of Miami, in Ottawa County, Oklahoma. The National Plan of Integrated Airport Systems for 2011–2015 called it a general aviation facility.

== History ==
The airport opened in December 1937 with two 3,200' concrete runways aligned north-south (17/35) and northeast-southwest (05/22).

In summer 1941 the facility was taken over by the United States Army Air Forces and was used initially as part of the British Flying Training School program. This training was part of the Lend-Lease act where Royal Air Force (RAF) flying cadets had a 20-week basic flying course taught by civil contractors. Flight training was by Spartan Aircraft Company, using Fairchild PT-19s as the primary trainer. Also had several PT-17 Stearmans and a few P-40 Warhawks assigned.

In November 1942 RAF training ended at Miami and the airfield became a primary (stage 1) pilot training airfield assigned to AAF Flying Training Command, Gulf Coast Training Center (later Central Flying Training Command). The civil instructors were retained under USAAF control.

Three known auxiliary airfields were associated with Miami Airport for emergency and overflow landings, all in the Miami area. Training ended in mid-1944 with the drawdown of AAFTC's pilot training program and the airfield returned to civil control.

Miami had scheduled airline flights for a year or two starting in 1952, on Ozark DC-3s.

== Facilities ==
Miami Municipal Airport covers 300 acres (121 ha) at an elevation of 808 feet (246 m). Its single runway, 17/35, is 5,020 by 100 feet (1,530 x 30 m) asphalt.

In the year ending July 10, 2008 the airport had 12,000 general aviation aircraft operations, average 32 per day. 31 aircraft were then based at the airport: 74% single-engine and 26% multi-engine.

== Incidents ==
On November 8, 2010 a Cessna 150 crash landed at the airport. No one was injured as it landed in a plowed field and sustained minor damage.

== See also ==
- Oklahoma World War II Army Airfields
- List of airports in Oklahoma
- 31st Flying Training Wing (World War II)
