= Cuero Municipal Airport =

Airport in DeWitt County, Texas

Cuero Municipal Airport Cuero Army Airfield
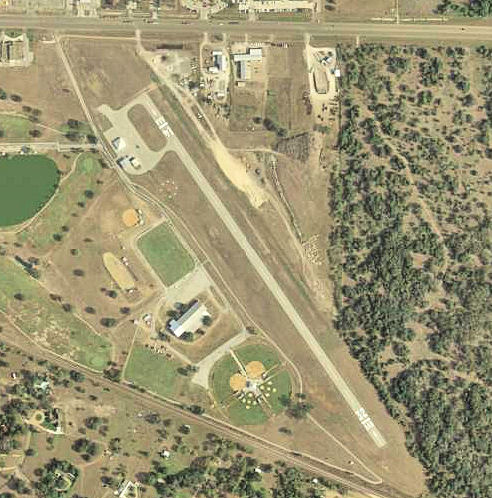
- 2006 USGS Photo
- IATA: none; ICAO: none; FAA LID: T71

Summary
- Airport type: Public
- Owner: City of Cuero
- Location: Cuero, Texas
- Elevation AMSL: 214 ft / 65 m
- Coordinates: 29°04′57″N 97°15′58″W

Map
- Location of Cuero Municipal Airport

Runways
Direction	Length		Surface
Direction	ft	m	Surface
14/32	2,800	853	Asphalt

Cuero Field 1944 USAAF Classbook

Cuero Municipal Airport (FAA LID: T71) is a public airport located approximately 1 mile (1.6 km) east-southeast of Cuero, Texas. It provides general aviation service.

== History ==
After being leased, it opened on 1 April 1941 with 5000 ft all-way turf runway (same location as present day Dewitt County Prison, hangars still used). Began training United States Army Air Corps flying cadets under contract to Brayton Flying Service, Inc. Assigned to United States Army Air Forces Gulf Coast Training Center (later Central Flying Training Command) as a primary (level 1) pilot training airfield. had four local axillary airfields for emergency and overflow landings. Flight training was performed with Fairchild PT-19s as the primary trainer. Also had several PT-17 Stearmans and a few old Curtiss P-1 Hawks and Airco DH.4s assigned.

Deactivated on 4 August 1944 with the drawdown of AAFTC's pilot training program. Declared surplus and turned over to the Army Corps of Engineers on 30 September 1945. Eventually discharged to the War Assets Administration (WAA) and became a civil airport.

=== Present ===
As of February 2015, there are 2 hangars and 4 tie downs for general aviation aircraft.

== See also ==
- Texas World War II Army Airfields
- 31st Flying Training Wing (World War II)
- List of airports in Texas

== Sources ==
- Manning, Thomas A. (2005), History of Air Education and Training Command, 1942–2002. Office of History and Research, Headquarters, AETC, Randolph AFB, Texas OCLC 71006954, 29991467
- Shaw, Frederick J. (2004), Locating Air Force Base Sites, History’s Legacy, Air Force History and Museums Program, United States Air Force, Washington DC. OCLC 57007862, 1050653629
