= Lamesa Army Airfield =

Abandoned military airfield

- Part of Army Air Forces Training Command
- Located near Lamesa, Texas
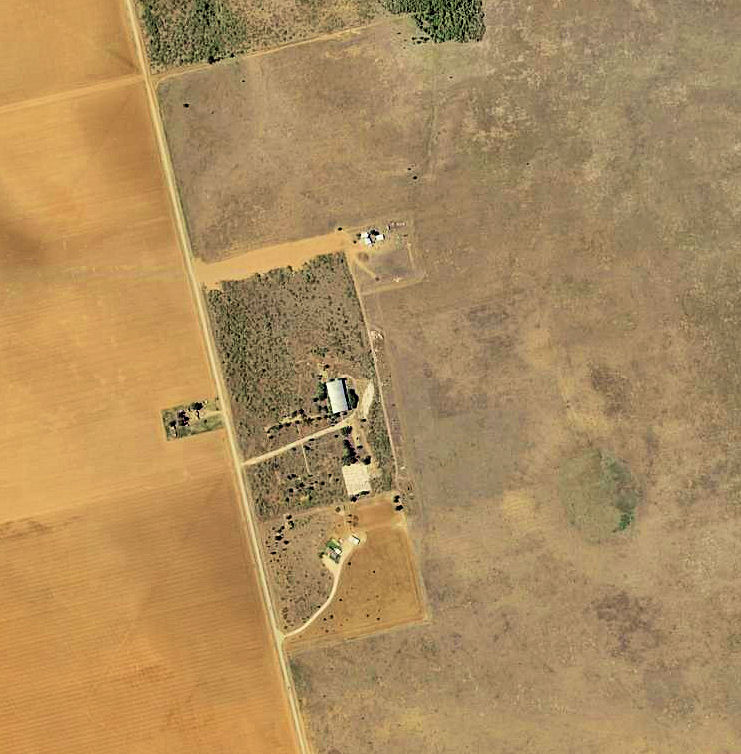
- 2006 USGS photo

Site information
- Type: Military airfield

Location
- Coordinates: 32°50′41″N 101°55′12″W

Site history
- Built: 1942
- In use: 1942-1947

Lamesa Field is an abandoned military airfield located about 8 miles (13 km) north-northeast of Lamesa, Texas.

== History ==
The airfield was opened in on 1 June 1942 and was used by the United States Army Air Forces as a contract flying school. It was assigned to the Air Corps Flying Training Command, Gulf Coast Training Center (later Central Flying Training Command). The facility was a primary (stage 1) pilot training airfield operated under contract by the John Wilson Glider School provided elementary and advanced glider training to Army aviation cadets of the 28th Army Air Forces Glider Training Detachment until its deactivation on 18 February 1943.

In April of that year, the 3rd Army Air Forces Liaison Training Detachment was moved from Plainview to Lamesa, with liaison pilot training provided by Clent Breedlove Aerial Services. Liaison pilot training ended at Lamesa in January 1944. From 1 September 1944 to 18 November 1946, the airfield was operated by the War Assets Commission to sell surplus military supplies to the local civilian community. From 17 February 1947 to 11 September 1947, the airfield served as Lamesa Municipal Airport, until replaced by the current Lamesa Municipal Airport (8 miles south). Originally, two hangars, three barracks capable of housing 160 students, a medical clinic, mess hall, recreation room, and administrative building, which also served as a control tower for flight operations were on the airfield; one hangar survives, but the entire airfield has been removed and returned to agriculture.

== See also ==
- Texas World War II Army Airfields
- 36th Flying Training Wing (World War II)
