= Big Spring Army Glider Training School =

World War II US military unit

Coordinates: 32°30′00″N 101°31′00″W

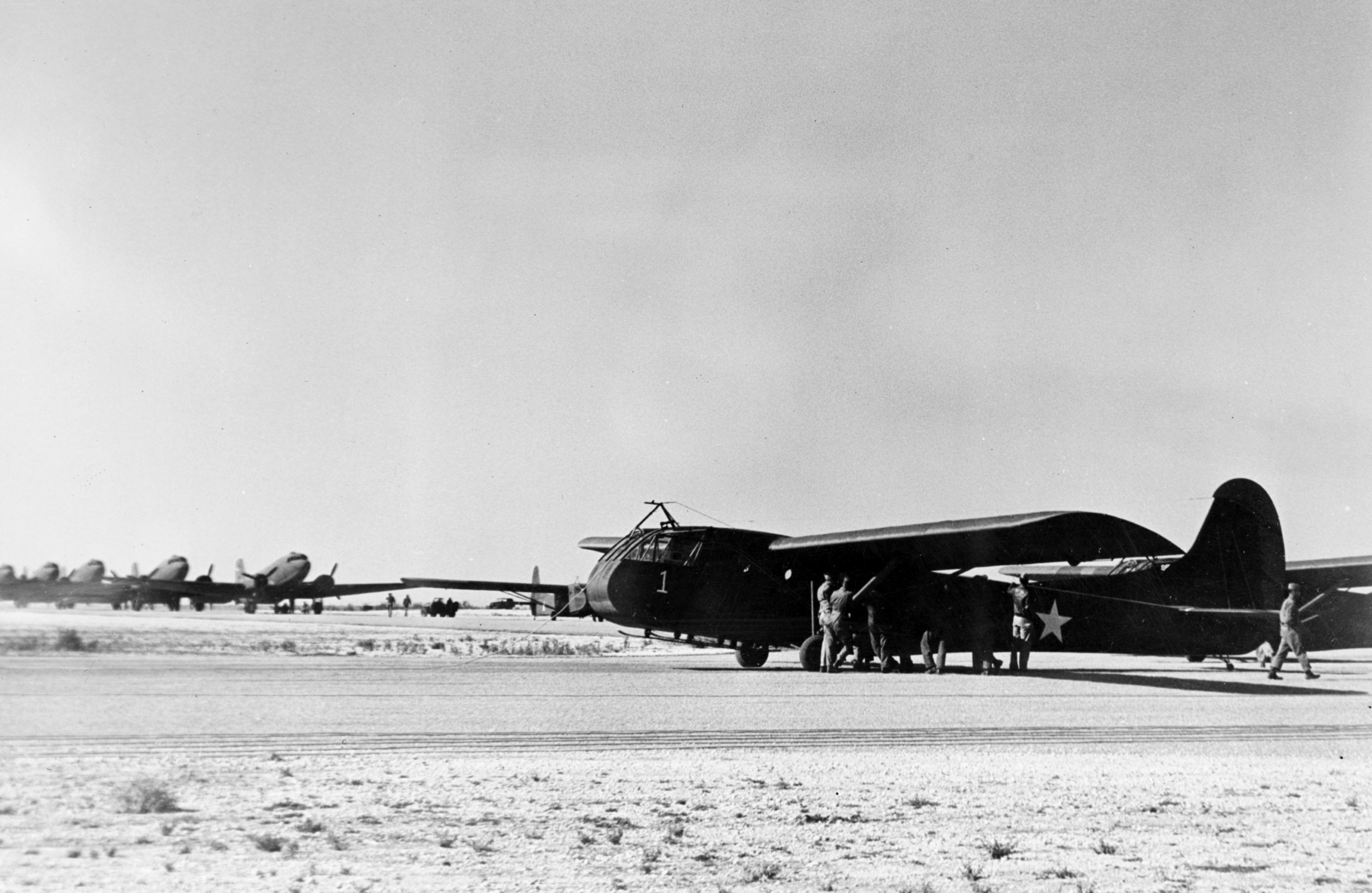
- C-47 tugs and CG-4 gliders at a Southwestern United States Training aircfield, possibly at the Big Spring Army Glider Training School
- Active: 10 July 1942 - 15 January 1943
- Country: (United States)
- Branch: US Army
- Role: Glider training school
- Garrison/HQ: Big Spring, Texas

Big Spring Army Glider Training School is an abandoned facility located approximately 18 miles (29 km) north-northwest of Big Spring, Texas. It is now farmland and no trace of it exists.

== History ==
The facility consisted of a 7,000' dirt runway located in a sparsely populated area. It was activated on 10 July 1942 and was operated under contract to the United States Army Air Forces by Big Spring Flying Service.

Used primarily C-47 Skytrains and Waco CG-4 unpowered gliders. The mission of the school was to train glider pilot students in proficiency in operation of gliders in various types of towed and soaring flight, both day and night, and in servicing of gliders in the field.

Training ceased with students transferred to Big Spring Army Airfield due to inadequacy of water supply and barracks heating on 15 January 1943.

== See also ==
- Texas World War II Army Airfields
- 36th Flying Training Wing (World War II)
