= Terrell Municipal Airport =

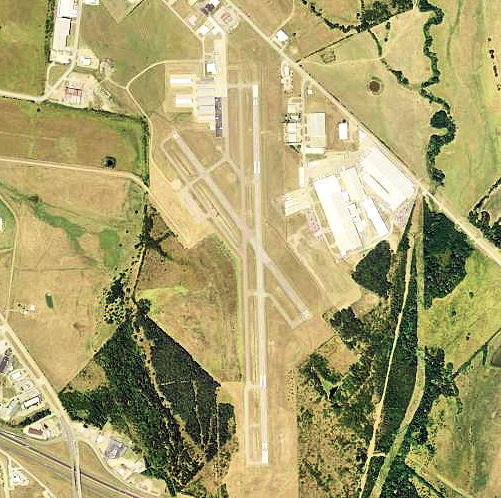
- 2006 USGS photo
- IATA: TRL; ICAO: KTRL

Summary
- Airport type: City of Terrell, Texas
- Operator: 474
- Location: Terrell, Texas
- Elevation AMSL: 474 ft / 144.5 m
- Coordinates: 32°42′33.04″N 096°16′2.61″W

Map
- Location of Terrell Municipal Airport

Runways
Direction	Length		Surface
Direction	ft	m	Surface
17/35	5,006	1,526	Asphalt

Terrell Municipal Airport (IATA: TRL, ICAO: KTRL) is a public access airport located within the city limits of Terrell, Texas, 1 mile SE of central Terrell.

The airport has services for commercial and private aviation. Aircraft operations, including local general aviation, transient general aviation, and air taxi, average 70 per day. The Airport Industrial Park is adjacent to the field.

It is owned and operated by the city of Terrell.

== History ==
The airport, actually only a grass field, was first used by a local flying club beginning in the fall of 1940. In June 1941, the field was leased to Major William Long of Dallas, a civilian flight school operator, to be the home of the new No. 1 British Flying Training School, the first of seven British contract flight schools in the United States. This training was part of Lend-Lease aid where Royal Air Force flying cadets were provided a 20-week flying course of 150 flight hours, taught by civilian instructors under the supervision of a Royal Air Force and civilian staff. Toward the end of the war the course had grown to a 32-week course of 220 hours. The new school, known as the Terrell Aviation School, offered flight training from primary through advanced instruction at the field. The school initially used the Stearman PT-18 primary trainer, the Vultee BT-13 basic trainer, and the AT-6 advanced trainer. After November 1943, the BT-13 was removed and students transitioned from the Stearman directly to the AT-6.

From November 1942 until June 1944, small numbers of American Army Air Forces flight cadets trained alongside the RAF students. During 1943, the school was expanded from 200 students to 300 students and two 3,000' asphalt hard surface runways were constructed by the Defense Plant Corporation (an agency of the US Government which had assumed ownership of the physical assets of all civilian flight schools in the United States). Runway 17/35 was extended to 5000' after the war.

One of the RAF pilots trained at Terrell was actor Robert Hardy. Another of the RAF trainees was Arthur Louis Aaron, who later won the Victoria Cross.

Royal Air Force pilot training at the airfield ended in early September 1945 and with the end of World War II the airfield was determined to be excess by the military and turned over to the local government for civil use.

== See also ==
- Texas World War II Army Airfields
- 31st Flying Training Wing (World War II)
- List of airports in Texas
