= Atkinson Municipal Airport =

Airport in Crawford County, Kansas

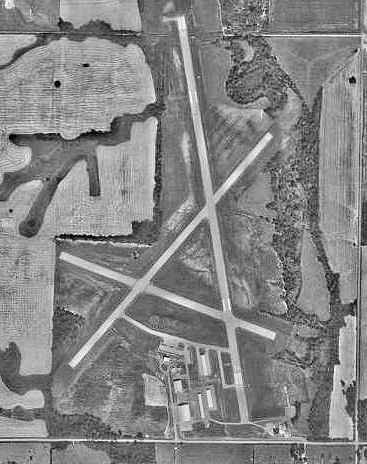
- USGS 1991 orthophoto
- IATA: PTS; ICAO: KPTS; FAA LID: PTS

Summary
- Airport type: Public
- Owner: City of Pittsburg
- Serves: Pittsburg, Kansas
- Elevation AMSL: 946 ft (288 m)
- Coordinates: 37°26′58″N 94°43′52″W

Map
- Location within Kansas

Runways
Direction	Length		Surface
Direction	ft	m	Surface
4/22	4,000	1,219	Asphalt
17/35	6,100	1,859	Asphalt

Statistics (2019)
- Aircraft operations (year ending 8/20/2019): 23,700
- Based aircraft: 29
- Source: Federal Aviation Administration

Atkinson Municipal Airport (IATA: PTS, ICAO: KPTS, FAA LID: PTS) is three miles northwest of Pittsburg, in Crawford County, Kansas, United States. The National Plan of Integrated Airport Systems for 2011–2015 categorized it as a general aviation facility.

== History ==
It was established as Pittsburg Airport in April 1940. It was taken over by the United States Army Air Force on May 25, 1942, as a basic (level 1) pilot training airfield. It was assigned to USAAF Gulf Coast Training Center (later Central Flying Training Command). The airport conducted contract basic flying training by McFarland Flying Service. Fairchild PT-19s were the primary trainers used. It also had several PT-17 Stearmans and a few P-40 Warhawks assigned. The flight school also operated two auxiliary airfields in the local area. Unpowered glider pilot training was performed by 21st Army Air Forces Glider Training Detachment from May 1942 until February 1943

The airport was inactivated on October 20, 1944, with the drawdown of AAFTC's pilot training program, and it was declared surplus in 1946. Responsibility for it was given to the War Assets Administration and was eventually acquired by the City of Pittsburg.

The airport saw airline flights from 1954 to 1960: Ozark Airlines Douglas DC-3s flew between Wichita, KS and St. Louis via Pittsburg, Joplin, and Springfield, MO.

== Facilities ==
The airport covers 742 acres (300 ha) at an elevation of 946 feet (288 m). It has two asphalt runways: 17/35 is 6,100 by 100 feet (1,859 m × 30 m), and 4/22 is 4,000 by 75 feet (1,219 m × 23 m).

In the year ending August 20, 2019, the airport had 23,700 aircraft operations, average 65 per day: 99% general aviation and <1% military. 29 aircraft were then based at this airport: 20 single-engine, 4 jet, 4 multi-engine, and 1 helicopter.

== See also ==
- Kansas World War II Army Airfields
- List of airports in Kansas
- 31st Flying Training Wing (World War II)
