= Hamilton Municipal Airport (Texas) =

- IATA: none; ICAO: KMNZ; FAA LID: MNZ

Summary
- Airport type: Public
- Owner: City of Hamilton
- Serves: Hamilton, Texas
- Location: Hamilton County, near Hamilton, Texas
- Elevation AMSL: 1,305 ft (398 m)
- Coordinates: 31°39′57″N 98°08′55″W
- Website: HamiltonTexas.com/...

Map
- Location within Texas

Runways
Direction	Length		Surface
Direction	ft	m	Surface
18/36	5,012	1,528	Asphalt

Statistics (2017)
- Aircraft operations (year ending 12/1/2017): 4,663
- Based aircraft: 26
- Source: Federal Aviation Administration

Hamilton Municipal Airport (ICAO: KMNZ, FAA LID: MNZ) is a city-owned public-use airport located two miles (3 km) south of the central business district in the city limits of Hamilton, in Hamilton County, Texas, United States.

Although most U.S. airports use the same three-letter location identifier for the FAA and IATA, Hamilton Municipal Airport is assigned MNZ by the FAA but has no designation from the IATA.

== Facilities and aircraft ==
Hamilton Municipal Airport covers an area of 250 acres (100 ha) which contains one runway designated 18/36 with a 5,012 x 75 ft (1,524 x 23 m) asphalt pavement. For the 12-month period ending December 1, 2017, the airport had 4,663 aircraft operations, an average of 89 per week: 62% general aviation, 4% air taxi and 33% military. At that time there were 26 aircraft based at this airport: 14 single-engine, 1 helicopter, and 11 glider.

== History ==
Provided contract glider training to the United States Army Air Forces, 23rd Glider Training Detachment, 31st Flying Training Wing, 1942–1944, commanded by Captain Angus Reid. Training provided by Hunter Flying Service. Used primarily C-47 Skytrains and Waco CG-4 unpowered Gliders. The mission of the school was to train glider pilot students in proficiency in operation of gliders in various types of towed and soaring flight, both day and night, and in servicing of gliders in the field.

== See also ==
- Texas World War II Army Airfields
- 31st Flying Training Wing (World War II)
- List of airports in Texas
