= 31st Flying Training Wing (World War II) =

Unit of the United States Army Air Forces

- AAF Shoulder Sleeve Insignia
- Active: 1943–1945
- Disbanded: 30 December 1945
- Country: United States
- Branch: Army Air Forces
- Type: Command and Control
- Role: Training
- Size: Wing
- Part of: Central Flying Training Command
- Garrison/HQ: Enid Field
- Colors: Ultramarine blue and golden orange
- Engagements: World War II – American Campaign

Insignia
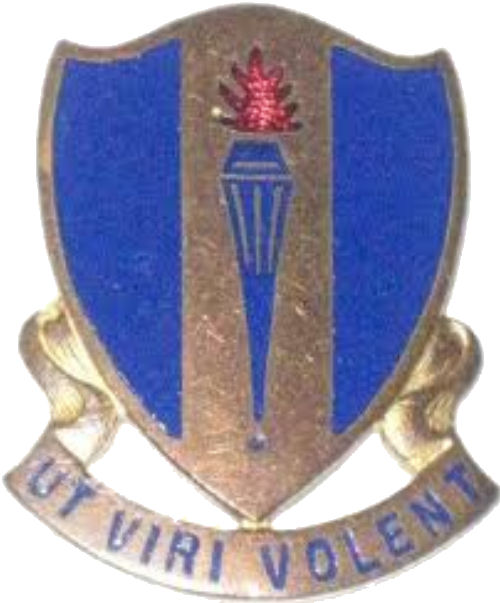
- Central Flying Training Command Distinctive Insignia

The 31st Flying Training Wing was a training formation of the U.S. Army Air Forces (AAF) during World War II.

The wing's mission was to train personnel of the U.S. Army Air Forces Training Command. Headquartered at Enid Field, Oklahoma, for most of its operational service, it controlled contract pilot schools primarily in the Central United States. There is no lineal connection to the 31st Fighter Wing.

== History ==
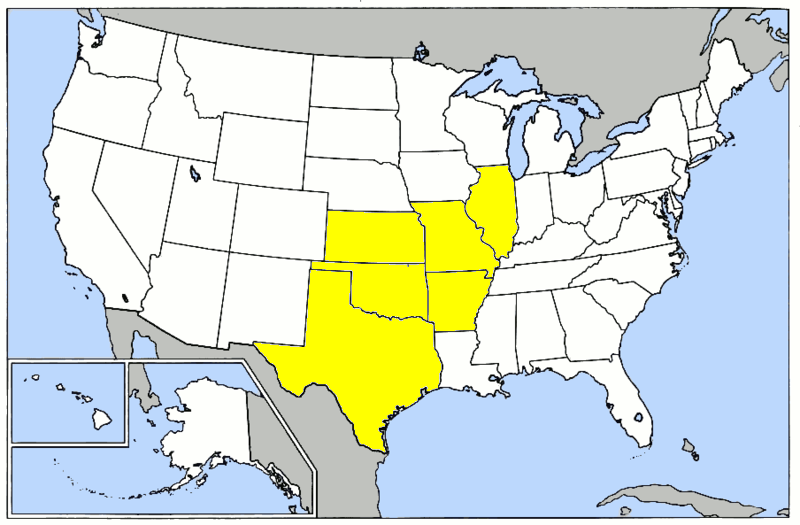
Central Flying Training Command area of operations during the war

Until 1939, the U.S. Army Air Corps provided all flying training with military instructor pilots. Beginning in 1939, it contracted with nine civilian flying schools to provide primary flight training. Primary training consisted of a three-month course of 65 hours of flying instruction. As the United States prepared to enter World War II by expanding its number of flying squadrons, the number of contract primary schools increased.

According to the contract, the government supplied students with training aircraft, flying clothes, textbooks, and equipment. The Air Corps also put a detachment at each school to supervise training. The schools furnished instructors, training sites and facilities, aircraft maintenance, quarters, and mess halls. From the Air Corps, schools received a flat fee of $1,170 for each graduate and $18 per flying hour for students eliminated from training. The Primary Pilot Training used Boeing PT-17 or Fairchild PT-19 two-seater single-engine training aircraft. Also, the wing controlled specialized schools for Liaison Pilots using the Stinson L-5 Sentinel, and Women Airforce Service Pilots (WASP) primary training was conducted exclusively at Avenger Field, Sweetwater, Texas.

Following the fall of France in 1940, the Air Corps upped its pilot production goal to 7,000 per year. To meet that goal, the Air Corps increased the capacity of its schools and added more contract primary schools. The vast majority of contract primary pilot training ended in the spring of 1944 as part of the rundown of Army pilot training. The ones remaining open ended their operations in October 1945.

=== Lineage ===
- Established as 31st Flying Training Wing on 17 December 1942

Activated on 16 January 1943
Disbanded on 30 December 1945

=== Assignments ===
- Army Air Forces Gulf Coast Training (later, AAF Central Flying Training) Command, 16 January 1943 – 30 December 1945

=== Stations ===
- Chickasha, Oklahoma, trained 8,000 troops at the Wilson and Bonfis Flying School that opened in October 1941, after the war it became Chickasha Municipal Airport.
- Enid Field, Oklahoma, 16 January 1943
- Fort Worth Field, Texas, 31–30 May 30 December 1945

=== Training aircraft ===
CPS Primary Trainers were primarily PT-17 Stearman biplanes and Fairchild PT-19s monoplanes, although a wide variety of other types could be found at the airfields. The Fairchild PT-19 aircraft also could have the student pilot covered with a hood for "Blind" instrument flying training.

Glider pilot schools used Aeronca TG-5As, Taylorcraft TG-6As, and Piper TG-8As unpowered glider conversions of powered light observation aircraft which had similar characteristics to the military gliders under development.

=== Contract Pilot Schools ===
Arledge Field, Stamford, Texas
308th Flying Training Detachment
Operated by: Stamford Flying School and Lou Foote Flying Service and Coleman Flying School
Opened: August 1941, Closed: August 1944 (PT-17, PT-19)
Controlled four auxiliary airfields

Avenger Field, Sweetwater, Texas
319th Flying Training Detachment
2563d Army Air Forces Base Unit (Women Air Service Pilots), April 1944
Operated by: Aviation Enterprises. Conducted Primary, Basic and Advanced (WASP) training
Opened: May 1942, Closed: December 1945 (PT-17, PT-19)
Controlled five auxiliary airfields

Bruce Field, Ballinger, Texas
306th Flying Training Detachment
Operated by: Fred Harmon Flying School
Opened: October 1941, Closed: October 1944 (PT-19)
Controlled five auxiliary airfields

Chickasha Municipal Airport, Chickasha, Oklahoma
316th Flying Training Detachment
2549th Army Air Forces Base Unit (Contract Pilot School, Primary), April 1944
Operated by: Wilson-Bonfils Flying School
Opened: October 1941, Closed: August 1945 (PT-17, PT-19)
Controlled four auxiliary airfields

Cimarron Field, Oklahoma City, Oklahoma
310th Flying Training Detachment
Operated by: Oklahoma Air College
Opened: October 1941, Closed: May 1944 (PT-19)
Controlled three auxiliary airfields

South Coleman Airport, Coleman, Texas
304th Flying Training Detachment
Operated by: Coleman FLying School, Limited
Opened: July 1941, Closed: November 1944 (PT-19)
Controlled four auxiliary airfields

Corsicana Field, Corsicana, Texas
301st Flying Training Detachment
Operated by: Air Activities of Texas
Opened: April 1941, Closed: November 1944 (PT-19)
Controlled six auxiliary airfields

Cuero Municipal Airport, Cuero, Texas
303d Flying Training Detachment
Operated by: Brayton Flying Services, Inc.
Opened: May 1941, Closed: August 1944 (PT-17, PT-19)
Controlled four auxiliary airfields

Gibbs Field, Fort Stockton, Texas
313th Flying Training Detachment
Operated by: Pacific Air School Limited
Opened: June 1942, Closed: April 1944 (PT-17, PT-19)
Controlled two auxiliary airfields

Garner Field, Uvalde, Texas
305th Flying Training Detachment
2566th Army Air Forces Base Unit (Contract Pilot School, Primary), April 1944
Operated by: Hangar Six, Incorporated
Opened: October 1941, Closed: July 1945 (PT-13, PT-19)
Controlled four auxiliary airfields

Grider Field, Pine Bluff, Arkansas
312th Flying Training Detachment
Operated by: Pine Bluff School of Aviation
Opened: April 1941, Closed: October 1944 (PT-19)
Controlled five auxiliary airfields

Harvey Parks Airport, Sikeston, Missouri
311th Flying Training Detachment
Operated by: Missouri Institute of Aeronautics
Opened: January 1941, Closed: November 1944 (PT-18, PT-19)
Controlled seven auxiliary airfields

Hatbox Field, Muskogee, Oklahoma
315th Flying Training Detachment
Operated by Spartan Aircraft Company and Spartan School of Aeronautics
Opened: January 1941, Closed: June 1944 (PT-19)
Controlled three auxiliary airfields

Hicks Field, Fort Worth, Texas
307th Flying Training Detachment
Operated by: Texas Aviation School and W. F. Long Flying School.
Opened: September 1941, Closed: May 1944 (PT-19)
Controlled three auxiliary airfields

Jones Field, Bonham, Texas
302d Flying Training Detachment
Operated by: Bonham Aviation School
Opened: September 1941, Closed: November 1944 (PT-19)
Controlled four auxiliary airfields

Miami Municipal Airport, Miami, Oklahoma
322d Flying Training Detachment
Operated by: Spartan School of Aeronautics
Opened: June 1941, Closed: March 1944 (PT-17, PT-19)
Controlled four auxiliary airfields

Mustang Field, El Reno, Oklahoma
320th Flying Training Detachment
Operated by: Midwest Air School
Opened: February 1943, Closed: November 1944 (PT-17, PT-19)
Controlled four auxiliary airfields

Parks Metropolitan Airport, East St. Louis, Illinois
309th Flying Training Detachment
Operated by: Parks Air College
Opened: June 1939, Closed: August 1943 (PT-13, PT-17, PT-19)
Controlled one auxiliary airfield

Ponca City Municipal Airport, Ponca City, Oklahoma
323d Flying Training Detachment
Operated by: Darr School of Aeronautics
Opened: June 1941, Closed: May 1944 (PT-17, PT-19)

Tulsa Municipal Airport, Tulsa, Oklahoma
314th Flying Training Detachment
Operated by: Spartan School of Aeronautics
Opened: June 1939, Closed: August 1944 (PT-3A, PT-17, PT-19)
Controlled five auxiliary airfields

Victory Field, Vernon, Texas
317th Flying Training Detachment
Operated by: Hunter Flying Service and Richey Flying Service.
Opened: December 1941, Closed: August 1944 (PT-19)
Controlled five auxiliary airfields

=== Contract Glider Pilot Schools ===
Aberdeen Regional Airport, Aberdeen, South Dakota
26th Glider Training Detachment
Basic Glider Training School (TG-8A)
Operated by: Anderson & Brennan Flying Service

Eberts Field, Lohoke, Arkansas
15th Glider Training Detachment
Pre-Glider/Primary Training School (TG-8A)
Operated by: Kenneth Starnes Flying Service

Renner Field, Goodland, Kansas
22d Glider Training Detachment
Pre-Glider/Primary Training School (TG-8A)
Operated by: William A. Ong

Hale County Airport, Plainview, Texas
4th Glider Training Detachment
Basic Glider Training School (TG-4A, TG-5, TG-8A)
Operated by: Clint Breedlove Aerial Service

Hartlee Field Airport, Denton, Texas
17th Glider Training Detachment
Basic Glider Training School (TG-4A, TG-5, TG-8A)
Operated by: Harte Flying Service

Hays Airport, Hays, Kansas
19th Glider Training Detachment
Pre-Glider/Primary Training School (TG-8A)
Operated by: Morey Airplane Company

Janesville Field, Janesville, Wisconsin
16th Glider Training Detachment
Basic Glider Training School (TG-4A, TG-5, TG-8A)
Operated by: Bonham Aviation School

Okmulgee Municipal Airport, Okmulgee, Oklahoma
25th Glider Training Detachment
Pre-Glider/Primary Training School
Operated by: Sooner Air Training Corp.

Pittsburg Airport, Pittsburg, Kansas
21st Glider Training Detachment
Pre-Glider Training School (TG-8A)
Operated by: McFarland Flying Service

Spencer Municipal Airport, Spencer, Iowa
23d Glider Training Detachment
Pre-Glider/Primary Training School(TG-8A)
Operated by: Hunter Flying Service
Hunter Flying Service moved from Spencer, Iowa, to Hamilton Airport at Hamilton, Texas, on 20 October 1942.

Theldor Airfield, Vinita, Oklahoma
27th Glider Training Detachment
Pre-Glider/Primary Training School (TG-8A)
Operated by: Burke Aviation Service

== See also ==
- Other Training Command Primary Flight Training Wings:

29th Flying Training Wing (Primary flight training wing for AAF Eastern Flying Training Command)
36th Flying Training Wing (Primary flight training wing for AAF Western Flying Training Command)

- Other Central Flying Training Command Flight Training Wings:

32d Flying Training Wing (Basic Flight Training)
33d Flying Training Wing (Advanced Flight Training, Two Engine)
34th Flying Training Wing (Bombardier and Specialized Two/Four-Engine Training)
77th Flying Training Wing (Advanced Flight Training, Single Engine)
78th Flying Training Wing (Classification/Preflight Unit)
80th Flying Training Wing (Navigation and Glider)

== List of wing commanders ==
- BG Warren R. Carter, 16 January 1943
- BG T.W. Blackburn, 26 April 1943
- Col Henry W. Door, 10 April 1944
- BG Aubry Hornsby, 22 May 1944
- Col James F. Powell, 15 June 1944
- Col Walter S. Lee, 31 July 1944
- BG Charles T. Myers, c. Nov 1944 (Additional Duty)
- Col Walter S. Lee, 16 December 1944
- BG John F. Egan, 4 January 1945
- Col Hilbert M. Wittkop, 23 Apr–31 Oct 1945
- Unknown through 30 December 1945.
