= CCSS (disambiguation) =

CCSS may refer to:

== Education and academia ==
=== Grade school ===
- Common Core State Standards Initiative, a set of educational standards
- Council of Chief State School Officers, a non-partisan non-profit organization
- Central Community School System, in Louisiana, United States
- Castries Comprehensive Secondary School, in Vide Bouteille, Castries, Saint Lucia
- Catholic Central Separate School — see Catholic Central High School (London, Ontario)
- Cumberland Community Schools Society — see School District 71 Comox Valley

=== Junior college ===
- Cambridge Centre for Sixth-form Studies, an independent six-form college
- Community College Survey of Student Engagement, a survey of people in a community college
- College of Computer Studies and Systems at Abra Valley Colleges

=== Other uses in education and academia ===
- Command and Control Systems School, now Communications School (United States Marine Corps)
- Center for Catalysis and Surface Science — see List of Northwestern University buildings § Science and research buildings
- Court, Council and Senate Secretariat of Hong Kong University of Science and Technology
- Intercontinental Church Society § The Colonial Church and School Society, 1851–61 — see Thomas Hughes (priest, born 1818) and Dresden, Ontario
- CCSS, the code for a Bachelor in Contemporary China Studies at the Centre for China Studies

== Government and politics ==
- Cass Community Social Services, an American nonprofit focused on political activism
- Costa Rican Social Security Fund (Spanish: Caja Costarricense de Seguro Social), the governmental entity in charge of most of the public health sector of Costa Rica
- Centre Commun de la Securite Sociale, the social security system for social welfare in Luxembourg
- Coordinating Council of Southern States, of which South Sudanese politician Clement Wani Konga became a minister
- Centre for Civil Society Strengthening — see Women in Malawi and Malawi Parliamentary Women's Caucus
- Clark County Social Service, a user of Cúram Software

== Computing and telecommunications ==
- Comcast/Charter Sports Southeast, an American television network
- Common Computing Security Standards Forum (CCSS Forum)
- Customer Complaint Settlement Scheme, a voluntary mediation scheme implemented by Hong Kong's Office of the Communications Authority — see Consumer Council
- Common Configuration Scoring System — see Security Content Automation Protocol
- Common Channel Signaling System — see Bell System Practices and Signalling System No. 7
- CCSS, a company acquired by cybersecurity company HelpSystems (now Fortra)
- Constraint Cascading Style Sheets, a CSS extension implemented using Cassowary (software)
- Communication Center Shift Supervisor, a staff member at the Winnipeg Fire Paramedic Service § WFPS Communication Centre
- Command and Control Systems School, now Communications School (United States Marine Corps)
- College of Computer Studies and Systems at Abra Valley Colleges

== Other uses ==
- Chinese Cinema Study Society, the producer of Yan Ruisheng and Zhang Xinsheng (film)
- CCSS, a scribal abbreviation for Consulibus duobus
- CC.SS., an abbreviation for Spanish: ciencias sociales, lit. 'social sciences' — see Ana Marta González and José Rodríguez Elizondo

== See also ==
- Centro Cultural e de Solidariedade Social de Guifões (CCSS Guifões), a youth team that Ricardo Fernandes (futsal player) was on
- CCSS Lingolsheim, the club of French high jumper Brigitte Rougeron
- CCS (disambiguation)
