= Ana González =

Ana González may refer to:

- Ana González (fashion designer) (born 1970), Spanish fashion designer
- Ana González (footballer) (born 1995), Spanish footballer
- Ana González Olea (1915–2008), Chilean theater, radio, and television actress
- Ana González de Recabarren (1925–2018), Chilean human rights activist
- Ana Cristina González, Mexican football manager
- Ana María González, several people
- Ana Marta González (born 1969), Spanish professor and philosopher
- Ana Patricia González (born 1987), Mexican beauty queen
- Ana Stephanie Vaquer González (born 1993), Chilean professional wrestler

== See also ==
- Ana María González (disambiguation), several people
- Ana Gonçalves (disambiguation)
