= Marine Wing Support Squadron 374 =

Aviation ground support unit of US Marine Corps

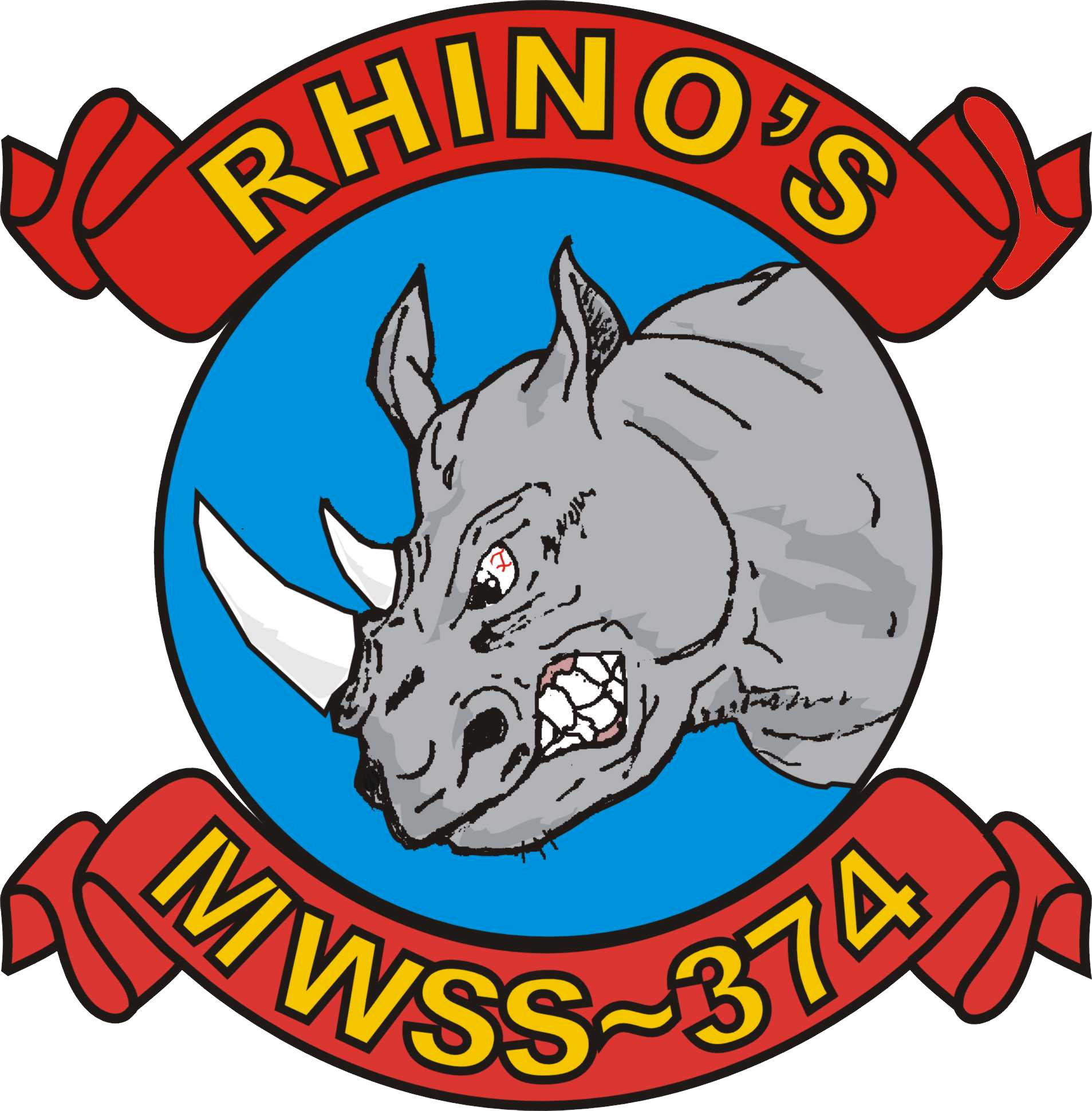
- MWSS-374's insignia
- Active: 2 June 1986 – 31 March 2022
- Country: United States
- Allegiance: United States of America
- Branch: United States Marine Corps
- Type: Aviation ground support battalion
- Size: 500+
- Part of: Marine Aircraft Group 16; 3rd Marine Aircraft Wing
- Garrison/HQ: Marine Corps Air Ground Combat Center Twentynine Palms
- Nickname: Rhinos
- Motto: "Keep Charging"
- Engagements: Operation Iraqi Freedom

Commanders
- Current commander: LtCol David A. Merles

Marine Wing Support Squadron 374 (MWSS 374) was an aviation ground support unit of the United States Marine Corps. They were based out of Marine Corps Air Ground Combat Center Twentynine Palms, California. The squadron was part of Marine Wing Support Group 37 and the 3rd Marine Aircraft Wing. MWSS-374 was officially deactivated on 31 March 2022, at Marine Corp Air Ground Combat Center,(MCAGCC) 29 Palms, Ca. during a Sunset Ceremony.

== Mission ==
They are responsible for the day-to-day operations of the Twentynine Palms Expeditionary Airfield at MCAGCC, 29 Palms, CA.

== History ==
In March 1977, General Louis H. Wilson, the 26th Commandant of the Marine Corps, activated the Expeditionary Airfield (EAF). The initial unit placed in charge of the EAF was designated Detachment MABS-11. Two years later, in July 1979, Detachment MABS-11 became operationally attached to Marine Aircraft Group 16 and was redesignated MAG-16, Detachment Bravo in 1982. Originally, only a cadre of Marines provided caretaker support for the EAF between exercises. However, during October 1989

MWSS-173 was transferred from Marine Corps Air Station Kaneohe Bay to the Marine Corps Air Ground Combat Center, Twentynine Palms in support of the EAF. 1990 MWSS-374 MCAS Tustin CA, was tasked with Support During Operation Desert Shield and Desert Storm. Elements of MWSS-374 were in Country well prior to the beginning of the Gulf War, until relieved in late 1991, additionally some Elements Served in Kuwait during Combat. On 4 March 1993, MWSS-173 was deactivated and Aviation Ground Support Element (AGSE) was activated to continue operating and maintaining the EAF. On 1 April 1999, AGSE deactivated and was redesignated as Marine Wing Support Squadron-374. Currently the squadron is nearly 525 strong, and possesses the ability to operate a portable and tactical airfield including and maintaining ground support equipment for aircraft.

Air traffic control services and maintenance are provided by a detachment of Marines from MACS-1 Det EAF, a subordinate unit of Marine Aircraft Group 16 (MACG-38). In the early '90s, the ATC operations were handled by MATCS-18 Det C (Marine Air Traffic Control Squadron 18, Detachment C) who operated under MWSS-173.

== Global War on Terrorism ==
MWSS-374 deployed to Iraq in support of Operation Iraqi Freedom from February 2004 until August 2004, February 2006 until August 2006, and again from March 2008 to October 2008. MWSS-374 was also deployed in support of Operation Inherent Resolve from September 2014 to April 2015.

== See also ==
- United States Marine Corps Aviation
- Organization of the United States Marine Corps
- List of United States Marine Corps aviation support units
