= Merritt A. Edson =

United States Marine Corps general and Medal of Honor recipient (1897–1955)

Merritt Austin Edson
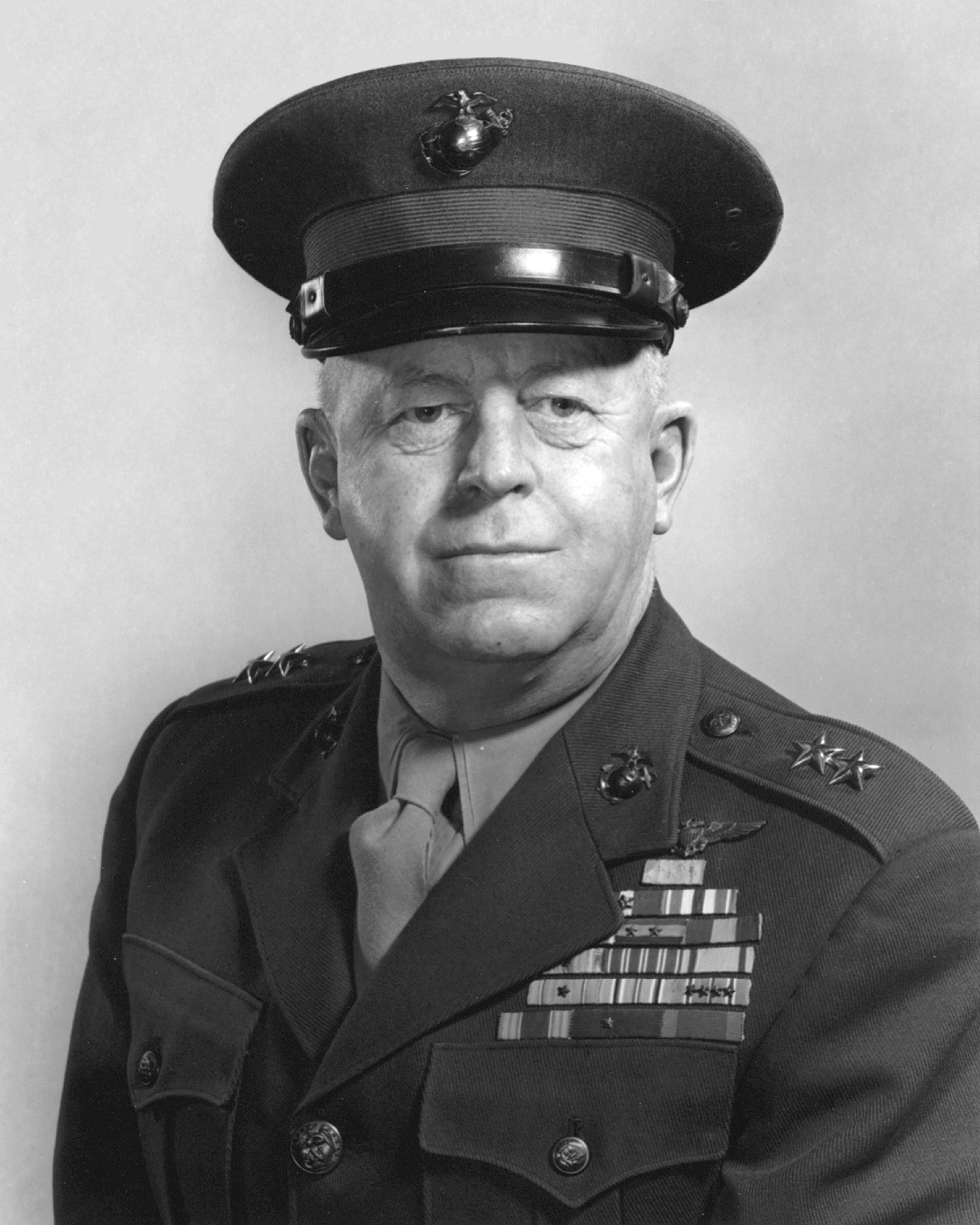
- "Red Mike" Edson
- Born: April 25, 1897; Rutland, Vermont, US
- Died: August 14, 1955 (aged 58); Washington, D.C., US
- Burial place: Arlington National Cemetery
- Spouse: Ethel Winifred Robbins Edson (1896–1985)
- Children: Merritt Austin Edson Jr. Herbert Robbins Edson
- Military career
- Allegiance: United States of America
- Branch: United States Marine Corps
- Service years: 1917–1947
- Rank: Major general
- Nicknames: Red Mike; Mad Merritt the Morgue Master
- Units: 4th Marine Regiment; 2nd Marine Division; 1st Marine Division
- Commands: 1st Marine Raider Battalion; 5th Marine Regiment; Service Command
- Conflicts: World War I; Banana Wars; Occupation of Nicaragua; World War II; Guadalcanal Campaign; Battle of Saipan; Battle of Tinian
- Awards: Medal of Honor; Navy Cross (2); Silver Star; Legion of Merit (2); Distinguished Service Order (United Kingdom)
- Other work: Commissioner of the Vermont State Police; Executive Director of the National Rifle Association of America

Merritt Austin Edson, Sr. (April 25, 1897 – August 14, 1955), known as "Red Mike", was a major general in the United States Marine Corps, First President of the Marine Corps War Memorial Foundation and First Commissioner of the Vermont Department of Public Safety & Vermont State Police.

Among the decorations he received were the Medal of Honor, two Navy Crosses, the Silver Star, and two Legions of Merit. He is best known by Marines for the defense of Lunga Ridge during the Guadalcanal Campaign in World War II.

He received a commission as a second lieutenant in the Marines in October 1917, and served in France and Germany in World War I. After the war he held several positions until going to flight school in 1922. After graduating flight school and being designated a Naval Aviator, he performed several assignments in Central America and China. It was in Central America where he received his first Navy Cross and the Nicaraguan Medal of Merit with Silver Star.

When World War II started, Edson was sent as the commanding officer of the Marine Raiders and earned his second Navy Cross on Tulagi. When his unit was sent to Guadalcanal, Edson led his men in fighting for which he would later receive the Medal of Honor.

After World War II, Edson held several commands until retiring from the Marine Corps on August 1, 1947. After retirement he had several jobs, including the director of the National Rifle Association of America (NRA).

== Early years ==
Edson was born in Rutland, Vermont and grew up in Chester. After graduating from Chester High School in 1915, he attended the University of Vermont for two years. On June 27, 1916, he left college as a member of the First Infantry Regiment, Vermont National Guard, and was sent to Eagle Pass, Texas, for duty on the Mexican border. He returned to the university in September 1916, but joined the Marine Corps Reserve on June 26, the following year.

== Early career ==
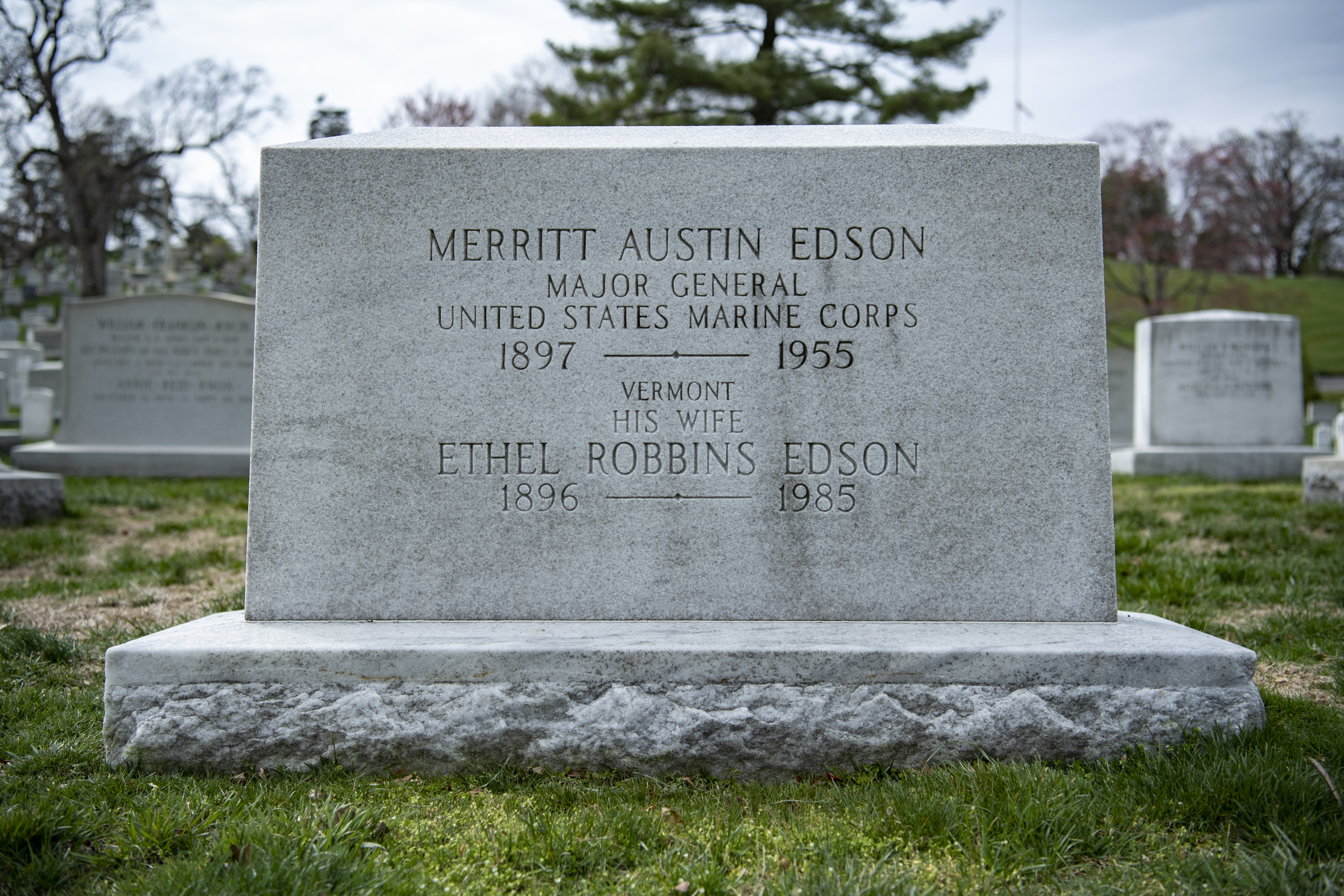
Grave at Arlington National Cemetery

Edson was commissioned a second lieutenant in the Marine Corps on October 9, 1917. On September 30th of the next year, he sailed for France from Philadelphia with B Company of the 11th Marines, and arrived in Brest on October 13, 1918. Edson's first deployment had an inauspicious beginning, as he immediately became sick with mumps and spent the rest of the month in Brest's Camp Hospital #33 before rejoining B Company at Issoudun on November 9.

This regiment saw no combat, but during the last six months of his European tour, he commanded Company D, 15th Separate Marine Battalion, which had been organized for the express purpose of assisting in the holding of a plebiscite in Schleswig-Holstein, Germany. Owing to the failure of the United States to ratify the Treaty of Versailles, this mission was never carried out.

Following the end of World War I, he was assigned to several positions that would qualify him for the high commands he was to hold in later years. He was promoted to first lieutenant on June 4, 1920, and spent two years at Marine Barracks, Quantico, Virginia, as the Adjutant-Registrar of the Marine Corps Institute, after which he was sent on a short tour in Louisiana guarding the mail. His interest in military aviation prompted him to apply for flight training at NAS Pensacola, Florida and he earned his gold wings as a Naval Aviator in 1922. Soon after, he was ordered to the Marine Air Station at Guam where he had his introduction to the semitropical islands of the Marianas with which his name was later to become so closely linked.

=== Plane crash ===
Edson's career as a naval aviator came to an ignominious end following his return to the continental United States in 1925. In March 1926, Edson received orders to the U.S. Army Air Service's Advanced Flying School at Kelly Field, Texas. By May, he had been found physically unqualified to complete the course due to defective depth perception, and sent back to the First Aviation Group in Quantico to receive a flight physical.

Unable to complete Advanced Flying School, Edson received new orders for the Company Officers' Course scheduled to begin in September at Quantico. Meanwhile, the flight physical identified only a minor depth perception defect, in the flight surgeon's opinion too minor to affect Edson's flying. An inquiry among officers who had been in the course with Edson revealed he had been grounded after 44 hours of solo flight in DH's due to his poor flying abilities. When questioned about this directly, Edson admitted he had taken more than the usual time to solo DSs and F-5s in Pensacola.

The flight surgeon recommended that Edson be grounded for several months with weekly depth perception tests to see if the condition improved. Even after this period, Edson's commander, Maj O.A. Lutz banned him from flying O2B-1s. On 22 January 1927, Edson tried to prove his flying ability by defying this ban to take an O2B-1 on a cross country flight to Hampton Roads. He crashed in Ark, Virginia.

The plane was "practically destroyed," and the subsequent investigation was damning. Edson claimed the crash was caused by a forced landing due to the motor cutting out, but this had happened over a field subsequently found to be large and flat enough for a landing in almost any direction. Edson admitted he overshot the field, but the investigation found even with the motor cut out the plane had enough power and elevation that he could have circled around to make another attempt rather than crash. Finally, in addition to violating the ban on flying O2B-1s, Edson had been restricted to the area of the field at the time of the flight.

Edson was grounded immediately, and received another flight physical on January 24. In combination with the aftermath of Edson's rejection from the Kelly Field course, the flight surgeon had to conclude Edson's problems were mental rather than physical, writing "It would appear that he not only showed bad flying judgement, he lost his head." On February 18, Edson's flight orders were permanently revoked retroactive to the date of the physical.

Edson remained with First Aviation Group while completing the Company Officers Course. Following this, Marine Corps Aviation Section head Edwin Brainard requested that Edson be transferred to a line organization.

=== Marine Corps Supply Activity and Rifle Team ===
On April 14, 1927, Edson received orders to the Marine Barracks at the Philadelphia Navy Yard. In Philadelphia, Edson's luck would finally change for the better. In short order, he became the ordinance officer at the Marine Corps Supply Activity, and in May received orders for temporary duty at Quantico assisting the Marine Corps Rifle and Pistol Team. This would become a regular arrangement for the next several years, with Edson repeatedly returning from the Depot of Supplies on temporary orders as either a coach or team captain.

On August 16, 1927, while preparing for national matches at Camp Perry, Edson requested orders to Haiti as soon as the matches were completed. Though Edson noted he had a working knowledge of French and had not had foreign shore duty since July 1925, his request was denied. However, several months later, on November 14, Edson received orders to the USS Denver to take over its Marine detachment.

=== Central America and China ===
During service in Central American waters, his detachment was ashore in Nicaragua during the period February 1928 – 1929. In command of 160 hand-picked and specially trained Marines, he fought twelve separate engagements with the Sandino-led guerrilla fighters and denied them the use of the Poteca and Coco River valleys. Here, he received his first Navy Cross for actions in which "his exhibition of coolness, intrepidity, and dash so inspired his men that superior forces of bandits were driven from their prepared positions and severe losses inflicted upon them." From a grateful Nicaraguan government, he was also awarded the Nicaraguan Medal of Merit with Silver Star.

In September 1929, he returned to the United States and was assigned as tactics instructor to fledgling Marine lieutenants at The Basic School in Philadelphia. Upon detachment from that duty, he became ordnance and war plans officer at the Philadelphia Depot of Supplies for the next four years.

This ordnance duty was not new to him since he had been closely associated with the development of small arms marksmanship within the Marine Corps. In 1921, he had been a firing member of the winning Marine Corps Team at the National Matches at Camp Perry, Ohio. In 1927, 1930, and 1931, he served with the rifle and pistol teams as assistant coach. During the regional matches of 1932 and 1933, he acted as team coach and captain, respectively. Upon the resumption of the National Matches in 1935, he was the captain of the Marine Corps national rifle and pistol teams of 1935 and 1936, winning the national trophies in both years.

After short tours at Marine Corps Recruit Depot Parris Island and Marine Corps Headquarters in Washington, D.C., he was enrolled in the Senior Officers' Course at the Marine Corps Schools, Quantico, Virginia in 1936. He was promoted to major on February 9, 1936. Foreign duty as operations officer with the 4th Marines in Shanghai, China from 1937 to 1939, enabled him to observe closely Japanese military operations.

His second tour of duty at Marine Corps Headquarters began in May 1939 when, as Inspector of Target Practice, he was in a position to stress the importance of every Marine being highly skilled with his own individual arm. He was promoted to lieutenant colonel on April 1, 1940.

== World War II ==
=== Raider battalion ===
In June 1941, he was again transferred to Quantico, to command the 1st Battalion, 5th Marines, which was redesignated the 1st Separate Battalion in January 1942. The training exercises which he conducted in the succeeding months with Navy high speed transports led to the organization of the 1st Marine Raider Battalion in early 1942. This unit was the prototype of every Marine Raider battalion formed throughout the war. He was promoted to colonel on May 21, 1942.

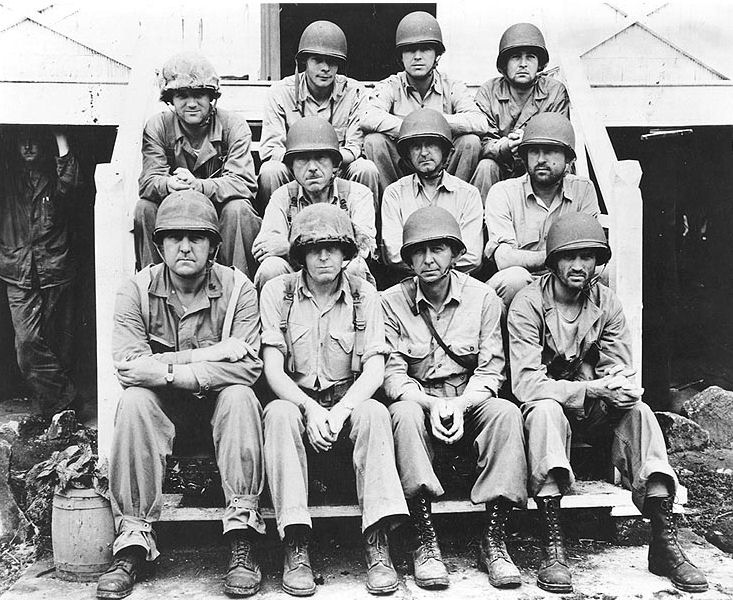
Colonel Edson (front row, second from left) poses for a group photo with other Marine officers on Tulagi shortly after the battle in August, 1942.

Colonel Edson's introduction to the Pacific theater of operations began with the overseas training of his raider command in American Samoa. On August 7, 1942, his raiders, together with the 2nd Battalion, 5th Marines, landed on Tulagi, British Solomon Islands. Two days of severe fighting secured this strategic island in the Battle of Tulagi. After his battalion relocated to Guadalcanal, they conducted raids on Savo Island and at Tasimboko, on Guadalcanal. He was awarded a Gold Star in lieu of a second Navy Cross for his successful conduct of the Tulagi operation.

=== Guadalcanal ===
The battle he is best known for was the defense of Lunga Ridge on Guadalcanal on September 12–14, 1942. His raider battalion and two attached companies of the 1st Parachute Battalion were sent to a ridge line a short distance south of Henderson Field. Here, they were supposed to get a short rest but Japanese forces unexpectedly attacked the position on the first evening, penetrating the left center of his line of resistance, forcing a withdrawal to a reserve position.

Approximately 800 Marines withstood the repeated assaults of more than 3,000 Japanese on the "Bloody Ridge", as it came to be called. To the men of the 1st Raider Battalion, however, who sustained 256 casualties, it became "Edson's Ridge", in high honor of the officer who "was all over the place, encouraging, cajoling, and correcting as he continually exposed himself to enemy fire." His nickname, "Red Mike", originating from his red beard worn in Nicaragua days, was also his code name during this battle. From then on, he was known by all as "Red Mike". It was for this action—the Battle of Edson's Ridge—that he received the Medal of Honor.

After Edson's Ridge, he was placed in command of the 5th Marine Regiment. In this capacity, he was one of the primary leaders in the Matanikau actions from September 23 to October 9, 1942. He also commanded the 5th Marines during the Battle for Henderson Field until the regiment was withdrawn from Guadalcanal, along with the rest of the 1st Marine Division, in November 1942. Shortly after, another officer stated "that officers and men would willingly follow him anywhere—the only problem was to keep up with him". A combat correspondent testified that "he is not a fierce Marine. In fact he appears almost shy. Yet Colonel Edson is probably among the five finest combat commanders in all the United States armed forces." It was also said that he was not readily given to a show of emotion but when his personal runner of several months' service was killed at the Matanikau River on Guadalcanal, witnesses said he "cried like a baby", and later stated that the man could never be replaced.

=== Higher commands and more battles ===
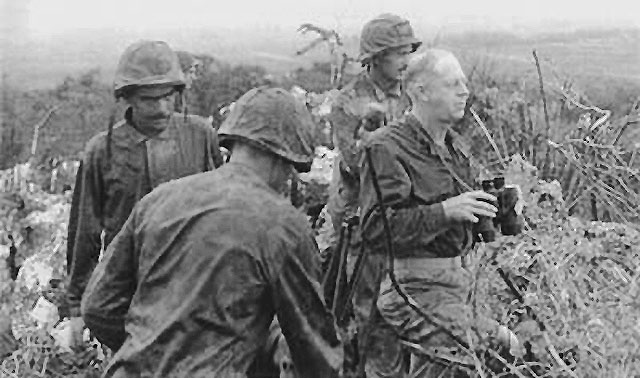
Brigadier General Edson surveying the front lines on Tinian

In August 1943, he was named chief of staff of the 2nd Marine Division, which was then preparing for the invasion of Tarawa. He prepared an estimate of the situation for this operation which proved to be surprisingly accurate and has since become a classic in Marine Corps military literature. For this action, he received the Legion of Merit and was promoted to brigadier general on December 1, 1943. Later, he was appointed assistant division commander of the 2nd Marine Division and participated in this capacity in the capture of Saipan and Tinian. The Silver Star was awarded him for these operations.

Brigadier General Edson became chief of staff, Fleet Marine Force, Pacific, and in October 1944 was awarded a Gold Star in lieu of a second Legion of Merit. His duty as commanding general, Service Command, Fleet Marine Force, Pacific, rounded out 44 months of continuous service in the war zone. When a young officer asked him when he might expect to be rotated back to the United States, Edson replied, "When the war's over; when the job's done."

== Retirement ==
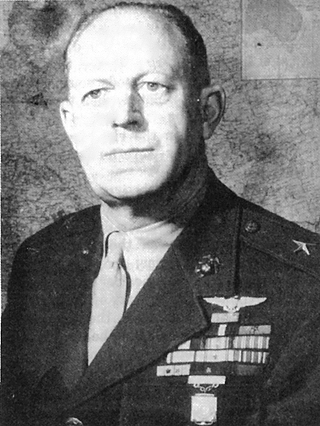
Edson as a brigadier general

In December 1945, Edson was assigned as the senior Marine Corps officer on the staff of the Chief of Naval Operations and, in February 1947, to Marine Corps Headquarters. The final year of Edson's Marine Corps career would be consumed with controversy related to the National Security Act of 1947.

On January 9, 1947, Edson was admitted to Bethesda Naval Hospital, ultimately receiving a hemilaminectomy at the end of the month, and would recover there until March 10. In February, while still recovering, Edson received a copy of what would become Senate Bill 758 from a Vermont senator, who asked for his thoughts on it. This analysis consumed Edson's remaining time in the hospital.

Edson was horrified. He believed the bill, which would unify the War Department and Department of the Navy, could undermine civilian oversight of the military by placing the entire military under a powerful secretary of defense who could, at least in theory, become a threat to the republic. Perhaps more significantly, he believed it would lead to the disbanding of the Marine Corps as an unnecessary secondary army.

After the Truman administration required all criticism of the legislation from active military to be routed through the White House rather than go directly to Congress, Edson retired and delivered a blistering critique of it in hearings. On October 15, 1947, Edson prepared a letter documenting what had actually happened, and requested that the Commandant add it to his official personnel file.

Retirement from active duty came at the age of 50 after more than 30 years of military service. He was promoted to major general at the time of his retirement on August 1, 1947.

Following retirement from the Marine Corps he became the first commissioner of the Vermont State Police, organizing the force partially from an older organization of motor vehicle officers. He established the organization on a paramilitary basis which has since been adopted by other states. He served as president of the National Rifle Association 1949–1950.

In July 1951, after returning to Washington, D.C., he became executive director of the National Rifle Association, where his major efforts in that post were stimulating the interest of Americans in rifle marksmanship. Concurrently, he campaigned vigorously for a Marine Corps adequate both in size and strength for its many commitments.

He died on August 14, 1955, in Washington, D.C., by his own hand, having committed suicide by carbon monoxide poisoning in the garage next to his Washington, D.C. home while serving in the NRA post. At the time of his death, in addition to his duties at the NRA, he was the navy representative on the Defense Advisory Committee on Prisoner of War Problems. This group recommended the standards of conduct for American prisoners of war that were later adopted and issued as the Code of Conduct for all American servicemen.

He was buried at Arlington National Cemetery.

== Awards ==
Major General Edson's decorations included:

Naval Aviator Badge
1st row	Medal of Honor	Navy Cross w/ 2nd award star	Silver Star	Legion of Merit w/ 2nd award star combat V
2nd row	Combat Action Ribbon	Navy Presidential Unit Citation w/ 2 service stars	Mexican Service Medal	World War I Victory Medal w/ Maltese cross
3rd row	Nicaraguan Campaign Medal (1933)	China Service Medal w/ 1 service star	American Defense Service Medal w/ Fleet clasp	American Campaign Medal
4th row	Asiatic-Pacific Campaign Medal w/ 4 service stars	World War II Victory Medal	Nicaraguan Presidential Medal of Merit with star	Distinguished Service Order

=== Medal of Honor citation ===
The President of the United States takes pleasure in presenting the MEDAL OF HONOR to COLONEL MERRITT A. EDSON
UNITED STATES MARINE CORPS for service as set forth in the following CITATION:

For extraordinary heroism and conspicuous intrepidity above and beyond the call of duty as Commanding Officer of the 1st Marine Raider Battalion, with Parachute Battalion attached, during action against enemy Japanese forces in the Solomon Islands on the night of 13–14 September 1942. After the airfield on Guadalcanal had been seized from the enemy on August 8, Col. Edson, with a force of 800 men, was assigned to the occupation and defense of a ridge dominating the jungle on either side of the airport. Facing a formidable Japanese attack which, augmented by infiltration, had crashed through our front lines, he, by skillful handling of his troops, successfully withdrew his forward units to a reserve line with minimum casualties. When the enemy, in a subsequent series of violent assaults, engaged our force in desperate hand-to-hand combat with bayonets, rifles, pistols, grenades, and knives, Col. Edson, although continuously exposed to hostile fire throughout the night, personally directed defense of the reserve position against a fanatical foe of greatly superior numbers. By his astute leadership and gallant devotion to duty, he enabled his men, despite severe losses, to cling tenaciously to their position on the vital ridge, thereby retaining command not only of the Guadalcanal airfield, but also of the 1st Division's entire offensive installations in the surrounding area.

/S/Franklin D. Roosevelt

=== First Navy Cross citation ===
Citation:

The Navy Cross is presented to Merritt Austin Edson, Captain, U.S. Marine Corps, for extraordinary heroism on August 7, 1928, while in command of a Marine patrol on the Coco River, en route to Poteca. Captain Edson upon encountering a force of bandits entrenched upon both sides of the river, personally led his advance guard against the enemy, engaging in hand-to-hand conflict with them, and by his exhibition of coolness, intrepidity, and dash, so inspired his men that the superior force of bandits were driven from their prepared position, and severe losses inflicted upon them.

=== Second Navy Cross citation ===
Citation:

The President of the United States takes pleasure in presenting a Gold Star in lieu of a Second Award of the Navy Cross to Merritt Austin Edson (0–257), Colonel, U.S. Marine Corps, for extraordinary heroism and devotion to duty while serving as Commanding Officer of the Tulagi Combat Group during the landing assault and seizure of enemy Japanese-held Tulagi Island, British Solomon Islands, 7 to August 9, 1942. In personal command of the FIRST Marine Raider Battalion during the initial operation, Colonel Edson advanced the attack of his Battalion and its supporting units with such skill, courage and aggressiveness that he was an inspiration to the entire Combat Group and was directly responsible for the capture of Tulagi Island. His gallant conduct throughout this hazardous action was in keeping with the highest traditions of the United States Naval Service.

=== Silver Star citation ===
Citation:

The President of the United States of America takes pleasure in presenting the Silver Star to Brigadier General Merritt Austin Edson (MCSN: 0-257), United States Marine Corps, for conspicuous gallantry and intrepidity as Assistant Commander of the SECOND Marine Division during operations against enemy Japanese forces on the Islands of Saipan and Tinian in the Marianas group, from 15 June to 1 August 1944. Responsible for the supervision and training of the SECOND Marine Division, Brigadier General Edson brought the regiments of his fighting organization to a high state of combat readiness in preparation for the Marianas Campaign. Landing at Saipan in the early afternoon of 15 June, he moved his men in under heavy enemy artillery and mortar fire, established communications with elements ashore and vigilantly maintained direct contact until the establishment of the Division Command Post ashore. Cool and courageous, he repeatedly risked his life to visit the front line units, rallying his men and providing expert tactical advice during critical stages of the battle as the Second Division forces pushed relentlessly against fanatic Japanese resistance to render valiant service during the assault and aid in the ultimate capture of Saipan on 9 July. Participating in the invasion of Tinian on 24 July, Brigadier General Edson again demonstrated outstanding qualities of leadership, military acumen and personal valor during the aggressive, sustained drive which resulted in the seizure of this second fiercely defended enemy base in the strategically important Marianas Group on 1 August 1944. Stouthearted and indomitable, Brigadier General Edson contributes substantially to the success of our offensive operations in the Pacific Theater and, his brilliant combat skill, unfailing judgment and iron determination in the face of tremendous opposition reflect the highest traditions of the United States Naval Service.

== Other honors ==

Edson Hall

In addition to the Medal of Honor and his other military awards, Edson also received several marksmanship awards including the Distinguished Rifleman Badge in 1927.

=== Edson Range ===
A part of Camp Pendleton's Stuart Mesa area was named Edson Range in his honor in 1964. Edson Range was built to replace the one at Camp Matthews in La Jolla. The range is used for teaching marksmanship training to recruits from Marine Corps Recruit Depot San Diego. On October 28, 2008, more than 200 volunteers unveiled a monument in honor of Major General Edson during a ceremony at Edson Range. The volunteers used rocks and recycled [ammunition] stripper clips and brass shells from throughout Edson Range in the cement when making the monument.

=== USS Edson (DD-946) ===
USS Edson (DD-946) was a Forrest Sherman-class destroyer of the United States Navy. Edson was laid down December 3, 1956 by Bath Iron Works Corporation, Bath, Maine and launched January 4, 1958. The ship was sponsored by Mrs. M. A. Edson, widow of General Edson. It was commissioned November 7, 1958, with Commander Thomas J. Moriarty in command.

=== Edson Hall ===
Edson Hall, the location of the Communications School at Marine Corps Base Quantico in Virginia, is dedicated to Edson as a result of his role as a vocal proponent of the criticality of communications in combat.

== See also ==
- List of Medal of Honor recipients for World War II
- List of military figures by nickname
- List of people from Vermont

== Notes ==
National Rifle Association of America
Preceded by Emmett Swanson	President of the NRA; 1949–1950	Succeeded by Harry D. Linn
