= Condor Field =

Airbase in Twentynine Palms, California

Coordinates: 34.231667°N 116.061667°W

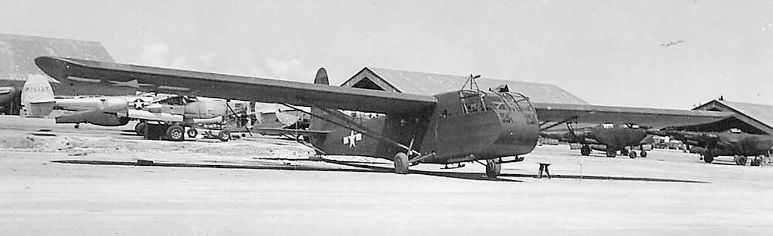
Twenty Nine Palms Air Academy with a Waco CG-4A in 1942

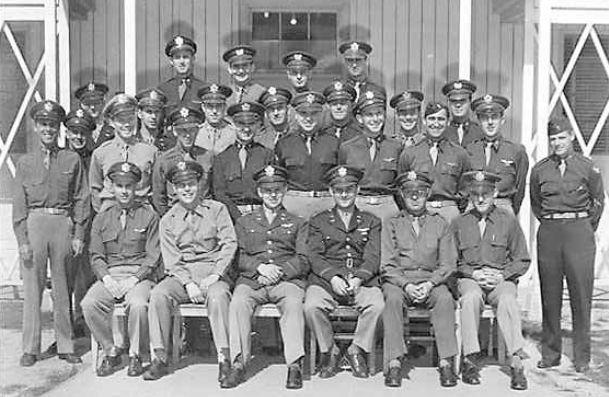
Army Air Force glider pilots at Twentynine Palms AirAcademy in July 1941

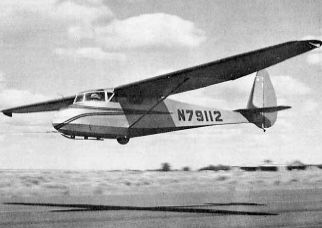
Twentynine Palms AirAcademy TG-1A glider a training glider a Frankfort Cinema with the Army designation TG-1

Condor Field was an airbase located in Twentynine Palms, California used for training both in World War II and the Korean War. From 1939 to 1942, and from 1945 to 1949, it was operated as a civil airport. The now-abandoned airfield is on the Marine Corps Air Ground Combat Center Twentynine Palms. In about 1939, a 3,000-foot runway was built at the southeast edge of dry lake Mesquite Lake as a civil field and named Twenty Nine Palms Airfield.

== History ==
The Twenty Nine Palms airfield was taken over on January 1, 1942 and renamed Condor Field for United States Army Air Forces military glider training. The army built an 1800 x 3000 foot landing mat for the training. The main use was during World War II as a US Army glider school. An additional airfield was needed, so the Twentynine Palms Airport, 6 miles east of Condor Field, was also taken over for glider training. The United States Army Air Forces Contract Flying School Airfields opened the training center, and called it the Twenty-Nine Palms Air Academy. The Academy had four auxiliary airfields in the local area. Flight training was performed with Fairchild PT-19s as the primary trainer. It also had several PT-17 Stearmans and a few P-40 Warhawks assigned. For the War, the last training was in the Waco CG-4 gliders. The Academy conducted basic flight training from March 1943 until April 1944. General Henry H. Arnold, Chief of the Army Air Forces, ordered the training for 150 glider pilots for World War II. By the end of WW2 over 6,000 glider pilots had been trained. In all 1,654 of the glider pilots were trained at the Twentynine Palms Air Academy. The site of the

Training and stationed at Condor Field:

- 17th Army Air Forces Flying Training Detachment.
- Air Depot Detachment to Twentynine Palms Air Academy, a Contract Flying.)
- Army Air Forces Weather Station, type C.
- The Civil Contract Flying School.

With Invasion of Normandy on June 6, 1944, all the glider training was complete by April 1944 and the airfield was closed. Late in 1944, the US Navy took over the airfield and renamed it Twentynine Palms Naval Auxiliary Air Station. When it was under USN control, it became an auxiliary airfield to NAS San Diego. The airfield built for glider training was not strong enough for the Navy's Lockheed Ventura and Consolidated PB4Y-2 Privateer, so the Navy built a new runway on the dry lake out of Marston Matting. After the war in October 1945, the Navy closed the Twentynine Palms Naval Auxiliary Air Station. The airfield returned as a civil airport now with a 4,000 foot paved runway.

For the Korean War, there was a need for a live-fire training range. So, in 1952, Condor Field reopened as Marine Corps Training Center Twentynine Palms and the airfield was called an expeditionary airfield. A second 6,000-foot steel-mat runway was added for jet and cargo plane use. The Lockheed C-5 Galaxy came out in December 1969, and there was a need for a longer paved runway to support large heavy planes. A new airfield was built in 1976, located 8 miles northwest of the original airfield. In 1979, Condor Field was closed as the new airfield became completely operational. The site of the old Condor Field is now located near the main entrance to the Marine Corps Air Ground Combat Center Twentynine Palms off the west side of Adobe Road.

== See also ==
- California during World War II
- Desert Training Center
