= Communications School (United States Marine Corps) =

School of the United States Marine Corps

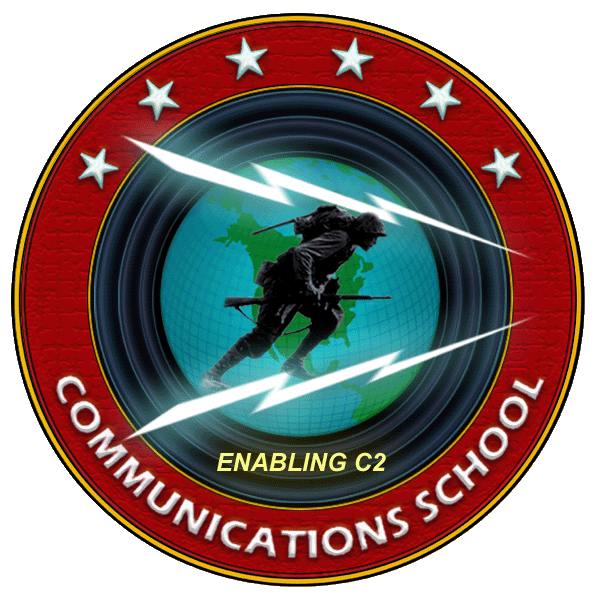
- Official Communications School Emblem; Designed by Captain Jamel Neville, USMC (2006)
- Active: 1 June 1944 - 11 March 2015
- Country: United States of America
- Branch: United States Marine Corps
- Type: Training
- Role: Train and educate selected United States Marine Corps officers in communications and command and staff duties
- Part of: Training and Education Command
- Garrison/HQ: Marine Corps Air Ground Combat Center Twentynine Palms
- Mottos: Enabling C2 (Command and Control)

Commanders
- Current commander: Lieutenant Colonel Speros C. Koumparakis(Commanding Officer)

Edson Hall, Quantico, VA

MajGen Merritt A. Edson display

Communications School (formerly known as Command and Control Systems School (CCSS)) is where selected United States Marine Corps commissioned and warrant officers are sent to learn the art and science of planning and employing communications and performing command and staff duties.

== Mission statement ==
To provide professional and technical training in the planning, designing, engineering, employment and operation of tactical communications systems in order to ensure commanders at all levels within the Marine Corps have the ability to exercise the command and control functions throughout the operational environment.

== History of Communications School ==
Closure of Communication School and the transition to the Communications Training Battalion - On 20 August 2014, Communications School graduated the last class taught in Quantico. On 28 August 2014, the last of the Communications School staff turned over the keys of Edson Hall to the G-4 of Training Command. All equipment and personnel from Communication School in Quantico completed the transition to Twentynine Palms, California on 22 September 2014. The move will signify an end of an era in Quantico. On 23 July 2014 the Communications School officially moved the headquarters and unit colors to Marine Corps Communication Electronics School aboard the Marine Corps Air Ground Combat Center. On 14 August 2014 Delta Company was established under Communications School and Delta Company assumed the previous mission of Communications School. On 12 March 2015, the Communication Training Battalion was formally activated which officially consolidated all Enlisted and Officer Communication Training for the Marine Corps under one Battalion which provides quality instruction at the basic and advanced levels for Marine enlisted and officers, as well as military personnel from other services and nations. Communication Training Battalion largely consists of two companies. Bravo Company is composed of entry-level training of the data, radio, and telephony MOS. Delta Company trained all the advance level chief training and all the Officer training.

The Communication Officers School was formerly established during the height of World War II on 1 June 1944, under the leadership of Lieutenant Colonel C. Nelson. At that time, a 26-week Communications Officer Course, which provided instruction on the newest communications techniques, procedures, and equipment, was designed to help standardize communications planning and employment throughout the Marine Corps based on lessons learned acquired through nearly three years of war. The first class, which was the forerunner to the Advanced Communications Officer Course, graduated on 18 October 1944. Eight years later, a Reserve Communications Officer Indoctrination Course was added to provide instruction to the Fleet Marine Forces Reserve.

On 2 February 1954, ground was broken for a new, $300,000 building on the edge of the Potomac in Quantico. After a year-and-a-half of construction, the building was dedicated on 12 December 1955 and named “Edson Hall” in honor of Major General Merritt A. Edson, a World War II Marine hero and leader of the famed “Edson’s Raiders” and a vocal proponent of the criticality of communications in combat. The well dated building is still is use today; despite health concerns for students and staff.

The first Communication Officers Orientation Course was convened on 25 April 1955. The four-week course was designed to give recent Basic School graduates a background in communications prior to reporting to the Fleet Marine Forces. That course, over the years, has evolved into the current Basic Communications Officer Course (BCOC), a 19-week course designed to provide initial communications skills training to company grade officers and enabling them to execute the responsibilities of a Battalion/Squadron S-6 Officer. The course stresses hands-on equipment training combined with realistic field exercises.

In 1973, the school’s advanced course lengthened to 41 weeks and additional emphasis was placed on amphibious command and control techniques. Later, in 1989, this course was changed again to the Command and Control Systems Course (CCSC) to better address technological advances in command and control systems used by commanders on today’s modern battlefield. In 2002, with the establishment of the Expeditionary Warfare School—which combined elements of both Marine Corps career-level PME curricula (the Amphibious Warfare School and CCSC)—Communications School refocused its advanced instruction through the addition of the eight-week C4 Planners Course (C4PC), designed primarily for captains and master sergeants.

In 1998, two new courses were added to the school's mission: a two-week Advanced Communications Seminar (ACS, formerly known as ACIS) to help prepare field grade 0602 officers and their Communication Chiefs for their respective duties at senior commands; and a two-week Communications Officer Refresher (COR, formerly known as CISOR) Course to provide communications refresher training and education for company grade officers. Both courses support the Total Force of active and reserve officers.

Communications School was moved to Marine Corps Air Ground Combat Center, Twentynine Palms in July and August 2014. It was reformed as the Communication Training Battalion on 11 March 2015. The mission to train officers and warrant officers was tasked to the newly formed Delta Company. The Communication Training Battalion now holds all 06XX (Communications Occupational Field) training for the Marine Corps with entry level enlisted training under its Bravo Company and SNCO and Officer training under the Delta Company.

The Communication Training Battalion continues to provide "quality" instruction at both the basic and advanced levels to selected Marine Corps communications officers and chiefs, as well as officers from other services and nations. Many graduates of this school have achieved success in a wide variety of endeavors, including U.S. Senator John Warner (R-Va.) and General Alfred M. Gray (ret), 29th Commandant of the Marine Corps.

== Organization ==
The Communications Training Battalion is led by a LtCol and consist of three companies: Bravo Company, Delta Company and Headquarters Company. The Basic Communication Officer Course is part of Delta Company. Delta Company Commander billet is held by a Major. Course Coordinator for BCOC is currently held by a Captain.

- Basic Instructor Group is responsible for the Basic Communications Officer Course
- Advance Instructor Group is responsible for the Advanced Communications Officer Course, Warrant Officer Communications Course, and Advanced Communications Seminar (a two-week class for field grade and senior enlisted marines).
- Communication Instructor Platoon (CIP) provides marines and equipment in support of schoolhouse requirements.
- Academics Section is responsible for the course development, instructional delivery, and evaluation efforts for all of courses taught at Communications School.
- Operations Section satisfies all administrative and operational requirements of the Commanding Officer, both Instructor Groups, Academics, EIP, and all enrolled students.

== Courses ==
Students planning and configuring multiplexing networks

=== Basic Communications Officer Course ===
The Basic Communications Officer Course (BCOC) provides leadership and professional training in communications and data systems in order to prepare company grade officers for entry level billets in the Operating Forces, with a concentration on the duties of the S-6. Currently, BCOC is a 20-week Program of Instruction (POI), conducted twice per year aboard Marine Corps Air Ground Combat Center in Twentynine Palms, California. The majority of the students begin BCOC following their graduation from The Basic School, and are awarded with the 0602 MOS upon successful completion of the course. Class sizes typically range from 60-80 students, and the core curriculum areas include the Marine Corps Planning Process, communications theory, single channel radio, tactical telephone switching systems, tactical data networks, servers, tactical multi-channel radio systems, and communications planning. The Basic Communication Officer Course is led by a staff of Captains and a Communication Instructor Platoon. BCOC is one of the Marine Corps' longest MOS producing schools. Prior to the name of Basic Communication Officer Course, the school was formerly known as Communications and Information Systems Officer Course (CISOC).

=== Advanced Communications Officer Course ===
Led by the Advanced Instruction Group, Advanced Communications Officer Course (ACOC) is a 10-week course which provides formal skill progression-training in technical planning to captains and majors serving in the operating forces, and other select planners. Communications Marines and sister-service communications officers attending the Expeditionary Warfare School attend ACOC as part of their Occupational Field Enhancement Curriculum.

The mission is to provide instruction on planning for the employment of common user network and subscriber terminal equipment within a Marine Air Ground Task Force as a component of a Joint Task Force (JTF) with external connectivity to Unified Combatant Commands and national level systems. This is accomplished through a curriculum built on the following modules of instruction: Planning, Communications Control, Communications Security, Information Security, Radio Network Plan, Multiplex Network Plan, Data Network Plan, Video Teleconferencing Plan, and Organizational Messaging Plan that are applied in the content of the Communications Plan (Annex K) to an Operation Order/Plan. Practical application exercises and quizzes are used throughout the curriculum; the student’s final evaluation is to write a major subordinate command (MSC) level Annex K based upon a Marine Expeditionary Force level operation order.

Communications School conducts ACOC semi-annually, and sizes range from 15 (Fall) to 40 (Spring) students. Funded class seats are available via HQMC for 0602 captains and majors, 06xx Chief Warrant Officers, and 0605 Limited Duty Officer (LDO) Captains. All nominees must participate in the seven core modules of instruction. Marine officers receive the secondary MOS of 0603 upon successful completion of the course.

=== Warrant Officer Communications Course ===
Communications School conducts three simultaneous, 6-week Warrant Officer Communications Courses for W01 MOS 0610, 0620, 0650 students following their graduation from The Basic School. Also led by the Advance Instruction Group, these warrant officer courses are focused on technical planning training and education in each functional area. Thirty class seats are available on a first-come, first-served basis to C4 (MOS 0610, 0620, 0650) Warrant Officers (WO1-CWO5) serving in the operational forces, reserve component, and supporting establishment.

=== Advanced Communications Seminar ===
The Advanced Communications Seminar (ACS) is a Total Force formal training program for senior officers (CWO2 through CWO5 and Capt through Col) with the MOS 0602. The mission of ACS is to provide current and necessary information to optimize the effectiveness of officers in G-6/J-6 billets at the Marine Expeditionary Force (MEF), Component, Theater, or supporting establishment level. This is accomplished through presentations on joint operational and strategic communications, Marine Corps C4 planning/management and information technology updates. ACS is two-weeks in length and conducted annually in the spring with a maximum capacity of 50 students.

== See also ==
- Marine Corps Communication Electronics School
- United States Marine Corps Training and Education Command (TECOM)
- The Basic School
