= Edson Range =

US Marine corps firing range

Coordinates: 33°15′50″N 117°25′5″W

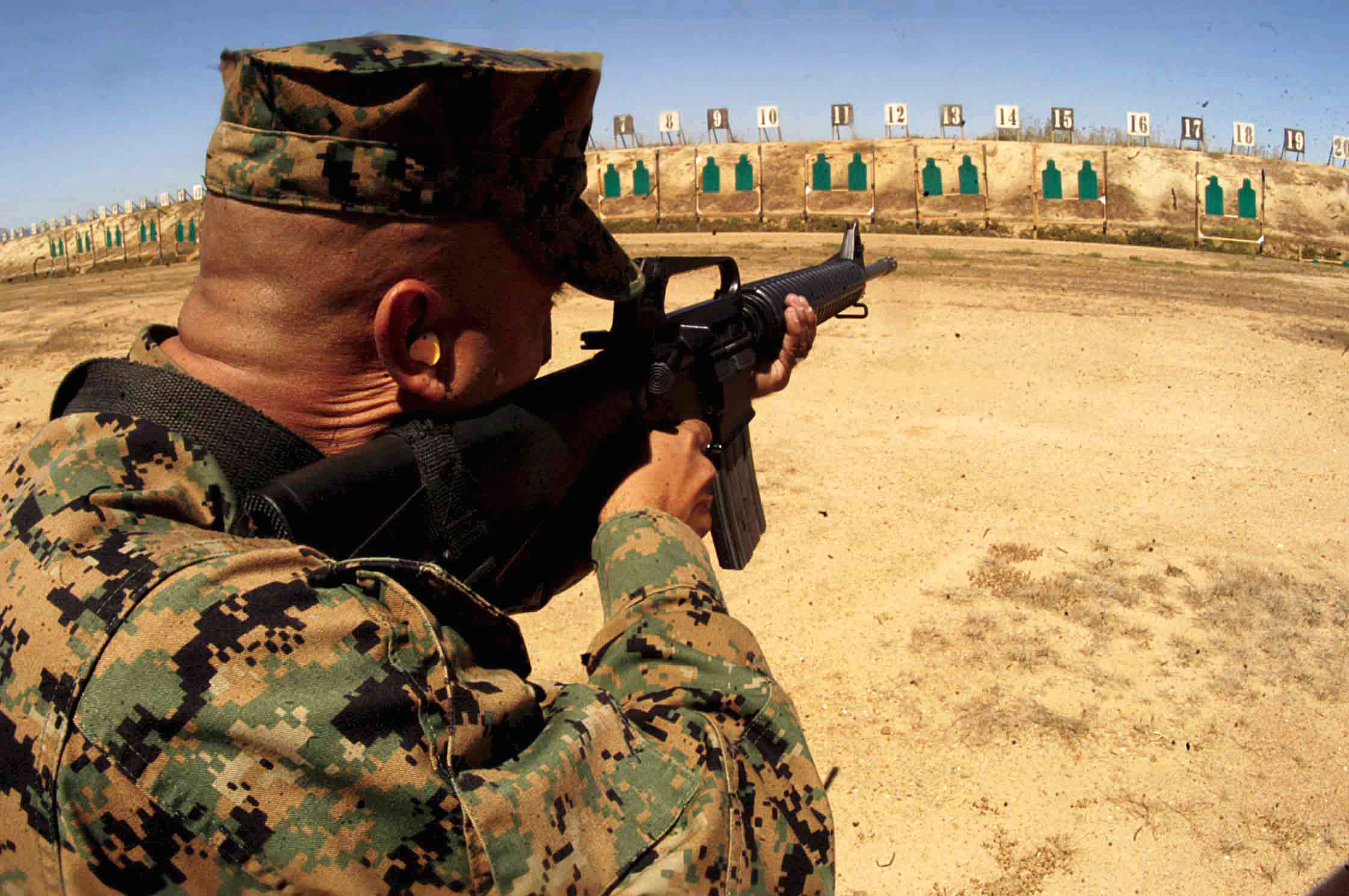
Marine takes aim at Edson Range

Edson Range is a firing range complex at Marine Corps Base Camp Pendleton, near Oceanside, California. It is named for Marine Major General "Red Mike" Edson, "a World War II Medal of Honor recipient and a distinguished small arms marksman proponent." This rifle-qualification complex is home to four of the largest firing ranges on the base. The range became operational on August 21, 1964, the same day that Camp Calvin B. Matthews, in La Jolla, California, was closed and turned over to the University of California. Camp Matthews had previously been used for rifle training.

While located at Camp Pendleton, Edson Range is organized as an annex of Marine Corps Recruit Depot San Diego and serves as the rifle qualification range where Marine recruits receive field and rifle training during boot camp. Two weeks of marksmanship training followed by one week of infantry field skills take place at Edson Range, which is known as "up north" by recruits and drill instructors alike (the Recruit Depot in San Diego being "down south"). The Crucible, a three to four day combat simulation with little food or sleep, also takes place here.

Edson Range is also home to the "Swift Intruders", the U.S. Navy's Assault Craft Unit 5 who operate the Landing Craft Air Cushion (LCAC), and train on the Edson Range beaches and the adjacent Pacific Ocean. Bravo range is famous for being the range Lee Harvey Oswald shot on when he was a Marine.

== Recruit live fire training ==
Marine recruits undertake two different courses of fire while learning how to use the M16 rifle. During their first week of weapons training (known as Grass Week), recruits learn in a classroom setting with instruction coming from a PMI (Primary Marksmanship Instructor). On the second week (known as Firing Week), recruits will go to one of the three KD (known distance) ranges to fire Table 1A, their first course of fire. The three live fire ranges aboard Edson Range where Table 1 is fired are the "world famous" Bravo Range, Charlie Range, and Delta Range. The week after qualifying on Table 1 is spent on Alpha Range where the recruits will fire Table 2, which is the introduction to the Marine Corps' Combat Marksmanship Program.

== See also ==
- Camp Calvin B. Matthews
- List of United States Marine Corps installations
- Lee Harvey Oswald
