= Marine Corps Tactics and Operations Group =

Support command of the U.S. Marine Corps

Marine Corps Tactics and Operations Group (MCTOG)
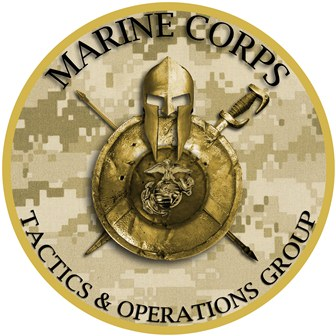
- Country: United States
- Branch: United States Marine Corps
- Type: Supporting Command
- Role: Training and Education
- Part of: Training and Education Command
- Garrison/HQ: MCAGCC

The Marine Corps Tactics and Operations Group (MCTOG) provides advanced and standardized training in Marine Air-Ground Task Force (MAGTF) Operations, Combined Arms Training and Unit Readiness Planning at the Battalion and Regiment levels, and synchronizes doctrine and training standards IOT enhance combat preparation and performance of Ground Combat Element (GCE) units in MAGTF operations. They fall under the command of the Training and Education Command. It was established by General James T. Conway, Commandant of the Marine Corps.

== History ==
The first TMIC (Tactical MAGTF Integration Course), then called OTIC (Operations and Tactics Instructor Course), commenced in February 2008.

== Programs ==
Tactical MAGTF Integration Course (TMIC) - produces Operations Tactics Instructors (OTI)

The six-week course begins with two weeks of academics where students learn how to more effectively manage battle staffs in the fields of intelligence, counterinsurgency operations, and amphibious operations, joint and interagency integration, and campaign planning. The goal is to increase proficiency in command and control, and the processes, systems and procedures of command and control. TMIC also features simulation exercises designed to put the Marines’ newly acquired skills to the test.

== See also ==
- United States Marine Corps Training and Education Command
