= Marine Corps Communication Electronics School =

Marine Corps Communications-Electronics School
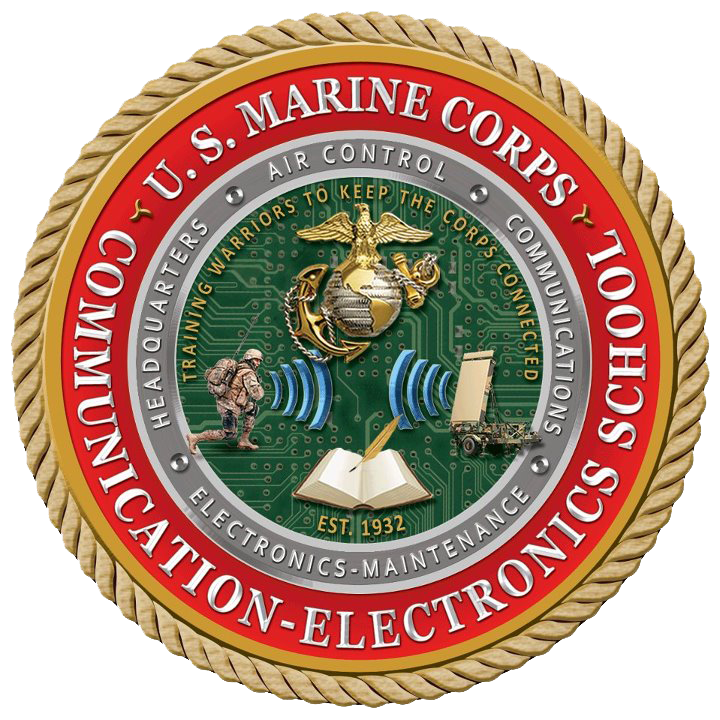
- Logo of the Marine Corps Communications-Electronics School
- Active: 1932 - Present
- Country: United States
- Allegiance: United States of America
- Branch: United States Marine Corps
- Type: School
- Part of: TRNGCMD
- Garrison/HQ: Marine Corps Air Ground Combat Center Twentynine Palms
- Motto: "We Train C4 Warriors"
- Decorations: American Campaign Streamer; World War II Victory Streamer (4) National Defense Service Streamer (4) Meritorious Unit Commendation; Global War on Terrorism Service Streamer

Commanders
- Current commander: Colonel Atiim O Phillips

Marine Corps Communication-Electronics School (MCCES) is the Marine Corps training ground for the majority of the communications and air/ground electronic maintenance Military Occupational Specialties (MOS). MCCES is based at the Marine Corps Air Ground Combat Center Twentynine Palms, California.

== Mission ==
To train Marines in ground electronics maintenance, tactical communications, and air control/anti-air warfare operations and maintenance in order to ensure commanders at all levels within the Marine Corps have the ability to exercise command and control throughout the operational environment; and to participate in technical and logistical evaluations for new communication, electronic maintenance, air control, and anti-air warfare systems in support of fielding and training.

Tasks

1. Conduct formal, MOS qualification and sentiment training in Communication-Electronics Maintenance, Operational Communications, Air Control and Anti-Air Warfare Operations
2. Act as C4 Training and Education Center of Excellence in order to coordinate solutions to training requirements for the C4 occupational fields.
3. Participate in technical and logistical evaluations of new communications, electronic maintenance, Air Control and Anti-Air Warfare systems in order to develop formal training to support the fielding of these systems throughout the Marine Corps.

== History ==
=== Beginnings ===
MCCES began as the Pigeon and Flag Handler Platoon in 1932. On October 5, 1942, it was activated as the Signal School under the Signal Battalion in Quantico, VA. In 1943 they moved to Camp Lejeune, NC; remained there until the end of WWII and eventually offered 15 courses in the communications field. In August 1946, the school was relocated to Camp Del Mar on Camp Pendleton, CA. In December 1949, Signal School was re-designated as Signal and Tracked Vehicle School Battalion. In 1950, coinciding with the Korean War, the school was moved to MCRD San Diego, CA and was renamed to Signal School Battalion in September. During this time, the school added technician and repairmen training. In 1953, the school was re designated to Communication-Electronics School Battalion.

=== Modern Day ===
In 1963 the school began to move to Marine Corps Base, Twentynine Palms, CA with the move of C and E Companies. In February 1971 the school was redesignated to its current title of Marine Corps Communication-Electronics School and A and D Companies moved to Twentynine Palms at this time. Also during this time an Officer Training course was developed for Air Defense Officer and the school trained over 5000 Marines Annually. In 1975, B Company moved from Camp Pendleton, completing the move of the school and establishing the largest formal school in the Marine Corps. In 2002 the MOS redesignation of Data Systems Marines from the 40 occupational fields into the 06 occupational field was completed. In 2003 D Company merged into B Company then D Company was dissolved. In 2005 The average student population was 1,240. The School conducts 44 separate courses producing 37 MOS's. 303 classes are scheduled annually varying from 2 to 54 weeks in duration. This represents upwards of 25,000 academic days. MCCES graduates nearly 6,500 personnel annually. C&E (our local/colloquial term) has played a vital role in the Corps' combat- readiness; recognized as such in the form of unit awards to include; American Campaign Streamer, World War II Victory Streamer, National Defense Service Streamer w/3 Bronze Stars, Meritorious Unit Commendation w/3 Bronze Stars, Global War on Terrorism Service Streamer. MCCES currently consist of a Headquarters Company and 3 training companies/schools which are: Company A/CEMS (Communication-Electronics Maintenance School, Company B/TCTS (Tactical Communications Training School), Company C/Air School). 2006 The onboard average student population was 1042. The School conducted 56 separate courses producing 35 MOS's. 51 of these courses were conducted at the Formal Learning Center (FLC) and 5 by Mobile Training Teams. 2011 In August the Commanding Officer of MCCES officially became the reporting senior for; CO, Communication School, MCB, Quantico, Virginia; CO, Marine Detachment Fort Gordon, Georgia; CO, Low Altitude Air Defense School, Fort Bliss, Texas and Marine Corps Representative, Sheppard AFB, Texas. MCCES continues to carry out its primary mission to train personnel in the fields of operational communications, communications-electronics maintenance, and air control/anti-air warfare operations. On 5 April 2013 Air Control Training Squadron (ACTS) was activated under MCCES. The former Charlie Company has been redesignated as Detachment Bravo and the former Alpha Company has been designated as Detachment Alpha under the Air Control Training Squadron which is reportable to the Commanding Officer, MCCES.

== Schools ==
=== Communication Electronics Maintenance School (ACTS-Company A) ===
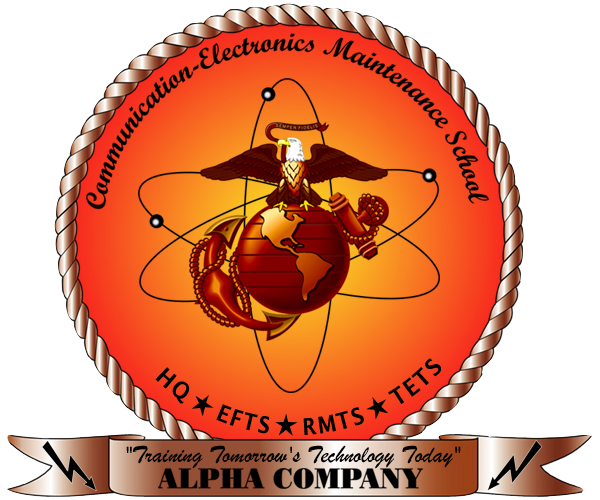
Alpha Company Logo

The Communication-Electronics Maintenance School (CEMS) is responsible for training the 2800 MOS field.

==== Radio Maintenance Training Section (RMTS) ====
===== Ground Radio Repair Course (GRRC) =====
The Ground Radio Repair Course teaches analysis, troubleshooting, maintenance, restoration, and repair of ground transmission systems line-replaceable units to the shop replaceable unit and chassis-mounted component-level to entry-level Marines.

===== Digital Wideband Repair Course (DWRC) =====
The Digital Wideband Repair Course teaches principles of digital and microwave communications, multi-channel transmission principles, FM transceivers, satellite communications theory, and component level troubleshooting to entry-level Marines.

===== Tactical Remote Sensor System Maintenance Course (TRSSMC) =====
The Tactical Remote Sensor System Maintenance Course teaches installation, testing, circuit analysis, and troubleshooting of the Tactical Remote Sensor System to Marines who already have a required Military Occupational Specialty

==== Electronic Fundamentals Training Section (EFTS) ====
===== Basic Electronics Course =====
The Basic Electronics Course teaches basic electricity, electronics, digital logic, computer operation, circuit principles, troubleshooting, and soldering. It prepares entry-level Marines to attend follow-on electronic equipment repair courses specific to their MOS (Military Occupational Specialty).

===== Advanced Electronics Course =====
The Advanced Electronics Course teaches advanced electronics and circuit theory, circuit simulation and analysis, and advanced logical troubleshooting. It prepares career-level Marines to attend a follow-on advanced electronic equipment repair course.

===== Miniature/Microminiature/Automated Test Equipment Repair Course (MM/ATEC) =====
The Micro-Miniature Automated Test Equipment Course teaches entry-level and Fleet Marines to use automated test equipment to isolate faults on circuit card assemblies, develop test routines for various circuit card assemblies, and then repair them using advanced soldering techniques including miniature and microminiature surface mount, plated-through hole, and wire termination techniques and fundamentals. The "2M" Technicians produced in this course will also have the ability to repair, reconstruct, and resurface laminates and other various surface types that are used in circuit cards.

==== Terminal Equipment Training Section (TETS) ====
===== Telephone Systems / Personal Computer Repair Course (TSPCRC) =====
The Telephone Systems/Personal Computer Repair Course provides instruction on circuit theory and analysis, the operation, troubleshooting, modification, restoration, and maintenance of Telecommunications Systems, IT Networking Systems, Personal Computers and peripheral devices, as well as Fiber Optic cables and systems to entry-level Marines. Marines completing this course earn the military occupational specialty of 2847 (Ground Electronics Telecommunications and Information Technology Systems Maintainer).

===== Technical Controller Course (TCC) =====
The Technical Control Course teaches theory of telecommunication networks, planning, installation, integration, operation, troubleshooting, and restoration of communication networks to entry-level Marines a Digital Technical Control Facility.

===== Electronics Maintenance Technicians Course (EMTC) =====
The Electronics Maintenance Technicians Course provides career progression training for SNCO's and NCO's in the 28XX field on performing complex diagnosis, field level repairs, and modifications to ground electronics communications systems, as well as the supervision of maintenance activities, coordination of equipment evacuation for repair, requisitioning of parts, and monitoring of maintenance production.

===== Electronics Maintenance Supervisors Course (EMSC) =====
The Electronics Maintenance Supervisors Course is career progression training for Master Sergeants in the 28XX field and for Warrant Officer 1's seeking to become 2805's. EMTC provides instruction on the development of policies and procedures for ground electronics systems maintainers to perform inspection and classification; servicing, adjustment, and tuning; repair; modification; recovery and evacuation; overhauling and rebuilding; testing and calibration of Ground Electronics Systems Equipment and miscellaneous electronics systems used by Marine Corps Ground Forces.

=== Tactical Communications Training School (Company B) ===
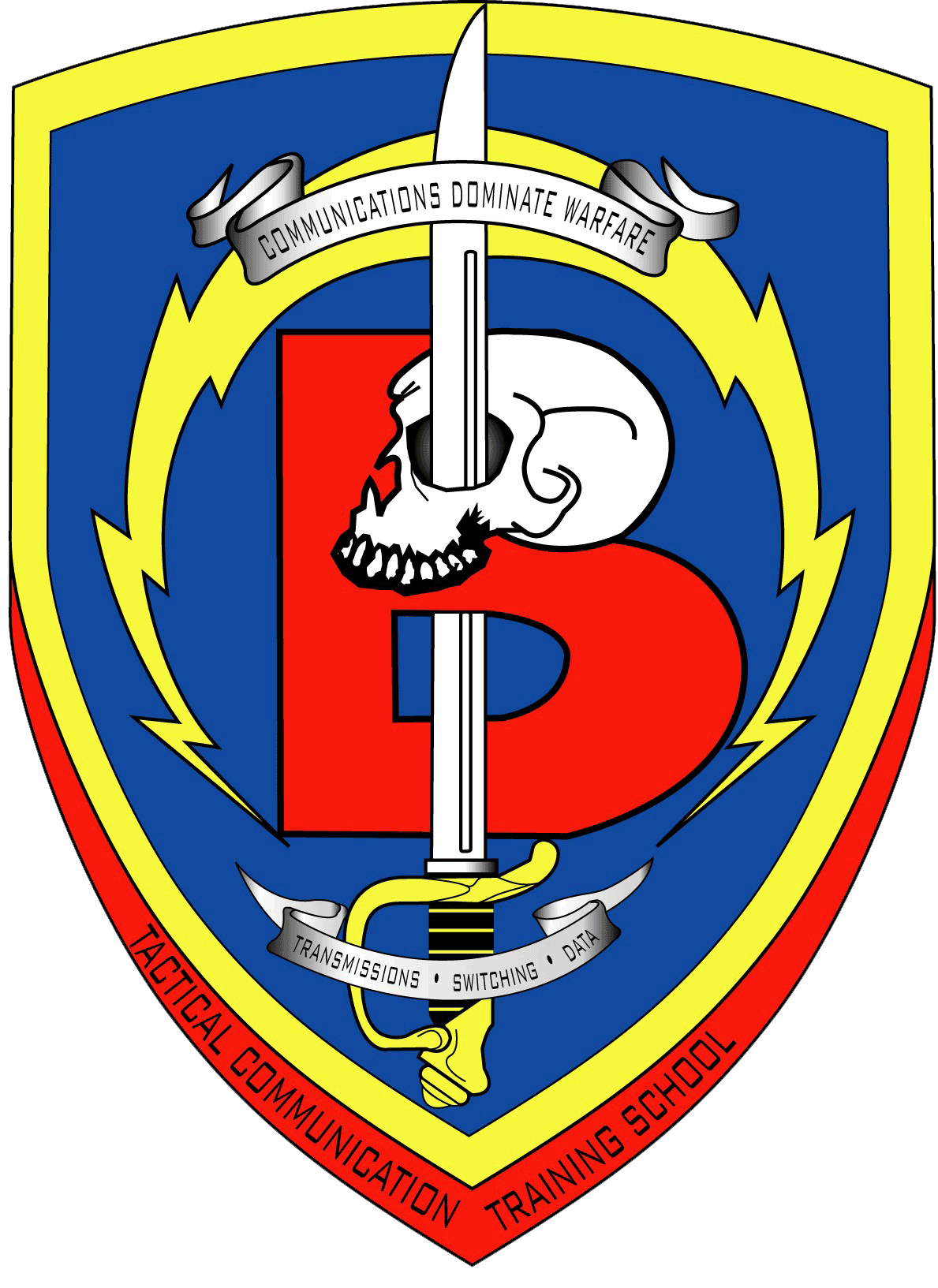
BravoCompany Logo

TCTS is responsible for training communications systems operators. TCTS trains Marines in the 06xx MOS field such as 0621 Field Radio Operators, 0631 Network Administrators, etc.

==== Data Training Platoon (DTP) ====
To train Marines to support the Marine Corps mission to install, operate, maintain, and secure cyber network systems including computer hardware and software.

==== Switching Training Section (STS) ====
The section provides instruction on installation, operation, and maintenance on command and control switching systems that provide classified and unclassified voice communication. During this course the students will be taught basic installation and maintenance.

==== Transmission Training Platoon (TTP) ====
To provide instruction for the installation and operation of various tactical FMF radio equipment.

=== Air Control Training Squadron (ACTS) ===
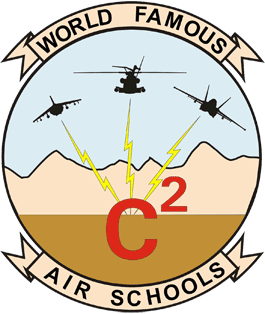
Charlie Company Logo

AIRS trains Marines in the 5900 and 7200 MOS fields.

==== Air Command and Control Training Section (AC2TS) ====
AC2TS focuses on net/radio operator training and info/data flow throughout the Marine Air Command and Control System (MACCS) related to offensive air support and assault support and medical evacuation operations by performing as operators for information flow and controllers of fixed and rotary wing aircraft. The mission is to train operations operators and control officers to a certain military occupational specialty (MOS). Their task being to safely and efficiently receive and pass on request from friendly forces and delegate the airspace as efficiently as possible to provide close air support as part of their operations center the Direct Air Support Center (DASC) works with a procedural control system. Readiness percentage and end-state is to provide Direct Air Support Center (DASC) Marines to the Fleet Marine Forces (FMF). Operator MOS's are identified by the numbers 7200. Air support operator Marines have the MOS of 7242.

==== Air Defense Training Section (ADTS) ====
ADTS focuses on Anti-Air Warfare operations as well as fundamental Tactical Air Operations Center (TAOC) operations. Air defense operator Marines have the MOS of 7234 and 7236. Air Defense Officers have the MOS of 7210.

==== Low Altitude Air Defense Training (LAAD) Section ====
The LAAD Training Sections focuses on the employment of the Stinger Missile. LAAD Marines hold the MOS 7212 and 7204

==== Radar Maintenance Training Section (RDRMTS) ====
This course instructs current radar repairman in the advance fundamental concepts of radar theory and the foundational building blocks of radars in preparation for advanced training in ground or aviation radar systems. Radar repairmen hold the MOS 5948.

==== Tactical Data Systems Training Section (TDSTS) ====
TDSTS is built of three main MOS producing courses; Aviation Communications Systems Technician Course (5939), Tactical Data Systems Administrators Course (5974), and Air Defense Systems Technician Course (ADSTU - 5979). Each course trains entry-level Marines that recently graduated from the 5900 Commons Course.

== Unit awards ==
A unit citation or commendation is an award bestowed upon an organization for the action cited. Members of the unit who participated in said actions are allowed to wear on their uniforms the awarded unit citation. The unit is authorized to fly the appropriate streamer on its organizational flag. The Marine Corps Communications-Electronics School has been presented with the following awards:

Streamer	Award
	Meritorious Unit Commendation Streamer with three Bronze Stars
	World War II Victory Streamer
	National Defense Service Streamer with three Bronze Stars
	Global War on Terrorism Service Streamer
	American Campaign Streamer

== See also ==
- Quantico, VA
- Marine Corps Air Ground Combat Center Twentynine Palms
- 06xx MOS Field
- 28xx MOS Field
- 59xx MOS Field
- 72xx MOS Field
