= Ana Gonçalves (disambiguation) =

Ana Gonçalves is a basketball player.

Ana Gonçalves may also refer to:

- Ana Gonçalves (futsal) (born 2000)
- Ana Maria Gonçalves, Brazilian writer

== See also ==
- Ana González (disambiguation)
