= Ana María González =

Ana María González may refer to:

- Ana María González (Mexican singer) (1918–1983), Mexican singer and voice actress
- Ana María González (Spanish singer) (born 1951), Spanish-Argentine soprano
- Ana María González (swimmer) (born 1974), Cuban Olympic swimmer
