= Ana María González (Spanish singer) =

Spanish lyric soprano

- Born: 13 April 1951 (age 74); Oviedo, Spain
- Occupation(s): Soprano, conservatory professor
- Spouse: Enrique Ricci
- Awards: Konex Award (1989)
- Website: www.anamariagonzalez.net

Ana María González (born 13 April 1951) is a Spanish lyric soprano trained in Argentina, known for performing at the Teatro Colón from 1973 to 1994. Although associated with the Italian lyric repertoire, she also excelled in lyric soprano roles of the French repertoire such as Manon, Marguerite, and Juliette, which brought her international fame.

== Biography ==
Ana María González was two years old when she emigrated with her family to Mendoza, Argentina, where she began studying piano and singing with Franca Cavalieri, debuting on Radio Libertador de Mendoza at an early age. At age 17 she settled in Buenos Aires, where she perfected her skills at the Teatro Colón Higher Institute of Art, studying with the eminent Argentine soprano Hina Spani. She won the Gold Medal of the Fondo Nacional de las Artes.

González debuted at the Teatro Colón in 1973 as El niño in Ravel's L'enfant et les sortilèges, followed by El retablo de maese Pedro, Gretel in Hansel and Gretel, and Micaela in Carmen (with Régine Crespin in the title role) in 1976. She continued to appear at the Buenos Aires venue in roles such as Susanna, Gilda, Nannetta, Adina, Pamina, and Euridice (with Margarita Zimmermann as Orfeo).

Later she assumed a repertoire of greater lyrical scope that included Mimi and Musetta in La bohème by Giacomo Puccini, as well as Magda (La rondine) and Liù (Turandot) by the same composer, Marguerite in Faust by Gounod (in the staging by Sergio Renán), the title role in Massenet's Manon, Anne Trulove in Stravinsky's The Rake's Progress, and Juliette in Gounod's Roméo et Juliette (directed by Cecilio Madanes in the 1977 season and revived in the 1980s).

In 1980 she was recognized as the best Argentine soprano of the season by the Asociación Verdiana Argentina.

She returned to the theater in Buenos Aires in 1993 and played Antonia in The Tales of Hoffmann together with Canarian tenor Alfredo Kraus.

Her international debut in Avignon in Roméo et Juliette was followed by Mimi in La bohème at Covent Garden, La Traviata at the Vienna State Opera and in Hamburg, Deutsche Oper am Rhein in Düsseldorf and Duisburg, the Paris Opera with Roméo et Juliette (again with Alfredo Kraus), Bordeaux, Teatro Regio di Parma (as Donna Elvira in Don Giovanni with Renato Bruson and Faust with Kraus), Modena (The Tales of Hoffmann), Palermo (La bohème), as well as performances in Mexico, Puerto Rico, Venezuela, Peru, Chile (La rondine), and Uruguay (Don Carlo and Turandot).

Other roles included Elisabetta in Don Carlo, Amelia in Simon Boccanegra, Nedda in Pagliacci, and Alice Ford in Falstaff.

In Spain she performed at the Gran Teatre del Liceu in Barcelona (Roméo et Juliette, Manon, Pagliacci with Piero Cappuccilli), at the Palau de la Música (Goyescas), in Madrid at the Teatro de la Zarzuela (Roméo et Juliette, The Tales of Hoffmann, Don Giovanni, and Marina), at the Teatro de la Maestranza in Seville, Granada, Malaga, the Cuenca Festival, in Oviedo (Marina, Simon Boccanegra, L'elisir d'amore, and Faust), in A Coruña (La traviata and Liù in Turandot), in Santiago de Compostela, and in the opera festivals of Las Palmas and Tenerife.

Other appearances included Thaïs for the Massenet Festival of Saint-Étienne and the Opéra comique of Paris, Warsaw, Rotterdam, recitals with Giacomo Aragall, José Carreras, Giuseppe Giacomini, and zarzuela recitals with Alfredo Kraus in 1987.

González dedicated herself to teaching as a professor at the Conservatori Superior de Música del Liceu in Barcelona and was invited to the centenary functions of the Teatro Colón in 2008.

She was awarded the Gold Badge of the City of Oviedo as Illustrious Citizen, and the Konex Award as one of the five best singers in the history of Argentina in 1989.

She is married to Argentine director and pianist Enrique Ricci.

== Discography ==
- Bach, Notebook for Anna Magdalena Bach. Coro Bach, Antonio Russo, Ana María González, Mario Videla – organ, QI-4076.
- Gounod, Faust. Alfredo Kraus, Nicola Ghiuselev, Teatro Regio di Parma/Alain Guingal.
- Puccini, Turandot. Adelaida Negri, José Azocar, Ana María González, Erwin Schrott, SODRE of Montevideo - Symphony Orchestra of São Paulo, Enrique Ricci.
- Recital of songs by Stradella, Cesti, Granados, Turina, Guastavino, Richard Strauss, Mahler, Wolf. Enrique Ricci, piano. 1975 vinyl LP - EMI Discos Angel 8109
- Música de la Catedral de Lima. Works by Pedro Durán, Manuel Gaytán y Arteaga, José de Orejón y Aparicio, Estacio Lacerna, Fabián García Pacheco, Joseph de Torres y Martínez Bravo. Coro de la Fundación Ars Musicalis. Jesús Gabriel Segade.
- Royal Concerts Serie, Recital with Jaume Aragall. RTVE, DVD.
