= Camp Calvin B. Matthews =

Former US Marine Corps base in San Diego, California

Coordinates: 32°52′33″N 117°13′41″W

- San Diego, California, U.S.

Site information
- Type: Military base
- Controlled by: United States Marine Corps

Site history
- Built: 1917
- In use: 1918 – 1964

Location in the United States
Location in California

Camp Calvin B. Matthews or Marine Corps Rifle Range Camp Matthews or Marine Corps Rifle Range, La Jolla (prior to World War II) or more simply Camp Matthews was a United States Marine Corps military base from 1917 until 1964, when the base was decommissioned and transferred to the University of California to be part of the new University of California, San Diego campus. Over a million Marine recruits as well as other shooters (such as Marines stationed at Miramar) received their marksmanship training at this military base.

== Location and boundaries ==
Camp Matthews was located in La Jolla in San Diego, California. The base's eastern boundary was present-day Regents Road. Its northern boundary was present-day Voigt Drive (formerly Old Miramar Road) and Matthews Lane and extended westward to Gilman Drive (formerly Coast Highway), which was its western boundary. The base's southern boundary was near present-day La Jolla Village Drive and a "panhandle" extended southward along what is today Interstate 5 and extended past present-day Nobel Drive. United States Army base Camp Callan was to the west of Camp Matthews. The Marine base at Miramar was about 3 miles (4.8 km) east of Camp Matthews.

== History ==
=== Early years ===
The Marine Corps leased 363 acres (1.47 km^{2}) of land from the City of San Diego in 1917 for use as a marksmanship training facility for Marine recruits being trained at Marine Corps Recruit Depot San Diego. However, a permanent detachment of Marines was not stationed at this base until 1923. It was first used as a rifle range in late 1918. The Marines built the first eight targets of "A" range themselves with picks and shovels. In 1925 five more targets were added. The first headquarters buildings were built in 1927 and the first detachment barracks were built in 1928. During the 1930s and 1940s, more buildings and barracks were constructed as well more firing ranges. During these years, the base had no official name but was called Marine Rifle Range, La Jolla. In 1937, the U.S. government terminated the lease and acquired 544 acres (2.20 km^{2}) in fee from the City of San Diego. This acquisition consisted of the formerly leased area as well as additional land to the east. The government also leased an additional 29.75 acres (120,400 m^{2}) from the City of San Diego. This newly leased area was in the northeastern corner of the base. The total area of the base was then 573.75 acres (2.3 km^{2}). Except for a few ranch houses, all of the area acquired was undeveloped at the time of acquisition.

=== World War II, Korean War and Early Vietnam Era years ===
After the attack on Pearl Harbor and the entry of the United States into World War II, the base was busier than ever. At the peak of the base's activity in 1944, it put 9,000 recruits through marksmanship training every three weeks, because MCRD was never suitable for this. Marine recruits from MCRD San Diego, completed their marksmanship training at Camp Matthews and marched from the camp back to the Recruit Depot with an over-night bivouac sleeping in shelter-half tents (pup-tents) . During these years, there were 700 permanent personnel stationed at the base. However, by the mid-1950s only 120 Marines were stationed at Camp Matthews. During World War II and the Korean War, more administrative buildings as well as street and utility systems were built. Most recruits lived in 6-man tents during their stay at the range.

In 1960, part of the movie "The Outsider", a film about WW II Marine IRA Hayes, was filmed at Camp Matthews because recruits were being housed in WW II Style hard-back tents. Some Marine recruits served as extras in that filming.

The camp was known as the Marine rifle range, without a formal name until WWII. The base was officially named Camp Calvin B. Matthews on March 23, 1942. It was named after Brigadier General Calvin B. Matthews, a Marine marksman of the 1930s.

In December 1945 an ammunition truck caught fire near Camp Matthews and blew up causing a large crater near highway 101.

=== Closing and transfer ===
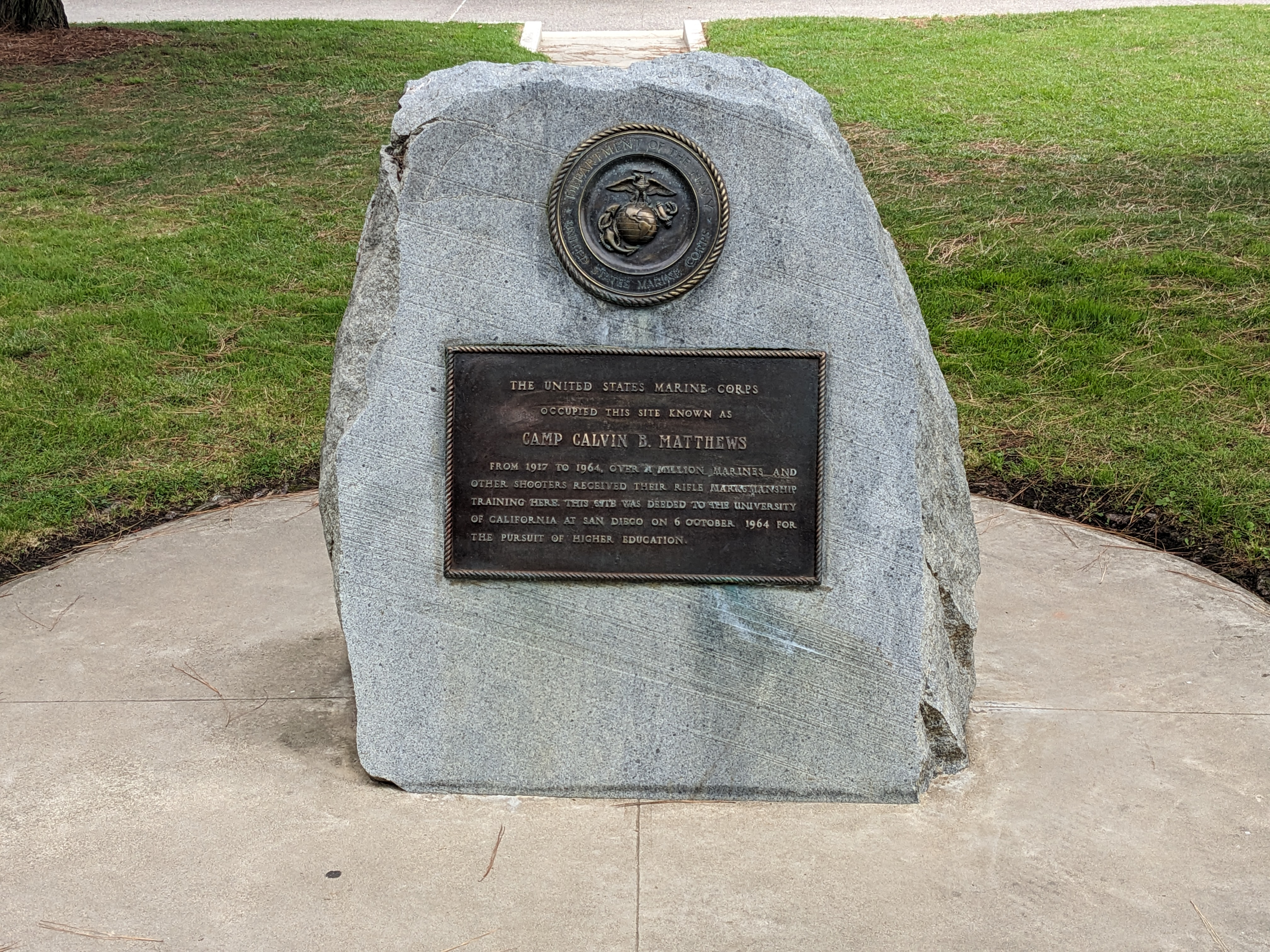
A plaque on the UC San Diego campus commemorating Camp Matthews

As the community of La Jolla expanded after World War II, local people became more and more concerned over the close proximity of a military rifle range facility in their neighborhood. The La Jolla Town Council began trying to get the United States Navy to close Camp Matthews in 1956 but the Navy resisted. In 1959, Congressman Bob Wilson introduced a bill in Congress that would transfer Camp Matthews to the University of California for the planned San Diego campus. In 1962, Camp Matthews was determined to be surplus by the Marine Corps. In May 1963, one of the 65 target ranges could no longer be used because of the safety hazard it posed to the encroaching civilian population. The base finally closed in 1964, the same year the first undergraduate class entered Revelle College, UCSD's first undergraduate college. Closing ceremonies took place on August 21, 1964, but the base was not officially closed until October 6, 1964. A monument to the camp was unveiled at this ceremony. Major General B. A. Hochmuth, the Commanding General of MCRD at the time, fired the ceremonial "last rounds" before the camp closed. The Navy conveyed titles and interest in 544 acres (2.2 km^{2}) and improvements to the Regents of the University of California on September 23 of this year. The lease on the 29.75 acres (120,400 m^{2}) with the City of San Diego was terminated in this year as well. The University of California began developing the base property for use as a campus the following year. After Camp Matthews closed, Marine marksmanship training was conducted further north at Edson Range in Camp Pendleton and continues to be conducted there up to the present day.

As late as 1980, the name "Matthews Campus" was still being used to denote this central area of UCSD where the bookstore, the campus cashier's office, and some other University offices were located.

== Facilities ==
Camp Matthews contained at least fifteen different shooting ranges as well as various buildings and other infrastructure during its existence. The shooting facilities included:

- 6 rifle ranges
- 1 pistol range
- 1 mortar/flame thrower/hand grenade court/bazooka range (Range H)
- 3 small bore ranges
- 1 skeet range
- 3 school ranges (non-shooting practice ranges)

The base had a number of buildings as well. It had 7 barracks, approximately 270 tents, administration buildings, quartermaster storerooms, magazines, an armory, maintenance shops, a dispensary, a service station, and a main post exchange. Only a few of the original Marine Corps buildings still exist. They are primarily located along Myers Drive in the central part of the present-day campus and were used for administrative buildings, the campus bookstore, as well as other uses over the years. This central location of the UC San Diego campus was called the Matthews Campus but is now called University Center and Pepper Canyon, a few locations on campus are named after Camp Matthews. They include Matthews Lane (which is part of the northern boundary of the former base) and Matthews Quad, an area in the center of the UC San Diego campus bound by Myers Drive, Lyman Walk, Russell Lane, and Rupertus Way. The original flagpole from the base still stands on a grass island in the middle of Myers Drive. A monument commemorating the former base stands there as well as a fountain designed by Michael Asher which is part of the Stuart Collection. The rear entrance sentry booth still stands near the UC San Diego Health, La Jolla parking lot. Drawings and graffiti left by Marine recruits still decorate the interior of the sentry booth and are now protected by plexiglas. Another surviving Camp Matthews building is the Ché Café.

=== Current land use ===
The area Camp Matthews used to occupy has been divided-up for various uses. During the 1960s, UCSD disposed of former Camp Matthews land in the following way:

- 84.7 acres (343,000 m^{2}) went to the California Department of Transportation for the construction of the San Diego Freeway (Interstate 5).
- 26 acres (110,000 m^{2}) were conveyed the Veterans Administration for the construction of the VA San Diego Medical Center.
- Approximately 39 acres (160,000 m^{2}) were transferred to private parties for commercial and residential development. This land included areas now occupied by the La Jolla Village Square shopping center and the Mormon temple across Interstate 5 from it and also the Sheraton La Jolla Hotel.

The rest of the land currently belongs to UC San Diego and much of the current campus is built on this land. The 29.75 acres (120,400 m^{2}) that the City of San Diego previously leased to the military are now leased to UC San Diego.

== Safety and environmental effects ==
During the decommissioning of the camp, the government decontaminated Range H, the grenade/mortar/bazooka range, which was located in a ravine in the “panhandle” area of the base near the present-day I-5. In the early 1960s, a mining company salvaged lead and brass from the Camp Matthews ranges. However, over the years ammunition and even rockets from the former base have turned up during construction on the site. In April 1999, approximately 200 3.5-inch (89 mm) practice rockets were discovered in a hillside immediately below the Radisson Hotel La Jolla (which is currently the Sheraton Hotel La Jolla ). This area is 1,000 feet (300 m) from the Range H area of the former base and is now on the east side of I-5. They were found due to a parking lot expansion project involving the removal of part of a hillside (this hillside is now landscaped). There was no charge in any of the rockets and all the propellant was gone. The hotel hired a private company to survey the area for more ordnance with metal detectors but found none. In February 2003, approximately 40 practice rockets were found at two construction sites on the former base. One 3.5-inch (89 mm) rocket was found in the medical complex area of the campus during this year. In 2005, during the construction of student housing units, the following was found: 14 inert rockets (8 2.3–inch M7 series practice rockets and 6 3.5-inch (89 mm) M29 series practice rockets), fragments from 60 mm mortars, M9 rifle grenades, Mk II hand grenades, and 3.5-inch (89 mm) M29 series practice rockets. Small arms projectiles (.30-caliber and .45-caliber) have been found north of the UCSD Jacobs Medical Center complex. They were corroded and missing their outer coverings. They were possibly World War I or World War II era munitions.

Over the years, the government has investigated the former Camp Matthews site due to concern over the previous use of the base. The first government inspection of the site took place in 1988 due to an inquiry from a construction contractor regarding the likelihood of finding ordnance and explosives (OE) during construction on a site on a part of the former base east of I-5. The next inspection took place in 1999 when the Defense Environmental Restoration Program – Formerly Used Defense Sites (DERP-FUDS) conducted an Inventory Project Report (INPR) (J09CA111001) on the site. Since then, more investigations have occurred in the 2000s. The most recent investigations indicate that high levels of lead and arsenic (as well as other potentially harmful chemicals) are found in the soil and a Remedial Investigation/Feasibility Study (RI/FS) should be conducted.

== See also ==
- Edson Range
- List of United States Marine Corps installations
- History of the United States Marine Corps
