= Abra Valley Colleges =

Private college in Abra, Philippines

- Former names: Abra Valley Junior College; Abra Valley Colleges
- Motto in English: To God be the Glory
- Type: Private
- Established: 1948
- Founder: Pedro V. Borgoña
- Chairman: Francis A. Borgoña
- President: Francis A. Borgoña
- Vice-president: Rose Lanie Abigail B. Santos( VP for Operations); Clarito Lopez (VP for Administration); Dr. Teresita J. Garcia(VP for Academic Affairs); Dr. Jess Dinglasan (Executive VP)
- Location: Corner McKinley and Taft Sts., Zone 4, Bangued, Abra, Philippines; 17°36′20″N 120°36′44″E
- Alma Mater song: AVC Hymn
- Colors: Green and white
- Website: web.archive.org/web/20130611065733/http://www.avc.edu.ph
- Location in the Luzon Location in the Philippines

The college was established in 1948 as Abra Valley Junior College and was later renamed to Abra Valley. In 1994, its name was again changed to Abra Valley Colleges. It is an academic institution located in Bangued, Abra, Philippines, which offers courses in nursing, criminology, hospitality and restaurant management, law, engineering, and information technology.

== History ==
In the province of Abra, located across the road of the former Abra High School (now Abra State Institute of Sciences and Technology-ASIST Bangued Campus) Abra Valley Colleges was the pioneer in tertiary-level institution.

The remnants of the Bayquen Hotel which was leveled to the ground in World War II was the present location of its building only made of bamboo materials and roofed with cogon. Students of those times even have to use umbrellas to shield themselves from raindrops and even raise their feet to the chairs to avoid the water on floor.

In 1948, through the leadership of Mr. Pedro V. Borgoña founded the Abra Valley Junior College, Inc. The old bamboo building was later on re-built into a concrete building that rose into a three-storey structure.

Graduates from most secondary schools of the province particularly from Abra High School enrolled here. The school was renamed Abra Valley College dropping the word "Junior" from the original name.

In 1993 the school was in public auction, but on December 22 of the same year, the eldest son of the founder Mr. Francis A. Borgoña redeemed the institution with the aid from his cousin Mr. Francisco del Rosario, and the school was renamed as Abra Valley Colleges.

In 1998, a Bachelor of Science in Criminology was offered. In 2000 courses were offered such as Bachelor of Secondary Education, Bachelor of Elementary Education, Bachelor of Science in Hotel & Restaurant Management, and Bachelor of Science in Information Technology.

== Struggles and problems ==
In the 1980s, Abra Valley College has number of students enrolled had decreased. The founder who was still the sitting president of the school grew ill. His wife died, and on December 2, 1994, he died too.

The school had suffered from serious problems, but with the determination of the present chairman of the board and President Mr. Francis A. Borgoña and the support of the employees, together they stood firm through thick and thin. The college was given another 50 years of corporate life by the Securities and Exchange Commission (SEC) with legitimate reason in spite of legal charges as regards its dissolution. The school was re-purchased from Mr. Francisco del Rosario making the college free from any debts.

On September 23, 2009, the Commission on Higher Education called for the closing of its law school for posting a performance percentile rank of zero in the bar examinations from 1999 to 2009.

== Present time ==
The college has produced professionals such as nurses, criminologists and educators. The college has a Speech Laboratory, a radio network partnered with the Manila Broadcasting Company (MBC) for the "Radio Natin" station ( formerly 95.3 HOT-FM) and the Abra Valley Colleges Community Health Research and Development Foundation, Inc. in 2001. In 2002, the AVC-ISP (Internet Service Provider) was created which served the students, employees, and their clients in private and private government offices Bangued, Abra.

The school has a Computer Laboratory installed with android smart board for the College of Computer Studies and Systems, Computer Laboratory for the College of Engineering and an electronic library or E-Lib with 10 computer units with internet.

A six-storey building has been provided to accommodate for the College of Laws, College of Education and the College of Computer Studies and Systems. A Research, Extension and Development Center has been established (Library).

== Departments/Programs ==
College of Law -

College of Education

Dr. Teresita J. Garcia (Dean)

College of Nursing - Helen D. Valera, RN,MAN (Dean)

-Divinia B. Eloisan, RN, MASE, MAN (Clinical Coordinator/Consultant, CON)

-Anavi B. Ibanez, RN (Program Head)

College of Criminology - Clarito Lopez (Dean)

College of Engineering - Engr. Jessie Palatao (Dean)

College of Social Work - Josephine V. Dumlao (Dean)

College of Business Administration - Dr. Arnold B. Molina (Dean)

Hotel and Tourism Management - Under BSBA

College of Computer Studies and Systems - Queenie Frances Victoria G. Borgoña, MIT (Dean)

-Jessica Claire M. Balubar, CS (Department Head, CCSS)

College of Liberal Arts - Rowelda Mateo (Head)

Elementary Department -

High School Department-

== Courses ==
- Bachelor of Laws (LLB)
- Bachelor of Arts (AB) major in
  - Mass Communication
  - English
  - Political Science
  - History
- Bachelor of Science in Architecture (BSA)
- Bachelor of Science in Civil Engineering (BSCE)
- Bachelor of Science in Business Administration (BSBA) major in
  - Financial Management
  - Human Resource Development Management
  - Marketing Management
- Bachelor of Science in Criminology (BSCRIM) - Accredited Level 1 by PACUCOA
- Bachelor of Elementary Education (BEED)
- Bachelor of Secondary Education (BSED) major in
  - English
  - Filipino
  - Mathematics
  - Social Studies
  - General Science
- Bachelor of Science in Hotel and Restaurant Management (BSHRM)

Ladderized Program with Areas of Competency
  - NC II Housekeeping
  - NC II Front Office Services
  - NC II Commercial Cooking

- Bachelore of Science in Information Technology (BSIT)
- Associate im Computer Technology
- B.Sc in nursing (BSN)
- B.Sc in Social Work (BSSW)
- High school
- Elementary
