= Marine Corps Air Ground Combat Center Twentynine Palms =

United States Marine Corps base in California

- Near Twentynine Palms, California in the United States
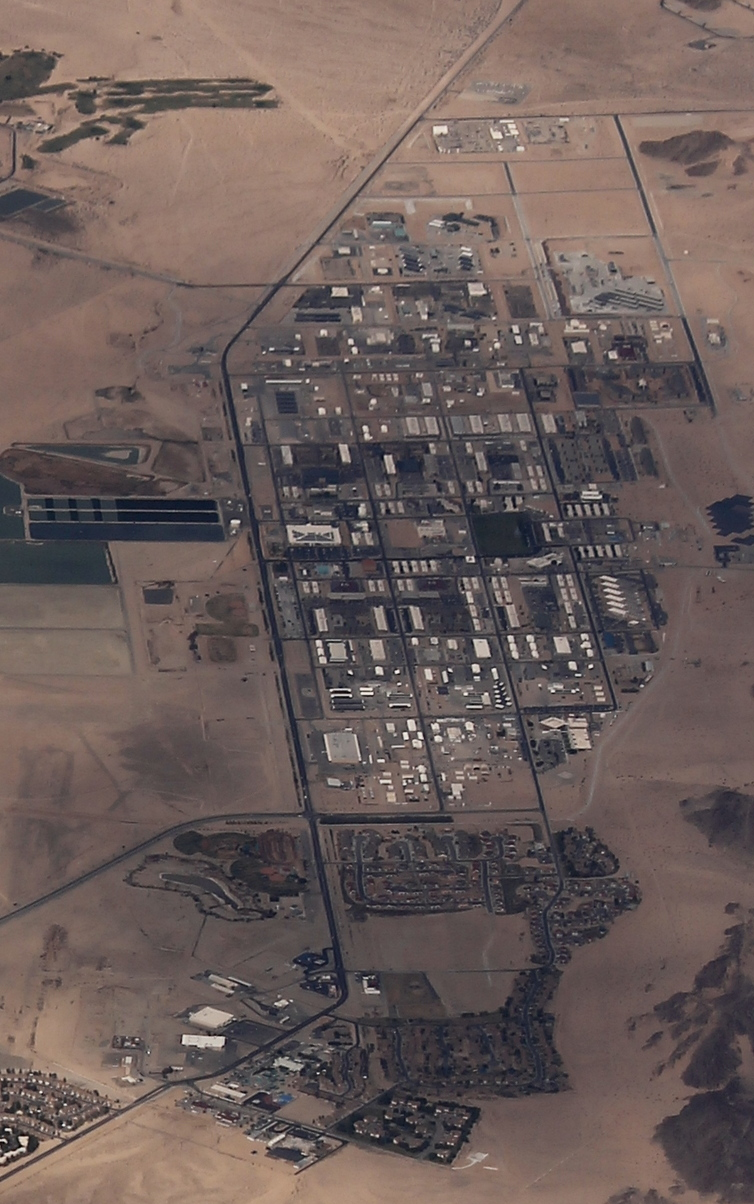
- Aerial image of the main camp

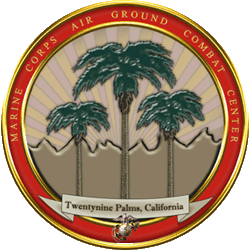

Site information
- Type: Training center
- Owner: Department of Defense
- Operator: US Marine Corps
- Controlled by: Marine Corps Training and Education Command
- Condition: Operational
- Website: 29palms.marines.mil

Location
- Location in the United States
- Coordinates: 34°13′54″N 116°03′42″W

Site history
- Built: 1952
- In use: 1952 – present

Garrison information
- Current commander: Major General Mark H. Clingan

Airfield information
- Identifiers: IATA: NXP, ICAO: KNXP, FAA LID: NXP, WMO: 690150
- Elevation: 625.1 metres (2,051 ft) AMSL
Runways
Direction	Length and surface
10/28	2,442.9 metres (8,015 ft) perforated steel planking (PSP)
- Airfield name: Strategic Expeditionary Landing Field (SELF)

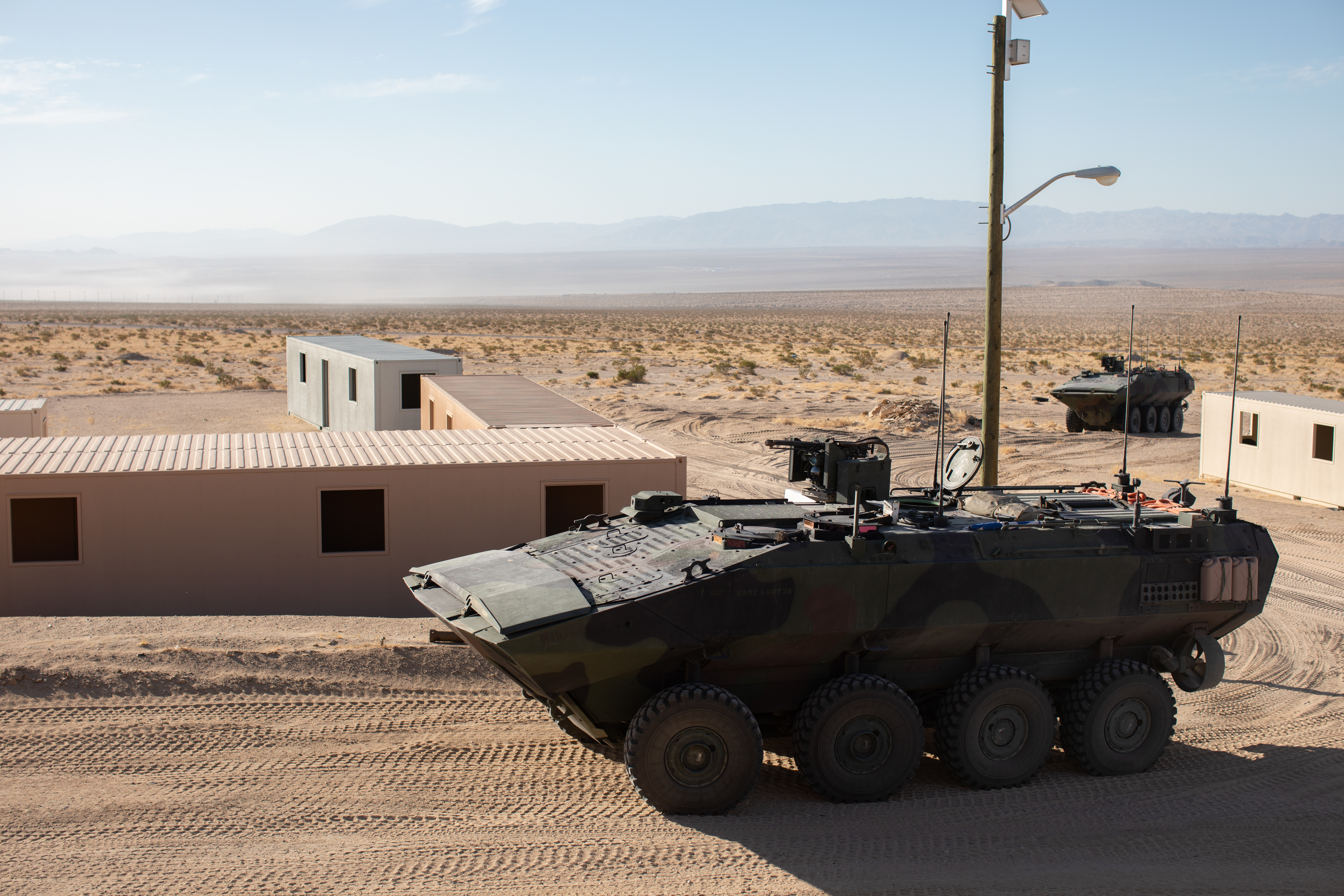
US Marines conducting an integrated training exercise (ITX) at MCAGCC Twentynine Palms during April 2021

The Marine Corps Air Ground Combat Center (MCAGCC), also known as 29 Palms, is the largest United States Marine Corps base. The base covers a total area of 1,102 square miles.

It was a census-designated place (CDP) officially known as Twentynine Palms Base located adjacent to the city of Twentynine Palms in southern San Bernardino County, California. As of the 2000 census, the base had a total population of 8,413. The Zip Code of the base is 92278; the base housing's Zip Code is 92277. The CDP was discontinued prior to the 2010 census.

== History ==
From 1942 through July 1944, during World War II, the airfield at Twentynine Palms was utilized by the U.S. Army Air Force for primary flight training. What is now the "Marine Corps Air Ground Combat Center" was taken over by the Eleventh Naval District, headquartered in San Diego, as Naval Auxiliary Air Station Twentynine Palms, in July 1944. After the war, its future was uncertain. Then, on August 20, 1952, Marine Corps Base Camp Pendleton Headquarters issued Post Order 343 creating the Marine Corps Training Center, Twentynine Palms.

During the Korean War, it became obvious that more live-fire training ranges were needed. Pendleton's Marines looked to the abandoned Condor Field, a World War II Army and Navy glider base located in the vicinity of what is now mainside. The base was designated on February 6, 1953, as Marine Corps Training Center, Twentynine Palms. By February 1, 1957, it grew to base status and was designated as Marine Corps Base, Twentynine Palms, Calif.

Only 70 Marines comprised the detachment at the center. Manned by Marines from Camp Pendleton, its primary mission was to prepare the new base for the arrival of permanent personnel. By mid-December, 1952, a fresh 3rd Marine Division, with assistance from the 12th Marine Regiment, conducted the first large-scale, live-fire field exercise aboard the base. The exercise gave Marines a glimpse of the facility's potential and foreshadowed the large-scale combined arms exercises for which the base is known.

In 1976, under the command of Brigadier General Ernest R. Reid Jr., work began to add an expeditionary airfield to the base's growing infrastructure. Following completion of the expeditionary airfield, its name was changed to Marine Corps Air Ground Combat Training Center on October 1, 1978, and changed yet once more to Marine Corps Air Ground Combat Center (MCAGCC) on February 16, 1979. It was also during this time that plans for the combined arms exercises were conceived. Supplanting an earlier exercise known as Desert Palm Tree, the new combined arms exercises were remarkable in two respects: the practice of combined arms, and live-fire and movement during the exercises were unprecedented in scale. Just as noteworthy was the creation of a Tactical Exercise Control Center with the primary purpose of controlling, instructing and critiquing the exercises. In the words of base historian, Colonel Verle E. Ludwig, "Twentynine Palms was to be a permanent 'combined-arms exercise college' for all of the Marine Corps."

On October 1, 2000, after 21 years as MCAGCC, the command was designated as Marine Air Ground Task Force Training Command, Twentynine Palms, California. This designation accompanied a change in policy that placed MAGTF Training Command under the auspices of Training and Education Command, Headquarters Marine Corps, MCCDC, Marine Corps Base Quantico, Virginia. The expeditionary airfield and surrounding spartan accommodations for visiting units was named "Camp Wilson".

The base is currently home to one of the largest military training areas in the nation. The program known as Mojave Viper has become the model of pre-Operation Iraqi Freedom deployment training. The majority of units in the Marine Corps deploying to Iraq were trained at Mojave Viper or a mixed training venue using the Mountain Warfare Training Center (south of Lake Tahoe) for Afghanistan. Live fire exercises, artillery, tank, and close air support training are used for training, in addition to the sprawling "Combat Town," a 274-acre (1,110,000 m^{2}) fabricated Middle Eastern village, complete with a mosque, native role-players, an "IED Alley," and other immersive touches.

In August 2008, the Marine Corps submitted a land withdrawal application to the Bureau of Land Management for approximately 422,000 acres (1,710 km^{2}) contiguous to base as part of an ongoing study by the Marine Corps for possible base expansion, along with the establishment of corresponding special-use airspace, necessary to train a Marine expeditionary brigade at the Combat Center.

== Based units ==
- 7th Marine Regiment
- 3rd Battalion 11th Marines
- 3rd LAR Battalion
- MWSS-374
- CLB-7
- MCCES
- MCTOG
- MCLOG
- TTECG

== Geography ==
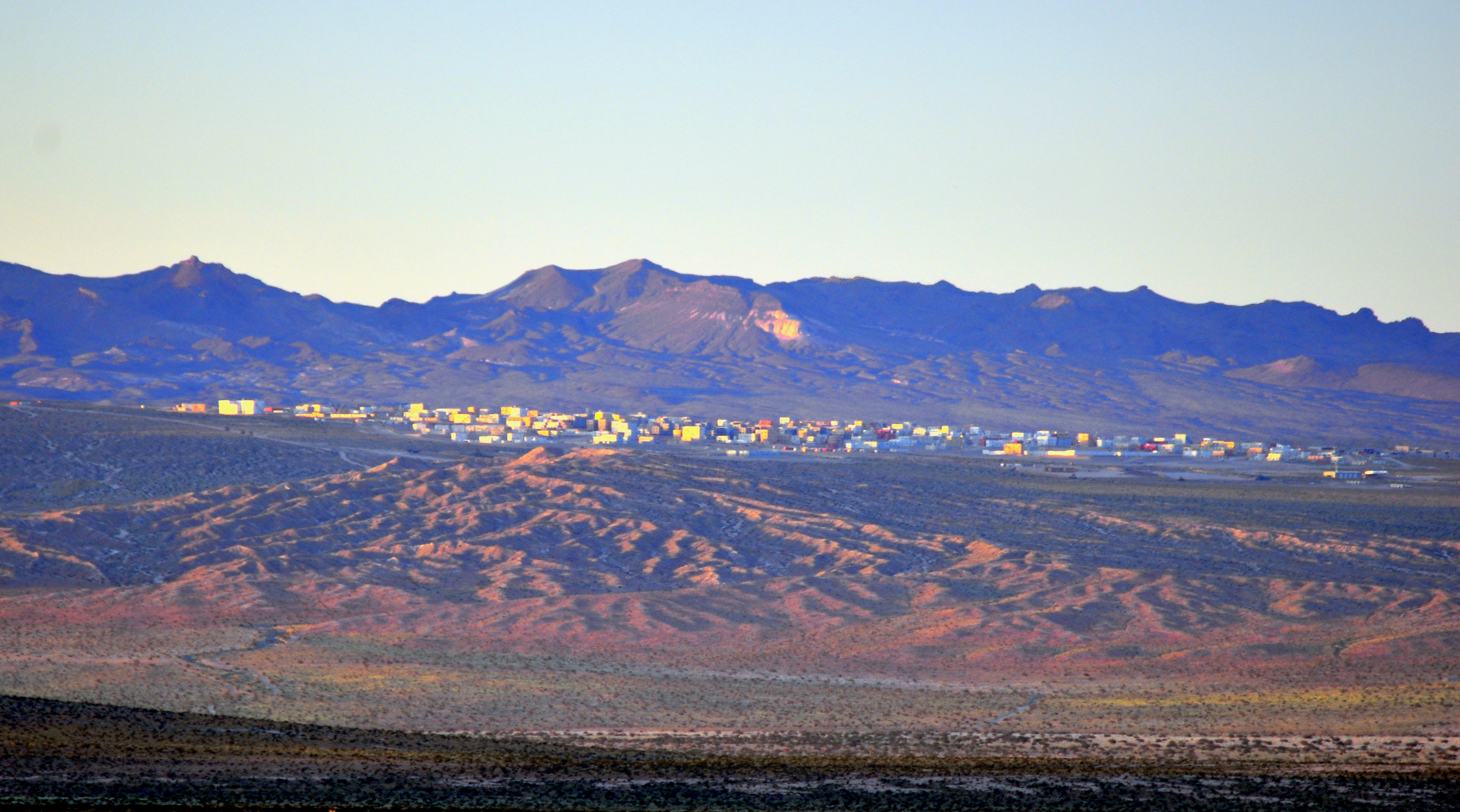
The newest training facility is directly adjacent to Landers, California, seen here just before sunset.

Twentynine Palms Base is located within the Morongo Basin and the High Desert region of the Mojave Desert in Southern California. MCAGCC Twentynine Palms is approximately 98 miles from the Marine Corps Logistics Base Barstow, Barstow, California.

According to the United States Census Bureau, the base has a total area of 1.4 mi^{2} (3.6 km^{2}). This area is all land with none covered by water. This area covers only the main cantonment, which includes the base housing; the entire installation is far larger, with 931.7 mi^{2} (2,413 km^{2}) of surface area, all land. There was a resident population of 14,090 on this territory as of the 2000 census.

The terrain is consistent, with steeply sloped mountains and flat valleys running northwest–southeast, with elevations ranging from 1,800 to 4,500 feet (1,400 m) above sea level. The training area is also characterized with ancient lava flows, as well as dry lake beds and arroyos (or wadis) that fill quickly during rain, presenting the danger of powerful floods and washouts that can move armored vehicles. Many abandoned mines dot the terrain, as well as unexploded ordnance and shrapnel, making unauthorized travel in the training areas dangerous.

The climate is described best as arid and upland desert. Summer temperatures can peak at 120 °F and bottom at 15 °F in the winter, with an annual average of 67 °F. Precipitation averages four inches (100 mm) annually, most often in the fall and winter months. Weather is generally clear and sunny with low humidity.

== Demographics ==
Historical population
Census	Pop.	Note	%±
1970	5,647		—
1980	7,079		25.4%
1990	10,606		49.8%
2000	8,413		−20.7%
U.S. Decennial Census; 1970 1980; 1990 2000 2010

The residential portion of the base was listed as census designated place under the name Twentynine Palms Base in the 1970 U.S. census. The CDP was annexed to the city of Twentynine Palms prior to the 2010 U.S. census.

As of the census of 2000, there were 8,413 people, 912 households, and 904 families residing on the base. The population density was 2,287.5 people/km^{2} (5,925 people/mi^{2}). There were 1,006 housing units at an average density of 273.5 units/km^{2} (708 units/mi^{2}). The racial makeup of the base was 70.3% White, 10.4% African American, 1.4% Native American, 3.1% Asian, 0.3% Pacific Islander, 9.5% from other races, and 5.1% from two or more races. 19.6% of the population were Hispanic or Latino of any race.

There were 912 households, out of which 73.1% had children under the age of 18 living with them, 94.5% were married couples living together, 3.5% had a female householder with no husband present, and 0.8% were non-families. 0.8% of all households were made up of individuals, and <0.1% had someone living alone who was 65 years of age or older. The average household size was 3.4 and the average family size was 3.4.

The age distribution of the base is: 15.4% under the age of 18, 67.0% from 18 to 24, 16.8% from 25 to 44, 0.7% from 45 to 64, and <0.1% who were 65 years of age or older. The median age was 21 years. For every 100 females, there were 404.1 males. For every 100 females age 18 and over, there were 596.3 males. These statistics were consistent with the area's military status.

The median income for a household on the base was $29,500, and the median income for a family was $29,594. Males had a median income of $14,111 versus $17,014 for females. The per capita income for the base was $12,615. 12.1% of the population and 11.9% of families were below the poverty line. Out of the total population, 14.0% of those under the age of 18 and 0.0% of those 65 and older were living below the poverty line.

== Government ==
In the United States House of Representatives, Twentynine Palms Base is in the California's 23rd congressional district, represented by Republican Jay Obernolte.

== List of commanders ==
- MajGen Lewis A. Craparotta, July 10, 2014 – July 10, 2016
- MajGen Roger B. Turner Jr., July 10, 2016 – August 13, 2020
- MajGen William Jurney, August 13, 2020 – June 4, 2021
- MajGen Austin E. Renforth, June 4, 2021 – July 5, 2023
- MajGen Thomas B. Savage, July 5, 2023 – present

== See also ==
- Condor Field
- Twentynine Palms Strategic Expeditionary Landing Field
- List of United States Marine Corps installations
