= Twentynine Palms Strategic Expeditionary Landing Field =

Twentynine Palms SELF
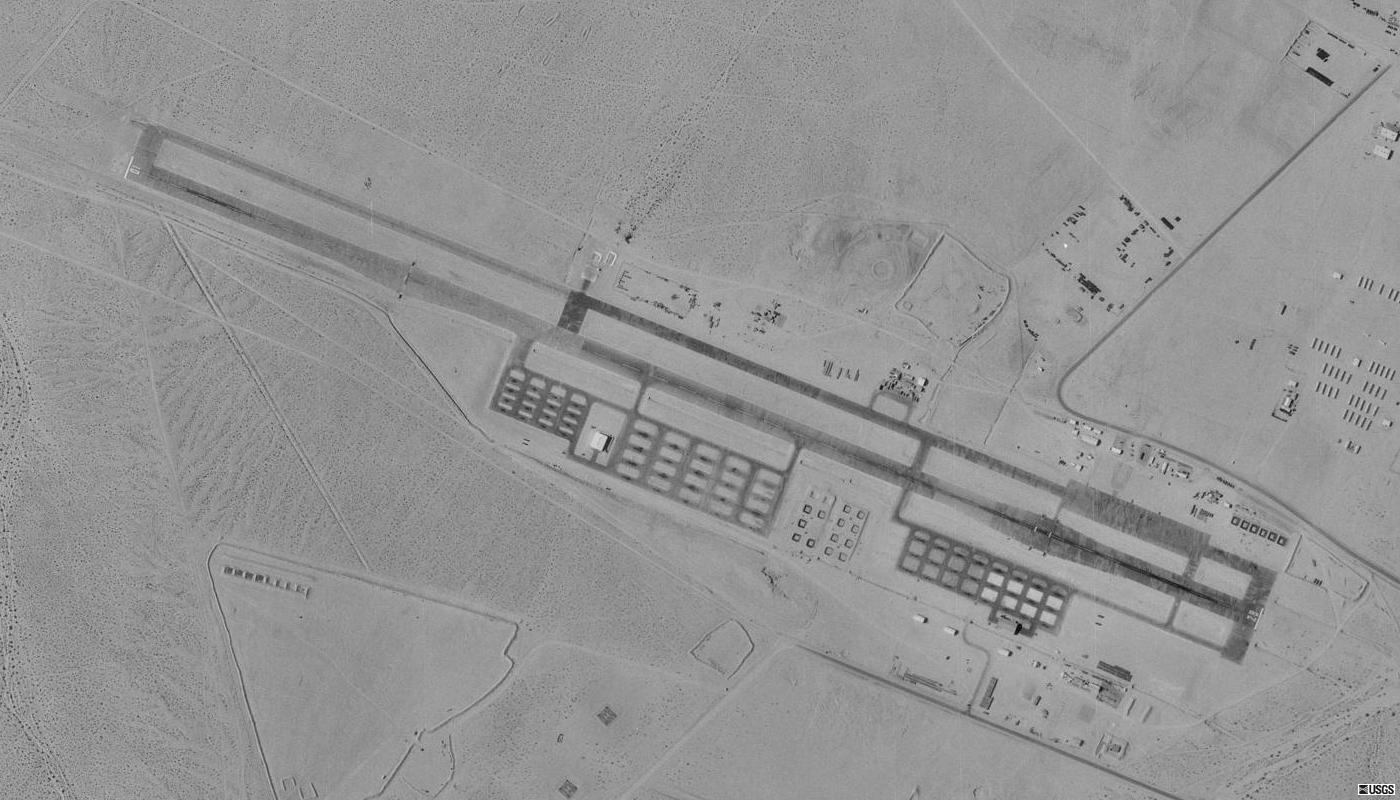
- USGS aerial image - 22 May 1994
- IATA: none; ICAO: KNXP; FAA LID: NXP

Summary
- Airport type: Military
- Owner: U.S. Navy
- Operator: U.S. Marine Corps
- Location: San Bernardino County, near Twentynine Palms, California
- Elevation AMSL: 2,051 ft / 625 m
- Coordinates: 34°17′46″N 116°09′44″W
- Website: www.29palms.usmc.mil
- Interactive map of Twentynine Palms SELF

Runways
Direction	Length		Surface
Direction	ft	m	Surface
10/28	8,015	2,443	AM-2
- Source: Federal Aviation Administration

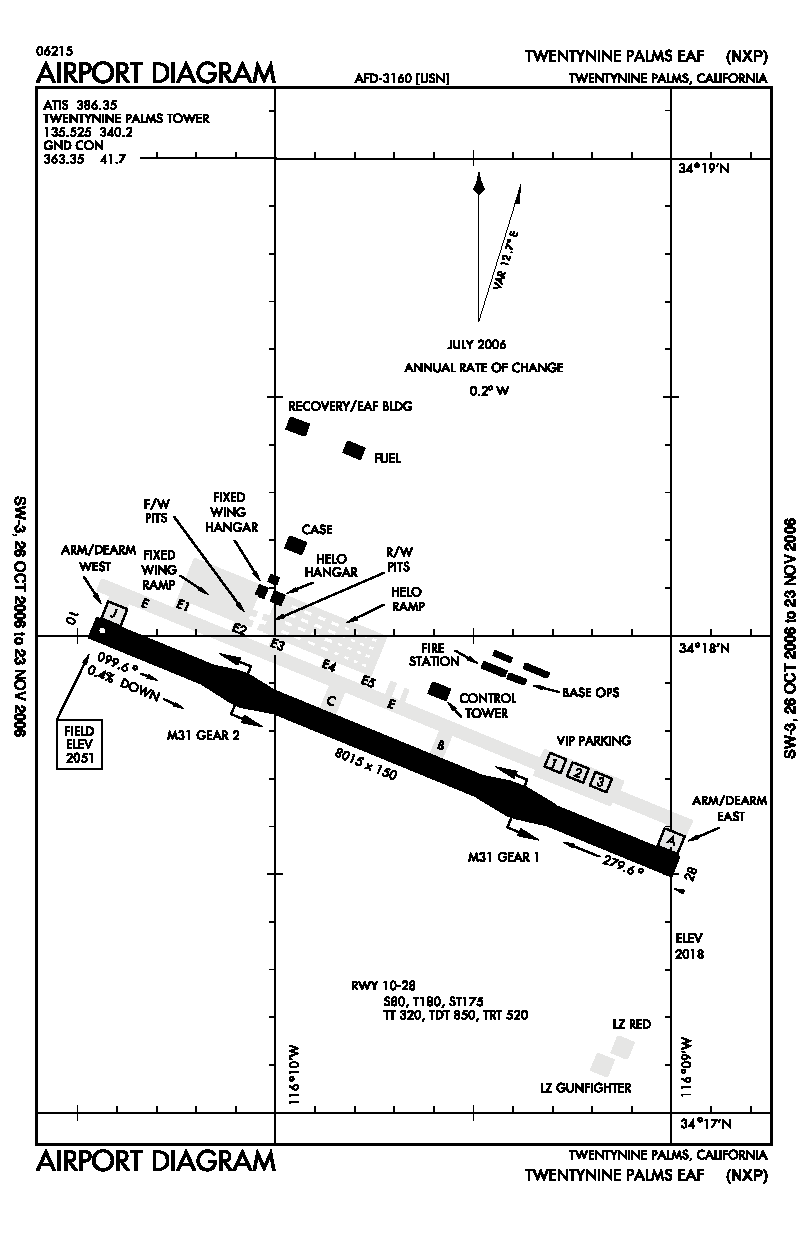
FAA diagram, effective 26 October 2006

Twentynine Palms Strategic Expeditionary Landing Field or Twentynine Palms SELF (ICAO: KNXP, FAA LID: NXP) is a military use airfield located nine nautical miles (17 km) northwest of the central business district of Twentynine Palms, a city in San Bernardino County, California, United States. The SELF is the largest expeditionary airfield (EAF) operated by the United States Marine Corps. It is also known as the Twentynine Palms EAF and is located at the Marine Corps Air Ground Combat Center (MCAGCC) Twentynine Palms.

== History ==
=== History of the EAF ===
The history of the Expeditionary Airfield (EAF) and its supporting units is closely interwoven. In March 1977, General Louis H. Wilson, the 26th Commandant of the Marine Corps, activated the EAF. The initial unit placed in charge of the EAF was designated Detachment MABS-11. Two years later, in July 1979, Detachment MABS-11 became operationally attached to Marine Wing Support Group 37 (MWSG-37) and was redesignated MWSG-37, Detachment Bravo in 1982. Originally, only a cadre of Marines provided caretaker support for the EAF between exercises. However, during October 1988 MWSS-173 was transferred from MCAS Kaneohe Bay to the Marine Corps Air Ground Combat Center, Twentynine Palms in support of the EAF. On 4 March 1993, MWSS-173 was deactivated and Aviation Ground Support Element (AGSE) was activated to continue operating and maintaining the EAF. On 1 April 1999, AGSE deactivated and was redesignated as Marine Wing Support Squadron 374(- reinforced) (MWSS-374). Currently the squadron is over 700 strong, and possesses the ability to operate a tactical airfield including air traffic control services and maintaining ground and weapons support equipment for aircraft.

=== EAF 29 Palms ===
The 29 Palms EAF is under operational control of the Commanding General, Third Marine Aircraft Wing. Day-to-day operations are the responsibility of the Marines of MWSS-374. The EAF was built in 1976 to test the Naval services aluminum expeditionary runway concept. The austere EAF is an example of what Naval aviation would use in a tactical situation where no prior airfield exists. It is a cornerstone of the Marine Corps' Combined Arms Exercise (CAX) Program. Today's EAF has changed very little since the original construction. Over three million square feet of aluminum AM-2 matting make up the primary runway, taxiways, and parking areas. The EAF operates as a "host nation" airfield to which deployed units bring their own organic support. Support functions provided at the EAF include the following: Airfield Operations, Air Traffic Control, Airfield Construction, Maintenance and Repair, Aircraft Rescue and Fire Fighting, Common Aviation Support Equipment, Explosive Ordnance Disposal, Weather Services, Communications, Aircraft Refueling, Fuel Storage, Engineer Support, and Motor Transport.

== Facilities ==
Strategic Expeditionary Landing Field (SELF) is a military airfield with an aluminum matted surface that is designed for sustained operations in an amphibious objective area. The runway, taxiways, and aircraft parking areas are constructed entirely of AM-2 aluminum matting. The AM-2 surface matting is a fabricated aluminum panel 1.5" thick, which consists of a hollow, extruded, one-piece main section with extruded end connectors welded to each end. The top surface of the AM-2 matting is coated with a non-skid material.

The runway is 8,000 by 150 feet (2,438 by 46 m) and can accommodate the largest aircraft in the military inventory: the C-5 Galaxy and C-17 Globemaster. In a normal year, Aviation Ground Support Detachment operates the SELF 300 days, conducts 3,600 hours of flight operations, supports 16,647 aircraft, and pumps over five million gallons of jet fuel.
