= Ana Marta González =

Spanish philosopher

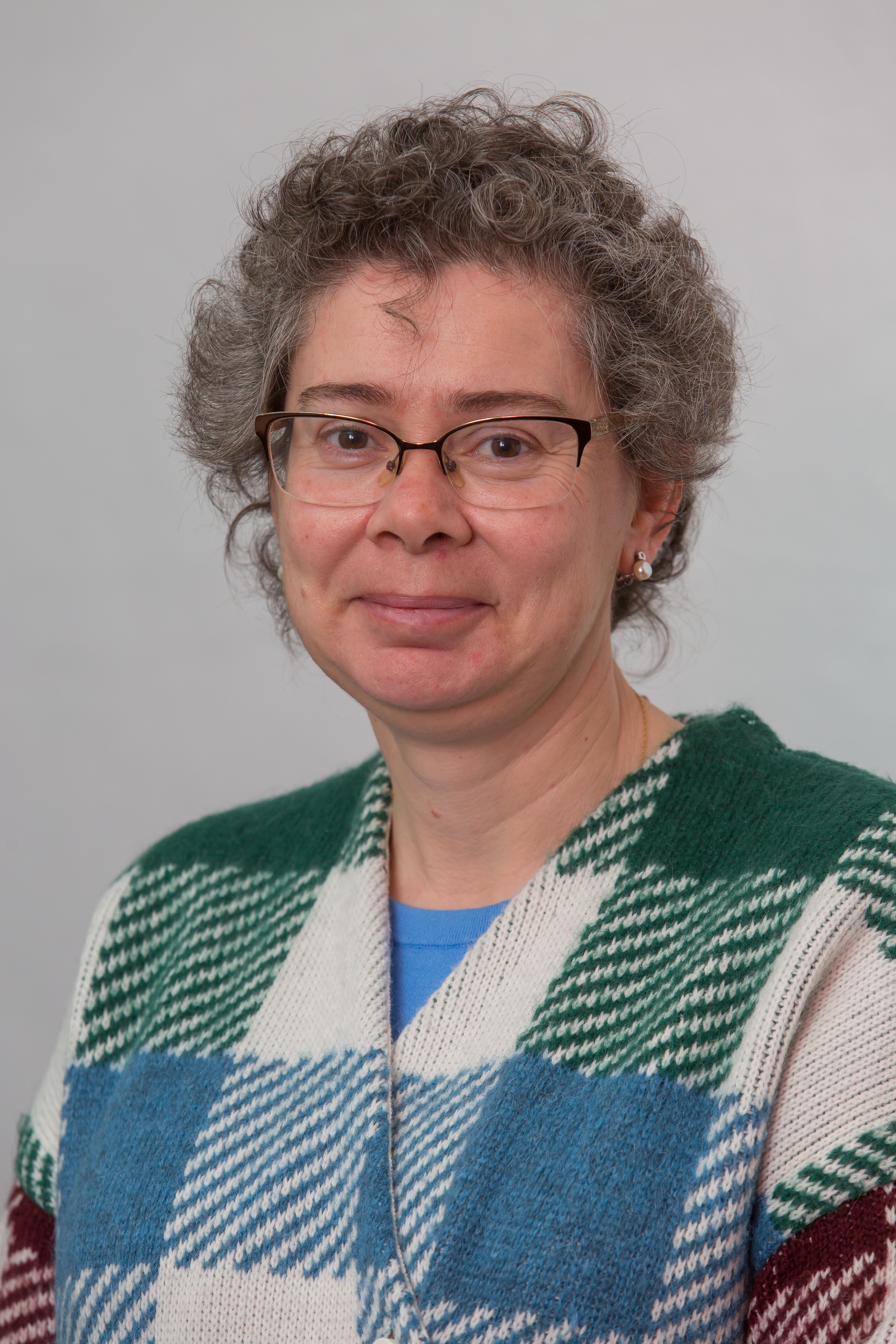
- González in 2019
- Born: Ana Marta González González; 23 October 1969 (age 56); Ourense, Spain
- Occupations: professor; philosopher

Academic background
- Education: University of Navarra
- Thesis: Secundum naturam. La naturaleza como principio de moralidad en Tomás de Aquino (1997)
- Doctoral advisor: Alejandro Llano Cifuentes

Academic work
- Discipline: Moral philosophy
- Institutions: University of Navarra
- Main interests: ethical foundations and the relationship between moral philosophy and social sciences

Ana Marta González González (Ourense, 23 October 1969) is a Spanish professor and philosopher. Her research focuses on ethical foundations and the relationship between moral philosophy and social sciences.

== Education ==
Gonzalez received her PhD in philosophy from the University of Navarra (1997) with an extraordinary prize for her thesis Secundum naturam. La naturaleza como principio de moralidad en Tomás de Aquino, which was supervised by Alejandro Llano Cifuentes. She completed her training thanks to a Fulbright scholarship (2002) with which she conducted postdoctoral research at Harvard University on "Naturaleza, cultura y moralidad en la filosofía práctica de Kant" (Nature, culture and morality in Kant's practical philosophy).

== Career ==
Since 2010, she has been principal investigator of the interdisciplinary research group "Cultura emocional e identidad: Diagnóstico de las sociedades contemporáneas desde el prisma de las emociones" (Emotional Culture and Identity: Diagnosis of Contemporary Societies from the Prism of Emotions), at the University of Navarra's Instituto Cultura y Sociedad (ICS), and of which she was scientific director between 2012 and 2019.

She serves as Professor of Moral Philosophy in the Department of Philosophy at the University of Navarra, and academic director of the Culture & Lifestyles area of the university's Social Trends Institute.

Gonzalez is a corresponding member of the Pontifical Academy of Saint Thomas Aquinas (2003), and a member of the Pontifical Academy of Social Sciences (2016), appointed by Pope Francis.

She has written numerous articles in specialized journals as well as books on philosophy, ethics and society.

== Selected works ==
=== Books ===
- González, Ana Marta (1996). Naturaleza y dignidad : un estudio desde Robert Spaemann. Ediciones Universidad de Navarra (EUNSA). ISBN 84-313-1412-5. OCLC 35008635.
- González, Ana Marta (1998). Moral, razón y naturaleza : una investigación sobre Tomás de Aquino. EUNSA. ISBN 84-313-1581-4. OCLC 38896404.
- González, Ana Marta (1999). Expertos en sobrevivir : ensayos ético-políticos (1 ed.). EUNSA. ISBN 84-313-1731-0. OCLC 42933068.
- González, Ana Marta (2000). En busca de la naturaleza perdida : estudios de bioética fundamental. eunsa. ISBN 84-313-1820-1. OCLC 45385433.
- Seidler, Victor; González, Ana Marta (2008). Gender identities in a globalized world. Humanities Press. ISBN 978-1-59102-674-7. OCLC 954952919.
- González, Ana Marta (2006). Claves de ley natural. Ediciones Rialp. ISBN 84-321-3580-1. OCLC 70766694.
- González, Ana Marta (2006). Moral, razón y naturaleza : una investigación sobre Tomás de Aquino (2nd ed.). ISBN 978-84-313-2357-8. OCLC 903969748.
- González González, Ana Marta; García Martínez, Alejandro Néstor (2007). Distinción social y moda. EUNSA. ISBN 978-84-313-2445-2. OCLC 847484004.
- González, Ana Marta (2008). Contemporary perspectives on natural law : natural law as a limiting concept. Ashgate. ISBN 978-0-7546-9299-7. OCLC 460042505.
- González, Ana Marta (2009). La ética explorada. EUNSA. ISBN 978-84-313-2651-7. OCLC 441761819.
- González, Ana Marta (2009). Ficción e identidad : ensayos de cultura postmoderna. Rialp. ISBN 978-84-321-3728-0. OCLC 934287581.
- González, Ana Marta; Vigo, Alejandro G. (2010). Practical rationality. Scope and structures of human agency. Georg Olms Verlag. ISBN 978-3-487-14330-9 OCLC 643741759
- González, Ana Marta (2011). Culture as Mediation. Kant on nature, culture and morality. Georg Olms Verlag. ISBN 978-3-487-14553-2 OCLC 712113228
- González, Ana Marta; Bovone, Laura (2012). Identities through fashion. An interdisciplinary approach. Berg. ISBN 978-0-85785-058-4 OCLC 1028017701
- González, Ana Marta (2013). The emotions and cultural analysis. Ashgate. ISBN 978-1-4094-5318-5 OCLC 984788453
- González, Ana Marta (2013). Sociedad civil y normatividad : la teoría social de David Hume. Dykinson. ISBN 978-84-9031-608-5 OCLC 963749935
- González, Ana Marta; Iffland, Craig (2014). Care professions and globalization. Theoretical and practical perspectives. ISBN 978-1-349-47956-6, 978-1-137-37648-0 OCLC 7335430458
- González, Ana Marta (2015). Margaret S. Archer sobre cultura y socialización en la modernidad tardía. EUNSA. ISBN 978-1-5129-5848-5. OCLC 1054062953.
- González, Ana Marta (2016). La articulación ética de la vida social. Comares. ISBN 978-84-9045-387-2. OCLC 951089747.
- González, Ana Marta; Davis, Joseph E. (2016). To fix or to heal: patient care, public health and the limits of biomedicine. New York University Press. ISBN 978-1-4798-8415-5 OCLC 992502504
- González, Ana Marta; Vigo, Alejandro G. (2019). Gefühl, Identität im Anschluß an Kant//Reflection, emotion, identity from Kant onwards. Duncker & Humblot. ISBN 978-1-4094-5318-5 OCLC 1112092516
- González, Ana Marta (2021). Kant on culture, happiness and civilization. Palgrave. ISBN 978-3-030-66468-8 OCLC 1246512815
- González, Ana Marta (2021). El claroscuro catalán. Nación, emociones e identidad en el proceso independentista. Rialp. ISBN 978-84-321-5426-3 OCLC 1286242071
- González, Ana Marta (2021). Descubrir el nombre : Subjetividad, Identidad y Socialidad. Comares. ISBN 978-84-1369-123-7. OCLC 1245845268.
