= Carlström =

Carlström or Carlstrom is a surname. Notable people with the surname include:

== People ==
- John Carlstrom (born 1957), American astrophysicist and Professor at the University of Chicago
- Kjell Carlström (born 1976), Finnish road racing cyclist for UCI ProTour team Team Sky
- Lennart Carlström, Swedish orienteering competitor
- Oscar E. Carlstrom (1878–1948), Illinois Attorney General
- Sten-Olof Carlström, Swedish orienteering competitor
- Swede Carlstrom (1886–1935), Major League Baseball shortstop
- Victor Carlstrom (1890–1917) Swedish-American aviator

== Things ==
- Carlstrom Field, named for Lt. Victor Carlstrom, (1890–1917)
