= Woodward Field =

Woodward Field may refer to:

- Woodward Field (airport) in Camden, South Carolina, United States.
- Woodward Field (stadium) in Cheney, Washington, United States.
- Woodward Field (historical airport) in Salt Lake City, Utah, United States. Salt Lake City's first airport, now evolved into the modern day Salt Lake City International Airport.
