= Crookston Municipal Airport =

Airport in Polk County, Minnesota

Crookston Municipal Airport Kirkwood Field
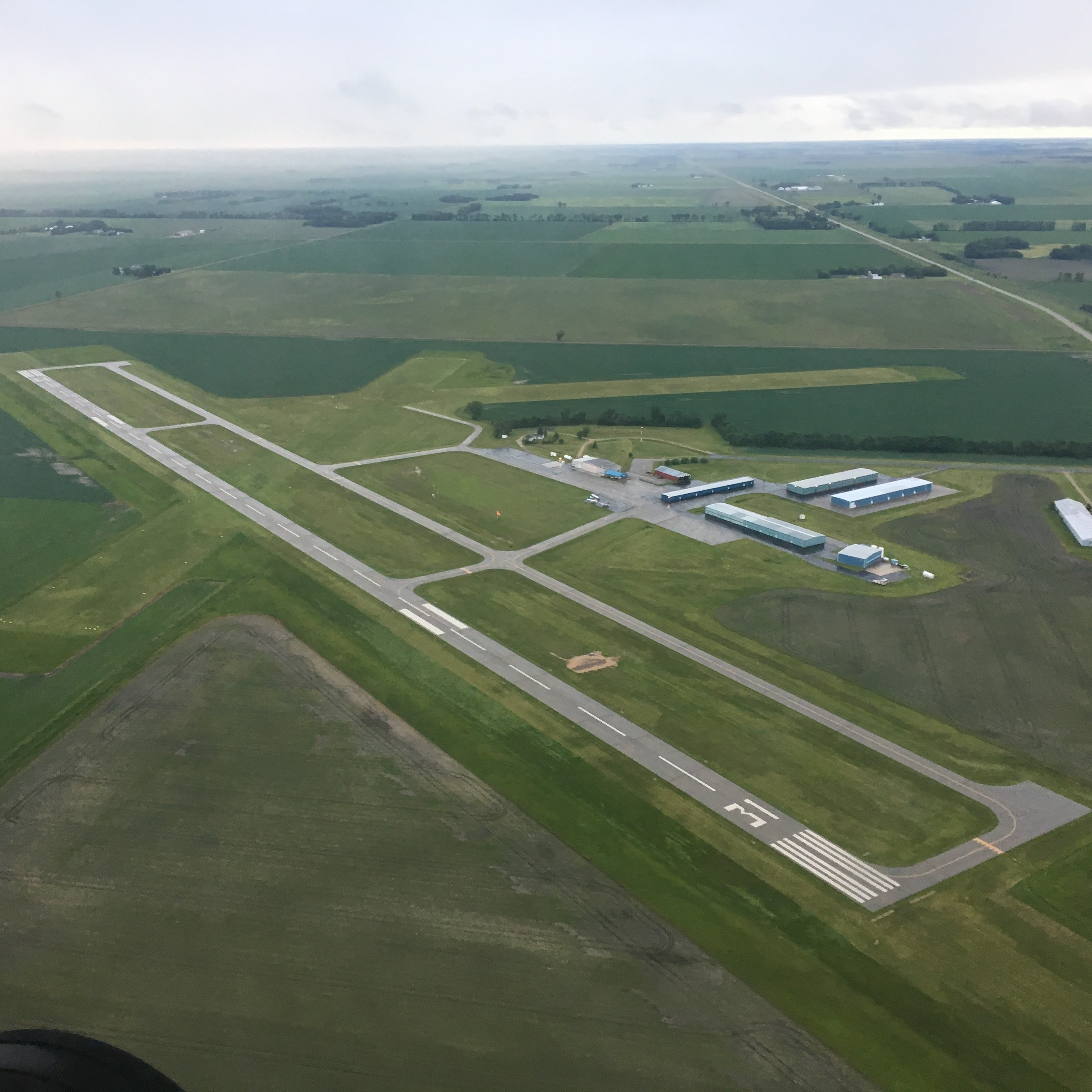
- 2017 photo
- IATA: CKN; ICAO: KCKN; FAA LID: CKN

Summary
- Airport type: Public
- Owner: City of Crookston
- Serves: Crookston, Minnesota
- Location: Lowell Township, Polk County, near Crookston, Minnesota
- Elevation AMSL: 899 ft (274 m)
- Coordinates: 47°50′27″N 96°37′18″W

Map
- Location of airport in Minnesota / United States CKN (the United States)

Runways
Direction	Length		Surface
Direction	ft	m	Surface
13/31	4,300	1,311	Asphalt
17/35	2,977	907	Turf
6/24	2,096	639	Turf

Statistics
- Aircraft operations (2006): 20,150
- Based aircraft (2017): 36
- Source: Federal Aviation Administration

Crookston Municipal Airport (IATA: CKN, ICAO: KCKN, FAA LID: CKN), also known as Kirkwood Field, is a city-owned public-use airport located four nautical miles (7 km) north of the central business district of Crookston, a city in Polk County, Minnesota, United States.

== History ==
The airport provided contract glider training to the United States Army Air Forces from 1942 to 1944. Training was provided by L. Millar-Wittig. There was a turf 5,000' all-way airfield for landings and takeoffs. Using primarily C-47 Skytrains and Waco CG-4 non-powered gliders. The mission of the school was to train glider pilot students in proficiency of operation of gliders in various types of towed and soaring flight, both day and night, and in servicing of the gliders on the field.

== Facilities and aircraft ==
Crookston Municipal Airport covers an area of 633 acres (256 ha) at an elevation of 899 feet (274 m) above mean sea level. It has three runways: 13/31 is 4,300 by 75 feet (1,311 x 23 m) with an asphalt surface; 17/35 is 2,977 by 202 feet (907 x 62 m) with a turf surface; 6/24 is 2,096 by 202 feet (639 x 62 m) with a turf surface.

For the 12-month period ending August 31, 2006, the airport had 20,150 aircraft operations, an average of 55 per day: 94% general aviation, 5% air taxi and less than 1% military. In March 2017, there were 36 aircraft based at this airport: all 36 single-engine.

== See also ==
- List of airports in Minnesota
- Minnesota World War II Army Airfields
- 29th Flying Training Wing (World War II)
