= Monticello Field =

Former airfield in Sherburne County, Minnesota

Coordinates: 45°18′54″N 93°46′41″W

Location of Monticello Field, Minnesota

Monticello Field is a former airport and military airfield in Big Lake Township, Minnesota, United States, approximately a mile northeast of Monticello. It is inactive.

== History ==
Opened during World War II as a 5,000 by 5,000 feet (1,500 m × 1,500 m) all-way turf airfield. Provided contract glider training to the United States Army Air Forces, 1942–1944. Training provided by Hinck Flying Service. Used primarily C-47 Skytrains and Waco CG-4 unpowered Gliders. The mission of the school was to train glider pilot students in proficiency in operation of gliders in various types of towed and soaring flight, both day and night, and in servicing of gliders in the field.

Inactivated during 1944 with the drawdown of AAFTC's pilot training program. Declared surplus and turned over to the Army Corps of Engineers on 30 September 1945. Eventually discharged to the War Assets Administration (WAA) and became a civil airport in 1946.

Operated as Pilots Cove Airfield (20Y). Aerial photography shows the remains of a hangar and land indicates use as a turf runway, which are now closed.

== See also ==
- Minnesota World War II Army Airfields
- 29th Flying Training Wing (World War II)
