= Stewart Airport =

Stewart Airport may refer to:

- Stewart International Airport, near Newburgh, New York, United States (IATA/FAA: SWF)
- Stewart Aerodrome, near Stewart, British Columbia, Canada (IATA: ZST)
- Everett-Stewart Regional Airport, near Union City, Tennessee, United States (IATA/FAA: UCY)
