= Arnold Scheme =

Fighter Pilot Training Program

The Arnold Scheme was established to train British RAF pilots in the United States of America during World War II. Its name derived from US General Henry H. Arnold, Chief of the United States Army Air Forces, the instigator of the scheme, which ran from June 1941 to March 1943.

== Background ==
In the early years of the Second World War there was an acute need to train pilots for the Royal Air Force. The United Kingdom was considered largely unsuitable due to a combination of enemy action, high operational traffic at airfields and unpredictable weather. Several overseas training schemes were therefore established, including the British Commonwealth Air Training Plan, the British Flying Training Schools and the Arnold Scheme. The scheme was one product of the climate of greater co-operation between the United Kingdom and the then neutral United States following the introduction of Lend-Lease in March 1941.

== Introduction and operation ==
In April 1941 General 'Hap' Arnold flew to London and met with RAF officers at the Air Ministry, offering to train four thousand British pilots alongside American aviation cadets. The British Air Council accepted the generous offer and planning began immediately. On 10 May 1941, in a telegram to US President Franklin D. Roosevelt, British Prime Minister Winston Churchill referred to the "splendid offer which General Arnold made to us of one-third of the rapidly expanding capacity for pilot training in the United States to be filled with pupils from here", stating that "the first five hundred and fifty of our young men are now ready to leave".

Unlike the British Flying Training Schools, training was to be carried out by the United States Army Air Corps and based at both military bases and contract civilian flying schools in the Southeast Air Corps Training Center area, one of three large geographical training centres established in the USA. Training was divided into separate primary, basic and advanced courses, held at various flying schools and bases, and each training centre headquarters was assigned one rated RAF administrative officer. Each school had a subordinate non-rated RAF administrative officer to handle discipline and pay. Prior to the USA's entry into the War following the Attack on Pearl Harbor on 7 December 1941, RAF cadets were required to wear civilian clothes.

Primary flying courses were run by experienced civilian American instructors and took place over 9 to 10 weeks at civilian contract schools at Woodward Field in South Carolina, Albany and Americus in Georgia, Carlstrom Field, Arcadia and Lakeland in Florida, and Tuscaloosa in Alabama. Basic flying training, under the instruction of USAAC and RAF flight instructors, lasted nine to ten weeks at either Cochran Field at Macon, Georgia or Gunter Field, Montgomery, Alabama. Advanced flying training schools conducted single-engine courses, held at Craig Field or Napier Field in Alabama, and multi-engine courses, originally at Maxwell Field and Napier Field, Alabama and Turner Field, Georgia, but later at Turner Field and Moody Field, Georgia.

Between June 1941 and March 1943 a total of 7,885 RAF personnel entered the scheme. Of these, 3,392 were eliminated or 'washed out' and 81 were killed in training. Of the cadets who successfully completed training, 577 were retained for approximately one year as instructors, the remainder returning to the UK. Most successful students became sergeant pilots, but 1,070 were commissioned. Pilot officer Cyril Joe Barton, a graduate of the scheme, was later awarded the Victoria Cross. Sir Michael Beetham, who also trained under the scheme, later became a Marshal of the Royal Air Force.
