= 29th Flying Training Wing (U.S. Army Air Forces) =

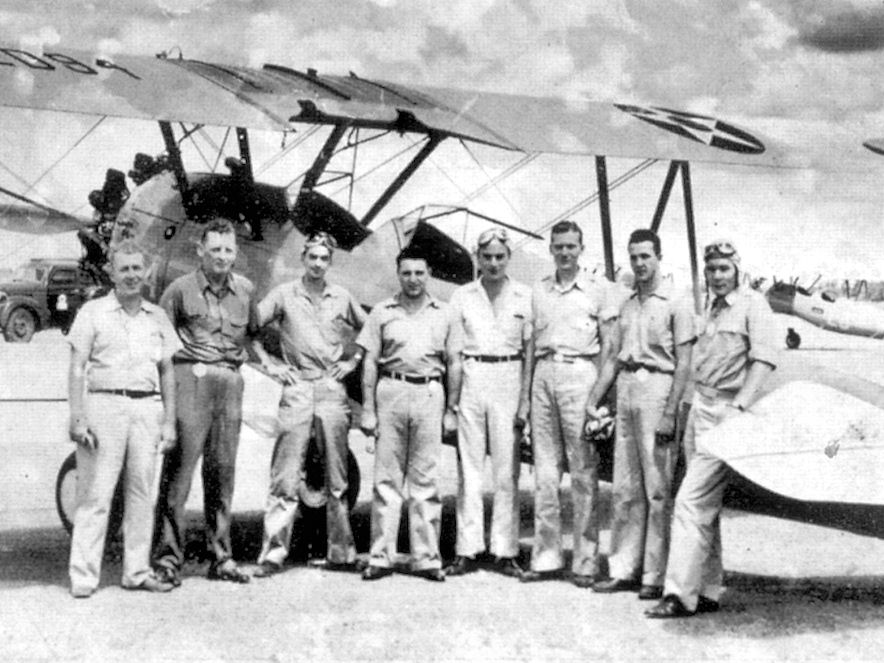
- Flight instructors with a PT-17 Stearman biplane trainer
- Active: 1942–1946
- Country: United States
- Branch: United States Army Air Forces
- Type: Command of flying training units
- Role: Training
- Part of: Army Air Forces Training Command
- Engagements: World War II: World War II American Theater

Commanders
- 26 December 1942: Col Fred C. Nelson
- 10 February 1943: Brig Gen John G. Williams
- 4 April 1945: Col Raymond L. Winn
- 25 May – 1 November 1945: Brig Gen Clinton D. Vincent
- through 16 Jun 1946: Unknown

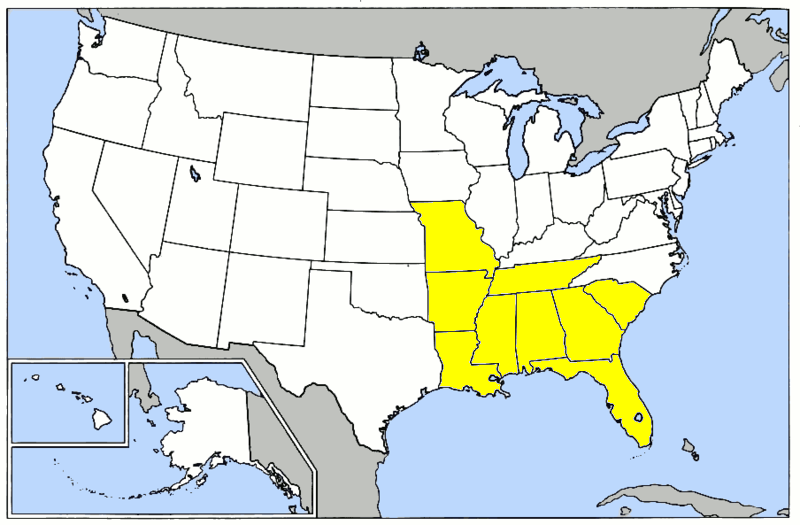
Locations of airfields controlled by the 29th Flying Training Wing

The 29th Flying Training Wing was a wing of the United States Army Air Forces. It was last assigned to the Western Flying Training Command, and was disbanded on 16 June 1946 at Napier Field, Alabama. The wing controlled World War II Phase One primary flying training units of the Army Air Forces Training Command. Headquartered at Moody Field, Georgia for most of its operational service, it controlled contract civilian-operated pilot schools primarily in the Southeastern United States.

There is no lineage connection between the 29th Flying Training Wing, established on 22 December 1939 as the 29th Bombardment Group (Heavy) at Langley Field, Virginia, and this organization.

== History ==
Until 1939, the United States Army Air Corps provided all flying training with military instructor pilots. Beginning in 1939, it contracted with nine civilian flying schools to provide primary flight training. Primary training consisted of a three-month course of 65 hours of flying instruction. As the United States prepared to enter World War II by expanding its number of flying squadrons, the number of contract primary schools increased.

According to the contract, the government supplied students with training aircraft, flying clothes, textbooks, and equipment. The Air Corps also put a detachment at each school to supervise training. The schools furnished instructors, training sites and facilities, aircraft maintenance, quarters, and mess halls. From the Air Corps, schools received a flat fee of $1,170 for each graduate and $18 per flying hour for students eliminated from training.

Following the fall of France in 1940, the Air Corps upped its pilot production goal to 7,000 per year. To meet that goal, the Air Corps increased the capacity of its schools and added more contract primary schools.

The vast majority of contract primary pilot training ended in the spring of 1944 as part of the rundown of Army pilot training. The ones remaining open ended their operations in October, 1945.

=== Lineage ===
- Established as 29th Flying Training Wing on 17 December 1942

Activated on 26 December 1942
Disbanded on 16 June 1946.

=== Assignments ===
- Army Air Forces Southeast Flying Training (later, AAF Eastern Flying) Command, 26 December 1942
- Western Flying Training Command, 15 December 1945 – 16 June 1946

=== Stations ===
- Moody Field, Georgia, 26 December 1942
- Napier Field, Alabama, 1 April 1945 – 16 June 1946

=== Training aircraft ===
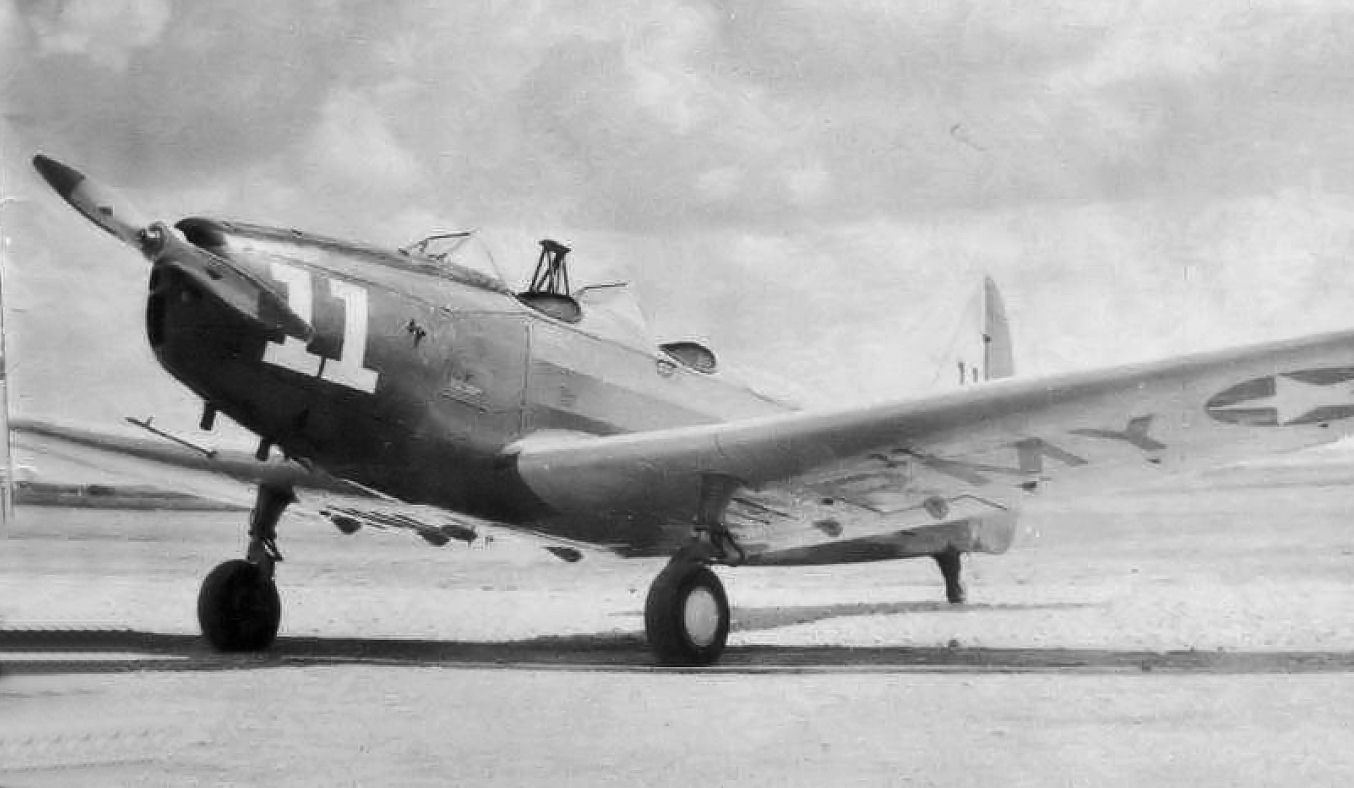
Fairchild PT-19 monoplane trainer

CPS Primary Trainers were primarily PT-17 Stearman biplanes and Fairchild PT-19s monoplanes, although a wide variety of other types could be found at the airfields. The Fairchild PT-19 aircraft also could have the student pilot covered with a hood for "Blind" instrument flying training.

Glider pilot schools used Aeronca TG-5As, Taylorcraft TG-6As, and Piper TG-8As unpowered glider conversions of powered light observation aircraft which had similar characteristics to the military gliders under development.

=== Contract Pilot Schools ===
Albany Army Airfield, Albany Georgia
52d Flying Training Detachment
Operated by: Darr Aero-Tech Primary Flying School
Opened: October 1940, Closed: November 1944 (PT-17)
Controlled four auxiliary airfields

Augustine Field, Madison, Mississippi
62d Flying Training Detachment
Operated by: Mississippi Institute of Aeronautics
Opened: 1941, Closed: June 1944 (PT-17, PT-19)
Was a sub-base to Jackson Army Airbase, CFS controlled three auxiliary airfields

Avon Park Municipal Airport, Avon Park, Florida
61st Flying Training Detachment
Operated by: Lodwick Aviation Military Academy
Opened: October 1941, Closed: June 1944 (PT-17)
Controlled four auxiliary airfields

Carlstrom Field, Arcadia, Florida
53d Flying Training Detachment
2148th Army Air Forces Base Unit (Contract Pilot School, Primary), April 1944
Operated by: Embry-Riddle Company
Opened: June 1941, Closed: June 1945 (PT-17)
Controlled four auxiliary airfields (Joint with Dorr Field)

Chester Field, McBride, Missouri
74th Flying Training Detachment
Operated by: Anderson Air Activities
Opened: June 1943, Closed: March 1944 (PT-17)

Decatur Airport, Decatur, Alabama
65th Flying Training Detachment
Operated by: Southern Regional Airways, Inc
Opened: October 1941, Closed: September 1945 (PT-17, PT-19)
Controlled five auxiliary airfields

Douglas Airport, Douglas, Georgia
63d Flying Training Detachment
Operated by: South Georgia College
Opened: May 1941, Closed: December 1944 (PT-17)
Controlled four auxiliary airfields

Dorr Field, Arcadia, Florida
54th Flying Training Detachment
Operated by: Embry-Riddle Company
Opened: October 1941, Closed: October 1944 (PT-17, PT-19)
Controlled four auxiliary airfields (Joint with Carlstrom Field)

Fletcher Field, Clarksdale, Mississippi
69th Flying Training Detachment
Operated by: Clarksdale School of Aviation
Opened: August 1942, Closed: August 1944 (PT-17, PT-19, PT-23)
Controlled two auxiliary airfields

Harrell Field, Camden, Arkansas
59th Flying Training Detachment
Operated by: Wiggings-Marden Aero Corp
Opened: August 1942, Closed: April 1944 (PT-17, PT-19)
Controlled two auxiliary airfields

Harris Army Airfield, Cape Giardeau, Missouri
73d Flying Training Detachment
Operated by: Cape Institute of Aeronautics, Inc
Opened: January 1943, Closed: March 1944 (PT-18, PT-19, PT-23)
Controlled three auxiliary airfields

Hawthorne School of Aeronautics, Orangeburg, South Carolina
58th Flying Training Detachment
2162d Army Air Forces Base Unit (Contract Pilot School, Primary), April 1944
Operated by: Hawthorne School of Aeronautics
Opened: October 1941, Closed: November 1945 (PT-18, PT-19, PT-23)
Also conducted Free French Air Force pilot training
Controlled three auxiliary airfields

Lodwick Field, Lakeland, Florida
61st Flying Training Detachment
2160th Army Air Forces Base Unit (Contract Pilot School, Primary), April 1944
Operated by: Lodwick School of Aeronautics
Opened: September 1940, Closed: August 1945 (PT-17)
Controlled seven auxiliary airfields

Lafayette Airport, Lafayette, Louisiana
70th Flying Training Detachment
Lafayette School of Aeronautics
Opened: September 1941, Closed: April 1944 (PT-17, PT-19)
Controlled four auxiliary airfields

McKellar Field, Jackson, Tennessee
68th Flying Training Detachment
Operated by: Georgia Air Services, Incorporated
Opened: July 1942, Closed: October 1944 (PT-17, PT-19, PT-23, PT-27)

Moton Field, Tuskegee, Alabama
66th Flying Training Detachment
2564th Army Air Forces Base Unit (Contract Pilot School, Primary) (Colored), April 1944
Operated by: Tuskegee Institute
Opened: June 1941, Closed: October 1945 (PT-13, PT-14, PT-17)
Controlled two auxiliary airfields

Palmer Field, Bennettsville, South Carolina
53d Flying Training Detachment
Operated by: Georgia Air Service, Incorporated and Southeastern Air Service, Incorporated
Opened: October 1941, Closed: October 1944 (PT-17)

Souther Field, Americus, Georgia
56th Flying Training Detachment
Operated by: Graham Aviation Co.
Opened: February 1941, Closed: October 1944 (PT-17)

Taylor Field, Ocala, Florida
57th Flying Training Detachment
Operated by: Greenville Aviation School
Opened: December 1941, Closed: September 1944 (PT-17)

Thompson-Robbins Field, Helena, Arkansas
59th Flying Training Detachment
Operated by: Helena Aerotech
Opened: October 1941, Closed: August 1944 (PT-17, PT-19, PT-23)
Controlled five auxiliary airfields

Van de Graaff Field, Tuscaloosa, Alabama
51st Flying Training Detachment
Operated by: Alabama Institute of Aeronautics, Inc
Opened: September 1939, Closed: August 1944 (PT-11, PT-17, PT-19)
Also conducted Free French Air Force pilot training
Controlled five auxiliary airfields

Embry Riddle Aeronautical Institute, Union City, Tennessee
67th Flying Training Detachment
Operated by: Riddle-McKay Company of Tennessee and Riddle Aeronautical Institute
Opened: August 1943, Closed: April 1944 (PT-17, PT-19, PT-23, PT-27)
Controlled three auxiliary airfields

Woodward Field, Camden, South Carolina
64th Flying Training Detachment
Operated by: Southern Aviation School
Opened: April 1941, Closed: August 1944 (PT-17)
Controlled two auxiliary airfields

=== Contract Glider Pilot Schools ===
Antigo Airport, Antigo, Wisconsin
14th Glider Training Detachment
Pre-Glider/Primary Training School (TG-8A)
Operated by: Anderson Air Activities

Bates Field, Mobile Alabama
18th Glider Training Detachment
Basic Glider Training School (TG-2, TG-4A, TG-5, TG-8A)
Operated by: Mobile Area Soaring Corp.

Greenville Municipal Airport, Greenville, South Carolina
48th Glider Training Detachment
Basic/Advanced Glider Training School (TG-8A, CG-4A)
Operated by: Southern Airways, Inc.

Grand Forks Airport, Grand Forks, North Dakota
24th Glider Training Detachment (TG-8A)
Pre-Glider/Primary Training School
Operated by: Jolly Flying Service

Kirkwood Field, Crookston, Minnesota
33D Glider Training Detachment
Pre-Glider/Primary Training School (TG-8A)
Operated by: L. Millar-Wittig

Lobb Field, Rochester, Minnesota
32d Glider Training Detachment
Pre-Glider/Primary Training School (TG-6A)
Operated by: Fontana School of Aeronautics

Stillwater Airport, Stillwater, Minnesota
34th Glider Training Detachment
Pre-Glider/Primary Training School (TG-6A)
Operated by: North Aviation Company

Monticello Field, Monticello, Minnesota
35th Glider Training Detachment
Pre-Glider/Primary Training School (TG-6A)
Operated by: Hinck Flying Service, Inc.

== See also ==
Other Eastern Flying Training Command Flight Training Wings:

27th Flying Training Wing (World War II) Basic Flight Training
28th Flying Training Wing (World War II) Advanced Flight Training, Single Engine
30th Flying Training Wing (World War II) Advanced Flight Training, Two Engine
74th Flying Training Wing (U.S. Army Air Forces) Classification/Preflight/Specialized/Navigation
75th Flying Training Wing (U.S. Army Air Forces) Gunnery
76th Flying Training Wing (U.S. Army Air Forces) Specialized Four-Engine Training
