= Marion Carlstrom =

American aviator

Marion Virginia Carlstrom Trick
- Born: Marion Virginia Carlstrom; May 20, 1919; Jackson County, Colorado
- Died: January 14, 2010 (aged 90)
- Education: Bennington College
- Known for: Aviator, rancher
- Spouse: Carl Trick
- Parent(s): Carl Carlstrom, Marion Virginia Sharp

Marion Virginia Carlstrom Trick (May 20, 1919 – January 14, 2010) was the first woman from Colorado to join the Women Airforce Service Pilots and the second woman in Peru to receive a pilot's license.

Carlstrom was born May 20, 1919, in Jackson County, Colorado. Her father, Carl Carlstrom, was a Swedish immigrant who worked as a civilian flight instructor. Carl Carlstrom's brother, Victor Carlstrom, served as a first lieutenant in the United States Air Corps during World War I and made the first nonstop flight from New York City to Chicago. Marion Carlstrom "grew up looking at the pictures and reading the clippings" about her uncle, and was determined to become a pilot.

Carlstrom graduated from high school at 16 and went on to attend the University of Denver. She later attended Bennington College in Vermont on a full-ride scholarship. There, she studied archaeology and South American literature.

In 1940, Carlstrom traveled to Lima, Peru as a foreign exchange student at the National University of San Marcos. A member of her host family worked for the Peruvian Air Corps, and Carlstrom learned that the Corps offered free flying lessons if students paid for their own fuel. To cover the cost, she became a secretary for the commercial attaché at the United States Embassy in Lima. She was the second woman in Peru to become a licensed pilot and received a trophy from President Manuel Prado Ugarteche. Carlstrom took part in air races over the mountains of Peru, flying over the Andes at altitudes of 18,000 feet.

During World War II, Carlstrom joined the Women Airforce Service Pilots, where she ferried "mainly pursuit aircraft". She served in the Women Airforce Service Pilots (WASP) for twenty-two months and was one of the few Women Airforce Service Pilots to fly a Lockheed P-38 Lightning airplane. She was stationed at Love Field in Texas. There, she met and married Carl Trick, a U.S. Army Major.

After the war, Carlstrom and her husband moved to her father's ranch in the North Park basin of Colorado, later named the North Park Angus Ranch. They were credited with introducing Angus cattle to the basin and being the first ranchers in the basin to artificially inseminate their cattle. Carlstrom flew occasionally in a friend's plane, but explained, "We were used to flying such great airplanes, and there was no way we could afford to fly planes like that." She looked back fondly on her piloting career:

"I think every child, no matter how much they love this country, love the ranching, should go out and know that it's a big world. Get their self-confidence, know what they can do. Then they can come back because they want to come back, not because it seemed the easiest thing to do, or because they were hesitant or afraid to try something else. This makes people strong."

In 1961, she was on an episode of Say When!! (game show), where she beat Mr. Mortensen, a tugboat deckhand. Carlstrom had two children, Carl and Christine. She died on January 14, 2010.
