= Hub Pruett =

American baseball player (1900-1982)

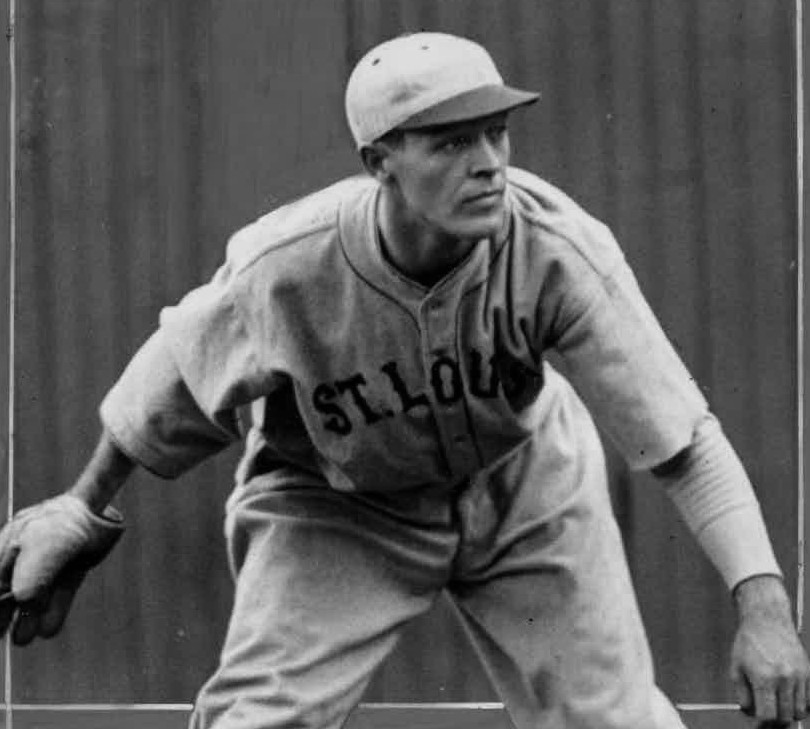
- Pitcher
- Born: September 1, 1900; Malden, Missouri, United States
- Died: January 28, 1982 (aged 81); Ladue, Missouri, United States
- Batted: Left Threw: Left

MLB debut
- April 26, 1922, for the St. Louis Browns

Last MLB appearance
- September 20, 1932, for the Boston Braves

MLB statistics
- Win–loss record: 29–48
- Earned run average: 4.63
- Strikeouts: 357
- Stats at Baseball Reference

Teams
- As player: St. Louis Browns (1922–1924); Philadelphia Phillies (1927–1928); New York Giants (1930); Boston Braves (1932)

Hubert Shelby "Hub" "Shucks" Pruett (September 1, 1900 in Malden, Missouri – January 28, 1982 in Ladue, Missouri), was a professional baseball left-handed pitcher in Major League Baseball from 1922 to 1932. He acquired the nickname "Shucks" because that was the strongest word in his vocabulary.

== Baseball career ==
Pruett played for the St. Louis Browns, Philadelphia Phillies, New York Giants, and Boston Braves.

Pruett's claim to fame was that he had a knack for getting out Babe Ruth. However, the fame may have been overstated because he was most successful doing so in his first year in the major leagues, and it was mentioned prominently in newspapers. As time went on, Ruth had more success, and even hit home runs against Pruett. Other than his statistics against Ruth, Pruett was an ordinary pitcher, with a career won-lost record of 29–48 and an earned run average of 4.63. Other pitchers also had better personal records against Ruth.

== Personal life ==
Pruett's father was a physician who died in a horse and buggy accident while making a house call, and Pruett was raised by an aunt. He became a medical student during his early years in baseball and used his baseball pay to finance his medical education. He graduated from the St. Louis University School of Medicine and became a practicing physician. His son Don and grandson Chris also became physicians. In 1948, several weeks before Ruth's death, Pruett was able to personally thank Ruth for this because he felt that his success against him was one of the main reasons he was kept on by the Browns and allowed him to save money to attend medical school. Ruth told Pruett, “If I helped you get through medical school, I’m glad of it.”

== Record vs. Babe Ruth ==
date	results of each of Babe Ruth's at bats in games during which both Pruett and Ruth appeared
May 22, 1922	strikeout, walk
June 10, 1922	did not face each other
June 12, 1922	strikeout, walk, strikeout, strikeout
July 12, 1922	groundout (pitcher to first), strikeout, strikeout, strikeout
August 25, 1922 (second game)	strikeout
September 17, 1922	walk, strikeout, homerun, single
May 16, 1923	strikeout
May 17, 1923	walk
May 19, 1923	homerun, strikeout, sacrifice, strikeout, groundout
June 14, 1923	single, strikeout, walk, walk
July 8, 1923	walk, unknown type of out
July 9, 1923	did not face each other
August 7, 1923	did not face each other
June 10, 1924	groundout
August 1, 1924	bunt single
August 2, 1924	single, single

For his career Babe Ruth batted .280/.438/.520 with 2 HRs and 13 strikeouts in 32 plate appearances against Shucks. For the timeframe Babe Ruth had an OPS of 1.233, so even allowing for the Babe reaching base 7 of their last 10 meetings Shucks did have greater than average success vs. Ruth.
