= Lobb Field =

- IATA: none; ICAO: none

Summary
- Location: Rochester, Minnesota
- Opened: 1929
- Closed: 1961
- Coordinates: 43°59′51″N 92°27′04″W
- Interactive map of Lobb Field

Lobb Field is a former airport and military airfield in Rochester, Minnesota, United States.

== History ==
Lobb Field, the original airport for Rochester, was established in 1928 by the Mayo Foundation to get patients to the Mayo Clinic. It was in what is now South-East Rochester and occupied 285 acres (115 ha).

Plans for the airport were announced on 13 July 1928, the day that scheduled air service to Rochester began. Starting on that date, Jefferson Airways operated two Ford Tri-motor flights per day between Rochester and St. Paul using the fair grounds to land until the airport was able to open.

The following year the airport was dedicated, and the Rochester Airport Company was founded as a subsidiary of the Mayo Foundation. Northwest Airways, a predecessor to Northwest Airlines and Delta Air Lines, began running Ford Trimotors to Rochester from its hub in St. Paul. Rochester was one of the first destinations from the Twin Cities in Northwest's history, behind Chicago, Winnipeg, Green Bay, and Fargo.

In 1940 the runways were paved and more land was acquired, bringing the airport's area to 370 acres (1.5 km^{2}). During World War II the Army Air Corps conducted training operations from the airport. The Fontana School of Aeronautics provided contract glider training to the United States Army Air Forces between 1942 and 1944, using primarily Douglas C-47s and Waco CG-4 gliders. There may have been two auxiliary landing fields in this service. The mission of the school was to train glider pilot students in proficiency in operation of gliders in various types of towed and soaring flight, both day and night, and in servicing of gliders in the field.

In 1945 the Mayo Foundation gave the airport to the city of Rochester, but the Rochester Airport Company continued to operate the field under an agreement with the city. The airport was renamed Lobb Field in 1952. Airlines in 1941 were Northwest and Mid-Continent (later merged into Braniff Airways); Western arrived in 1947 and left in 1959.Ozark Airlines arrived in 1957.

The January 1960 chart shows three runways: 4210-foot runway 2, 4470-foot runway 13, and 4050-foot runway 17.

In 1960 it was decided to replace Lobb Field with a new airport southwest of town because it could not be expanded to allow larger airliners and was too close to the urban area of Rochester. The original Rochester Airport closed in 1961.

The former airport has been redeveloped as part of the Rochester urban area called Meadow Park, including Ben Franklin Elementary School. Little or no evidence of the airport's existence remains.

== See also ==
- Minnesota World War II Army Airfields
- 29th Flying Training Wing (World War II)
