= Rochester International Airport =

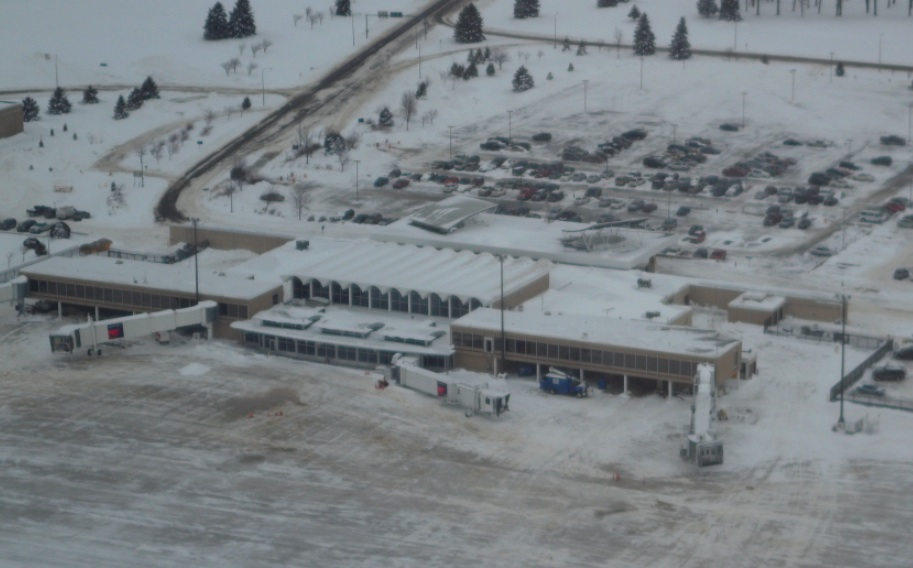
- IATA: RST; ICAO: KRST; FAA LID: RST

Summary
- Airport type: Public
- Owner: City of Rochester
- Operator: Rochester Airport Company
- Location: Rochester, Minnesota
- Elevation AMSL: 1,317 ft (401 m)
- Coordinates: 43°54′30″N 92°30′00″W
- Website: www.flyrst.com

Maps
- FAA diagram

- Location within Minnesota Location within the United States

Runways
Direction	Length		Surface
Direction	ft	m	Surface
13/31	9,034	2,754	Concrete
3/21	7,301	2,225	Concrete

Statistics (2021)
- Passengers (2019): 359,470
- Aircraft operations (2021): 56,105
- Based aircraft (2021): 70
- Source: Bureau of Transportation Statistics, Federal Aviation Administration

Rochester International Airport (IATA: RST, ICAO: KRST, FAA LID: RST) is an international airport located seven miles (11 km) south of downtown Rochester in Olmsted County, Minnesota. It is the second-busiest airport in Minnesota. Its name used to be "Rochester Municipal Airport", before adding customs and immigration facilities specifically for Mayo Clinic purposes in 1995.

The airport covers 2,400 acres (9.7 km^{2}) and has two concrete runways: 9,034 ft × 150 ft (2,754 m × 46 m) runway 13/31 and 7,301 ft × 150 ft (2,225 m × 46 m) runway 3/21.

Airline service is currently provided by American Airlines and Delta Air Lines. The airport has a large FedEx Express freight terminal and a general aviation terminal.

== History ==
The original Rochester airport was founded in 1928 by the Mayo Foundation to bring patients to Mayo Clinic. It was in what is now southeast Rochester and occupied 285 acres (1.15 km^{2}). The following year "Rochester Airport" was dedicated, and the Rochester Airport Company was founded as a subsidiary of the Mayo Foundation. Northwest Airlines began running Ford Trimotors to Rochester from St. Paul. Rochester was one of the first destinations from the Twin Cities in Northwest Airlines history, behind Chicago, Winnipeg, Green Bay, and Fargo.

In 1940, the runways were paved and more land was acquired, bringing the airport's area to 370 acres (1.5 km^{2}). During World War II, the Army Air Corps conducted training operations from the airport. In 1945, the Mayo Foundation gave the airport to the city of Rochester, but the Rochester Airport Company continued to operate the field under an agreement with the city. The airport was renamed Lobb Field in 1952. In 1960, it was decided to replace Lobb Field with a new airport southwest of town because it could not be expanded to allow larger airliners and was too close to the urban area of Rochester. The original Rochester Airport closed in 1961.

In 1960, Rochester Municipal Airport opened at its current location 7 miles (11 km) south of downtown Rochester; in 1965, runway 13 was 6400 feet and runway 2 was 4000 feet. Northwest and Braniff moved to the new airport in 1960, but Ozark's DC-3s stayed at Lobb until 1961; North Central Airlines arrived in 1968, and Braniff left around the same time. The first jets were Northwest 727s in 1965.

American Airlines began service to O'Hare International Airport in 1988. 1995 saw the addition of a United States Customs Service post and it became the Rochester International Airport. Trans World Airlines operated flights to St. Louis in early-2001, but these routes were dropped very soon due to the merger with American Airlines. On September 15, 2005, the primary runway was lengthened from 7,533' to 9,034 following a three-month closure for renovations; runway centerline and touchdown zone lighting were added. The change was made to allow large wide body aircraft, which had been weight-restricted upon departure.

In 1970, Imperial Airways offered scheduled helicopter service to Minneapolis–Saint Paul International Airport. On December 4, 1970, Imperial Airways announced it was canceling its scheduled helicopter flights in Minnesota, including from Minneapolis–St. Paul to Rochester.

In 2020, the airport received a $2,479,991 CARES Act award.

During the week of May 1, 2023, workers at the airport worked to rename runway 2/20 to 3/21. The renaming was caused by the magnetic north pole moving enough to change the orientation of the runway.

=== 2009 tarmac stranding incident ===
The Rochester International Airport was the site of the six-hour 2009 tarmac stranding incident that made international news and resulted in the first fines ever imposed on airline carriers by the United States Department of Transportation for stranding passengers on a tarmac.

=== Future ===
In March 2019, plans for construction of an additional gate and jet bridge were announced. The proposal for the addition came after a large increase in passengers the previous year and congestion. In July 2019, the Rochester Airport Commission began accepting bids for the jet bridge project. The commission also discussed repaving parts of runway 02/20 as well as additional dining and shopping options in the terminal. At the end of July 2019, the airport received $3.3 million in federal grants to improvements, including the jet bridge project and runway reconstruction.

In February 2020, the airport was awarded $750,000 by the United States Department of Transportation for attracting new service, with the federal grant's stated purpose being "revenue guarantee and marketing program to attract new service to Denver on United Airlines." Airport directors noted that the grant does not guarantee the new destination yet and also does not exclude possible other destinations. In August 2022, the airport was awarded another $850,000 in a federal airport grant. This new grant is allowing for potential flights to Dallas on American Airlines.

== Airlines and destinations ==
=== Passenger ===
Airlines	Destinations
American Eagle	Chicago–O'Hare
Delta Connection	Minneapolis/St. Paul

=== Cargo ===
Airlines	Destinations
FedEx Express	Memphis

Destinations map
Destinations from Rochester International Airport
Red = Year-round destination
Green = Seasonal destination

Airport directors are trying to get more service into Rochester. The directors have contacted two of the airline providers, American and Delta, about adding more destinations, and have also contacted United and Frontier, to bring new nonstop destinations. On February 26, 2017, United announced it was adding three daily flights to Chicago–O'Hare beginning June 8. The new flight was to compete with existing service from American Airlines. United later added service to Denver however these services proved unsuccessful in the wake of the COVID-19 pandemic and were discontinued in late 2021 as United exited the Rochester market entirely.

In August 2012, just days after Allegiant Air announced flights between Rochester and Phoenix (Allegiant Air has since dropped its Rochester service altogether), the United States Department of Transportation gave the airport $500,000 and the city of Rochester gave the airport $250,000 to help recruit more airlines and non-stop destinations.

On May 31, 2018, Elite Airways announced that they would be launching service direct to Phoenix, Arizona, and St. Augustine, Florida, starting in July 2018. This service was to allow Mayo Clinic staff, patients, and families to easily move back and forth between Mayo's headquarters in Rochester and its other main facilities in the Phoenix and Jacksonville metropolitan areas. They ended the service on August 22, 2018, citing low bookings.

== Statistics ==
=== Top Destinations ===
Top domestic routes from RST (September 2025 – August 2026)
Rank	City	Passengers	Carrier
1	Minneapolis/St. Paul, MN	60,400	Delta
2	Chicago–O'Hare, IL	48,030	American

=== Airline market share ===
Largest airlines at RST (September 2025 – August 2026)
Rank	Airline	Passengers	Share
1	Endeavor Air	78,900	36.85%
2	SkyWest Airlines	78,460	36.65%
3	Envoy Air	56,740	26.5%

== General aviation facilities ==
Signature Aviation is the provider of fixed-base operator services, including a passenger terminal. Aircraft rental and flight instruction at are available at Great Planes Aviation. The Airport also has T-hangers available for lease. It is home to the Southeastern Minnesota Flying Club.

== Ground transportation ==
Transportation to and from Rochester International Airport is available via shuttle service, taxi, rental car, and Uber or Lyft. Rochester Public Transit does not serve the airport.

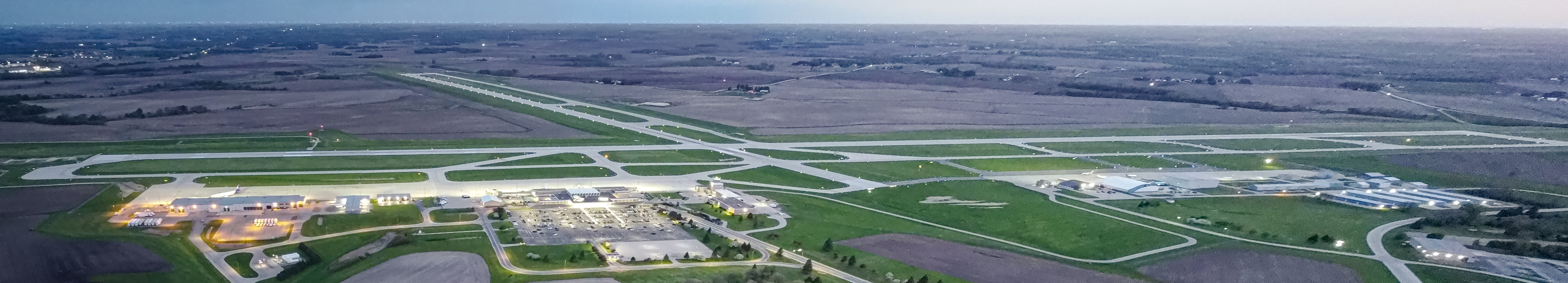

== Accidents near RST ==
- On December 8, 1985, a Learjet 35 operated by Corporate Air Inc, a training flight, rolled inverted and crashed after a missed approach. All three occupants died.
