= Missouri World War II Army Airfields =

Missouri World War II Army Airfields
- Part of World War II

Site information
- Type: Army Airfields

Location
- Map Of Missouri World War II Army Airfields

Site history
- Built: 1940-1944
- In use: 1940-present

During World War II, the United States Army Air Forces (USAAF) established numerous airfields in Missouri for training pilots and aircrews of USAAF fighters and bombers.

Most of these airfields were under the command of First Air Force or the Army Air Forces Training Command (AAFTC). However other USAAF commands (Air Technical Service Command (ATSC); Air Transport Command (ATC) or Troop Carrier Command) also had a significant number of airfields.

It is still possible to find remnants of these wartime airfields. Many were converted into municipal airports, some were returned to agriculture and several were retained as United States Air Force installations and were front-line bases during the Cold War. Hundreds of the temporary buildings that were used survive today, and are being used for other purposes.

== Major Airfields ==
Army Air Force Training Command

- Chester Army Airfield, Perryville

Contract flying training
Now: Perryville Municipal Airport (IATA: K02)

- Harris Army Airfield, Cape Girardeau

Contract flying training
Now: Cape Girardeau Regional Airport
(IATA: CGI, ICAO: KCGI)

- Harvey Parks Airport, Sikeston

Contract flying training
Now: Sikeston Memorial Municipal Airport
(IATA: SIK, ICAO: KSIK)

Troop Carrier Command

- Malden Army Airfield, Malden

445th Army Air Force Base Unit
Was: Malden Air Base (1951–1960)
USAF Contract Flight Training
Now: Malden Regional Airport (IATA: MAW, ICAO: KMAW)

- Sedalia Army Airfield, Knob Noster

I Troop Carrier Command
405th Army Air Force Base Unit
Was: Sedalia Air Force Auxiliary Field (1948–1951)
Was: Sedalia Air Force Base (1951–1955)
Now: Whiteman Air Force Base (1955–Pres)

- Vichy Army Airfield, Vichy

Sub-base of Sedalia AAF
Now: Rolla National Airport (IATA: VIH, ICAO: KVIH)

- Grandview Airport, Belton (1944–1945)

Was: Grandview Air Force Base (1952–1957)
Was: Richards-Gebaur Air Force Base {Active USAF control} (1957–1976)
Was: Richards-Gebaur Air Force Base then Richards-Gebaur Air Reserve Station {AFRES/AFRC control} and
Richards-Gebaur Memorial Airport (1976–1999)
(IATA: GVW, ICAO: KGVW)
Closed 1999. Now non-aviation use as Kansas City SmartPort.

- Forney Army Airfield, Fort Leonard Wood

Support airfield for Ft. Leonard Wood
Now: Waynesville Regional Airport at Forney Field
(IATA: TBN, ICAO: KTBN)

Air Technical Service Command

- Lambert Field, St. Louis

Joint use USAAF/US Navy/Civil Airport
Now: Lambert-St. Louis International Airport
(IATA: STL, ICAO: KSTL)

Air Transport Command

- Rosencrans Field Army Airfield, St. Joseph

406th Army Air Force Base Unit
Now: Rosecrans Air National Guard Base
(IATA: STJ, ICAO: KSTJ)

- Kansas City Apt, Kansas City

Joint use USAAF/Civil Airport
Now: Charles B. Wheeler Downtown Airport
(IATA: MKC, ICAO: KMKC)
