= Malden, Missouri =

City in southeastern Missouri

Malden
- City
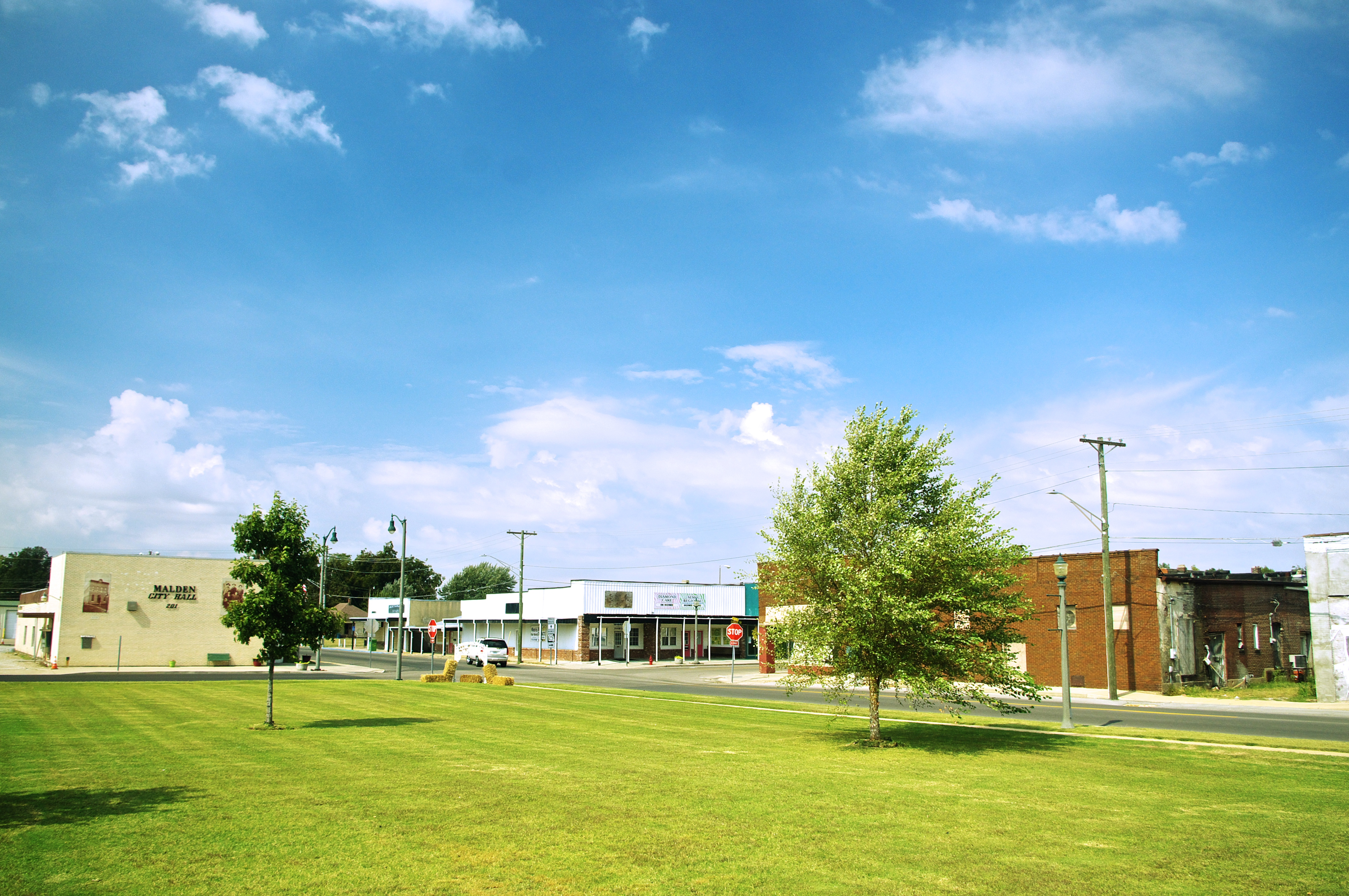
- Malden viewed from Cotton Belt Park

- Location of Malden, Missouri
- Coordinates: 36°36′02″N 89°59′51″W
- Country: United States
- State: Missouri
- County: Dunklin
- Established: 1887

Area
  - Total: 8.32 sq mi (21.55 km^{2})
  - Land: 8.32 sq mi (21.55 km^{2})
  - Water: 0 sq mi (0.00 km^{2})
- Elevation: 295 ft (90 m)

Population (2020)
  - Total: 3,706
  - Density: 445.4/sq mi (171.97/km^{2})
- Time zone: UTC-6 (Central (CST))
  - Summer (DST): UTC-5 (CDT)
- ZIP code: 63863
- Area code: 573
- FIPS code: 29-45614
- GNIS feature ID: 2395822
- Website: maldenmo.com

Malden is a city in the northeast corner of Dunklin County, Missouri, United States, located near the intersection of Missouri Route 25 and U.S. Route 62. The population was 3,706 at the 2020 census. Malden is within Missouri's 8th congressional district.

== History ==
Malden was platted in 1877 by a railroad official. Some say the community has the name of Colonel T. H. Mauldin, a county judge, while others believe the name is a transfer from Malden, Massachusetts. A post office called Malden has been in operation since 1877.

On February 24, 2018, an EF2 Tornado tracked around 40 miles from Kobel, Arkansas, before slamming into the bottom of Malden (Spoonerville) right before the end of its path, then moving into the corner of the downtown area before dissipating a quarter mile away from the 4-way division between Malden, Bernie, Clarkton, and Risco, it injured 5 people (4 in Malden, 1 in Kobel, Arkansas), and killed 1 person (1 in Kobel, Arkansas). It caused EF2 level damage, peaking at 115MPH at certain parts of Spoonerville and Downtown, hitting downtown's rundown Dixie: Auto Sales at near-EF2 strength and imploding mobile homes at EF2 strength in Spoonerville. It is the only tornado to ever strike Malden, Missouri ever since records began documentation, also by default making it the strongest to ever strike Malden and the most recent tornado to ever strike Malden as well.

== Geography ==
Malden is located in the Missouri Bootheel and the New Madrid Seismic Zone, approximately 23 miles (37 km) west of New Madrid and the Mississippi River meander around the Kentucky Bend.

Malden is located along the Crowley's Ridge Parkway.

According to the United States Census Bureau, the city has a total area of 7.53 square miles (19.50 km^{2}), all land.

== Demographics ==
Historical population
Census	Pop.	Note	%±
1880	215		—
1890	943		338.6%
1900	1,462		55.0%
1910	2,116		44.7%
1920	2,098		−0.9%
1930	2,025		−3.5%
1940	2,673		32.0%
1950	3,396		27.0%
1960	5,007		47.4%
1970	5,374		7.3%
1980	6,096		13.4%
1990	5,123		−16.0%
2000	4,782		−6.7%
2010	4,275		−10.6%
2020	3,706		−13.3%
U.S. Decennial Census

=== 2020 census ===
As of the 2020 census, Malden had a population of 3,706. The median age was 41.0 years. 25.2% of residents were under the age of 18 and 19.8% of residents were 65 years of age or older. For every 100 females there were 88.2 males, and for every 100 females age 18 and over there were 83.0 males age 18 and over.

0.0% of residents lived in urban areas, while 100.0% lived in rural areas.

There were 1,583 households in Malden, of which 27.4% had children under the age of 18 living in them. Of all households, 32.3% were married-couple households, 20.7% were households with a male householder and no spouse or partner present, and 40.1% were households with a female householder and no spouse or partner present. About 36.3% of all households were made up of individuals and 17.2% had someone living alone who was 65 years of age or older.

There were 1,894 housing units, of which 16.4% were vacant. The homeowner vacancy rate was 4.1% and the rental vacancy rate was 10.1%.

Racial composition as of the 2020 census
Race	Number	Percent
White	2,435	65.7%
Black or African American	941	25.4%
American Indian and Alaska Native	21	0.6%
Asian	4	0.1%
Native Hawaiian and Other Pacific Islander	3	0.1%
Some other race	55	1.5%
Two or more races	247	6.7%
Hispanic or Latino (of any race)	98	2.6%

=== 2010 census ===
As of the census of 2010, there were 4,275 people, 1,780 households, and 1,109 families residing in the city. The population density was 567.7 inhabitants per square mile (219.2/km^{2}). There were 2,014 housing units at an average density of 267.5 per square mile (103.3/km^{2}). The racial makeup of the city was 71.35% White, 25.12% Black or African American, 0.28% Native American, 0.35% Asian, 0.94% from other races, and 1.96% from two or more races. Hispanic or Latino of any race were 1.92% of the population.

There were 1,780 households, of which 31.6% had children under the age of 18 living with them, 37.0% were married couples living together, 20.5% had a female householder with no husband present, 4.8% had a male householder with no wife present, and 37.7% were non-families. 32.6% of all households were made up of individuals, and 14% had someone living alone who was 65 years of age or older. The average household size was 2.34 and the average family size was 2.94.

The median age in the city was 39.4 years. 25.1% of residents were under the age of 18; 9.3% were between the ages of 18 and 24; 22.7% were from 25 to 44; 25.6% were from 45 to 64; and 17.2% were 65 years of age or older. The gender makeup of the city was 46.5% male and 53.5% female.

=== 2000 census ===
As of 2000 the median income for a household in the city was $22,910, and the median income for a family was $27,819. Males had a median income of $30,671 versus $16,920 for females. The per capita income for the city was $12,475. About 22.9% of families and 27.8% of the population were below the poverty line, including 37.4% of those under age 18 and 25.7% of those age 65 or over.

== Transportation ==
Malden has one of the largest general aviation airports in the State of Missouri. Malden is listed in the National Plan of Integrated Airport Systems, which identifies airports that are significant to national transportation. Malden's three 5,000-foot (1,500 m) runways can handle most corporate aircraft. The city also has the Dunklin County Transit Bus System which travels throughout the city and the surrounding area.

The Malden Municipal Airport was an Army airfield and then an Air Force base from 1942 to 1960, as operated by the military and then under civilian contracts. The airfield was used to train pilots to fight in World War II and the Korean War. The Malden Army Airfield Preservation Society (MAAPS) is an organization that works to preserve the past of the Malden Army Airfield. The MAAPS Military Museum is located in the airport's terminal building and MAAPS also maintains a Veterans Wall of Honor.

== Education ==
Almost all of it is in the Malden R-I School District.

The district is designated as a 3A designated school for athletics (2A for football). The mascot is the Green Wave, and its last state championship was 2007, when the school won its second consecutive Boys Track championship. The Malden Green Wave Football program competed in the state playoffs in 2010 and the boys baseball team were conference regular season champions and won a district title for the first time in 31 years in 2011. The Malden school system has been named one of the top 10% of American High Schools for 3 years running and ranked as the best school in southeast Missouri based on 2009-2010 Missouri Assessment Program test scores. The Malden School Board was recognized by the Missouri School Board's Association as its Outstanding Board of the Year in 2011. Malden has two satellite college campuses, one from Three Rivers Community College and another from Southeast Missouri State University.

A small piece of the city limits extends into the Clarkton C-4 School District.

Malden has a public library, a branch of the Dunklin County Library.

== Arts and culture ==
Malden is the home of the Bootheel Youth Museum. This is a hands-on activity-based museum for children. It has grown over the past few years and has had over 140,000 visitors. It is a resource for Malden school district as well as surround districts. The most recent addition is the Lewis and Clark site. The Museum was a National Award winner in 2012 and was named a top youth attraction in America.

Other attractions include:

- The Malden Historical Museum, which displays the history of Malden
- Malden Community Center
- Malden Veterans Wall of Honor

== Climate ==
Climate is characterized by relatively high temperatures and evenly distributed precipitation throughout the year. The Köppen Climate Classification subtype for this climate is "Cfa" (Humid Subtropical Climate).

Climate data for Malden Regional Airport, Missouri (1991–2020 normals, extremes 1960–present)
Month	Jan	Feb	Mar	Apr	May	Jun	Jul	Aug	Sep	Oct	Nov	Dec	Year
Record high °F (°C)	75 (24)	81 (27)	85 (29)	94 (34)	96 (36)	108 (42)	108 (42)	106 (41)	101 (38)	94 (34)	87 (31)	77 (25)	108 (42)
Mean daily maximum °F (°C)	45.5 (7.5)	50.7 (10.4)	60.6 (15.9)	71.4 (21.9)	80.9 (27.2)	89.8 (32.1)	92.2 (33.4)	91.0 (32.8)	84.9 (29.4)	74.2 (23.4)	60.0 (15.6)	48.9 (9.4)	70.8 (21.6)
Daily mean °F (°C)	36.4 (2.4)	40.5 (4.7)	49.4 (9.7)	59.8 (15.4)	69.7 (20.9)	78.7 (25.9)	81.6 (27.6)	79.9 (26.6)	72.8 (22.7)	61.4 (16.3)	49.1 (9.5)	39.7 (4.3)	59.9 (15.5)
Mean daily minimum °F (°C)	27.2 (−2.7)	30.2 (−1.0)	38.2 (3.4)	48.2 (9.0)	58.5 (14.7)	67.6 (19.8)	71.1 (21.7)	68.8 (20.4)	60.7 (15.9)	48.6 (9.2)	38.2 (3.4)	30.5 (−0.8)	49.0 (9.4)
Record low °F (°C)	−15 (−26)	−4 (−20)	1 (−17)	24 (−4)	35 (2)	45 (7)	52 (11)	47 (8)	36 (2)	23 (−5)	12 (−11)	−7 (−22)	−15 (−26)
Average precipitation inches (mm)	3.24 (82)	3.71 (94)	4.47 (114)	5.36 (136)	5.21 (132)	3.56 (90)	4.22 (107)	3.03 (77)	3.19 (81)	3.49 (89)	4.50 (114)	4.54 (115)	48.52 (1,232)
Average precipitation days (≥ 0.01 in)	7.8	8.4	10.6	9.4	9.8	7.9	7.7	6.7	7.1	7.4	8.3	8.6	99.7
Source: NOAA

== Notable people ==
- Narvel Felts, country music musician
- Derland Moore, NFL lineman
- Hub Pruett, MLB piticher
- George Richey, country music songwriter and producer
