= Cape Girardeau Regional Airport =

Cape Girardeau Regional Airport Harris Army Airfield
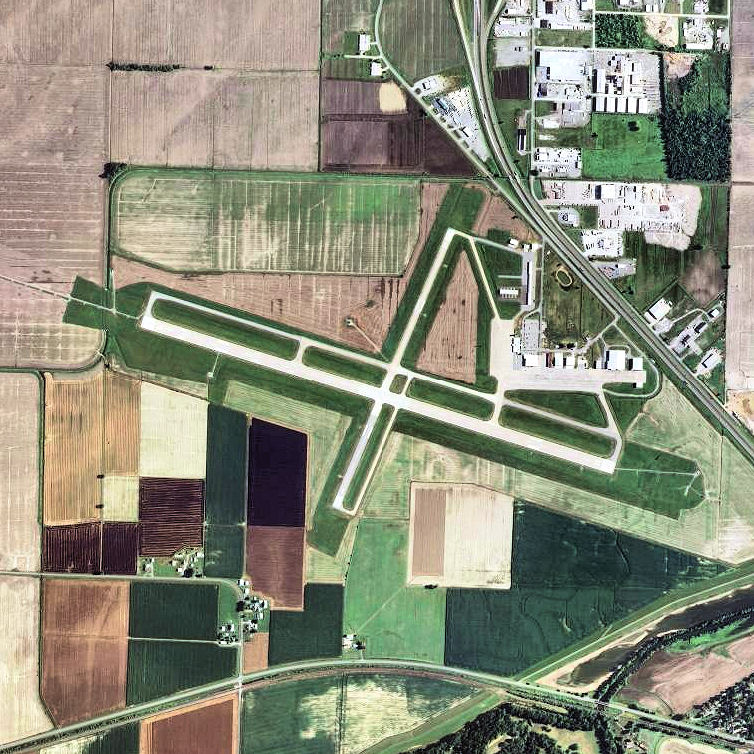
- USGS 2006 orthophoto
- IATA: CGI; ICAO: KCGI; FAA LID: CGI

Summary
- Airport type: Public
- Owner: City of Cape Girardeau
- Serves: Cape Girardeau, Missouri
- Location: Scott County, Missouri
- Elevation AMSL: 342 ft (104 m)
- Coordinates: 37°13′31″N 89°34′15″W
- Website: www.CapeAirport.com

Map
- Location of airport in Missouri CGI (the United States)

Runways
Direction	Length		Surface
Direction	ft	m	Surface
10/28	6,500	1,981	Concrete
2/20	3,997	1,218	Asphalt/concrete

Statistics
- Aircraft operations (2018): 29,106
- Based aircraft (2019): 57
- Departing passengers (12 months ending Sept. 2018): 7,650
- Source: Federal Aviation Administration

Cape Girardeau Regional Airport (IATA: CGI, ICAO: KCGI, FAA LID: CGI) is a city owned public use airport in Scott County, Missouri, United States. It is located five nautical miles (6 mi, 9 km) southwest of the central business district of Cape Girardeau, a city in Cape Girardeau County, Missouri, United States. The airport is used for general aviation, and has scheduled service by Contour Airlines with subsidized Essential Air Service program flights to Chicago O’Hare Airport.

It is included in the National Plan of Integrated Airport Systems for 2017–2021, which categorized it as a commercial service - nonprimary airport based on passenger enplanements (the commercial service category requires at least 2,500 enplanements per year).

== Facilities and aircraft ==
Cape Girardeau Regional Airport covers an area of 557 acres (225 ha) at an elevation of 342 feet (104 m) above mean sea level. It has two runways: 10/28 is 6,500 by 150 feet (1,981 x 46 m) with a concrete surface; 2/20 is 3,997 by 100 feet (1,218 x 30 m) with an asphalt/concrete surface.

For the 12-month period ending September 30, 2018, the airport had 29,106 aircraft operations, an average of 80 per day: 91% general aviation, 5% scheduled commercial, 3% air taxi and 1% military. In January 2019, there were 57 aircraft based at this airport: 48 single-engine, 5 multi-engine, 2 jet and 2 helicopter.

== Airline and destinations ==
=== Passenger ===
Airlines	Destinations	Refs.
Contour Airlines	Chicago–O'Hare, Dallas/Fort Worth; Seasonal: Orlando/Sanford (begins December 16, 2026), Pensacola	

== History ==
Opened in 1943, the airport was constructed by the United States Army Air Forces. Known as Harris Army Airfield, the airfield was a primary (stage 1) pilot training airfield assigned to AAF Flying Training Command, Southeast Training Center (later Eastern Flying Training Command). It was operated under contract to Cape Institute of Aeronautics, Inc., with the civil instructors under the USAAF 73d Flying Training Detachment. Fairchild PT-19s were the primary trainer at the airfield.

Contract flying training was short at the airfield, the school closing during the late summer of 1944 with the draw down of AAFTC's pilot training program. The airfield was turned over to civil control at the end of the war though the War Assets Administration (WAA).

In 1975 the City of Cape Girardeau was considering annexing the airport and adjacent areas. At the time, the Illmo-Scott City R-1 School District contained the airport and surrounding businesses. The school district administration feared that if the city government annexed the airport, then the airport area would also be transferred from the Illmo-Scott City school district to the Cape Girardeau School District, and in turn the Illmo-Scott City district would have reduced tax revenue.

In 2018, Air Force One landed here.

== Statistics ==
=== Top destinations ===
Busiest domestic routes from CGI (September 2025 – August 2026)
Rank	Airport	Passengers	Carriers
1	Chicago–O'Hare, Illinois	7,680	Contour
2	Dallas/Fort Worth, Texas	4,400	Contour
3	Pensacola, Florida	800	Contour

== See also ==
- List of airports in Missouri
- Missouri World War II Army Airfields
- 29th Flying Training Wing (World War II)

== Other sources ==
- This article incorporates public domain material from the Air Force Historical Research Agency
- Manning, Thomas A. (2005), History of Air Education and Training Command, 1942–2002. Office of History and Research, Headquarters, AETC, Randolph AFB, Texas OCLC 71006954, 29991467
- Shaw, Frederick J. (2004), Locating Air Force Base Sites, History’s Legacy, Air Force History and Museums Program, United States Air Force, Washington DC. OCLC 57007862, 1050653629
- Essential Air Service documents (Docket OST-1996-1559) from the U.S. Department of Transportation:
  - Order 2005-6-14: re-selecting RegionsAir, Inc. d/b/a American Connection, formerly known as Corporate Airlines, to provide subsidized essential air service (EAS) at each of the above communities (Burlington, IA; Cape Girardeau, MO; Ft. Leonard Wood, MO; Jackson, TN; Marion/Herrin, IL; Owensboro, KY; Kirksville, MO) for a new two-year period from June 1, 2005, through May 31, 2007, for a combined annual subsidy of $7,306,249. Also by this order, the Department is terminating the show-cause proceeding tentatively terminating subsidy at Kirksville, Missouri, as RegionsAir's selected proposal is below the $200-per-passenger cap.
  - Order 2007-3-5: selecting Big Sky Transportation Co., d/b/a Big Sky Airlines, and Great Lakes Aviation, Ltd. to provide subsidized essential air service (EAS) at the above communities (Burlington, IA; Cape Girardeau, MO; Fort Leonard Wood, MO; Jackson, TN; Marion/Herrin, IL, Owensboro, KY) for the two-year period from June 1, 2007, through May 31, 2009, using 19-seat Beech 1900D turboprop aircraft as follows: Big Sky at Cape Girardeau, Jackson, and Owensboro for a combined annual subsidy of $3,247,440; and Great Lakes at Burlington, Fort Leonard Wood, and Marion/Herrin for a combined annual subsidy of $2,590,461.
  - Order 2008-2-1: selecting Great Lakes Aviation, Ltd. to provide subsidized essential air service at Cape Girardeau, Missouri and Jackson, Tennessee and Owensboro, Kentucky for the two-year period beginning when the carrier starts full EAS at all three communities.
  - Order 2009-10-13: selecting Hyannis Air Service, Inc. d/b/a Cape Air, to provide subsidized essential air service (EAS) at Marion/Herrin, Quincy, and Cape Girardeau, for a two-year period beginning when Cape Air inaugurates full EAS at each of the three communities and ending at the close of the 24th month thereafter, at a combined annual subsidy rate of $5,469,768 ($2,053,783 for Marion/Herrin, $1,946,270 for Quincy, and $1,469,715 for Cape Girardeau). The Department is selecting Multi-Aero, Inc. d/b/a Air Choice One to provide subsidized EAS at Decatur, Illinois, and Burlington, Iowa, for a two-year period beginning when it inaugurates full EAS and ending at the close of the 24th month thereafter, at a combined annual subsidy of $5,253,644 ($3,082,403 for Decatur and $2,171,241 for Burlington). The Department is selecting Great Lakes Aviation, Ltd. (Great Lakes) to provide subsidized EAS at Fort Leonard Wood, Missouri, for the two-year period from November 1, 2009, through October 31, 2011, at an annual subsidy of $1,292,906.
  - Order 2011-4-12: re-selecting Hyannis Air Service, Inc. d/b/a Cape Air, to provide essential air service (EAS) at Marion/Herrin, Illinois (Marion) and Quincy, Illinois/Hannibal, Missouri (Quincy), and Cape Girardeau/Sikeston, Missouri (Cape Girardeau), for the four-year period from December 1, 2011, through November 30, 2015, for a combined annual subsidy rate of $5,689,438 ($2,104,616 for Marion, $1,956,856 for Quincy, and $1,627,966 for Cape Girardeau). Marion and Quincy will receive 36 weekly round trips and Cape Girardeau will receive 24 weekly round trips. All service will operate nonstop to/from Lambert-St. Louis International Airport (St. Louis) using eight- or nine-passenger Cessna 402 aircraft.
