= Malden Regional Airport =

Airport in Dunkin County, Missouri

Malden Regional Airport (former Malden Air Base)
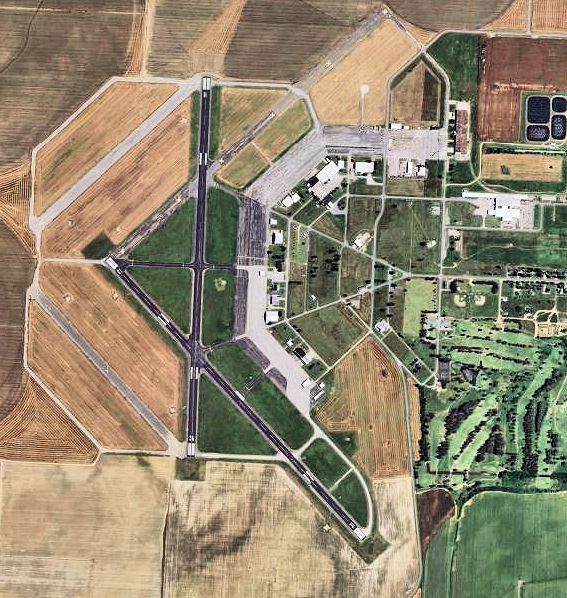
- USGS aerial image, 2006
- IATA: MAW; ICAO: KMAW; FAA LID: MAW

Summary
- Airport type: Public
- Owner: City of Malden
- Serves: Malden, Missouri
- Elevation AMSL: 294 ft / 90 m
- Coordinates: 36°35′54″N 89°59′33″W

Map
- Location of airport in Missouri

Runways
Direction	Length		Surface
Direction	ft	m	Surface
18/36	5,011	1,527	Asphalt
14/32	4,999	1,524	Asphalt

Statistics (2010)
- Aircraft operations: 9,000
- Based aircraft: 19
- Source: Federal Aviation Administration

Malden Regional Airport (IATA: MAW, ICAO: KMAW, FAA LID: MAW) is a city-owned, public-use airport located three nautical miles (6 km) north of the central business district of Malden, a city in Dunklin County, Missouri, United States. This airport is included in the National Plan of Integrated Airport Systems, which categorized it as a general aviation facility.

It was previously known as Malden Municipal Airport and is located on the site of the former Malden Army Airfield and Malden Air Base.

== History ==
=== Malden Army Airfield ===
Acquired in 1941; construction proceeded throughout 1942 and was activated as Malden Army Airfield on January 6, 1943 by the United States Army Air Forces. Assigned to Eastern Flying Training Command as a basic (level 1) flight training airfield. Flying training was conducted by 319th Aviation Group (Basic). Squadrons were 1069; 1070; 1071 and 1072 Flight Training Squadrons, equipped with Fairchild PT-19s as the primary trainer used. Also had several PT-17 Stearmans and a few P-40 Warhawks assigned.

Malden also had five local auxiliary airfields in vicinity for emergency and overflow landings. Conducted contract flight training and flying training until inactivated and the facility being transferred to I Troop Carrier Command 15 June 1944. Under I TCC, the mission was to train Troop Carrier Groups for missions in the Pacific Theater and the planned Invasion of Japan. However I TCC never began training operations with end of war with Japan in August.

Inactivated on September 30, 1945. and turned over to Army Corps of Engineers on February 1, 1946. Transferred to War Assets Administration who conveyed facility to the local government as an airport in 1948.

=== Malden Air Base ===
Reactivated as Malden Air Base on July 11, 1951 under USAF Air Training Command. Mission of Malden was to train pilots caused by shortages due to expansion of the Air Force during the Cold War. Anderson Air Activities of Milwaukee, Wisconsin conducted basic contract flight training under 3305th Pilot Training Group (Contract Flying).

With pilot production decreasing, the ATC commander suggested closing Malden, in early 1959. However, it wasn't until late December 1959 that Headquarters USAF approved the ATC request. The last primary class graduated on June 29, 1960, and one day later ATC terminated Anderson's training contract. On July 26 the command discontinued the 3305th Pilot Training Group (Contract Primary) with the implementation of USAF Consolidated Pilot Training.

== Facilities and aircraft ==
Malden Regional Airport covers an area of 2,740 acres (1,109 ha) at an elevation of 294 feet (90 m) above mean sea level. It has two runways with asphalt surfaces: 18/36 is 5,011 by 100 feet (1,527 x 30 m) and 14/32 is 4,999 by 80 feet (1,524 x 24 m).

For the 12-month period ending June 14, 2010, the airport had 9,000 aircraft operations, an average of 24 per day: 94% general aviation, 3% air taxi, and 2% military. At that time there were 19 aircraft based at this airport: 74% single-engine and 26% multi-engine.

== See also ==
- Missouri World War II Army Airfields
- List of airports in Missouri
- 32nd Flying Training Wing (World War II)
