= Perryville Regional Airport =

Airport in Perry County, Illinois

Perryville Regional Airport Chester Army Airfield
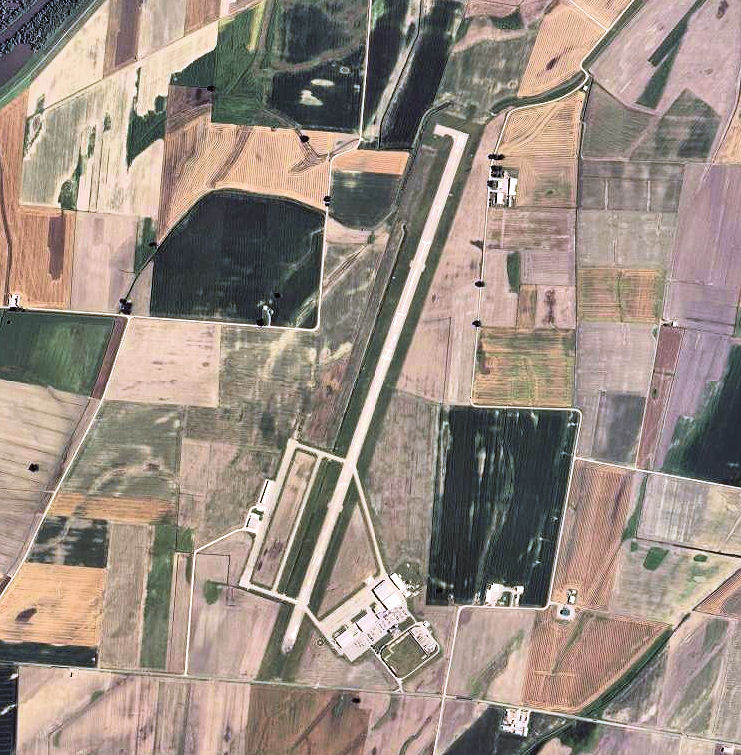
- 2006 USGS Orthophoto
- IATA: none; ICAO: KPCD; FAA LID: PCD (formerly K02)

Summary
- Airport type: Public
- Owner: City of Perryville
- Serves: Perryville, Missouri
- Location: Perry County, Missouri, near Chester, Illinois
- Elevation AMSL: 372 ft / 113 m
- Coordinates: 37°52′07″N 89°51′44″W

Map
- Location of Perryville Municipal Airport

Runways
Direction	Length		Surface
Direction	ft	m	Surface
2/20	7,003	2,135	Concrete

Statistics (2008)
- Aircraft operations: 5,900
- Based aircraft: 9
- Source: Federal Aviation Administration

Perryville Regional Airport (FAA LID: PCD (formerly K02)) (also known as McBride Airport / Perryville Municipal Airport) is a city-owned public-use airport located nine nautical miles (17 km) north of the central business district of Perryville, a city in Perry County, Missouri, United States.

== Facilities and aircraft ==
Perryville Regional Airport covers an area of 351 acres (142 ha) at an elevation of 372 feet (113 m) above mean sea level. It has one runway designated 2/20 with a concrete surface measuring 7,003 by 100 feet (2,135 x 30 m).

For the 12-month period ending June 30, 2011, the airport had 5,900 total aircraft operations, an average of 16 per day: 86% general aviation, 8% military and 5% air taxi. At that time there were nine aircraft based at this airport: eight single-engine and one helicopter.

== History ==
The airport was built in 1942 by the United States Army Air Forces as a primary (stage 1) pilot training airfield assigned to AAF Flying Training Command, Southeast Training Center (later Eastern Flying Training Command). It was named Chester Army Airfield and consisted of two parallel 2000' runways aligned NNE/SSW (02/20).

Flight training was provided by Anderson Air Activities to the aviation cadets assigned to the airfield and Fairchild PT-19s were the primary trainer used. Pilot training at the airfield apparently ended on 30 May 1944, with the drawdown of AAFTC's pilot training program. The airfield was turned over to civil control at the end of the war though the War Assets Administration (WAA).

The name of Perryville Regional Airport and ICAO codes were changed from Perryville Municipal Airport and K02 on March 2, 2017.

== See also ==
- Missouri World War II Army Airfields
- 29th Flying Training Wing (World War II)
