= Harrell Field =

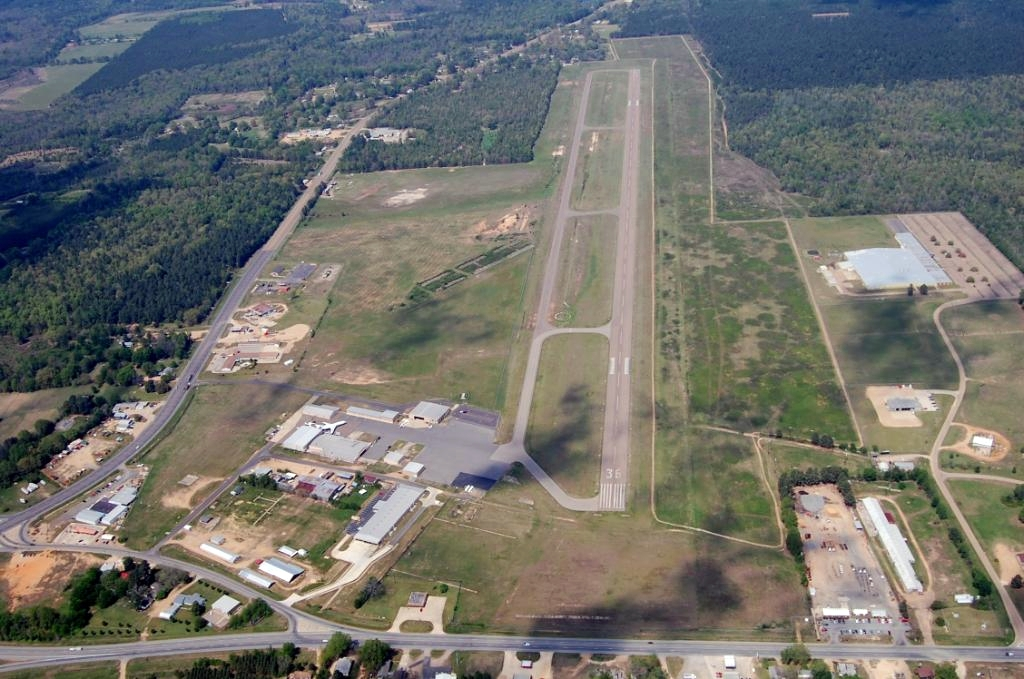
- IATA: CDH; ICAO: KCDH; FAA LID: CDH

Summary
- Airport type: Public
- Owner: City of Camden
- Serves: Camden, Arkansas
- Location: Bradley Township, Ouachita County, Arkansas
- Elevation AMSL: 130 ft (40 m)
- Coordinates: 33°37′22″N 92°45′48″W
- Interactive map of Harrell Field

Runways
Direction	Length		Surface
Direction	ft	m	Surface
18/36	6,502	1,982	Asphalt
- Source: Federal Aviation Administration

Harrell Field (Camden Regional Airport, or Camden Municipal Airport) (IATA: CDH, ICAO: KCDH, FAA LID: CDH) is five miles northeast of Camden, in Ouachita County, Arkansas, United States. The FAA's National Plan of Integrated Airport Systems for 2009–2013 categorizes it as a general aviation facility.

== History ==
The facility opened in August 1942 with a 4,800-foot turf runway. It began training United States Army Air Corps flying cadets under contract to Wiggings-Marden Aero Corp. It was assigned to United States Army Air Forces Gulf Coast Training Center (later Central Flying Training Command) as a primary (level 1) pilot training airfield. It had two local auxiliary airfields for emergency and overflow landings. Flying training was performed with Fairchild PT-19s and Fairchild PT-23s as the primary trainers. It also had several PT-17 Stearmans and a few P-40 Warhawks assigned.

The field was inactivated on 15 April 1944 with the drawdown of AAFTC's pilot training program. It was declared surplus and turned over to the Army Corps of Engineers on 30 September 1945. It was eventually discharged to the War Assets Administration (WAA) and became a civil airport. It appears to have closed after the war about 1951, and was later reopened.

Trans-Texas Airways Douglas DC-3s stopped at Camden, one of many stops on a route between Dallas and Memphis, from 1953 to 1962.

== See also ==
- Arkansas World War II Army Airfields
- List of airports in Arkansas
- 29th Flying Training Wing (World War II)
