= Waynesville–St. Robert Regional Airport =

Waynesville-St. Robert Regional Airport Forney Army Airfield
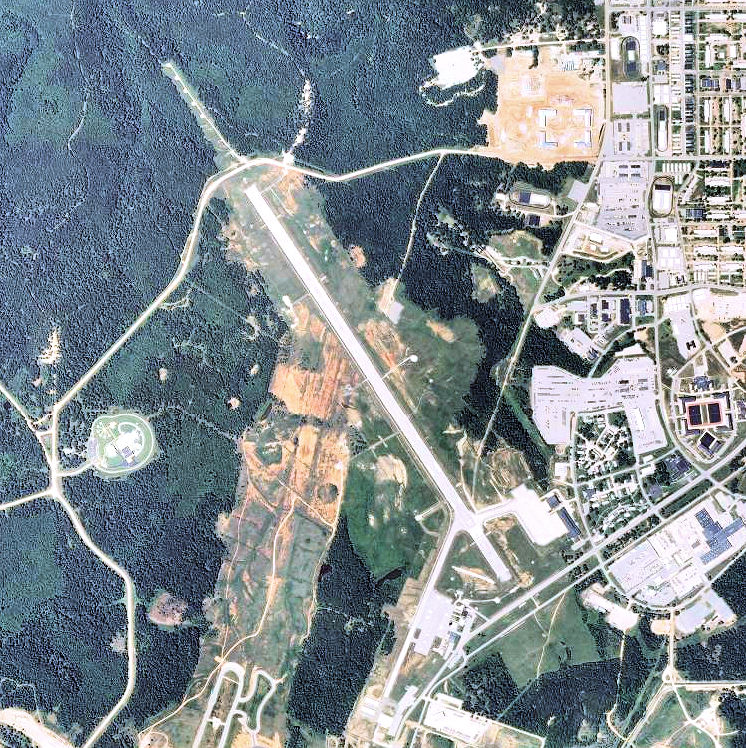
- USGS 2006 orthophoto
- IATA: TBN; ICAO: KTBN; FAA LID: TBN

Summary
- Airport type: Public / military
- Owner: U.S. Army
- Serves: Waynesville & St. Robert, Missouri
- Location: Fort Leonard Wood
- Elevation AMSL: 1,159 ft (353 m)
- Coordinates: 37°44′30″N 092°08′27″W

Map
- Location of airport in Missouri TBN (the United States)

Runways
Direction	Length		Surface
Direction	ft	m	Surface
15/33	6,037	1,840	Asphalt

Statistics
- Aircraft operations (2016): 25,807
- Based aircraft (2021): 14
- Departing passengers (12 months ending Aug 2018): 8,480
- Source: Federal Aviation Administration

Waynesville-St. Robert Regional Airport (IATA: TBN, ICAO: KTBN, FAA LID: TBN), also known as Forney Field, is a public and military use airport located at Fort Leonard Wood in Pulaski County, Missouri, United States. The airport's passenger terminal is operated under the control of the U.S. Army and general aviation is under the direction of a board named by the cities of Waynesville and St. Robert. Formerly known as Waynesville Regional Airport at Forney Field, it is served by one commercial airline with scheduled service subsidized by the Essential Air Service program.

It is included in the National Plan of Integrated Airport Systems for 2021–2025, which categorized it as a non-primary commercial service airport (between 2,500 and 10,000 enplanements per year).

== History ==
During World War II the airfield was used by the United States Army Air Forces. It was known as Forney Army Airfield until 1998. It was attached to Fort Leonard Wood and was part of the Army Service Forces.

== Facilities and aircraft ==
Waynesville-St. Robert Regional Airport covers an area of 237 acres (96 ha) at an elevation of 1,159 feet (353 m) above mean sea level. It has one runway designated 15/33 with an asphalt surface measuring 6,037 by 150 feet (1,840 x 46 m). For the 12-month period ending December 31, 2016, the airport had 25,807 aircraft operations, an average of 71 per day: 50% military, 32% general aviation and 18% scheduled commercial. In June 2021, there were 14 aircraft based at this airport: 9 single-engine and 5 military.

== Airline and destinations ==
Contour Airlines connects Waynesville Airport to O'Hare International Airport (Chicago), Dallas Fort Worth International Airport, and Nashville International Airport.

== Statistics ==
Passenger boardings (enplanements) by year, as per the FAA
Year	2009	2010	2011	2012	2013	2014	2015	2016	2017	2018	2019	2020	2021
Enplanements	4,869	4,159	6,978	7,894	8,325	8,281	8,065	8,108	9,078	7,717	5,404	9,666	11,340
Change	▲1.78%	▼14.58%	▲67.78%	▲13.13%	▲5.46%	▼0.53%	▼2.61%	▲0.53%	▲11.96%	▼14.99%	▼29.97%	▲78.87%	▲17.32%
Airline	Great Lakes Airlines	Great Lakes Airlines	Cape Air	Cape Air	Cape Air	Cape Air	Cape Air	Cape Air	Cape Air	Cape Air	Contour Airlines	Contour Airlines; United Express	United Express
Destination(s)	Kansas City St. Louis	Kansas City St. Louis	St. Louis	St. Louis	St. Louis	St. Louis	St. Louis	St. Louis	St. Louis	St. Louis	St. Louis	St. Louis; Chicago–O'Hare	Chicago–O'Hare

== Accidents and incidents ==
- On August 4, 1955, American Airlines Flight 476, a Convair CV-240 flying from Tulsa to New York crashed while attempting an emergency landing at Fort Leonard Wood, Missouri, after the No. 2 engine caught fire. While descending the right wing caught fire and eventually failed, crashing in a forest 1 km NW of the airport. All 30 occupants (3 crew, 27 passengers) died. The investigation revealed a defective cylinder in the No. 2 engine failed, causing the fire.

== See also ==
- List of airports in Missouri
- Missouri World War II Army Airfields

== Other sources ==
- Essential Air Service documents (Docket OST-1996-1167) from the U.S. Department of Transportation:
  - Order 2007-3-5: selecting Big Sky Transportation Co., d/b/a Big Sky Airlines, and Great Lakes Aviation, Ltd. to provide subsidized essential air service (EAS) at the above communities (Burlington, IA; Cape Girardeau, MO; Fort Leonard Wood, MO; Jackson, TN; Marion/Herrin, IL, Owensboro, KY) for the two-year period from June 1, 2007, through May 31, 2009, using 19-seat Beech 1900D turboprop aircraft as follows: Big Sky at Cape Girardeau, Jackson, and Owensboro for a combined annual subsidy of $3,247,440; and Great Lakes at Burlington, Fort Leonard Wood, and Marion/Herrin for a combined annual subsidy of $2,590,461.
  - Order 2009-10-13: selecting Great Lakes Aviation, Ltd. to provide subsidized EAS at Fort Leonard Wood, Missouri, for the two-year period from November 1, 2009, through October 31, 2011, at an annual subsidy of $1,292,906.
  - Order 2010-9-9: selecting Hyannis Air Service, Inc. d/b/a Cape Air to provide EAS at Fort Leonard Wood, for an annual subsidy of $1,478,102, also for a two-year period beginning when the carrier inaugurates service. An additional $959,664 in annual subsidy may be incurred when all-cargo flights are used to transport luggage to/from Fort Leonard Wood.
