= Tuscaloosa National Airport =

Airport in Alabama

Tuscaloosa National Airport Van De Graaff Field
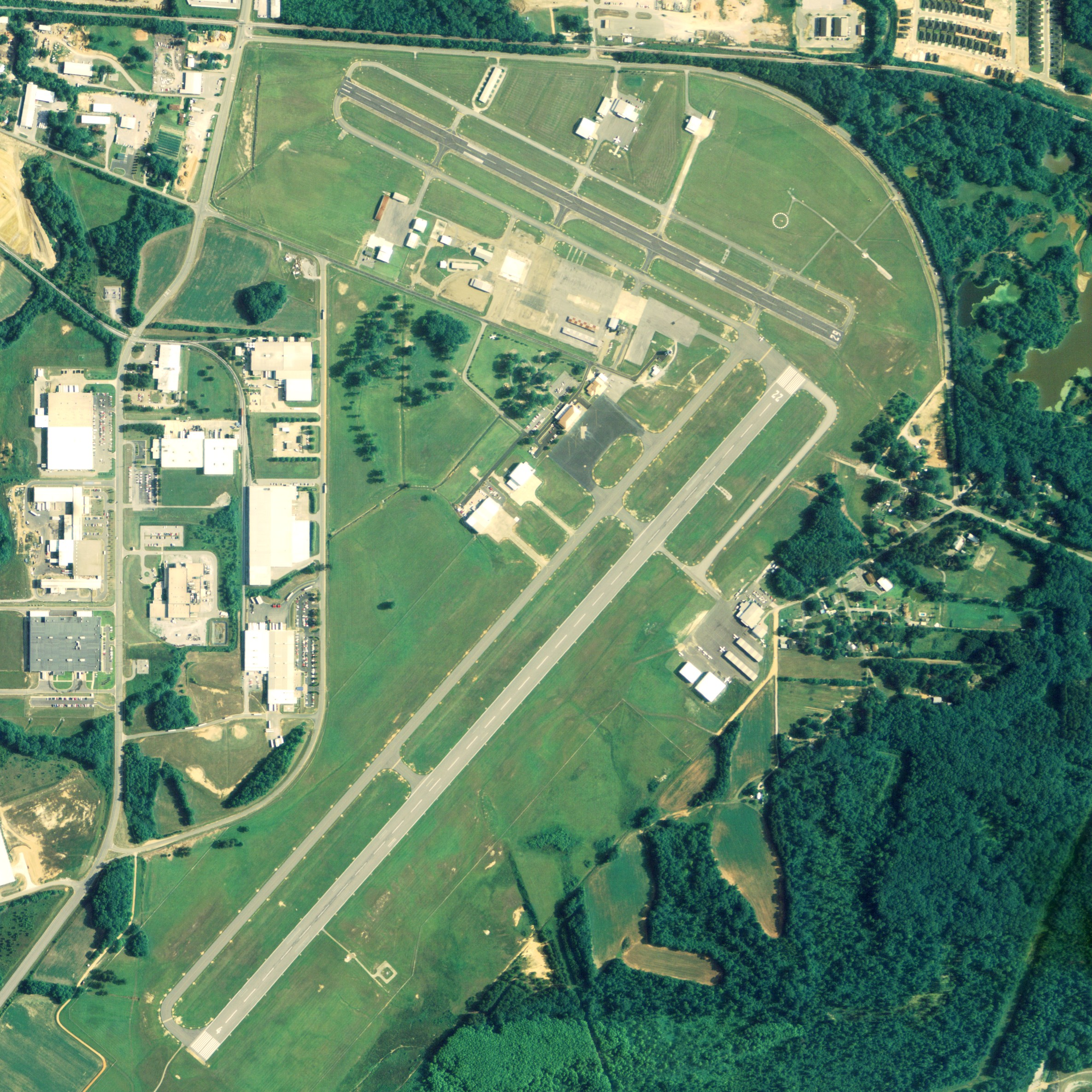
- NAIP image 2006
- IATA: TCL; ICAO: KTCL; FAA LID: TCL

Summary
- Airport type: Public
- Owner: City of Tuscaloosa
- Operator: City of Tuscaloosa Department of Transportation, Airport Management Division
- Serves: Tuscaloosa, Alabama
- Location: Tuscaloosa County, Alabama, U.S.
- Elevation AMSL: 170 ft / 52 m
- Coordinates: 33°13′14″N 87°36′41″W

Map
- Location of airport in Alabama TCL (the United States)

Runways
Direction	Length		Surface
Direction	ft	m	Surface
4/22	6,498	1,981	Asphalt
12/30	4,000	1,219	Asphalt

Statistics (2022)
- Aircraft operations (year ending 6/30/2022): 38,697
- Based aircraft: 108
- Source: Federal Aviation Administration

Tuscaloosa National Airport (IATA: TCL, ICAO: KTCL, FAA LID: TCL) is 3.5 miles northwest of Tuscaloosa, in Tuscaloosa County, Alabama. The airport is owned and operated by the City of Tuscaloosa. The FAA's National Plan of Integrated Airport Systems for 2019–2023 categorized the airport as a general aviation facility. The City of Tuscaloosa changed the name of the airport that had formerly operated under the name Tuscaloosa Regional Airport, in March 2019, to reflect the FAA's official designation as a national airport, one of only 89 in the nation.

Tuscaloosa National Airport had 2,400 commercial passenger boardings (enplanements) in calendar year 2017. Most of this traffic was athletic charters from the University of Alabama. The Tuscaloosa Industrial Park is next to the airport.

Much of the airport property is bordered by the city limits of Northport, Alabama. In fact, the airport and the neighboring Industrial Park are the only areas included in the Tuscaloosa city limits west of Alabama Highway 69 and north of the Black Warrior River.

== Facilities ==
Tuscaloosa National Airport covers 724 acres (293 ha) at an elevation of 170 feet (52 m). It has two asphalt runways: 4/22 is 6,498 by 150 feet (1,981 x 46 m) and 11/29 is 4,000 by 100 feet (1,219 x 30 m). Runway 4 has an Instrument Landing System and approach lights, allowing landings in visibility as low as a half mile.

In the year ending June 30, 2022 the airport had 38,697 aircraft operations, average 106 per day: 76% general aviation, 16% military, 7% air taxi, and <1% airline. 108 aircraft were then based at the airport: 74 single-engine, 17 multi-engine, 12 jet and 5 helicopter.

The airport has two full-service FBOs: Hawthorne Global Aviation Services and Dixie Air Services.

== History ==
=== Origins ===
In 1939 Oliver Parks was brought to Alabama to set up a Civilian Pilot Training Program, CPTP, for the University of Alabama. A brick hangar was built on the property and the first class of students were licensed before the end of 1939.

The airport was opened in April 1940 as Van De Graaff Field. It originally consisted of four turf runways: 00/18 (2500 by 500 feet), 04/22 (3777 by 600 feet), 09/27 (4082 by 600 feet), 13/31 (5208 by 600 feet).

=== World War II ===
During World War II, the field was revamped to include a single main runway (the current 11/29). The rest of the field was usable as an all-way field.

The Civil Aeronautics Administration designated van de Graff Field as an intermediate field (#59). It operated as a United States Army Air Forces primary (phase 1) pilot training field by a detachment of the 51st Flying Training Group, Greenville Army Airfield, Mississippi. In addition to the main field, the following known sub-bases and auxiliaries were used:

- Albright Auxiliary Field (undetermined location)
- Foster Auxiliary Field 33°07′30″N 87°34′00″W
- Knauer Auxiliary Field 33°09′30″N 87°32′00″W
- Moody Auxiliary Field 33°16′00″N 87°32′00″W
- Rice Auxiliary Field 33°11′53″N 87°40′20″W

Pilot training was provided under contract by the Alabama Institute of Aeronautics, Inc. Flying training was performed primarily with Fairchild PT-19s, in addition to PT-17 Stearmans and a few P-40 Warhawks. Beginning in June 1943, Free French Air Force flight cadets began to arrive at the school for Primary flight training, having graduated from the preflight screening school at Craig Field.

Military operations were inactivated on September 8, 1944, with the drawdown of AAFTC's pilot training program. Free French training was transferred to the Hawthorne School of Aeronautics, Orangeburg, South Carolina. The airfield was turned over to city control at the end of the war though the War Assets Administration.

=== Commercial air service ===
Runway 11/29 was paved in the early 1950s. A northeast–southwest runway (4/22) was built in 1970, along with a passenger terminal, to facilitate jet service. Airline service to Tuscaloosa began on June 10, 1949, on a 25-seat Douglas DC-3 as one of the original six destinations served by Southern Airways. Southern later served Tuscaloosa with Martin 4-0-4 piston-powered propeller aircraft and then introduced Douglas DC-9-10 jet service by 1972. Service would peak in the mid-1970s with four daily departures to Atlanta, Memphis and New Orleans. According to the Official Airline Guide (OAG), in early 1976 Southern was operating four DC-9 jet flights a day into the airport with two nonstops from Atlanta as well as two nonstops from Columbus, MS in addition to a daily nonstop Martin 4-0-4 flight from Atlanta, two Martin 4-0-4 nonstops from Columbus, MS, a nonstop Martin 4-0-4 flight from Tupelo, MS and three direct Martin 4-0-4 flights a day from Memphis via Columbus or Tupelo for a total of eight flights on weekdays. In 1979 Southern and North Central Airlines merged to form Republic Airlines. According to the OAG, in 1981 Republic was operating four flights a day into the airport including two Douglas DC-9-10 jet nonstops from Atlanta plus a third direct DC-9-10 flight from Atlanta via Columbus as well as one direct Convair 580 turboprop flight from Memphis via Columbus, MS. Republic subsequently pulled out of Tuscaloosa on June 1, 1984, as most passengers were drawn to nearby Birmingham's airport. Briefly following the exit of Republic, Sunbelt Airlines provided two daily flights to Memphis from June 1 through its elimination of service on September 13, 1984. A Sunbelt Airlines route map in 1984 depicts direct service to Memphis flown via Tupelo with Embraer EMB-110 Bandeirante commuter turboprops.

On April 15, 1986 American Eagle began flying between Tuscaloosa and Nashville. The service was initially operated by Air Midwest and operated three times daily from Tuscaloosa with 19 seat Fairchild Swearingen Metroliner commuter propjets. According to the OAG, in 1994 American Eagle was operating three nonstop flights a day with British Aerospace BAe Jetstream 31 and Saab 340 commuter propjets from the Nashville hub operated at the time by American Airlines. Service ended with the closure of the Nashville hub in June 1996, with service being redirected to Dallas/Fort Worth on 34 seat Saab 340s via Jackson. Due to dwindling passenger counts, the city voluntarily removed itself from the Essential Air Service (EAS) program resulting in service being discontinued on April 18, 1997.

Atlantic Southeast Airlines (ASA) flew between Tuscaloosa and Atlanta from 1982 to June 1992. The OAG lists six flights a day into the airport in 1985 operated by ASA as Delta Connection flights on behalf of Delta Air Lines with nonstop service from Atlanta, Memphis, Columbus, GA and Gadsden, AL with all service flown with Embraer EMB-110 Bandeirante commuter turboprops. In late 1989, two airlines were serving Tuscaloosa according to the OAG: American Eagle with three direct flights a day from Nashville via a stop in Columbus, MS or Tupelo, MS flown with Fairchild Swearingen Metroliner commuter propjets and Atlantic Southeast Airlines operating as the Delta Connection with three direct flights a day from Atlanta via a stop in Anniston, AL or Columbus, MS flown with Embraer EMB-120 Brasilia commuter propjets. GP Express Airlines would continue service to Atlanta from June 6, 1992, through the elimination of its EAS subsidy on June 30, 1994. A GP Express route map in 1992 depicts nonstop flights to Atlanta, Anniston and Hattiesburg, MS with the flights to Anniston continuing on to Atlanta.

No airlines have served Tuscaloosa on a scheduled basis since the departure of American Eagle in 1997.

=== Attempts to restore commercial service ===
In the 2000s (decade) the city and the airport tried to lure airlines back to the airport. Between 2002 and 2006 the airport received $2.2 million in federal, state, and local money to improve its facilities, including $400,000 from the FAA as part of a program to help restore airline service to smaller cities. The city matched the grant with $100,000 of local funding. In 2006 the city authorized paying $8500 to a consulting firm to court airlines in an effort to revive service to the airport. City and airport officials stated their belief that the area was in a different economic picture with the Mercedes-Benz plant in the city (the only one in North America) and new developments around the campus of the University of Alabama, including an expansion to Bryant–Denny Stadium. Hopes of commercial service returning to West Alabama were revived again in 2019 as part of Tuscaloosa Mayor's Walt Maddox Elevate Tuscaloosa proposal included $15 million in funding that would receive matching funds to renovate the terminal at Tuscaloosa National to make the growing city more appealing to commercial airlines.

DayJet announced per seat VLJ service on two pilot planes nonstop to 14 hubs in 3 states in July 2008 from Tuscaloosa. DayJet discontinued all passenger service operations on September 19, 2008, citing the inability to raise financing needed for continued operations.

While visiting Tuscaloosa on April 29, 2011, to assess devastation reliefs efforts in the wake of the April 27th tornado disaster, President Barack Obama landed at then-Tuscaloosa Regional Airport in the Boeing C-32 presidential transport plane. The C-32 is the U.S. Air Force designation for the Boeing 757-200 jetliner.

Jet charters appear at Tuscaloosa, but scheduled air service has eluded Tuscaloosa National to date.

== Current operations ==
Many charters fly college football, basketball, baseball, softball, gymnastics, and volleyball teams visiting the Alabama Crimson Tide, or take the University of Alabama teams to their away games. Most Alabama football charters are operated by Delta Air Lines using the Boeing 757. Visiting football charters are operated by many carriers typically using either Boeing 737s or Boeing 757s. Many visiting football teams fly into Birmingham and lodge there, commuting to Tuscaloosa on game day, since there is often not enough available hotel rooms to accommodate a football team's traveling party under one roof. In this case, although the team arrives at Birmingham-Shuttlesworth International Airport, they will usually depart from Tuscaloosa National Airport after the game. Sometimes more than one aircraft is used for larger games, with one flying the team and support staff and the other flying university alumni or fans that have paid for a charter. Baseball, basketball, gymnastics, softball, and volleyball charters are typically operated on a Boeing 737, CRJ200, CRJ700, ERJ 135/145, EMB 120, or Saab 2000. There are also freight charters commonly operated by McDonnell Douglas DC-9s and Boeing 727s to supply the automotive companies which support the Mercedes Benz manufacturing plant.

== See also ==
- Alabama World War II Army Airfields
- List of airports in Alabama
- 29th Flying Training Wing (World War II)
