= Victor Carlstrom =

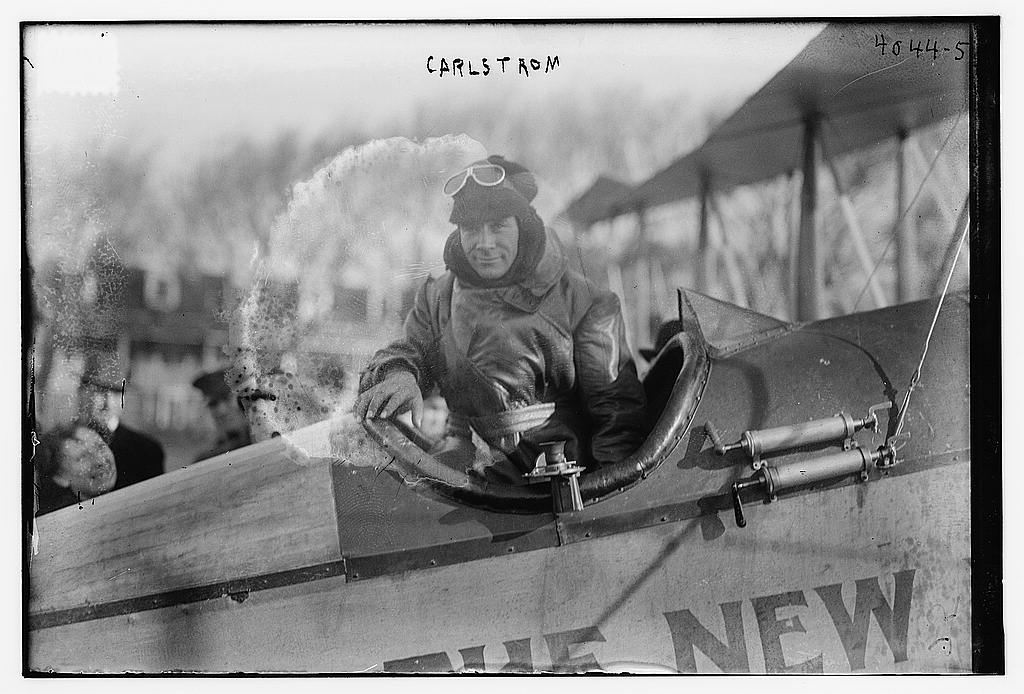
1st Lieutenant Victor Carlström (April 13, 1890 - May 9, 1917) in 1916

1st Lieutenant Victor Carlström (April 13, 1890 – May 9, 1917) was a record-holding Swedish-American pioneer aviator. He set a cross-America flight air speed record until the record was beaten by Ruth Bancroft Law.

== Biography ==
He was born in Gustafs parish in Kopparberg, Sweden on April 13, 1890, to Axel Carlström.

He migrated to the United States through Ellis Island in 1904, when he was 14. He moved to North Park, Colorado to work for his uncles Andrew Carlstrom and William Norell Carlstrom who had cattle ranches. He became an instructor one week after leaving his job at the cattle ranch.

In 1916 he was 2,000 feet (610 m) short of a flight altitude record when he ascended 16,000 feet (4,900 m) in a triplane. He also planned to make a non-stop flight from Chicago to New York.

He went to work for the Atlantic Coast Aeronautical Station where he and a student pilot, Cary B. Epes, were killed on May 9, 1917, when their biplane collapsed in flight.

== Legacy ==
- Carlstrom Field was named in his honor.
- His niece, Marion Carlstrom, was the first Women Airforce Service Pilot from Colorado.
