= Everett–Stewart Regional Airport =

Airport in Obion County, Tennessee

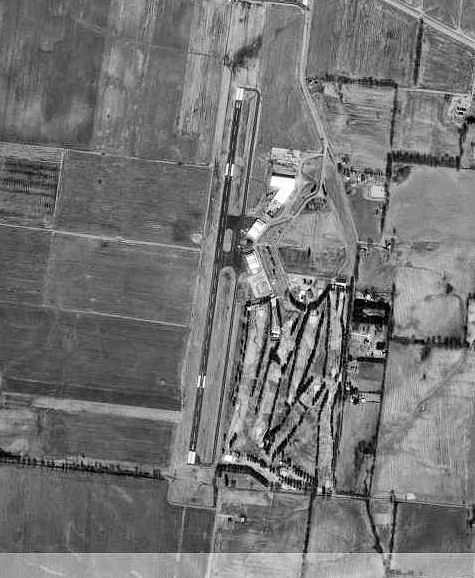
- USGS 1997 orthophoto
- IATA: UCY; ICAO: KUCY; FAA LID: UCY

Summary
- Airport type: Public
- Owner: Obion County
- Serves: Union City, Tennessee / Martin, Tennessee
- Elevation AMSL: 346 ft (105 m)
- Coordinates: 36°22′47″N 88°59′09″W
- Website: https://www.estewartregionalairport.us/

Map
- Location within Tennessee

Runways
Direction	Length		Surface
Direction	ft	m	Surface
1/19	6,503	1,982	Asphalt

Statistics (2020)
- Aircraft operations (year ending 3/26/2020): 28,350
- Based aircraft: 41
- Source: Federal Aviation Administration

Everett–Stewart Regional Airport (IATA: UCY, ICAO: KUCY, FAA LID: UCY) is in Obion County, Tennessee, five miles southeast of Union City, Tennessee, United States. The National Plan of Integrated Airport Systems for 2011–2015 categorized it as a general aviation facility.

The airport is named for Senator Tom Stewart and Congressman Robert A. "Fats" Everett.

== Facilities ==
The airport covers 857 acres (347 ha) at an elevation of 346 feet (105 m). Its single runway, 1/19, is 6,503 by 100 feet (1,982 x 30 m).

For its services, the airport offers self-serve and full-service fueling, aircraft tie-downs, public and private hangar space, three crew cars, and an A&P mechanic shop based on the northern end of the field, along with bathroom facilities, vending machines, ice bags, multiple grades of piston aircraft oil, and a pilot's lounge. The airport also owns three tugs for the towing of aircraft, a 12/28-volt Start-Cart, and a larger 28/120/208-volt DC/AC diesel ground power unit.

For refueling operations, the airport has two above-ground tanks and 1 3,000 gallon fueling truck. Each above ground tank has a capacity of 12,000 gallons: one for 100-octane low-lead Avgas and one for Jet A-1. The Jet A-1 fuel sold there is mixed with Prist, an icing inhibitor. The 3,000 gallon fuel truck carries JET A-1, and has nozzles to facilitate fueling via over-wing and by single-point, along with variable pump speed.

For aircraft storage, the airport still retains the two main World War II hangars it had; it maintains them for use as public space, to either be leased or temporarily rented nightly. For private hangar space, the airport has 14 modern T-hangars, which are leased to clients.

For the year ending on March 26, 2020 the airport had 41 aircraft based on-field, 32 of which were single-engine piston powered, 5 multi-engine, 2 helicopters, and 2 gliders. The airport averaged 78 aircraft operations per day over the 12-month period: 53% local general aviation, 42% transient general aviation, 5% air taxi, and <1% military.

=== Civil Air Patrol ===
Everett-Stewart Regional Airport has been home to the Everett-Stewart Composite Squadron (SER-TN-195) of the Tennessee Wing Civil Air Patrol since 2011. It was re-chartered as the Union City Composite Squadron in 2022.

== History ==
The airport was established in 1942 by the United States Army Air Forces. It was also then known as Union City Airport. When activated on July 5, 1942, the airfield had one 1,800' north-south asphalt runway, and a 4000 x 3900 sod landing/takeoff area. There also may have been three auxiliary landing fields in the area.

The airfield was operated under contract to the USAAF by Embry Riddle-McKay Co. of TN and Riddle Aeronautical Institute providing flight (level 1) instruction to cadets, mainly in Fairchild PT-19s. There were also several PT-17 Stearmans and a few P-40 Warhawks. Contract training was performed there until the airfield was inactivated on April 15, 1944, with the drawdown of AAFTC's pilot training program.

At the end of the war, the airfield land was turned over to civil control through the War Assets Administration (WAA) under the prerequisite that the land must remain in use as an airport available to the public.

Southeast Airlines DC-3s stopped there 1957–59, and Southern Airlines DC-3s in 1961–63.

Since then, and in modern times, the airport traffic mainly consists of local and transient general aviation aircraft, ranging in commonality from Cessna 150, 172 and 182 (skylane), Beechcraft Bonanza, to Cirrus SR-22, along with many others. The airport also has occasional business and charter traffic, often showing up a few times a week. These aircraft range from smaller turbine and turbofan aircraft such as those from Beechcraft's King Air series, Mitsubishi's MU-2, Cessna's Citation series, and Learjet 45 aircraft. Larger aircraft commonly seen include Cessna Citation X+, Dassault Falcon 900 and Falcon 50, Bombardier Challenger 650, and Gulfstream G-IV.

Helicopter operations at the airport are much less common at KUCY, although they are still seen at least a few times a week, such as the smaller Robinson R44 to Eurocopter EC135 and even UH-60 Blackhawks. A Kaman K-MAX was also once spotted there.

== See also ==
- Tennessee World War II Army Airfields
- List of airports in Tennessee
- 29th Flying Training Wing (World War II)
