= Carlstrom Field =

Former military airfield in DeSoto County, Florida

- DeSoto County, near Arcadia, Florida
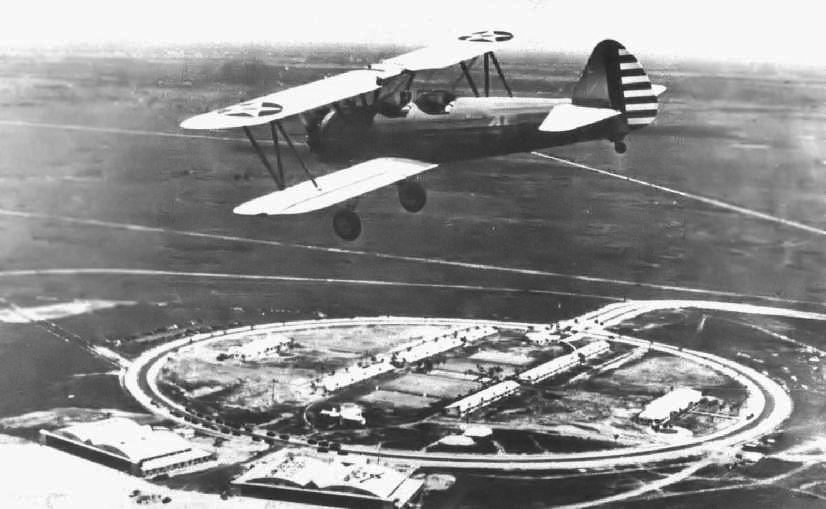
- A 1942 photo of a Major George Ola in a PT-17 Stearman biplane trainer over Carlstrom Field

Site information
- Type: Army Airfield
- Controlled by: Air Service, United States Army; United States Army Air Forces
- Condition: DeSoto County Juvenile Correctional Complex

Location
- Coordinates: 27°08′18″N 81°48′10″W

Site history
- Built: 1917
- In use: 1917–1945
- Battles/wars: World War I World War II

Garrison information
- Garrison: Training Section, Air Service (World War I); Army Air Force Training Command (World War I)

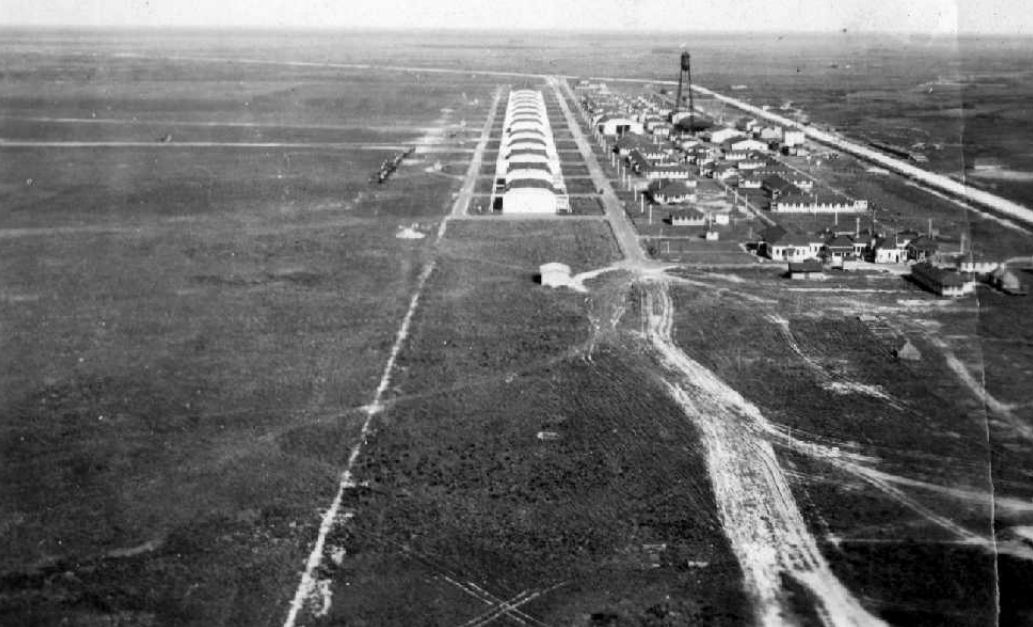
Carlstrom Field, Florida, World War I photograph, 1918

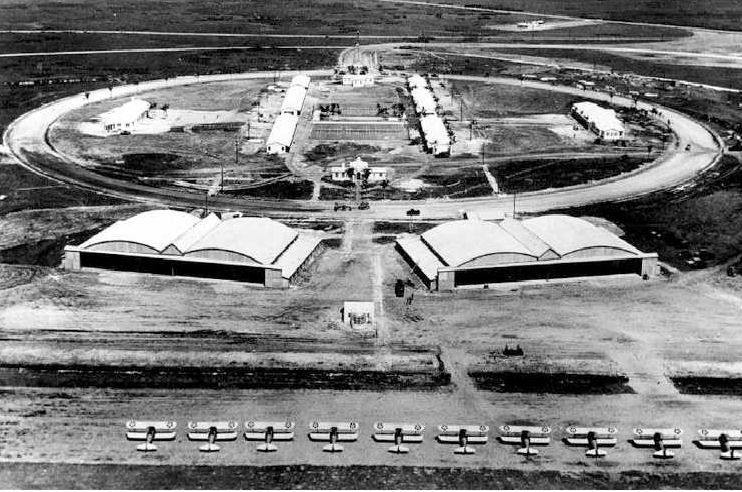
Carlstrom Field, Florida, World War II, note the PT-17 Stearmans on the flight line and the rebuilt hangars and ground station.

Carlstrom Field is a former military airfield, located 6.4 miles (10.3 km) southeast of Arcadia, Florida. The airfield was one of thirty-two Air Service training camps established in 1917 after the United States entry into World War I.

== History ==
Carlstrom Field was named after 1st Lieutenant Victor Carlstrom.

=== World War I ===
In 1917 the Army announced its intention of establishing a series of camps to train prospective pilots after the United States entry into World War I. An Army survey crew was sent to Southwest Florida looking for suitable sites to build airfields, one selected was a site about 6 miles to the southeast of Arcadia, Florida. An agreement to lease the land for the Army was concluded, and the construction of some 90 buildings began in January 1918. It covered over 700 acres (2.8 km^{2}) which included fourteen hangars that housed four to eight planes each, a hospital, and six barracks that held 175 men each. Dozens of wooden buildings served as headquarters, maintenance, and officers’ quarters. Enlisted men had to bivouac in tents.

In March, 1918 the 107th and 108th Aero Squadrons was transferred from Rich Field, Waco, Texas and assigned to the new Carlstrom Field. In April the 76th and 109th Aero Squadrons, also arrived from Rich Field, but were subsequently transferred over to Dorr Field; which was designed as an auxiliary sub-field for Carlstrom. Only a few Air Service aircraft arrived from Waco; most of the Curtiss JN-4 Jennys to be used for flight training were shipped in wooden crates by railcar. Carlstrom Field served as an advanced school for pursuit pilots. It offered a six-week course. It had a student capacity of 400.

Squadrons assigned to Carlstrom Field were:

- Post Headquarters, Carlstrom Field, March–September 1919
- 107th Aero Squadron (II), March 1918

Re-designated: Squadron "A", July–November 1918

- 108th Aero SquadronII), March 1918

Re-designated: Squadron "B", July–November 1918

- 111th Aero Squadron (II), May 1918 (Initially at Dorr Field)

Re-designated: Squadron "C", July–November 1918

- 205th Aero Squadron (II), April 1918

Re-designated: Squadron "D", July–November 1918

- 284th Aero Squadron (II), February 1918

Re-designated: Squadron "E", July–November 1918

- 302d Aero Squadron (Service), June 1918

Re-designated: Squadron "F", July–November 1918

- Flying School Detachment (Consolidation of Squadrons A–F), November 1918 – September 1919

In addition to the training at Carlstrom Field, the pursuit pilot school operated a sub-field, Valentine Field, located at Labelle, Lee County, Florida. Valentine Field was named in honor of 2d Lieutenant Herman W. Valentine, who was killed in an airplane accident at Carlstrom Field on 4 May 1918. Junius Wallace Jones, who later rose to the rank of Major General and was the first Inspector-General of the United States Air Force received his flight training here.

With the sudden end of World War I in November 1918, the future operational status of Carlstrom Field was unknown. Many local officials speculated that the U.S. government would keep the field open because of the outstanding combat record established by Carlstrom-trained pilots in Europe. Locals also pointed to the optimal weather conditions in the Southwest Florida area for flight training. Cadets in flight training on 11 November 1918 were allowed to complete their training, however no new cadets were assigned to the base. Also the separate training squadrons were consolidated into a single Flying School detachment, as many of the personnel assigned were being demobilized.

=== Inter-war period ===
Rapid demobilization followed the end of World War I, and despite the experience of that conflict, the Army's air arm remained quite small during most of the interwar period. After the armistice, Carlstrom Field served as a testing area for various aircraft, dirigibles, and other aeronautical weapons. In October 1919, final testing of an experimental unmanned aircraft called the "Kettering Bug", one of the earliest examples of a cruise missile, was successfully tested & launched at Carlstrom Field.

In January 1920 primary pilot instruction resumed on a small scale at Carlstrom Field with the opening of the Air Service Pilots' School. Training in primary flying took place at both Carlstrom and Dorr Fields. However, the administrative difficulties of the Air Service training about 200 flying cadets concurrently at such widely separated locations in Texas, California and Florida prompted a decision in 1923 to centralize all flying training in San Antonio, Texas. Carlstrom was ordered to phase down all activities at the base, and the flying training school was subsequently transferred to Brooks Field.

The War Department had ordered that a small caretaker force remain to dismantle all remaining structures and to sell them as surplus, and by 1926 Carlstrom field was closed. Throughout the remainder of the 1920s and 1930s, the War Department leased out the vacant land to local farmers and ranchers.

=== World War II ===
With the need for primary pilot training brought on by World War II, Carlstrom re-opened in March 1941 under the operation of Riddle Aeronautical Institute. The 53d Flying Training Detachment was activated under then Brigadier-General Junius Wallace Jones, who learned to fly at Carlstrom. The 53d FTD exercised Air Corps oversight of Embry-Riddle. A new facility was built adjacent to the remains of World War I-era facilities and Riddle contracted to train Royal Air Force aviators under the Arnold Scheme and graduated the first class in August 1941.

Carlstrom Field had a very unusual layout, with a compact group of buildings located inside a circular road, with five hangars located around the southern periphery of the road. No paved runway was ever built with the flying conducted from the 1-square-mile (2.6 km^{2}) grass field.

=== Postwar use ===
Closed after the war, Carlstrom Field became the site of the G. Pierce Wood Memorial Hospital, a psychiatric hospital, in 1947. Many of World War II era buildings remained in use by the hospital, with former six-plane hangars serving as maintenance buildings. The band shell, site of dances and other entertainment during the war, remains on the site.

In 2002, the G. Pierce Wood Memorial Hospital was closed; until 2011 the DeSoto County Juvenile Correctional Facility operated on the site. The only remembrance of Carlstrom field today is a plaque on the administration building placed when it was refurbished by the state of Florida in 1992, and a tired B-17 weather vane on top of the building.

The Oak Ridge Cemetery in Arcadia is the final resting-place of twenty-three RAF cadets who died while in the United States for training. A special marker at the cemetery recognizes their service and a ceremony is held in their memory each year on Memorial Day.

Six hangars were constructed at Carlstrom Field. The two built first survive today. Also still standing are the mess hall, band shell, canteen, administration building, water and sewage plants, Barracks and two training buildings. All that remains from World War I version of Carlstrom Field are concrete pads along Highway 31 upon which the wooden hangars stood, and across the highway, on private property, is a concrete full-scale outline of a World War I biplane that is approximately one foot tall. It was used for target practice by filling it up with water and cadets would shoot at it from the air and be able to see "hits" when their bullets struck the water.

In 2014, the state of Florida sold the property to Power Auto Corporation, for the construction of a driver training facility and a hotel.

While a few buildings remain, the only recognition that this was an air base is a commemorative plaque.

== See also ==
- Florida World War II Army Airfields
- United States Army World War I Flight Training
- 29th Flying Training Wing (World War II)
