= Hawthorne School of Aeronautics =

Flying school and airport in South Carolina, US

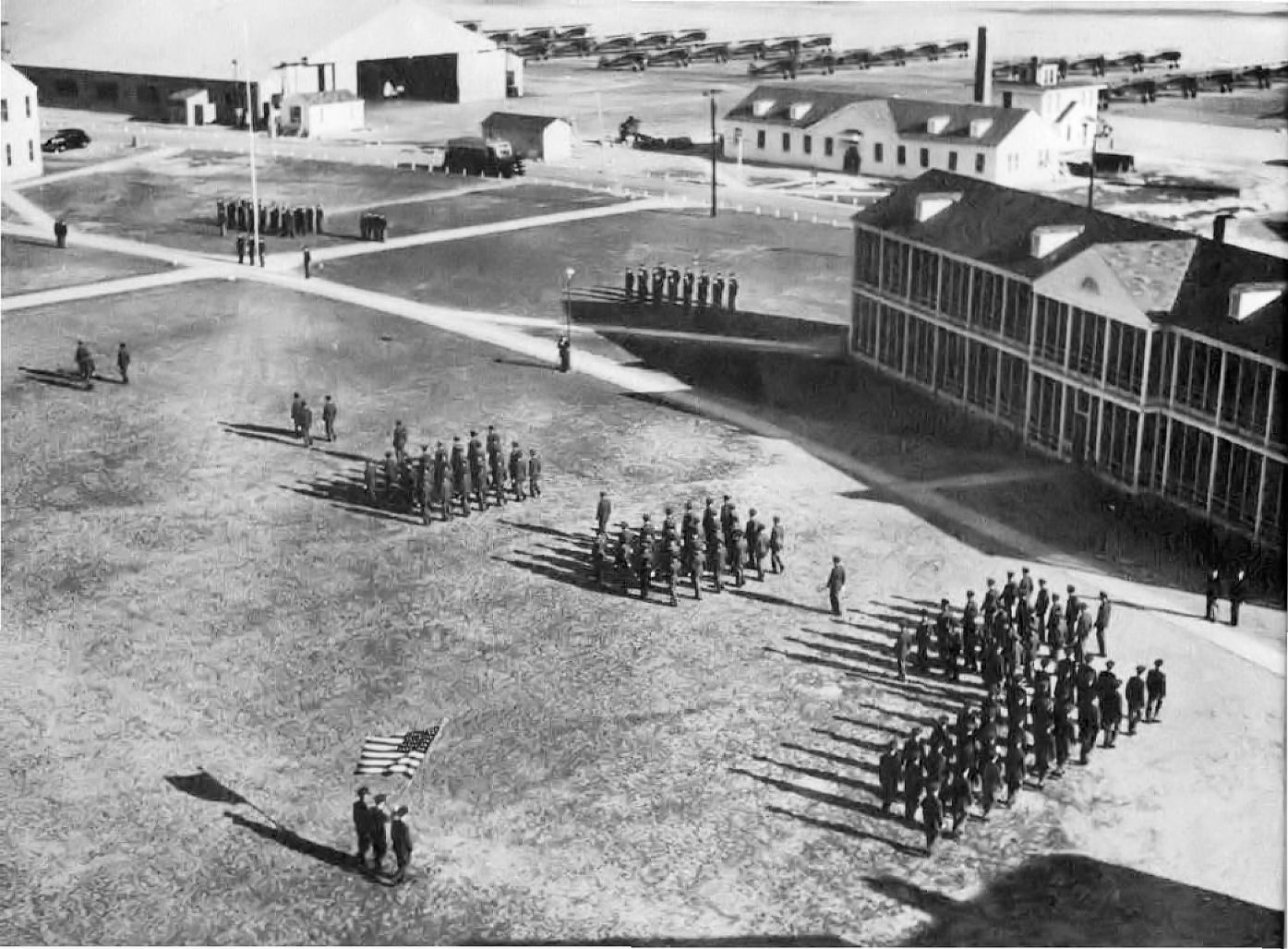
- Flight Cadets of the 58th Flying Training Detachment standing in formation at the Hawthorne School of Aeronautics, 1943
- IATA: none; ICAO: none

Summary
- Serves: Orangeburg, South Carolina
- Coordinates: 33°25′10″N 080°51′01″W

Map
- Location of Hawthorne School of Aeronautics

Hawthorne School of Aeronautics was a flying school and airport located 5 miles south of Orangeburg, South Carolina. The school was closed in 1945. Currently, the land is being used for non-aviation purposes.

== History ==
The Hawthorne School of Aeronautics was a World War II civilian flying school, contracted by the United States Army Air Forces to conduct primary pilot training for aviation cadets. The school was under the supervision of the 58th Flying Training Detachment, Eastern Flight Training Center, Army Air Forces Training Command. The president of Hawthorne was Beverly "Bevo" Howard, who had learned to fly at the age of 16. The military designation of the Hawthorne school was the 2162nd Army Air Force Base Unit.

In order to conduct the flying training, the school built an airfield along with buildings and other support structures. The airfield was an all-way turf field, with four delineated runways (00/18; 05/23; 09/27; 14/32). A large aircraft parking ramp and two hangars were also constructed, along with a control tower and operations building. The school structures consisted of a group of one- and two-story wooden buildings surrounding an oval-shaped grass area at the northern end of the property, which served as a parade ground.

The primary trainer used was Boeing PT-17 Stearman. The flight school also operated several auxiliary airfields:

- Jennings Aux Field – Aux No. 1 Orangeburg 33°27′46″N 80°51′23″W
- Hagood Aux Field – Aux No. 2 Orangeburg 33°26′00″N 80°40′30″W
- Kennedy Aux Field – Aux No. 3 Orangeburg 33°23′40″N 81°02′00″W
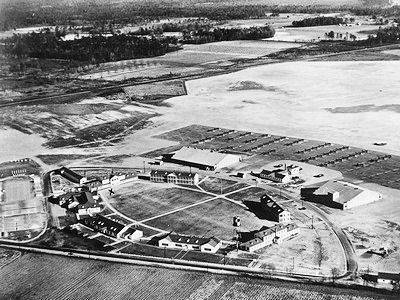
Aerial photo of Orangeburg Airport, South Carolina, 1944

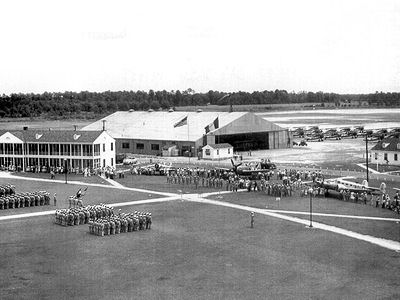
Parade Ground, Barracks and Parking Apron

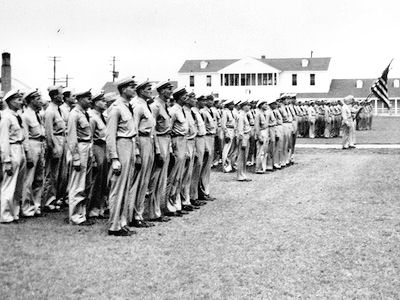
Formation of Free French flying cadets

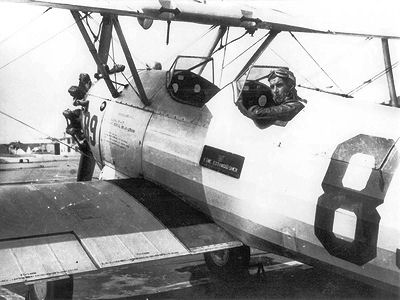
Boeing PT-17 Stearman at Orangeburg

At the end of 1944, training of Free French pilots was transferred from Hargrove Van de Graaft Airport, Tuscaloosa, Alabama to Hawthorne. The unit was inactivated on 1 September 1945. During the Second World War, Hawthorne trained 5,924 military pilots, including more than 2,000 French Air Force students. For his leadership, Bevo Howard was presented the French Air Force Wings, the French Médaille de L'Aéronautique, and later the Ordre National de la Légion d'honneur for his pilot training and accomplishments as an aerobatic flyer.

Hawthorne School of Aeronautics 1943 photo pictorial

The Hawthorne School of Aeronautics ceased operations at Orangeburg with the end of the war, however, it went on to continue operations at Jacksonville, Florida, and Moultrie, Georgia. The firm eventually became the large Piedmont-Hawthorne chain of aviation Fixed-Base Operators.

The airport was closed after the war, and was abandoned. The two hangars from the flying school were relocated at some point to the Orangeburg Municipal Airport at which there is also an excellent historical display of the activities of the Hawthorne school.

== See also ==
- South Carolina World War II Army Airfields
