= Woodward Field (airport) =

Woodward Field Kershaw County Airport
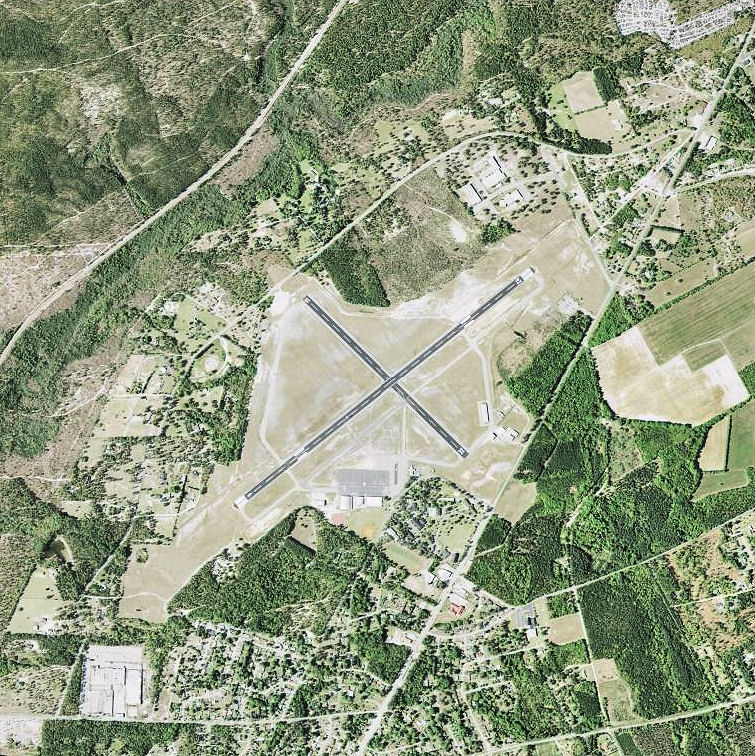
- USGS aerial photo - 2006
- IATA: CDN; ICAO: KCDN; FAA LID: CDN

Summary
- Airport type: Public
- Owner: Kershaw County
- Serves: Camden, South Carolina
- Location: Kershaw County, near Camden, South Carolina
- Elevation AMSL: 302 ft / 92 m
- Coordinates: 34°17′01″N 80°33′54″W

Map
- Location of Woodward Field

Runways
| Direction | Length | | Surface |
| Direction | ft | m | Surface |
|---|---|---|---|
| 6/24 | 5,000 | 1,524 | Asphalt |
| 14/32 | 2,998 | 914 | Asphalt |

Statistics (2018)
- Aircraft operations: 8,250
- Based aircraft: 30
- Source: Federal Aviation Administration

Woodward Field (IATA: CDN, ICAO: KCDN, FAA LID: CDN) is a county-owned public-use airport located 3 nautical miles (5.6 kilometres) northeast of the central business district of Camden, a city in Kershaw County, South Carolina, United States. It is also known as the Kershaw County Airport. The airport serves the general aviation community, with no scheduled commercial airline service.

== Facilities and aircraft ==
Woodward Field covers an area of 396 acres (160 ha) at an elevation of 302 feet (92 m) above mean sea level. It has two asphalt paved runways: 6/24 is a 5,000-by-100-foot (1,524 by 30 m) lighted runway and 14/32 is 2,998 by 100 ft (914 by 30 m) crosswind runway.

For the 12-month period ending 8 August 2018, the airport had 8,250 aircraft operations, an average of 23 per day: 93.2% general aviation, 3.8% air taxi and 3% military. At that time there were 30 aircraft based at this airport: 87% single-engine, 3% multi-engine, 6% jet and 3% helicopter.

The airport has two aviation related businesses: Camden Jet Center, a full-service FBO, and Aircraft Maintenance Services.

== History ==
=== Origins ===
Woodward Field is named for philanthropist and equestrian Ernest Woodward, who donated 160 acres (0.65 km^{2}) of land for an airport in 1929. The airport was dedicated on November 7, 1929, as the most modern airfield in the Southeast. Ernest Woodward and his wife Edith owned the 25 acre Holly Hedge estate in Camden as their winter home from 1926 to 1944 when they sold it to Marion duPont Scott. Woodward, with his brother, had sold the Jell-O Company in 1926 to Marjorie Merriweather Post and her husband E.F. Hutton as an early acquisition of what eventually became the General Foods Corporation. Woodward was a Director of General Foods until his death in 1948. He also provided the funds to build the Springdale Race Course and various other Camden properties.

=== World War II ===
In 1941 the United States Army Air Forces indicated a need for the airfield as a training airfield. Activated on 22 March 1941, Woodward Field was used by the Army Air Forces Flying Training Command, Southeast Training Center (later Eastern Flying Training Command) as a basic flying training airfield, with instruction being carried out by the 64th Flying Training Detachment. The Camden-based Southern Aviation School was the civilian contractor performing the basic flight training. Flying training was performed with Fairchild PT-19s as the primary trainer. It also had several PT-17 Stearmans and a few P-40 Warhawks assigned.

Robert K. Morgan, pilot of the Memphis Belle B-17 aircraft, had his primary training at Woodward Field. Along with the USAAF flying cadets, Royal Air Force personnel were also trained at Woodward under the Arnold Scheme. Two small turf airfields were also used by the training school during the war.

Flying training ended on 4 August 1944 and afterwards the airfield returned to civil control. The barracks used by the Southern Aviation School turned into Camden Academy in 1950, a military school established by locals. In 1958, the academy was reestablished as Camden Military Academy, which still connects to the airport.

== See also ==
- South Carolina World War II Army Airfields
- 29th Flying Training Wing (World War II)
- List of airports in South Carolina
