= Minnesota World War II Army Airfields =

Minnesota World War II Army Airfields
- Part of World War II

Site information
- Type: Army Airfields

Location
- Map Of Minnesota World War II Army Airfields

Site history
- Built: 1940-1944
- In use: 1940-present

During World War II, the United States Army Air Forces (USAAF) established numerous airfields in Minnesota for training pilots and aircrews of USAAF fighters and bombers.

Most of these airfields were under the command of First Air Force or the Army Air Forces Training Command (AAFTC) (A predecessor of the current-day United States Air Force Air Education and Training Command). However the other USAAF support commands (Air Technical Service Command (ATSC); Air Transport Command (ATC) or Troop Carrier Command) commanded a significant number of airfields in a support roles.

It is still possible to find remnants of these wartime airfields. Many were converted into municipal airports, some were returned to agriculture and several were retained as United States Air Force installations and were front-line bases during the Cold War. Hundreds of the temporary buildings that were used survive today, and are being used for other purposes.

== Major Airfields ==
Air Transport Command

- Minneapolis MAP, Minneapolis

Joint use USAAF/Civil Airport
Now: Minneapolis-Saint Paul International Airport and Minneapolis-Saint Paul Joint Air Reserve Station (IATA: MSP, ICAO: KMSP, FAA LID: MSP)

Air Technical Service Command

- Holman Field/St. Paul MAP, St. Paul

Joint use USAAF/Civil Airport
Now: St. Paul Downtown Airport (IATA: STP, ICAO: KSTP, FAA LID: STP)

Army Air Force Training Command

- Flynn Field/Lake Elmo APT, Lake Elmo

Contract flying training
Now: Lake Elmo Airport (IATA: 21D)

- Monticello AAF, Monticello

Contract flying training/Glider training
Now: Returned to agriculture.

- Lobb Field/Rochester AAF, Rochester

Contract flying training/Glider training
Closed 1961. Now: Industrial site.
