= List of United States Army Air Forces reconnaissance units =

North American F-6C (P-51C-5-NT) Mustang Serial 42-103368 of the 15th Tactical Reconnaissance Squadron, 10th Reconnaissance Group at Saint-Dizier Airfield, France, Autumn 1944. This aircraft was flown by Captain John H. Hoefler, who used it to shoot down three enemy aircraft in June 1944.

This is a list of United States Army Air Forces reconnaissance units, primarily operating during World War II. The subsequent United States Air Force unit lineage is noted where applicable.

== Groups ==
- 1st Photographic Group

May 1941-Oct 1944
HQ USAAF; Second Air Force (ZI)
Operated F-2 (C-45), F-3 (A-20), F-7 (B-24), F-9 (B-17), F-10 (B-25), A-29, and B-18
Squadrons deployed Worldwide Photo-Mapping

- 2d Reconnaissance Group

Constituted as 2d Photographic Group
May 1942-May 1944
Second Air Force (ZI); Third Air Force (ZI)
Operated F-3 (A-20), F-5 (P-38), F-7 (B-24), F-9 (B-17)
Operational Training Unit

- 3d Reconnaissance Group

Constituted as 3d Photographic Group
Jun 1942-Mar 1947
Twelfth Air Force (MTO)
Operated F-4/F-5 (P-38)
Combat Photo-Reconnaissance

- 4th Reconnaissance Group

Constituted as 4th Photographic Group
Jul 1942-Jan 1946
Thirteenth Air Force (South, Southwest Pacific)
Operated F-5 (P-38), F-10 (B-25)
Combat Photo-Reconnaissance

- 5th Reconnaissance Group

Constituted as 5th Photographic Group
Jul 1942-Oct 1945
Twelfth Air Force; Fifteenth Air Force (MTO)
Operated F-3 (A-20), F-4 (P-38), F-7 (B-24), F-9 (B-17), F-10 (B-25)
Combat Photo-Reconnaissance

- 6th Reconnaissance Group

Constituted as 6th Photographic Group
Feb 1943-Apr 1946
Fifth Air Force (Southwest Pacific)
Operated F-4/F-5 (P-38), F-7 (B-24), B-26
Combat Photo-Reconnaissance

- 7th Reconnaissance Group

Constituted as 7th Photographic Group
May 1943-Nov 1945
Eighth Air Force (ETO)
Operated Spitfire PR XI, P-51 (Escorts)
Combat Photo-Reconnaissance

- 8th Reconnaissance Group

Sep 1943-Nov 1945
Tenth Air Force (CBI)
Operated F-5 (P-38), F-6 (P-51), F-7 (B-24), P-40 (Escorts)
Combat Photo-Reconnaissance

- 9th Reconnaissance Group

Sep 1943-May 1944
Third Air Force (ZI)
Operated F-3 (A-20), F-4 (P-38), F-5 (P-38) F-7 (B-24), F-9 (B-17)
Operational Training Unit

- 10th Reconnaissance Group

Constituted as 73d Observation Group
Sep 1941-Jun 1948
Ninth Air Force (ETO)
Operated F-3 (A-20), F-5 (P-38), F-6 (P-51)
Combat Photo-Reconnaissance
Resesignated as USAF 10th Tactical Reconnaissance Group, Jun 1948

- 11th Photographic Group

Nov 1943-Oct 1944
HQ USAAF (ZI)
Squadrons deployed Worldwide
Squadrons deployed Worldwide Photo-Mapping; Combat Photo-Reconnaissance in CBI
Operated F-2 (C-45), F-3 (A-20), F-7 (B-24), F-9 (B-17), F-10 (B-25), F-13 (B-29)

- 25th Bombardment Group (Reconnaissance)

Jul 1944-Sep 1945
Eighth Air Force (ETO)
Operated Mosquito F-8-DH. Mosquito PR Mk XVI, F-5/P-38, F-7/B-24, F-9/B-17, F-10/B-25, B-26G Marauder (Night Reconnaissance)
Combat Photo-Reconnaissance, Weather Reconnaissance, Electronic Counter-Measures
Established as USAF 25th Tactical Reconnaissance Wing, July 1965

- 26th Reconnaissance Group

Aug 1941-Nov 1943; Dec 1946-Jun 1949
First Air Force; Third Air Force (ZI); Air Force Reserve
Operated F-3 (A-20), F-10 (B-25), P-39F-2
Operational Training Unit
Established as USAF 26th Strategic Reconnaissance Wing, May 1952

- 59th Reconnaissance Group

Constituted as 59th Observation Group
1941-1942;1943-1944
First Air Force; Third Air Force (ZI)
Operated Light Observation Aircraft, P-39F-2
Coastal patrols, Operational Training Unit

- 65th Reconnaissance Group

Constituted as 65th Observation Group
Aug 1941-Oct 1942; Mar-Aug 1943;Dec 1946-Jun 1949
Third Air Force (ZI); Air Force Reserve
Operated Light Observation Aircraft, F-10 (B-25)
Coastal patrols, Operational Training Unit

- 66th Reconnaissance Group

Constituted as 66th Observation Group
Aug 1941-Apr 1944; Dec 1946-May 1951
Third Air Force (ZI); Air Force Reserve
Operated F-3 (A-20), F-10 (B-25), P-39F-2, P-40
Operational Training Unit
Reactivated as USAF 66th Tactical Reconnaissance Group, Jan 1953

- 67th Reconnaissance Group

Constituted as 67th Observation Group
Sep 1941-Mar 1946
Eighth Air Force; Ninth Air Force (ETO)
Operated F-5 (P-38), F-6 (P-51), P-51 (Escorts)
Combat Photo-Reconnaissance
Reactivated as USAF 67th Tactical Reconnaissance Group, Jun 1948

- 68th Reconnaissance Group

Constituted as 68th Observation Group
Aug 1941-Jun 1944; Mar 1947-Jun 1949
Twelfth Air Force (MTO); Air Force Reserve
Operated Spitfire PR XI, F-3 (A-20), F-5 (P-38), F-6 (P-51), F-7 (B-24), F-9 (B-27), A-36, P-39F-2
Combat Photo-Reconnaissance
Reactivated as USAF 68th Tactical Reconnaissance Group, Oct 1951

- 69th Reconnaissance Group

Constituted as 69th Observation Group
Aug 1941-Jul 1946
Ninth Air Force (ETO)
Operated Mosquito PR Mk XVI, F-3 (A-20), F-5 (P-38), F-6 (P-51), F-10 (B-25), P-39F-2, P-40
Combat Photo-Reconnaissance

- 70th Reconnaissance Group

Constituted as 70th Observation Group
Aug 1941-Nov 1943; Mar 1947-Jun 1949
Second Air Force (ZI); Air Force Reserve
Operated F-3 (A-20), F-10 (B-25), P-39F-2
Operational Training Unit

- 71st Reconnaissance Group

Constituted as 71st Observation Group
Aug 1941-Feb 1946; Feb 1947-Apr 1949
Fifth Air Force (Southwest Pacific); Far East Air Forces (Occ Japan)
Operated F-5 (P-38), F-10 (B-25)
Combat Photo-Reconnaissance

- 72d Reconnaissance Group

Constituted as 72d Observation Group
Aug 1941-Nov 1943; May 1947-Jun 1949
Sixth Air Force (Caribbean); Air Force Reserve
Operated B-18
Antisubmarine Patrols, Photo-Mapping

- 74th Reconnaissance Group

Constituted as 74th Observation Group
Feb 1942-Nov 1945; Dec 1946-Jun 1949
Third Air Force (ZI); Air Force Reserve
Operated F-3 (A-20), F-6 (P-51), F-10 (B-25), P-40
Operational Training Unit

- 75th Reconnaissance Group

Constituted as 75th Observation Group
Feb 1942-May 1944
Third Air Force (ZI)
Operated F-3 (A-20), F-10 (B-25), F-6 (P-51), P-39F-2, P-40
Operational Training Unit
Established as 75th Tactical Reconnaissance Wing in May 1966

- 76th Reconnaissance Group

Constituted as 76th Observation Group
Feb 1942-Apr 1944
Third Air Force (ZI)
Operated F-3 (A-20), F-10 (B-25), P-39F-2, P-40
Operational Training Unit

- 77th Reconnaissance Group

Constituted as 77th Observation Group
Feb 1942-Nov 1943
Third Air Force (ZI); Detachment in India, Feb-Jul 1943
Operated F-3 (A-20), F-10 (B-25), P-39F-2, P-40
Operational Training Unit: Combat Photo-Reconnaissance

- 308th Reconnaissance Group (Weather)

Oct 1946-Jan 1951
Air Weather Service (MATS)
Operated WB-29
Weather Reconnaissance

- 363d Reconnaissance Group

Constituted as 363d Fighter Group
Sep 1944-Dec 1945; Jul 1946-Jun 1948
Ninth Air Force (ETO)
Operated F-5 (F-5), F-6, (P-51)
Combat Photo-Reconnaissance
Redesignated as USAF 363d Tactical Reconnaissance Group, Jun 1951

- 376th Reconnaissance Group

May 1947-Sep 1948
Strategic Air Command
Operated WB-29
Weather Reconnaissance

- 423d Reconnaissance Group

Constituted as 423d Observation Group
Mar-Apr 1943
Third Air Force (ZI)
Operated F-5 (F-38), F-6, (P-51)
Operational Training Unit

- 424th Reconnaissance Group

Constituted as 424th Observation Group
Mar-Apr 1943
Third Air Force (ZI)
Not fully organized, disbanded

- 426th Reconnaissance Group

Jul-Aug 1943
Third Air Force (ZI)
Not fully organized, disbanded

- 432d Reconnaissance Group

Constituted as 432d Observation Group
Feb-Nov 1943
Army Air Forces School of Applied Tactics (ZI)
Operated F-5 (F-5), F-6, (P-51), P-39F-2
Operational Training Unit
Reactivated as USAF 432d Tactical Reconnaissance Group, Jan 1954

== Wings ==
- 90th Reconnaissance Wing

Oct 1943-Oct 1945
Twelfth Air Force (MTO); Fifteenth Air Force (MTO)
Reactivated as USAF 90th Air Division (Reconnaissance), Apr 1948-Jun 1949

- 91st Reconnaissance Wing

Oct 1943-Jan 1946
Fifth Air Force (Southwest Pacific)
Reactivated as USAF 91st Air Division (Reconnaissance), Apr 1948-Jun 1949

- 311th Reconnaissance Wing

Jan 1944-Apr 1948
HQ USAAF
Units deployed Worldwide
Redesignated as USAF 311th Air Division (Reconnaissance), Apr 1948-Nov 1949

- 325th Reconnaissance Wing

Aug 1944-Oct 1945
Eighth Air Force (ETO)
Redesignated as USAF 325th Air Division (Reconnaissance), Apr 1948-Jun 1949
