= Oklahoma World War II Army Airfields =

Oklahoma World War II Army Airfields
- Part of World War II

Site information
- Type: Army Airfields

Location
- Map Of Oklahoma World War II Army Airfields

Site history
- Built: 1940–1944
- In use: 1940–present

During World War II, the United States Army Air Forces (AAF) established numerous airfields in Oklahoma for training pilots and aircrews of AAF fighters and bombers or as major maintenance and supply centers.

Most of these airfields were under the command of Third Air Force or the Army Air Forces Training Command (AAFTC) (a predecessor of the current-day United States Air Force Air Education and Training Command). However other AAF commands, including Second Air Force, Air Technical Service Command (ATSC) and Air Transport Command (ATC) commanded airfields in a support roles.

It is still possible to find remnants of these wartime airfields. Many were converted into municipal airports, some were returned to agriculture and several were retained as United States Air Force installations and were front-line bases during the Cold War. Hundreds of the temporary buildings that were used survive today, and are being used for other purposes.

== Major Airfields ==
Army Air Forces Training Command

- Altus Army Airfield, Altus
  AAF Central Flying Training Command
  2508th Army Air Forces Base Unit
  Now: Altus Air Force Base
- Chickasha Field, Chickasha
  AAF Central Flying Training Command
  2549th Army Air Forces Base Unit
  Now: Chickasha Municipal Airport (IATA: CHK, ICAO: KCHK)
- Cimarron Army Airfield, Cimmaron
  AAF Central Flying Training Command
  2508th Army Air Forces Base Unit
  Now: Clarence E. Page Municipal Airport (IATA: RCE, ICAO: KRCE)
- Enid Army Airfield, Enid
  AAF Central Flying Training Command
  2518th Army Air Forces Base Unit
  Now: Vance Air Force Base
- Frederick Army Airfield, Frederick
  AAF Central Flying Training Command
  2520th Army Air Forces Base Unit
  Now: Frederick Municipal Airport (IATA: FDR, ICAO: KFDR)
- Hatbox Army Airfield, Muskogee
  AAF Central Flying Training Command
  2557th Army Air Forces Base Unit
  Later: Hatbox Field (Closed)
- Miami Municipal Airport, Miami
  AAF Central Flying Training Command
  2556th Army Air Forces Base Unit
  Now: Miami Municipal Airport (IATA: MIO, ICAO: KMIO)
- Mustang Field, El Reno
  Central Flying Training Command
  2554th Army Air Forces Base Unit
  Now: El Reno Regional Airport (IATA: RQO, ICAO: KRQO)
- Ponca City Airport, Ponca City
  Central Flying Training Command
  323d Army Air Forces Flying Training Detachment
  Now: Ponca City Regional Airport (IATA: PNC, ICAO: KPNC)

Air Technical Service Command

- Tinker Field, Oklahoma City
  4136th Army Air Force Base Unit
  Now: Tinker Air Force Base

Second Air Force

- Ardmore Army Airfield, Ardmore
  222d Army Air Forces Base Unit
  Later: Ardmore Air Force Base (IATA: ADM, ICAO: KADM)
  Now: Ardmore Municipal Airport

Third Air Force

- Muskogee Army Airfield, Muskogee
  349th Army Air Forces Base Unit
  Now: Davis Field
- Will Rogers Field, Oklahoma City
  Joint Use USAAF/Civil Airport
  348th Army Air Forces Base Unit
  Now Will Rogers World Airport (IATA: OKC, ICAO: KOKC)
  and Will Rogers Air National Guard Base
- Woodward AAF
  Second Air Force until 1944
  Sub-field of Will Rogers Field
  354th Army Air Forces Base Unit
  Now: West Woodward Airport (IATA: WWR, ICAO: KWWR)

Air Transport Command

- Tulsa Municipal Airport, Tulsa
  582d Army Air Forces Base Unit
  Now: Tulsa International Airport
  and Tulsa Air National Guard Base (IATA: TUL, ICAO: KTUL)

Note: The former Clinton-Sherman Air Force Base, now Clinton-Sherman Industrial Airpark, was originally Naval Air Station Clinton as acquired by the U. S. Navy in 1942. NAS Clinton was closed at the end of World War II and turned over to the City of Clinton. It was on 15 September 1954 that the USAF leased the former NAS Clinton site from the City of Clinton to be used as an Air Force Base.
