= 47th Liaison Squadron =

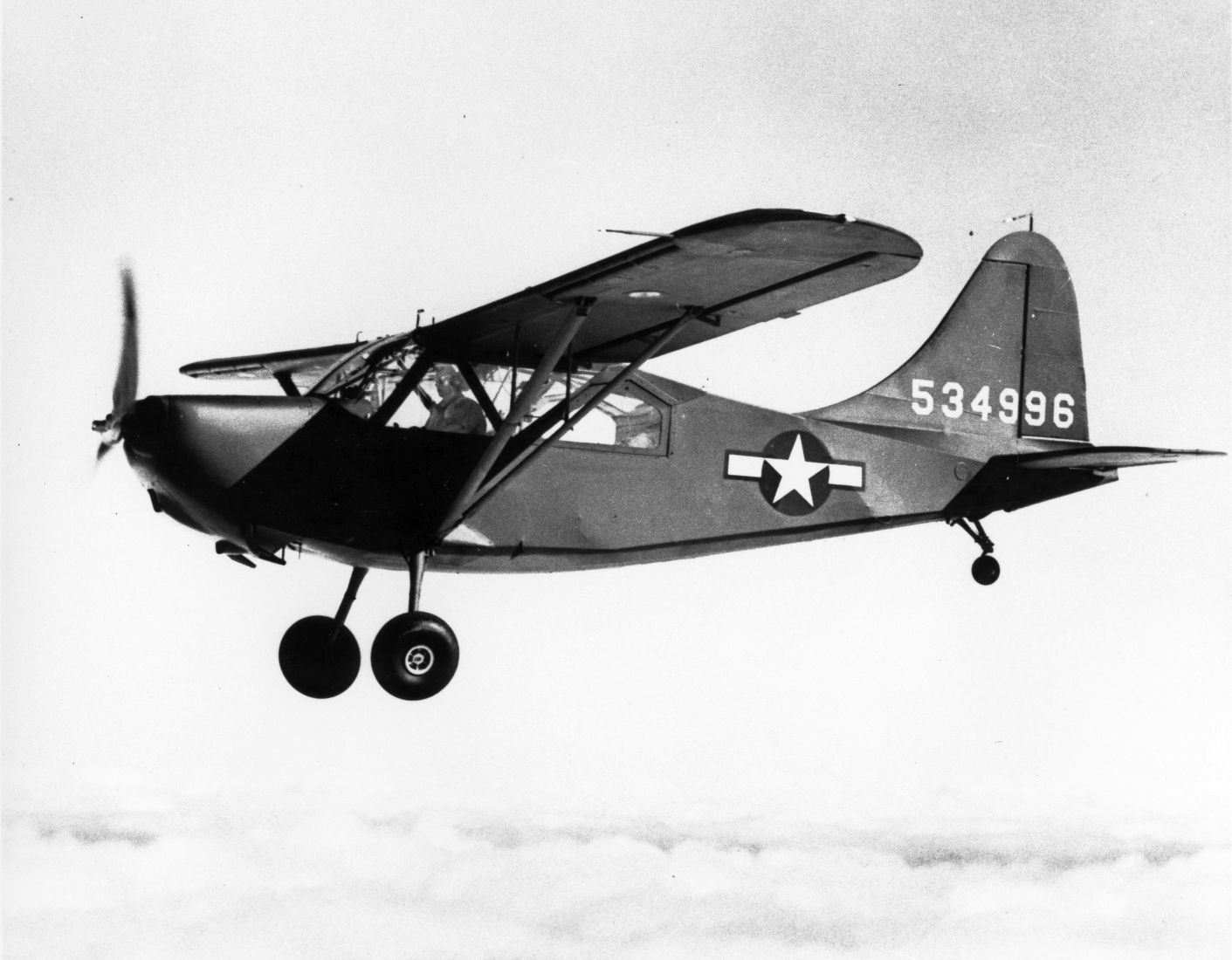
- L-5 Sentinel as flown by the squadron
- Active: 1943–1948
- Country: United States
- Branch: United States Air Force
- Role: Courier
- Engagements: European Theater of Operations

Insignia
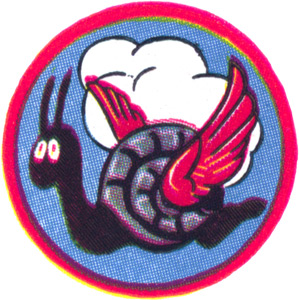
- 47th Liaison Squadron emblem (approved 19 January 1944)

The 47th Liaison Squadron is an inactive United States Air Force unit. Its last assignment was with Tactical Air Command at Langley Air Force Base, Virginia, where it was inactivated on 25 August 1948. The squadron was activated in July 1943. It trained in the United States until the spring of 1944, then deployed to the European Theater of Operations. It served as a courier and communication unit for various headquarters. After V-E Day, it remained in Germany as part of the occupation force until 1947, when it returned to the United States as a paper unit. It remained in that status until inactivating.

== History ==
The 47th Liaison Squadron was activated at Gainesville Army Air Field, Texas on 1 July 1943 as one of the four squadrons of the 426th Reconnaissance Group. The following month the squadron was reassigned to II Air Support Command, as the 426th Group was inactivated without fully equipping or being brought up to strength. The squadron was equipped with a variety of light aircraft, primarily Stinson L-5 Sentinels and Piper L-4 Grasshoppers, but it also flew a few Stinson L-1 Vigilants and Taylorcraft L-2 Grasshoppers. The 47th trained at bases in Texas and Louisiana until late March 1944, when it departed for the European Theater of Operations. Squadron training was informal and extended due to the absence of a formal training program until January 1944, and the absence of a definition of the squadron's mission. Because the squadron was nearing its overseas deployment, it received little benefit from the formal training program.

After its arrival at Cheltenham, England in early April 1944, the squadron moved to RAF Heston, west of London. From late May, six aircraft were detached to Oatlands Hill, near Stonehenge in Wiltshire. The squadron provided courier service for Headquarters Command, European Theater of Operations, U.S. Army until after D-Day, primarily with L-5 Sentinels. Other squadron missions included transport of personnel, aeromedical evacuation, visual reconnaissance, providing commanders with information to control advancing columns and checking passive air defense measures. In late July, one flight moved to the European continent, flying from Colombieres Airfield, France to support First Army Group. The squadron followed in August, when it moved to Saint-Sauveur-Lendelin. For the remainder of the war, it was attached to Twelfth Army Group.

Just before V-E Day, the squadron moved to Wiesbaden Air Base, Germany where it became part of the occupation forces. After August 1945, it was attached to attached to Headquarters Command, European Command and supported that headquarters until May 1947.

The squadron became non-operational and was moved to Langley Field, Virginia in June 1947. The squadron was not manned or equipped at Langley, and was finally inactivated on 25 August 1948.

== Lineage ==
- Constituted as the 47th Liaison Squadron on 25 June 1943

Activated on 1 July 1943
Inactivated on 25 August 1948

=== Assignments ===
- 426th Reconnaissance Group, 1 July 1943
- II Air Support Command (later II Tactical Air Division), 11 August 1943
- United States Strategic Air Forces in Europe, 4 April 1944 (attached to Headquarters Command, European Theater of Operations, United States Army, until 17 April 1944; then First Army Group until 9 August 1944; then to Twelfth Army Group)
- Ninth Air Force, 25 April 1944 (attached to Twelfth Army Group, until 1 August 1945; then to Headquarters Command, US Forces, European Theater)
- XII Tactical Air Command, 23 November 1945 (attached to Headquarters Command, US Forces, European Theater (later Headquarters Command, United States European Command))
- 70th Fighter Wing, 1 February 1946 (attached to Headquarters Command, European Command)
- 64th Fighter Wing, 4 March 1946 (attached to Headquarters Command, European Command)
- XII Tactical Air Command, 1 May 1947 (attached to Headquarters Command, European Command until 31 May 1947)
- Tactical Air Command, 25 June 1947 – 25 August 1948

=== Stations ===
- Gainesville Army Air Field, Texas, 1 July 1943
- Brownwood Army Air Field, Texas, 25 September 1943
- Pollock Army Air Field, Louisiana, 24 November 1943 – 21 March 1944
- Cheltenham, England, 9 April 1944
- RAF Heston (Sta 510), England, 25 April 1944

Flight at Colombieres Airfield, France, c. 24 July – c. 18 August 1944

- Saint-Sauveur-Lendelin, France, 18 August 1944
- Laval Airfield (A-57), France, 21 August 1944
- Buc Airfield (Y-4), France, September 2, 1944
- Verdun-Charney Airfield (Y-28), France, September 17, 1944
- Wiesbaden Air Base (Y-80), Germany, 5 May 1945

Flights operated from several points in Germany and Austria during period 21 July 1945 – 20 June 1947

- Frankfurt-Rebstock Airfield, Germany, 24 June 1946
- Langley Field (later Langley Air Force Base), Virginia, 25 June 1947 – 25 August 1948

=== Aircraft ===
- Stinson L-5 Sentinel, 1943-1947
- Piper L-4 Grasshopper, 1943-1944
- Stinson L-1 Vigilant, 1943-1944
- Taylorcraft L-2 Grasshopper, 1943-1944

=== Campaigns ===
Campaign Streamer	Campaign	Dates	Notes
	Northern France	25 July 1944–14 September 1944	
	Rhineland	15 September 1944–21 March 1945	
	Ardennes-Alsace	16 December 1944–25 January 1945	
	Central Europe	22 March 1944–21 May 1945	
	World War II Army of Occupation (Germany)	9 May 1945–25 June 1947	
