= El Reno Regional Airport =

El Reno Regional Airport Mustang Army Airfield
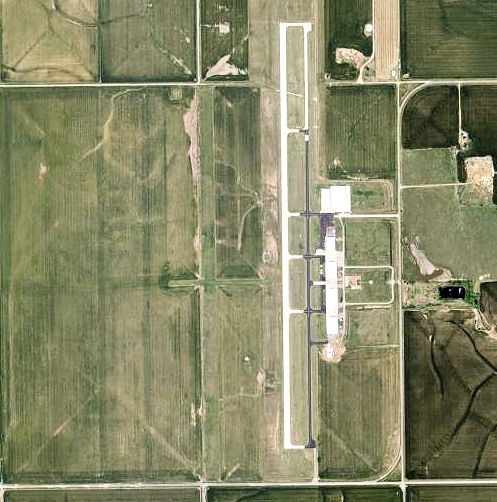
- 2006 USGS Orthophoto
- IATA: none; ICAO: KRQO; FAA LID: RQO

Summary
- Airport type: Public
- Owner: City of El Reno
- Serves: El Reno, Oklahoma
- Elevation AMSL: 1,420 ft (430 m)
- Coordinates: 35°28′22″N 098°00′21″W

Map
- Location

Runways
Direction	Length		Surface
Direction	ft	m	Surface
17/35	5,600	1,707	Concrete
18/36	4,630	1,411	Turf

Statistics (2008)
- Aircraft operations: 24,825
- Based aircraft: 24
- Source: Federal Aviation Administration

El Reno Regional Airport (ICAO: KRQO, FAA LID: RQO) is in Canadian County, Oklahoma, United States, five miles southwest of El Reno, which owns it. The FAA's National Plan of Integrated Airport Systems for 2009–2013 categorized it as a general aviation facility.

Many U.S. airports use the same three-letter location identifier for the FAA and IATA, but this facility is RQO to the FAA and has no IATA code.

== History ==
In March 1942, citizens of El Reno approved a bond issue to fund the construction of an airport to be used by the Army Air Forces for pilot training. The city appropriated the first portion of 640 acres (260 ha) of land in early June and by the end of the month construction of the airport had begun. Construction of the first 14,000-square-foot (1,300 m^{2}) hangar was intended to be completed by early August – allowing airplanes to be moved from the nearby Cimarron Field. However, muddy conditions, lack of earthmoving equipment and inability to obtain supplies caused setbacks. Flight operations at the airstrip were due to begin in October 1942, although cadets were to remain living at Cimarron Field.

The approval of the airport to become a complete training school independent of Cimmarron Field was announced on 14 January 1943 and the first class of cadets arrived the following day. At the same time, its name was changed from El Reno Field to Mustang Field to prevent confusion with the nearby Fort Reno. Plans specified the construction of nine barracks, a mess hall and recreation building, hospital, administration building, ground school structure and two additional hangars.

The field served as a United States Army Air Forces World War II primary pilot training airfield by the Army Air Forces Training Command Gulf Coast Training Center (later Central Flying Training Command). It was operated by the 320th Flying Training detachment, with the Midwest Air School as a contract flying training provider. The Oklahoma Air College, Inc. also was a contractor to the USAAF at El Reno. Fairchild PT-19s were the primary trainer. Also had several PT-17 Stearmans and a few P-40 Warhawks assigned.

By mid May, the frame of two additional hangars had been erected, but not yet completed due to delays in obtaining the steel siding. As a result, when a storm struck the airfield, 18 airplanes tied down outside were damaged. (Note: One additional plane parked inside an existing hangar was also damaged when a portion of the hangar door fell on it.) Work to finish the hangars began before the month was out. By early July, the airport had become known as "Dustang Field" due to the amount of dust created by site preparation. As a result, three neighboring landowners sued the city and federal governments, among others, for damages to their fields.

During wartime, the airfield had three runways, two north-south and one east-west. It had several (between 3 and 6) local auxiliary landing fields for emergency or overflow landings. Known auxiliaries were at Calumet and Union City with several others in the El Reno area.

The 320th Flying Training Detachment was redesignated the 2554th Army Air Forces Base Unit on 1 May 1944. Paving of the road from El Reno to the airport was underway in late July. In August, it was one of only 14 out of a total of 63 civilian contract schools to be retained by the Army Air Force. However, only three months later this was reversed, with the contract to end in late December. At the start of 1945, it was announced that it would instead become a repair and storage depot for training airplanes. The airfield was turned over to the city on 29 June 1946. That October, the Federal Public Housing Authority signed a contract to convert four barracks into temporary housing for returning soldiers.

Hangar 3 was tentatively rented to Cheyenne Mobile Homes Incorporated in July 1957.

A bond issue to fund improvements to the airport was placed on the ballot by the city council in 1963.

An aviation museum called the Caldwell Collection at Mustang Field announced it would be opening in one of the original World War II hangars in January 2025. By October 2026, the collection had begun disassembling a second World War II structure, Hangar 1, in preparation to reconstruct it as two separate hangars adjacent to the first one.

== Facilities ==
The airport covers 698 acres (282 ha) an elevation of 1,420 feet (433 m). It has two runways: 17/35 is 5,600 by 75 feet (1,707 x 23 m) concrete and 18/36 is 4,630 by 190 feet (1,411 x 58 m) turf.

In the year ending February 12, 2008 the airport had 24,825 aircraft operations, average 68 per day: 99.9% general aviation and 0.1% military. 24 aircraft were then based at the airport: 79% single-engine and 21% multi-engine.

== Accidents and incidents ==
- On 19 April 1943, a PT-19A crashed at the airport, killing an instructor and student.
- On 20 May 1943, two PT-19s crashed in separate accidents, killing two instructors and one student and inuring a fourth individual.

== Operations ==
=== Tornadoes ===
El Reno Regional Airport has been hit or came close to being hit by multiple tornadoes over the years.

On April 24, 2006, a short lived, anti-cyclonic, open air funnel tornado hit the airport directly. Although rated a weak F1 tornado on the Fujita scale, it did heavy damage to 2 hangars, and damaged multiple airplanes, causing $1.5 million dollars in damage.

On May 8, 2007, an EF1 tornado touched down just east of the airport. This tornado was on the ground for 1.8 miles and was 150 yards wide. It did not directly affect the airport.

On May 31, 2013, the airport was barely spared by one of the strongest tornadoes ever recorded when the 2013 El Reno tornado passed less than a mile south of the airports runway. This multiple vortex tornado became the widest tornado ever recorded at 2.6 miles across.

=== Mineral rights lease ===
Every three years El Reno conducts a bidding for mineral rights on 320 acres (130 ha) of airport land. This is required because the city acquired the facility years ago from the Federal Aviation Administration. The proceeds must be used for either improvements at El Reno airport or other aviation-related purposes. The winning bid was made by Haggard Land Company, which offered $15,000 per acre plus a 20 percent royalty for any oil or gas it extracts from the land. The reported value of the deal to the city was $4,800,000. Mayor Matt White said his goal was to pay off the airport debt, currently estimated at $600,000.

== See also ==
- Oklahoma World War II Army Airfields
- 31st Flying Training Wing (World War II)
