= 553d Reconnaissance Squadron =

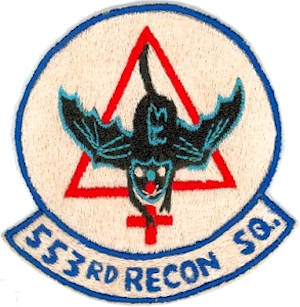
- Emblem of the 553d Reconnaissance Squadron
- Active: 1942-1945; 1967-1971
- Country: United States
- Branch: United States Air Force

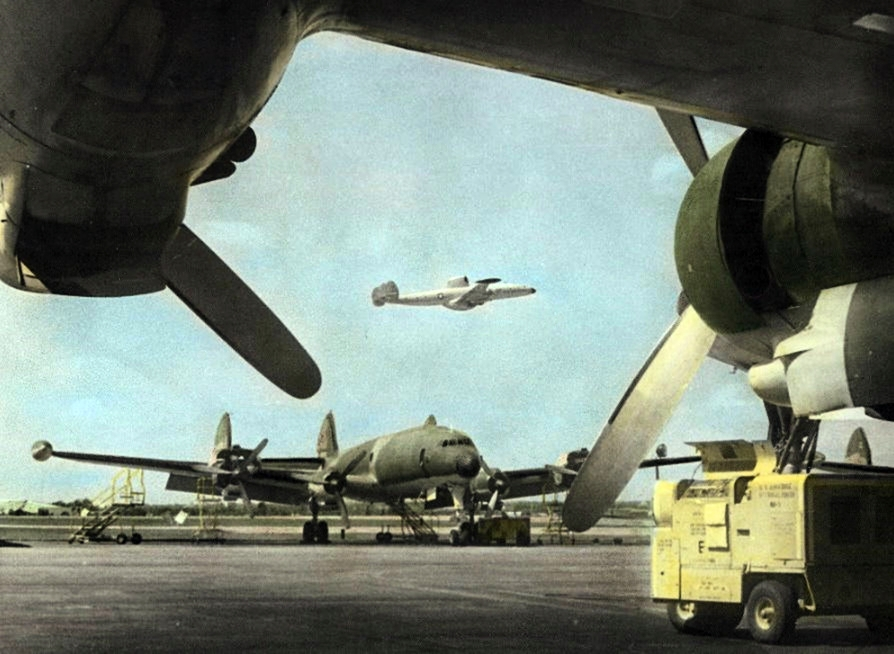
Lockheed EC-121D Warning Star takes off from Korat Royal Thai Air Force Base, Thailand, in the late 1960s.

The 553d Reconnaissance Squadron is an inactive United States Air Force unit. It was last assigned to the 388th Tactical Fighter Wing and stationed at Korat Royal Thai Air Force Base. It was first active during World War II as the 10th Photographic Reconnaissance Squadron.

== History ==
Constituted in 1942 as the 10th Photographic Squadron, the squadron conducted replacement training in Oklahoma for aircrew and photographic technicians.

Established as the 553d Reconnaissance Squadron in 1967 at Otis AFB, Massachusetts. Moved to Thailand as an electronic warfare squadron to detect vehicles along the Ho Chi Minh Trail in Indochina. If enemy vehicles could be detected then stopped, then a major quantity of enemy supplies into South Vietnam would be halted.

The "electronic fence" concept envisioned using Navy sonobuoys delivered along the Ho Chi Minh Trail by air, with special receivers in the 553d Reconnaissance Wing EC-121 aircraft to pick up the signals. The EC-121 would, when in range, automatically relay the signals picked up to the Infiltration Center at Nakhon Phanom RTAFB. Several target areas along the Ho Chi Minh Trail were outside of the range of the relay equipment; during out of range flights the signals were processed manually by the crew on board the EC-121R, then radioed via High Frequency Single Side Band radio directly to Seventh Air Force Headquarters in Saigon, South Vietnam.

The 553rd Reconnaissance Squadron was known as The "Batcats".

== Lineage ==
10th Photographic Reconnaissance Squadron

- Constituted as the 10th Photographic Squadron on 7 May 1942

Activated on 14 May 1942
Redesignated 10th Photographic Reconnaissance Squadron on 9 June 1942
Redesignated 10th Photographic Squadron (Light) on 6 February 1943
Redesignated 10th Photographic Reconnaissance Squadron on 11 August 1943

- Disbanded on 1 May 1944.
- Reconstituted on 19 September 1985 and consolidated with the 553d Reconnaissance Squadron as the 553d Tactical Intelligence Squadron

553d Tactical Intelligence Squadron

- Constituted as 553d Reconnaissance Squadron and activated on 9 February 1967 (not organized)

Organized on 25 February 1967 (not operational until 28 February)
Inactivated on 31 December 1971.

- Consolidated with the 10th Photographic Reconnaissance Squadron as the 553d Tactical Intelligence Squadron (not active under this designation)

=== Assignments ===
- 2d Photographic Group (later 2d Photographic Reconnaissance and Mapping Group, 2d Photographic Reconnaissance Group), 14 May 1942 - 1 May 1944
- Air Defense Command, 8 February 1967 (not organized)
- 553d Reconnaissance Wing, 25 February 1967
- 388th Tactical Fighter Wing, 15 December 1970 – 31 December 1971 (not operational after 6 December 1971)

=== Stations ===
- Colorado Springs: Colorado, 14 May 1942
- Will Rogers Field, Oklahoma: 13 October 1943
- Woodward Army Air Field: Oklahoma, 11 December 1943
- Will Rogers Field, Oklahoma: 13 Mar 1944 - 1 May 1944
- Otis Air Force Base: Massachusetts, 25 February 1967
- Korat Royal Thai Air Force Base: Thailand, 31 October 1967 – 31 December 1971

=== Aircraft ===
- Lockheed P-38 Lightning (and F-4 and F-5 reconnaissance models), 1942-1944
- North American B-25 Mitchell (and F-10 reconnaissance model), 1942-1944
- Lockheed EC-121 Warning Star, 1967-1971
