= Clarence E. Page Municipal Airport =

Airport in Canadian County, Oklahoma, US

Clarence E. Page Municipal Airport Cimarron Army Airfield
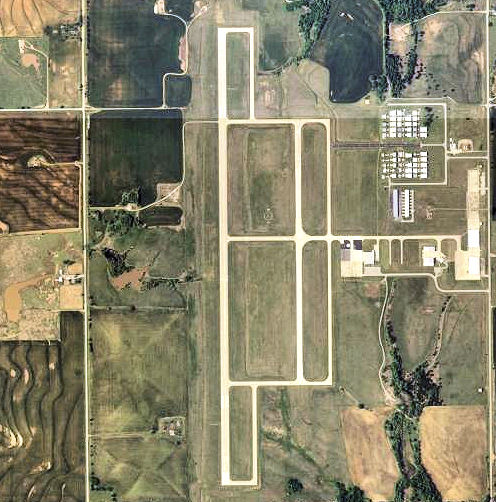
- 2006 USGS Orthophoto
- IATA: none; ICAO: KRCE; FAA LID: RCE

Summary
- Airport type: Public
- Owner: City of Oklahoma City
- Serves: Oklahoma City, Oklahoma
- Location: Oklahoma City, Canadian County, Oklahoma
- Elevation AMSL: 1,354 ft (413 m)
- Coordinates: 35°29′17″N 97°49′25″W

Map
- Location of Clarence E. Page Municipal Airport

Runways
| Direction | Length | | Surface |
| Direction | ft | m | Surface |
|---|---|---|---|
| 17R/35L | 6,014 | 1,833 | Concrete |
| 17L/35R | 3,502 | 1,067 | Concrete |

Statistics (2008)
- Aircraft operations: 25,000
- Based aircraft: 52
- Source: Federal Aviation Administration

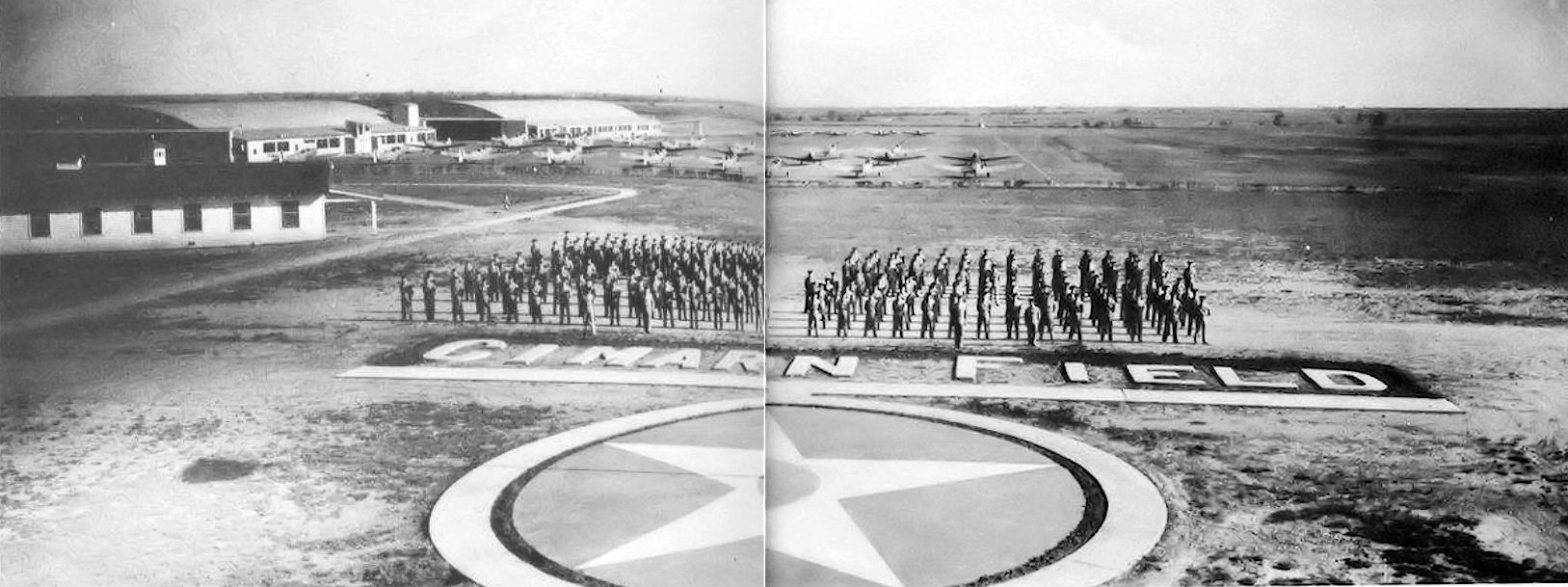
Photo of graduates of the Army Air Forces contract flight school at Cimarron Field, Oklahoma, 1944

Cimarron Field 1944 USAAF Classbook

Clarence E. Page Municipal Airport (ICAO: KRCE, FAA LID: RCE, formerly F29) is a public-use airport owned by the city of Oklahoma City and located in Canadian County, Oklahoma, United States. It is 15 nautical miles (28 km) west of the central business district of Oklahoma City, but still within its city limits. This airport is included in the FAA's National Plan of Integrated Airport Systems (2009–2013), which categorizes it as a general aviation airport.

Although most U.S. airports use the same three-letter location identifier for the FAA and IATA, this airport is assigned RCE by the FAA but has no designation from the IATA (which assigned RCE to Roche Harbor Seaplane Base in Washington.).

== Facilities and aircraft ==
Clarence E. Page Municipal Airport covers an area of 1,000 acres (400 ha) at an elevation of 1,354 feet (413 m) above mean sea level. It has two runways with concrete surfaces: 17R/35L is 6,014 by 100 feet (1,833 x 30 m) and 17L/35R is 3,502 by 75 feet (1,067 x 23 m).

For the 12-month period ending July 2, 2008, the airport had 25,000 aircraft operations, an average of 68 per day, all of which were general aviation. At that time there were 52 aircraft based at this airport: 73% single-engine, 2% multi-engine, 6% helicopter and 19% ultralight.

== History ==
Opened in October, 1941, the airport conducted contract basic flying training for the United States Army Air Forces. Known as Cimarron Field, the wartime airport had five grass runways, with the runways being changed at various times, with three auxiliary airfields used for emergency and overflow landings/takeoffs. The contractor was Oklahoma Air College, Inc. Flying training was performed with Fairchild PT-19s as the primary trainer. Several PT-17 Stearmans and a few P-40 Warhawks were also assigned to Cimarron Field.

Cimarron Field was inactivated on 27 June 1944 with the drawdown of AAFTC's pilot training program. The airfield was turned over to civil control at the end of the war though the War Assets Administration (WAA).

This airport hosted the 18th World Aerobatic Championship from 18 to 30 August 1996.

== See also ==
Other airports owned by Oklahoma City include:

- Will Rogers World Airport, served by seven major airlines, regional and charter airlines
- Wiley Post Airport, a corporate and business jet general aviation airport
- Oklahoma World War II Army Airfields
- 31st Flying Training Wing (World War II)
