= Frankfurt-Rebstock Airfield =

Former airport in Frankfurt, Germany (1912–1945)

Frankfurt-Rebstock Airfield (Y-75)
- Frankfurt, Germany

Site information
- Type: Military airfield
- Owner: Luftwaffe
- Controlled by: Airfield Command of Fl.H.Kdtr. A(o) 9/XII Rhein-Main, April-June 1944, Airfield Command of Fl.H.Kdtr. A(o) 25/VII Rhein-Main, 1944

Location
- Coordinates: 50°06′36″N 8°36′59″E

Site history
- Built: 1912
- In use: 1909 - 1945
- Demolished: 27 March 1945
- Battles/wars: World War II

Airfield information
Runways
Direction	Length and surface
08/26	3,300 metres (10,827 ft) grass

Frankfurt-Rebstock Airfield was a German Luftwaffe airport located in the city of Frankfurt, Germany. It was built in 1912 and closed in 1945.

== History ==
Established in 1912, the airfield’s origins trace back to the 1909 Internationale Luftschiffahrt Ausstellung (ILA), an aviation fair where demonstrations of airships and aircraft were held. The airfield was situated near the Frankfurt Messe grounds, initially intended as an airship port, but soon expanded to accommodate "heavier-than-air" aircraft as well.

After World War I, the airfield expanded, with Deutsche Lufthansa, servicing their flights, making it one of Germany’s most important airports, only behind Berlin Tempelhof Airport. However, as aircraft grew larger, and the city "creeping" up on the airfield, Frankfurt-Rebstock Airport’s capacity was limited. Since 1931, the airfield held many air shows, and by 1933, a search for a new airport begun as there was no room for expansion. In 1933, the Nazi regime pushed for the rapid construction of a more modern airport, which resulted in the opening of Frankfurt Rhein-Main Airport in 1936.

=== World War II ===
Frankfurt-Rebstock Airfield was decommissioned as a civilian airfield in 1935, however, it was used by the Luftwaffe. In 1938, the airfield served as a factory airport, operated by the Gerner-Flugzeusbau firm. During World War II, the airfield faced heavy bombings by Allied forces. From 15 April – 30 May 1945 during the Central Europe Campaign, the airfield was designated as Advanced Landing Ground Y-75. On 27 March 1945, the airfield was ordered to immediately be evacuated and destroyed.

=== Units ===
The following stationed, operation, and command units based at the airfield. Operational Units

- Headquarters, I./JG 334, March-May 1937
- 2nd Squadron (Fighter), Aufklärung Gruppe 123, September-November 1939
- 1st Squadron (Fighter), Aufklärung Gruppe, 22 August 1939 – May 1940
- Headquarters, I./JG 2, November 1939 – May 1940
- III./JG 2 (April-May 1940)
- 4th Squadron, Group South (Aircraft Transfer Wing 1), 1943

Station Commands:

- FI.H.Kdtr. (E) Rebstock (August 1939 – March 1940)
- Fl.H.Kdtr. E 17/XII (March 1940)
- Airfield Command of Fl.H.Kdtr. A(o) 9/XII Rhein-Main, April-June 1944
- Airfield Command of Fl.H.Kdtr. A(o) 25/VII Rhein-Main, 1944

Station Units:

- 3rd Company, Light Flak Battalion 987, March 1944

After the war, the airfield was permanently closed, relocating operations to Frankfurt Rhein-Main. Despite being abandoned in the 1950s, military helicopters were occasionally operating at the airfield.

=== Present day ===
The eastern portion of the former airfield became a parking lot for the Frankfurt Messe, while the western side was turned into a park. The surrounding area is now undergoing urban redevelopment, with no remnants of the airfield.
