= Third Air Force =

Numbered air force of the United States Air Force responsible for the European region

Third Air Force (Air Forces Europe)
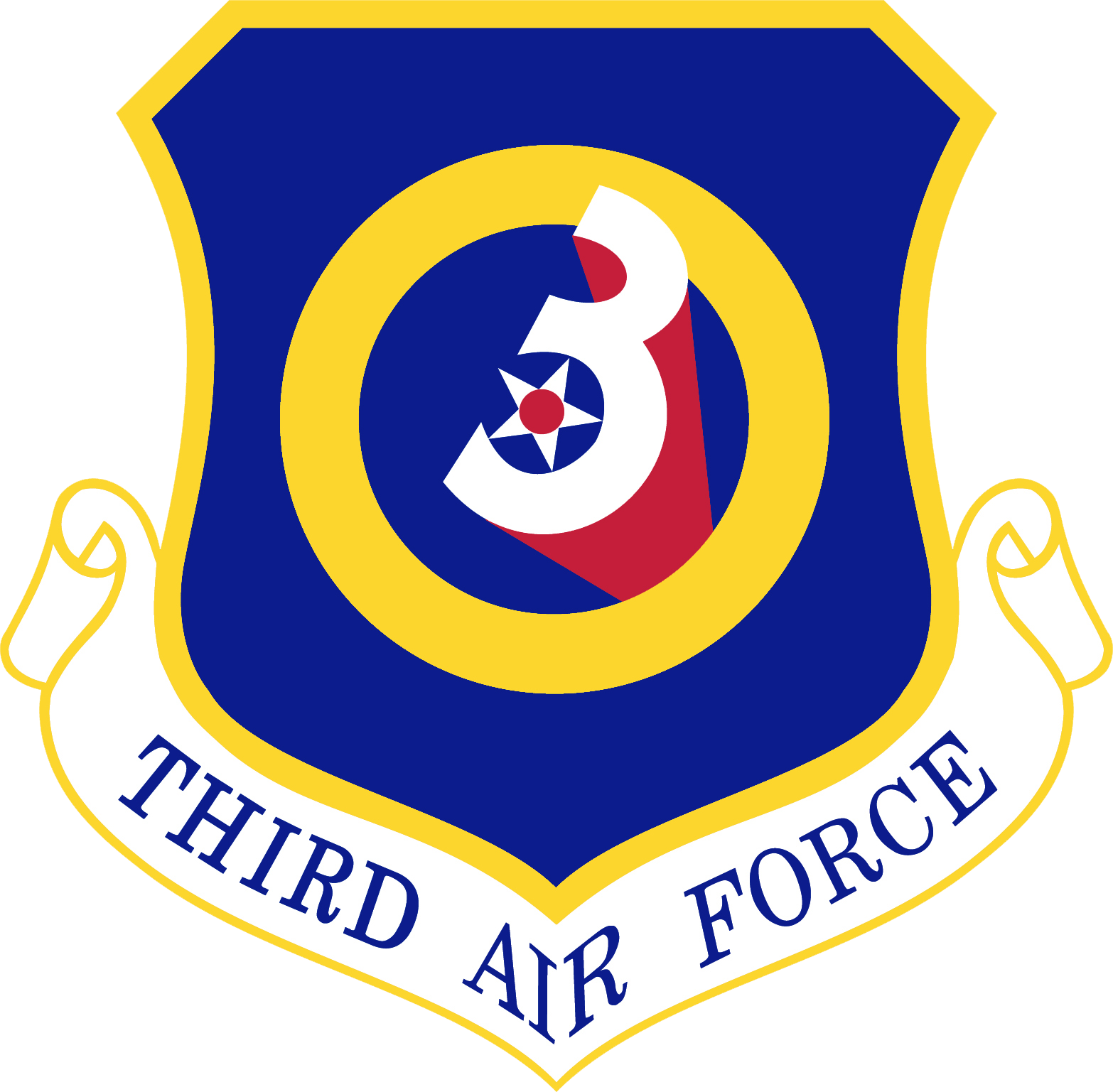
- Shield of the Third Air Force
- Active: 1 December 2006 – present (as Third Air Force (Air Forces Europe)); 1 May 1951 – 1 November 2005 (as Third Air Force); 26 March 1941 – 1 November 1946 (as Third Air Force); 18 December 1940 – 26 March 1941 (as Southeast Air District) (c. 80 years) (Note: This is the sum of all above periods, not a time span from first activation to this day.)
- Country: United States of America
- Branch: United States Air Force (18 September 1947 – present); United States Army ( Army Air Forces, 20 June 1941 – 18 September 1947; Army Air Corps 19 October 1940 – 20 June 1941)
- Type: Numbered Air Force
- Role: Provides combat-ready air forces for U.S. European Command and U.S. African Command
- Part of: United States Air Forces in Europe; United States Air Forces Africa; U.S. European Command; U.S. African Command
- Headquarters: Ramstein Air Base, Rhineland-Palatinate, Germany
- Motto: Develop - Defend - Deliver
- Engagements: World War II – American Theater Kosovo War – Air Campaign

- Decorations: Air Force Outstanding Unit Award
- Website: www.usafe.af.mil/About-Us/3rd-Air-Force/

Commanders
- Commander: Lt Gen Paul Moga
- Vice Commander: Col Matthew A. Bartlett
- Command Chief: CCM Jason K. Trickey
- WWII Commander: Maj Gen Walter H. Frank
- Notable commanders: Lewis H. Brereton; Roscoe C. Wilson; Francis H. Griswold; William D. Dunham; Frank L. Gailer Jr.

The Third Air Force (Air Forces Europe) (3 AF) is a numbered air force of the United States Air Forces in Europe - Air Forces Africa (USAFE-AFAFRICA). Its headquarters is Ramstein Air Base, Germany. It is responsible for all U.S. air forces in Europe and Africa, and operations and support activities in the U.S. European Command and U.S. Africa Command's areas of responsibility. It also has a unique mission as the U.S. military's primary liaison to the British government, which is conducted through the command's 3 AF-UK headquarters at RAF Mildenhall, England.

One of the four original pre–World War II numbered air forces, it was established on 26 March 1941, at Tampa, Florida with a mission of air defense of the Southeastern United States and Gulf Coast regions. During the war, its primary mission became the organization and training of combat units prior to their deployment to the overseas combat air forces. Several airfields are associated with the Third Air Force.

== Units ==
Major operational units under Third Air Force are:

- 31st Fighter Wing, Aviano Air Base, Italy (F-16C/D Block 40, HH-60)
- 39th Air Base Wing, Incirlik Air Base, Turkey
- 48th Fighter Wing, RAF Lakenheath, United Kingdom (F-15E, F-35A)
- 52nd Fighter Wing, Spangdahlem Air Base, Germany (F-16C/D Block 50)
- 86th Airlift Wing, Ramstein Air Base, Germany (C-130, C-21A, C-37A)
- 100th Air Refueling Wing, RAF Mildenhall, United Kingdom (KC-135R)
- 406th Air Expeditionary Wing, Ramstein Air Base, Germany (C-130, MQ-9)
- 435th Air Ground Operations Wing, Ramstein Air Base, Germany
- 501st Combat Support Wing, RAF Alconbury, United Kingdom
- Heavy Airlift Wing, Pápa Air Base, Hungary (C-17)

== History ==
One of the four original numbered air forces, Third Air Force was activated as the Southeast Air District of the GHQ Air Force on 18 December 1940 (which became Air Force Combat Command on 20 June 1941), at MacDill Field, Florida. The District was originally constituted on 19 October 1940, and that same day, the 22nd Pursuit Wing was also constituted. Activated about November 1940 at Savannah, Georgia, the Wing was assigned supervision of the 50th and 53d Pursuit Groups (15 January 1941), but was inactivated in October 1941.

The Southeast Air District was redesignated Third Air Force on 26 March 1941 with a mission for the defense of the Southeast and Gulf of Mexico regions of the United States. It moved to offices in downtown Tampa on 8 January 1941.

MacDill Field was one of two major Army Air Corps bases established in the Tampa Bay area in the buildup prior to World War II. Tampa's Drew Field Municipal Airport, established in 1928 was leased by the Air Corps in 1940. A major expansion of the airport was initiated and Drew Army Airfield was opened in 1941. Two secondary Army Airfields, Brooksville Army Airfield and Hillsborough Army Airfield were built and opened in early 1942 to support the flight operations of MacDill and Drew Fields. The Bonita Springs Auxiliary Field, located near Fort Myers provided an additional emergency landing field for MacDill. All of these airfields came under the jurisdiction of Third Air Force. III Fighter Command, the fighter arm, was headquartered at Drew Field.

=== Second World War ===
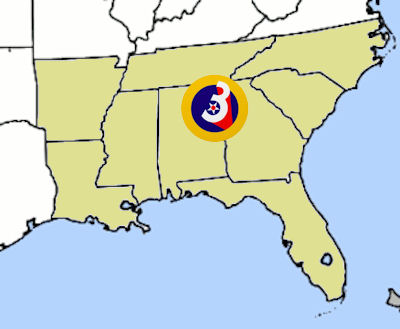
Third Air Force region of the United States, Second World War

Third Air Force initially provided air defense for the southeastern United States (1940–1941) and flew antisubmarine patrols along coastal areas of the Atlantic Ocean and Gulf of Mexico after Pearl Harbor. In January 1942, the command was withdrawn by Air Force Combat Command from the Eastern Defense Command and assigned operational training of units, crews, and replacements for medium bombardment, fighter, and reconnaissance operations.

In 1942, the antisubmarine patrols were turned over to the Coast Guard and other agencies and the command was engaged primarily in training replacements for combat units and operational training of units, crews, and individuals for bombardment, fighter, and reconnaissance operations. It received graduates of Army Air Forces Training Command flight schools; navigator training; flexible gunnery schools and various technical schools, organized them into combat groups and squadrons, and provided operational unit training (OTU) and replacement training (RTU) to prepare groups and replacements for deployment overseas to combat theaters. Third Air Force primarily trained North American B-25 Mitchell and Martin B-26 Marauder medium bomber groups and Douglas A-20 Havoc and North American A-36 Apache light bomber groups. It also trained replacement fighter pilots, initially using Bell P-39 Airacobra and Curtiss P-40 Warhawks in 1942, later with Republic P-47 Thunderbolts and North American P-51 Mustangs beginning in 1943 and 1944 as they became available. Third Air Force also provided support to the Army Air Forces School of Applied Tactics in Florida. By 1944, most of the Operational Training of groups ended, with the command concentrating on RTU training using Army Air Force Base Units (AAFBU) as training organizations at the airfields controlled by Third Air Force.

Also by 1944, the majority of the Numbered Air Forces of the AAF were fighting in various parts of the world, such as the Eighth Air Force in Europe and the Twentieth Air Force in the Pacific. They were supported by four numbered air forces located within the United States. On 13 December 1944, First, Second, Third and Fourth Air Force were all placed under the unified command of the Continental Air Forces, the predecessor of the later established Strategic Air Command, Tactical Air Command, and Air Defense Command, which were all established in 1946.

=== From 1945 and Cold War ===
When the Army Air Forces reorganized in 1946, Tactical Air Command (TAC) was established as one of its three major commands. Third Air Force was reassigned to TAC to control the troop carrier units formerly part of IX Troop Carrier Command. It was headquartered at Greenville Army Air Base, South Carolina. The Curtiss C-46 Commando and Douglas C-47 Skytrain were the primary troop carrier aircraft, but surplus Douglas C-54 Skymasters that had been originally purchased for the Air Transport Command were made available for troop carrier use. Third Air Force was inactivated on 1 November 1946.

TAC's troop carrier mission was reassigned to Ninth Air Force with its return from Europe and reassignment to Greenville AAF, which had been renamed Donaldson Air Force Base in the interim.

In August 1948, in response to the Berlin Blockade, the U.S. deployed long-range Boeing B-29 Superfortress strategic bombers to four UK bases in East Anglia. The 3d Air Division was activated to receive, support and operationally control the B-29 units deployed in the United Kingdom. It also provided aircraft maintenance support at RAF Burtonwood for Douglas C-54 Skymaster aircraft used in the Berlin Airlift. When the Berlin Airlift ended in 1949, the division participated in the Military Assistance Program in the United Kingdom and began an extensive air base construction program through May 1951.

Briefly elevated to the Major Command level from 3 January 1949 – 21 January 1951, the 3d Air Division controlled large numbers of USAF organizations based in the United Kingdom and supervised a tremendous airfield construction program.

=== Reactivation from 1951 ===
However, with the advent of the Korean War and the growing Cold War threat of the Soviet Union, the U.S. and UK agreed to an even greater U.S. military presence in the United Kingdom. The resulting growing size and complexity of the American military presence required a larger command and organizational structure that could meet the needs of the increased operations.

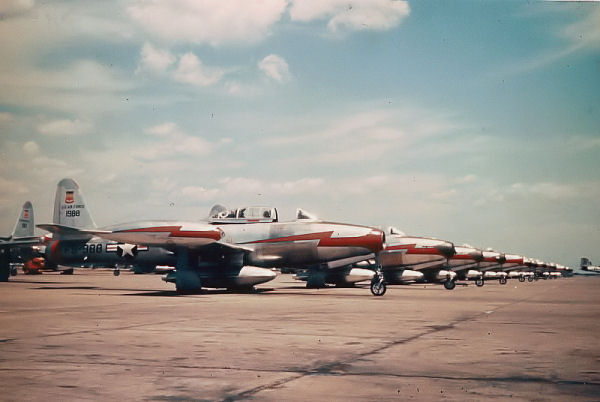
F-84Gs of the 77th Tactical Fighter Squadron, RAF Wethersfield

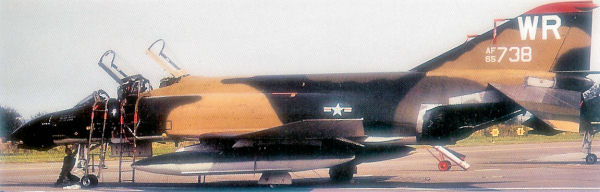
McDonnell F-4D-28-MC Phantom Serial 65-0738 at RAF Bentwaters, September 1972.

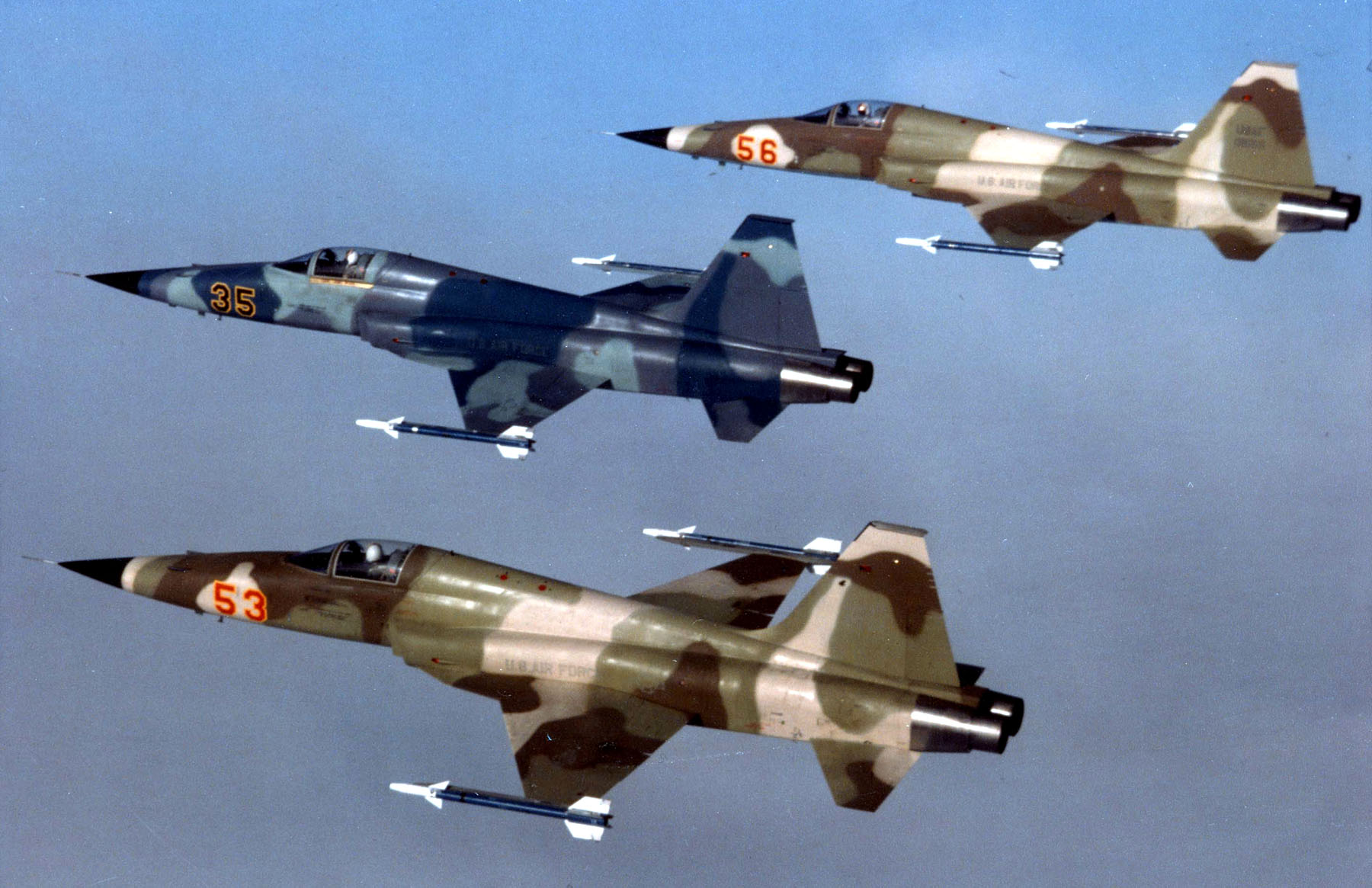
Northrop F-5E Tiger II Serials 73–0953, 0956 and 0985 of the 527th TFTAS in formation at RAF Alconbury, 1977

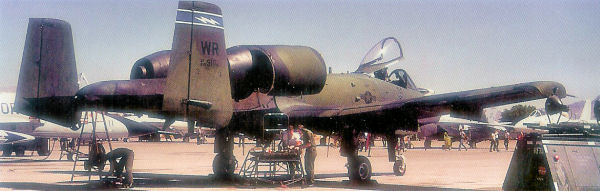
A-10A Serial 81-0991 at RAF Bentwaters.

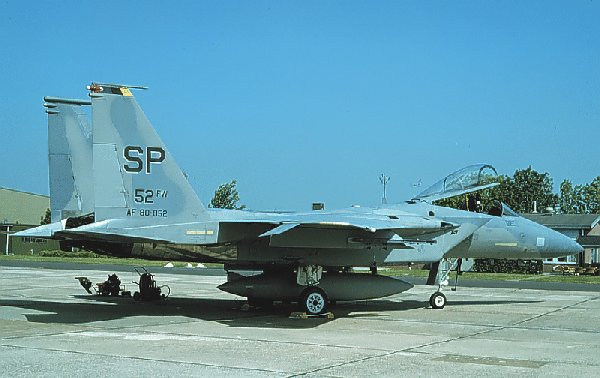
F-15C Serial 80-082, 53d Fighter Squadron, Spangdahlem Air Base

The 3d Air Division was discontinued on 1 May 1951, and in its place the USAFE Third Air Force was activated to oversee tactical air operations. Strategic Air Command's 7th Air Division controlled deployed bombardment and reconnaissance forces with Third Air Force providing its logistical support. From its headquarters at RAF South Ruislip near London, Third Air Force carried out that mission basically unchanged through 1966, when the 7th Air Division was inactivated.

The first tactical unit to come to England under Third Air Force was the 81st Fighter-Bomber Wing based at RAF Bentwaters on 6 September 1951. The next assigned unit was the 20th Fighter-Bomber Wing, flying from RAF Wethersfield. These Republic F-84 Thunderjet/Thunderchief and North American F-86 Sabre units worked with Royal Air Force Fighter Command providing air defense for England. In addition, the attached Tactical Air Command 47th Bombardment Wing flew B-45 Tornado and B-66 Destroyer tactical bombers from RAF Sculthorpe and RAF Alconbury.

Initially the 49th Air Division functioned as the intermediate-level command authority for USAFE's wings in the UK, no operational combat groups were attached. The division supervised and participated in numerous training missions such as Quick Shot, Kingpin, and Bear Claw. It was inactivated on 1 July 1956.

During the 1960s, Third Air Force had four to five combat wings and major changes occurred in the types of aircraft deployed in the United Kingdom. North American F-100 Super Sabres, McDonnell F-101 Voodoos, and McDonnell Douglas F-4 Phantom IIs replaced older fighter aircraft. Boeing KC-135 Stratotankers replaced older refueling aircraft.

In June 1972, daily operational control of tactical units in the United Kingdom was transferred to Headquarters USAFE at Wiesbaden Air Base, West Germany. Third Air Force still retained command of the units, but as a result of the change, the headquarters was reorganized, reduced in personnel strength, and moved to RAF Mildenhall, United Kingdom.

In 1979, NATO ministers decided to deploy BGM-109G Gryphon Ground Launched Cruise and Pershing II IRBM missiles to counter the growing Soviet SS-20 intermediate range ballistic missile threat. RAF Greenham Common and RAF Molesworth were selected as the beddown sites for the GLCM. The 501st Tactical Missile Wing (TMW) was activated at RAF Greenham Common in July 1982 and the 303d Tactical Missile Wing at RAF Molesworth in December 1986. In June 1987, Headquarters USAFE delegated tactical control of Third Air Force units to the Third Air Force commander.

On 15 April 1986, General Dynamics F-111 aircraft based at RAF Lakenheath and RAF Upper Heyford were launched against suspected terrorist targets in Libya, as part of Operation Eldorado Canyon.

With the signing of the Intermediate-Range Nuclear Forces Treaty in December 1987, GLCMs deployed to RAF Molesworth were removed to the U.S. and the 303rd TMW inactivated 30 January 1989. The last GLCMs at RAF Greenham Common were removed in March 1991, and the 501st TMW inactivated 4 June 1991.

When Iraq invaded Kuwait in August 1990, Third Air Force, like many other U.S. military units, received their trial by fire. However, for Third Air Force, the scenario was not similar to any which had been practiced in the past. Operations Desert Shield and Desert Storm were not classic east–west confrontations in Europe that Third Air Force had been trained for. Thousands of miles removed from the Kuwait theater of operations, Third Air Force played a major support role, deploying half its combat aircraft, several thousand vehicles, approximately 50,000 tons of munitions, and many more tons of supplies and material. Third Air Force also provided 2,250 hospital beds by activating three of its contingency hospitals and was ready in the event of a large number of casualties were received.

==== Structure in 1989 ====
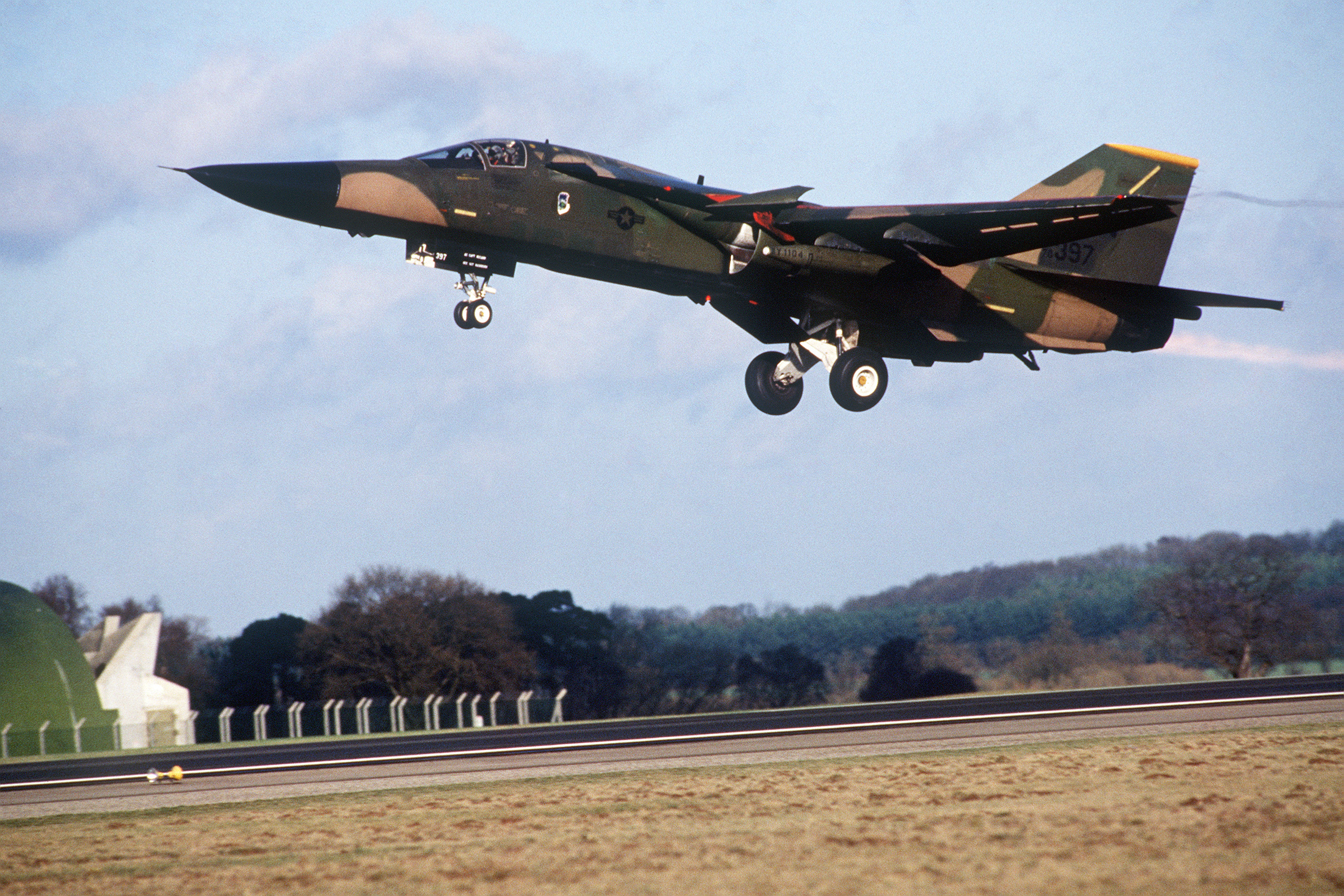
A F-111F aircraft from the 493rd Tactical Fighter Squadron takes off from Hahn Air Base for a mission over West Germany during Exercise REFORGER '86.

At the end of the Cold War Third Air Force consisted of the following units:

- Third Air Force, at RAF Mildenhall, United Kingdom
  - 10th Tactical Fighter Wing, at RAF Alconbury
    - 509th Tactical Fighter Squadron, with 24x A-10 Thunderbolt II
    - 511th Tactical Fighter Squadron, with 24x A-10 Thunderbolt II
  - 20th Tactical Fighter Wing, at RAF Upper Heyford
    - 55th Tactical Fighter Squadron, with 24x F-111E
    - 77th Tactical Fighter Squadron, with 24x F-111E
    - 79th Tactical Fighter Squadron, with 24x F-111E
    - 42d Electronic Combat Squadron, with 18x EF-111A Raven, detached from the 66th Electronic Combat Wing at Sembach Air Base, West Germany
  - 48th Tactical Fighter Wing, at RAF Lakenheath
    - 492d Tactical Fighter Squadron, with 24x F-111F
    - 493d Tactical Fighter Squadron, with 24x F-111F
    - 494th Tactical Fighter Squadron, with 24x F-111F
    - 495th Tactical Fighter Squadron, with 24x F-111F (Training Squadron)
  - 81st Tactical Fighter Wing, at RAF Bentwaters
    - 78th Tactical Fighter Squadron, with 24x A-10 Thunderbolt II (based at RAF Woodbridge)
    - 91st Tactical Fighter Squadron, with 24x A-10 Thunderbolt II (based at RAF Woodbridge)
    - 92d Tactical Fighter Squadron, with 24x A-10 Thunderbolt II
    - 510th Tactical Fighter Squadron, with 24x A-10 Thunderbolt II
    - 527th Tactical Fighter Training Squadron, with 16x F-16C Falcon fighters for aggressor training
  - 513th Airborne Command and Control Wing, at RAF Mildenhall
    - 10th Airborne Command and Control Squadron, with E-3 Sentry AWCS
  - 303d Tactical Missile Wing, at RAF Molesworth
    - 87th Tactical Missile Squadron, with 64x BGM-109G Ground Launched Cruise Missiles
  - 501st Tactical Missile Wing, at RAF Greenham Common
    - 11th Tactical Missile Squadron, with 96x BGM-109G Ground Launched Cruise Missiles
  - 7020th Air Base Group, at RAF Fairford, US Air Forces in Europe only B-52 Stratofortress heavy bomber base
  - 7274th Air Base Group, at RAF Chicksands
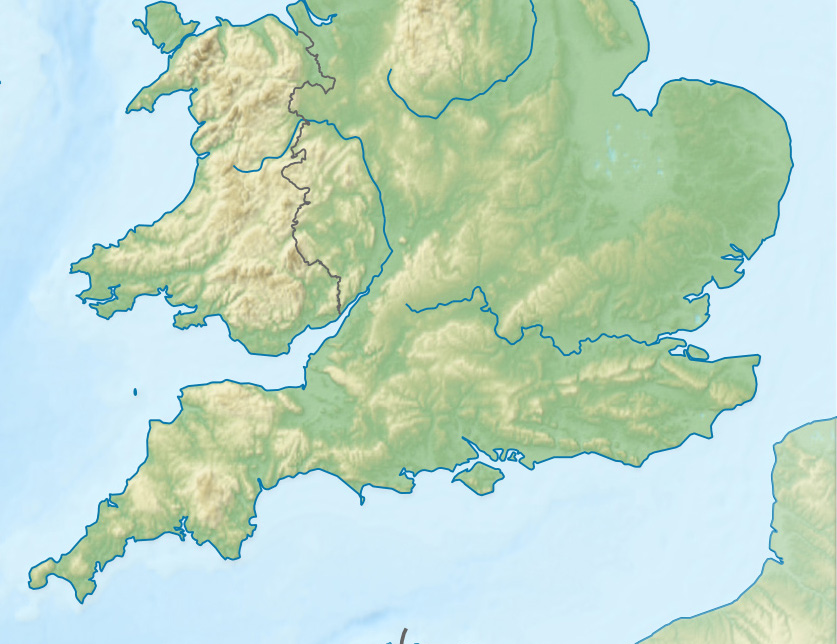
Third Air Force bases and stations in 1989

=== Post Cold War ===
The end of the Cold War with the former Soviet Union left in its wake many new military challenges, tensions and emerging conflicts. It also drew attention to the need for American military forces to operate in ways and locations outside the traditional NATO construct. The shift in east–west relations and the increasing focus toward Eastern Europe, the southern region and the Middle East led to a changing of the focus of Third Air Force as well. The U.S. Congress mandated large reductions in the American military budget and American military troop strength based in Europe. From a Cold War high of 450,000 in the late 1980s, American troop strength in Europe was reduced to 100,000 by the mid-1990s.

During the 1990s the USAF restructured itself to meet the emerging needs of the new world order. Several Third Air Force units returned to the U.S., and several more were inactivated. Third Air Force returned many of its bases to the British Ministry of Defence, and scaled down operations at other places.

In March 1996, Headquarters USAFE announced a major reorganization of its numbered air forces. The announcement included news of the inactivation of Seventeenth Air Force at Sembach Air Base Germany, transferring its responsibility for overseeing all U.S. Air Force units north of the Alps to Third Air Force. As a result of the changes, Third Air Force grew substantially, taking on two main operating bases, Ramstein Air Base and Spangdahlem Air Base, both in Germany, and five geographically separated units.

With this 1996 reorganization, Third Air Force was composed of more than 25,000 military people, and more than 35,000 family members. In terms of numbers of aircraft, Third Air Force had more than 200, including KC-135 and F-15 aircraft at bases in England, and A-10, F-16, C-9, C-20, C-21 and C-130E aircraft in Germany.

In addition to a larger area of responsibility, the command reorganization also brought about a subtle change in the mission of the Third Air Force headquarters element. Third Air Force was tasked to take a more active role in the leadership of operational contingencies, and provide trained staff to lead or augment joint and combined task force headquarters elements.

In 1998, Third Air Force provided the headquarters for JTF Eagle Vista, supporting the President's trip to Africa.

In 2005, USAFE once again realigned its numbered air forces. Sixteenth Air Force was aligned as the command's new Warfighting Headquarters. Third Air Force was inactivated on 1 November, ending the unit's prestigious 50-plus year legacy in the UK.

=== Reactivation 2006 and onwards ===
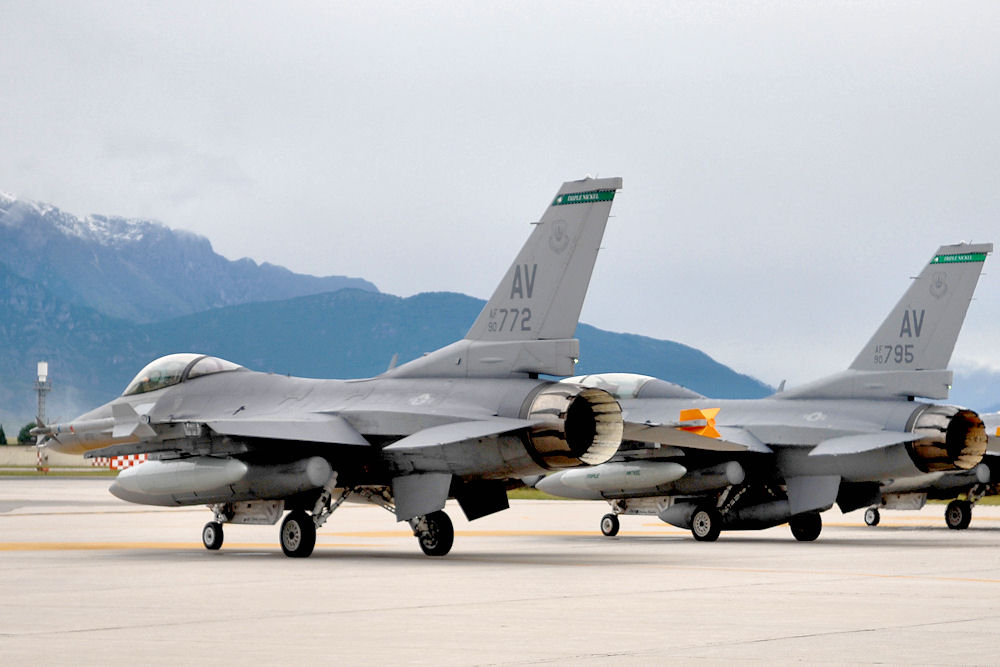
F-16s of the 31st Operations Group, 555th Fighter Squadron, Aviano Air Base, Italy

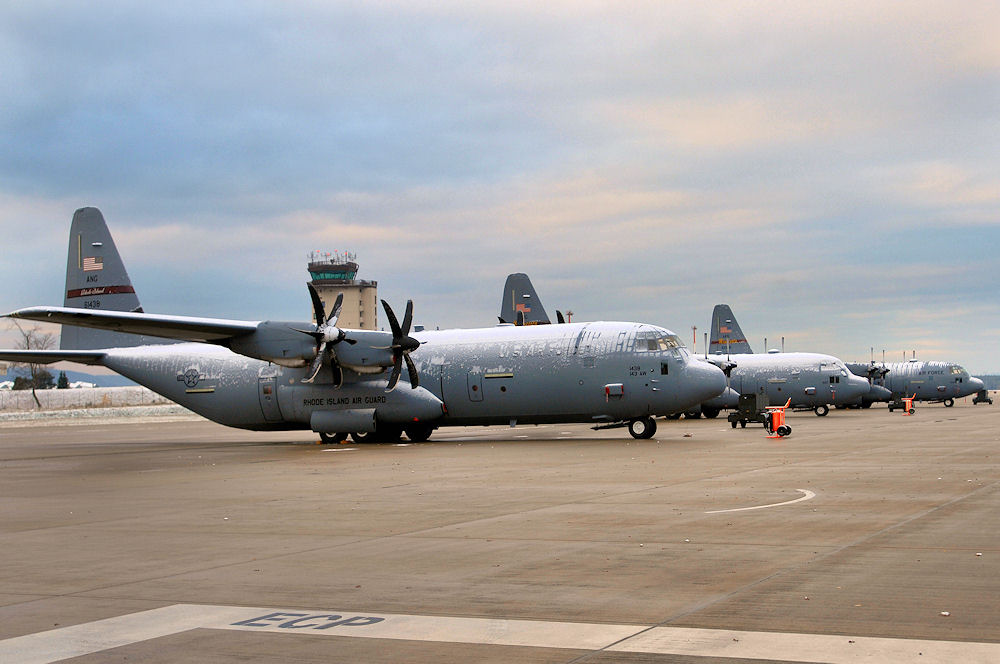
Transient C-130s, similar to those operated by the 86th OG, on the ramp at Ramstein AB, Germany

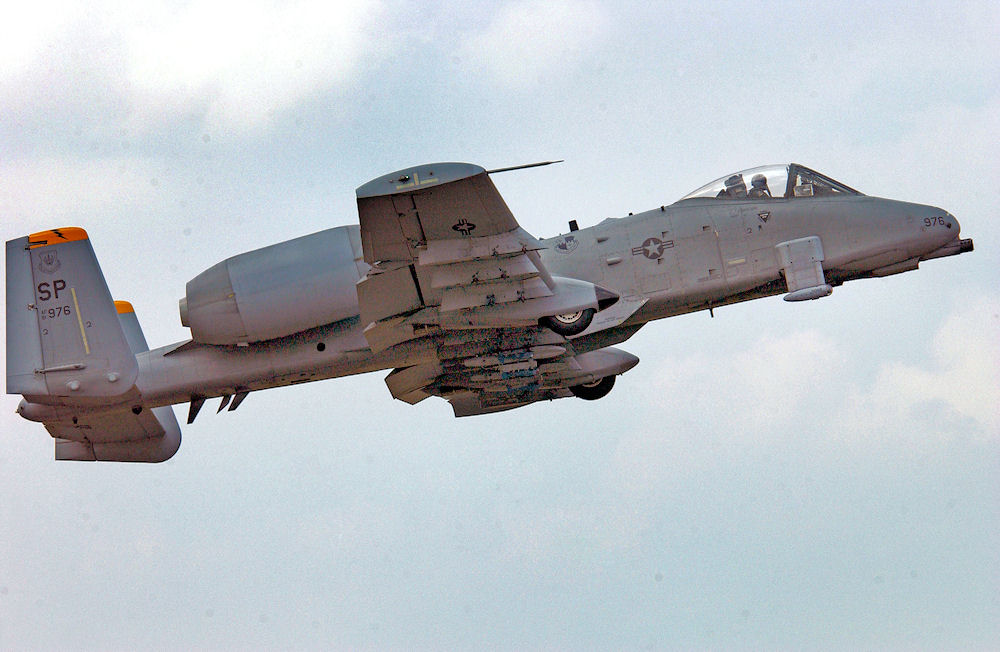
A-10A 81-0976 of the 52nd Operations Group, Spangdahlem AB, Germany

Just over a year after inactivation, Third Air Force was reactivated on 1 December 2006, at Ramstein AB, Germany, as USAFE's Air and Space Operations supporting U.S. European Command. Its new mission was to support the EUCOM commander's strategic objectives across the full range of military operations. When a joint task force is created in EUCOM, the Third Air Force commander is ready to assume the roles of Joint Forces Air Component Commander and Commander Air Force Forces, or lead the JTF as a Joint Force Commander.

Upon the inactivation of the Seventeenth Air Force in 2012, Third Air Force became the numbered air force supporting United States Air Forces Africa.

The Third Air Force also oversees host nation support agreements for all U.S. military forces based in the United Kingdom through the command's 3 AF-UK headquarters at RAF Mildenhall. Through the NATO Partnership for Peace program, the headquarters manages military contact and assistance programs for a number of countries in Eastern Europe. Third Air Force is also responsible for contingency planning and support of American security interests in Africa.

It is composed of more than 25,000 Airmen. Third Air Force is assigned more than 200 aircraft, and provides servicing to thousands of other transient aircraft that visit its bases each year.

== Lineage ==
- Established as Southeast Air District on 19 October 1940

Activated on 18 December 1940
Re-designated: 3 Air Force on 26 March 1941
Re-designated: Third Air Force on 18 September 1942
Inactivated on 1 November 1946

- Activated and organized on 1 May 1951

Inactivated on 1 November 2005

- Re-designated Third Air Force (Air Forces Europe) on 29 November 2006

Activated on 1 December 2006.

=== Assignments ===
- General Headquarters Air Force

(later, Air Force Combat Command), 18 December 1940

- Eastern Theater of Operations, 24 December 1941
- Air Force Combat Command

(later, United States Army Air Forces), 5 January 1942

- Continental Air Forces, 13 December 1944
- Tactical Air Command, 21 March 1946 – 1 November 1946
- United States Air Forces in Europe, 1 May 1951 – 1 November 2005; 1 December 2006 – present.
- United States Air Forces Africa, 20 April 2012 – present.

=== Stations ===
- MacDill Field, Florida, 18 December 1940
- Greenville AAB, 28 March 1946 – 1 November 1946
- Victoria Park Estate (later, U.S. Air Base, South Ruislip; South Ruislip Air Station), England, 1 May 1951
- RAF Mildenhall, England, 15 April 1972 – 1 November 2005
- Ramstein AB, Germany, 1 December 2006 – onwards

=== Components ===
Commands

- 1 Ground Air Support

(later, I Air Support; I Tactical Air Division; III Tactical Air Division; III Reconnaissance Command):12 August 1942 – 21 March 1946
II Air Support (later, II Tactical Air Division): 25 January 1943 – 25 October 1945.
3d Air Force Service (later, 3d Air Force Base): 1 October 1941 – 19 May 1942
3d Air Support: 1 September 1941 – 16 March 1942
3d Bomber (later, III Bomber Command): 5 September 1941 – 21 March 1946
3d Interceptor (later, III Interceptor; III Fighter Command): 17 June 1941 – 21 March 1946
III Ground Air Support (later, III Air Support; III Reconnaissance; III Tactical Air Command): 27 May 1942 – 24 October 1945.

Division

- 49th Air: 5 June 1952 – 1 July 1956.

Other components (incomplete list)

- Among groups assigned during the Second World War were the 2nd Air Commando; 3rd Air Commando; 3rd Bombardment Group; 12th Bombardment Group; 17th Bombardment Group; 21st Bombardment Group; 29th Bombardment; 30th Bombardment Group 38th Bombardment; 44th Bombardment Group; 46th Bombardment Group; 47th Bombardment Group; 85th Bombardment 88th Bombardment 90th Bombardment 91st Bombardment 92nd Bombardment 93rd Bombardment 94th Bombardment 95th Bombardment 97th Bombardment 98th Bombardment 99th Bombardment 100th Bombardment Group; 309th Bombardment Group, 1942–44; 309th Bombardment 310th Bombardment 312th Bombardment 319th Bombardment 320th Bombardment 321st Bombardment 322d Bombardment 323d Bombardment 335th Bombardment 336th Bombardment 340th Bombardment 344th Bombardment 345th Bombardment 386th Bombardment 387th Bombardment 391st Bombardment 394th Bombardment 396th Bombardment 397th Bombardment 409th Bombardment 410th Bombardment 411th Bombardment 416th Bombardment 417th Bombardment 418th Bombardment 451st Bombardment 454th Bombardment 463rd Bombardment 483rd Bombardment Group; 488th Bombardment; 20th Fighter 31st Fighter; 49th Fighter; 50th Fighter; 53rd Fighter; 54th Fighter; 56th Fighter; 59th Fighter Group; 79th Fighter Group February–June 1942; 80th Fighter Group; 81st Fighter 84th Fighter 85th Fighter 311th Fighter 332nd Fighter 337th Fighter 338th Fighter 339th Fighter 361st Fighter 369th Fighter 372nd Fighter 404th Fighter 405th Fighter 408th Fighter 414th Fighter 506th Fighter; and the 2d Reconnaissance Group; 9th Reconnaissance Group; 10th Reconnaissance Group; 26th Reconnaissance Group; 65th Reconnaissance Group; 67th Reconnaissance 68th Reconnaissance 69th Reconnaissance 70th Reconnaissance; 75th Reconnaissance; 77th Reconnaissance 423d Reconnaissance Group; 424th Reconnaissance Group; and the 426th Reconnaissance Group.
- Among wings and groups assigned after 1945 are the:
  - 10th Tactical Fighter Wing, later Air Base Wing
  - 20th Tactical Fighter Wing (later Fighter Wing)
  - 48th Tactical Fighter Wing (later Fighter Wing)
  - 81st Tactical Fighter Wing
  - 100th Air Refueling Wing, 1 February 1992-present
  - 513th Tactical Airlift Wing, later Airborne Warning and Control Wing, to 1992
  - 303rd and 501st Tactical Missile Wings
  - 603rd Regional Support Group (later Support Group), 1 July 1994-7 July 2010

== List of commanders ==
=== Third Air Force (Air Forces Europe) (2006–present) ===
No.	Commander		Term		
No.	Portrait	Name	Took office	Left office	Term length
1	Robert D. Bishop Jr.	Lieutenant General; Robert D. Bishop Jr.	1 December 2006	22 July 2008	1 year, 234 days
2	Philip M. Breedlove	Lieutenant General; Philip M. Breedlove	22 July 2008	24 August 2009	1 year, 33 days
3	Frank Gorenc	Lieutenant General; Frank Gorenc	24 August 2009	30 March 2012	2 years, 219 days
4	Craig A. Franklin	Lieutenant General; Craig A. Franklin	30 March 2012	31 January 2014 (Note: Resigned before end of term.)	1 year, 307 days
-	Carlton D. Everhart II	Major General; Carlton D. Everhart II; Acting	1 February 2014	11 June 2014	130 days
5	Darryl Roberson	Lieutenant General; Darryl Roberson	11 June 2014	2 July 2015	1 year, 21 days
6	Timothy Ray	Lieutenant General; Timothy Ray	2 July 2015	21 October 2016	1 year, 111 days
7	Richard M. Clark	Lieutenant General; Richard M. Clark	21 October 2016	7 September 2018	1 year, 321 days
8	John M. Wood	Major General; John M. Wood	7 September 2018	24 June 2020	1 year, 291 days
9	Randall Reed	Major General; Randall Reed	24 June 2020	18 May 2022	1 year, 328 days
-	John F. Gonzales	Colonel; John F. Gonzales; Acting	18 May 2022	22 June 2022	35 days
10	Derek C. France	Major General; Derek C. France	22 June 2022	3 April 2024	1 year, 286 days
11	Paul D. Moga	Major General; Paul D. Moga	3 April 2024	Incumbent	2 years, 160 days
