= 424th Reconnaissance Group =

- Active: 1943
- Country: United States
- Branch: United States Army Air Forces

The 424th Reconnaissance Group is an inactive United States Air Force unit. Its last assignment was with Third Air Force, based at DeRidder Army Airbase, Louisiana. It was inactivated on 15 August 1943.

The group was constituted on 30 March 1943 and activated on 1 April. The 35th, 36th, 37th and 38th Reconnaissance Squadrons were assigned. However, the unit was never fully organized. Disbanded on 15 August 1943.
