= 423d Reconnaissance Group =

- Active: 1943
- Country: United States
- Branch: United States Army Air Forces

The 423d Reconnaissance Group is an inactive United States Air Force unit. Its last assignment was with Third Air Force, based at DeRidder Army Airbase, Louisiana. It was inactivated on 15 August 1943.

The group was constituted on 30 March 1943 and activated on 1 April. The 29th, 32d, 33d and 34th Reconnaissance Squadrons were assigned. Its mission was to be a Replacement Training Unit for reconnaissance pilots, but it was changed to instructor training for III Fighter Command. It was never fully organized, and no aircraft were assigned. It disbanded on 15 August 1943.
