= 9th Photographic Reconnaissance Group =

9th Reconnaissance Group
- Active: 1943–1944
- Country: United States
- Branch: United States Army Air Forces

The 9th Reconnaissance Group was a group of the United States Army Air Forces. Its last assignment was with Third Air Force, based at Will Rogers Field, Oklahoma. It was inactivated on 6 May 1944.

The unit trained crews and units for photographic reconnaissance and combat mapping. It had no assigned operational squadrons, conducted training with attached squadrons from other units. Aircraft used were F-3 (A-20), F-4 (P-38), F-5 (P-38) F-7 (B-24), F-9 (B-17). Inactivated on 6 May 1944.
