= Wiley Post Airport =

- IATA: PWA; ICAO: KPWA; FAA LID: PWA

Summary
- Airport type: Public
- Owner: City of Oklahoma City
- Operator: Oklahoma City Airport Trust
- Serves: Oklahoma City, Oklahoma, United States
- Elevation AMSL: 1,299 ft (396 m)
- Coordinates: 35°32′03″N 097°38′49″W
- Website: WileyPostAirport.com

Map
- Location of airport in Oklahoma / United States PWA (the United States)

Runways
Direction	Length		Surface
Direction	ft	m	Surface
13/31	4,214	1,284	Concrete
17L/35R	7,199	2,194	Concrete
17R/35L	5,002	1,524	Asphalt/concrete

Statistics (2021)
- Aircraft operations (year ending July 7, 2021): 55,293
- Based aircraft: 334
- Sources: airport website and FAA

Wiley Post Airport (IATA: PWA, ICAO: KPWA, FAA LID: PWA) is a city-owned public-use airport located seven nautical miles (13 km) northwest of the central business district of Oklahoma City, Oklahoma, United States. The facility covers 1,143 acres (463 ha) and has three runways.

It was named after Wiley Post, the first pilot to fly solo around the world, who died in the same 1935 crash as the namesake of the city's other major airport, Will Rogers World Airport.

It is the FAA-designated reliever airport for Will Rogers World Airport and serves business and corporate air travelers and functions as a center for general aviation. In addition, the northwest Oklahoma City airport provides an environment for aviation-related industry.

In the year ending July 7, 2021, Wiley Post logged 55,293 flight operations. This figure accounts for only those operations logged by the air traffic control tower, which is open daily from 7 A.M. until 10 P.M.

The airport provides a base for over 300 aircraft in its leased hangars. These range from single and twin engine planes to turboprop and jet aircraft.

== History ==
The original Wiley Post Airport existed approximately 5 miles to the northeast of the current location, at the northwest corner of May Avenue and Britton Road. The May Avenue location was originally built as Curtiss-Wright Field in 1928. In 1941 Curtiss-Wright Field was renamed to become Wiley Post Airport. The airport operated until it was closed in 1955, with the land being repurposed for residential development.

The current location on North Rockwell Avenue was originally Tulakes Airport, which was constructed in 1942 as a wartime auxiliary supporting overflow military traffic for the main Will Rogers Field. After the war, traffic at Will Rogers Field transitioned to civilian purposes using larger and faster aircraft. Then the auxiliary transitioned to serve smaller general aviation as Tulakes Airport. In 1961 Tulakes Airport was renamed to become today's Wiley Post Airport.

== Accidents and incidents ==
- On March 4, 2008, a Cessna Citation I operated by Interstate Helicopters impacted terrain 4.1 miles SW of Wiley Post Airport after takeoff because of wing structure damage caused by impact with one or more large birds (American white pelicans). All 5 occupants (2 crew, 3 passengers) were killed.

== See also ==
- List of airports in Oklahoma
