= 2d Photographic Reconnaissance Group =

2d Reconnaissance Group
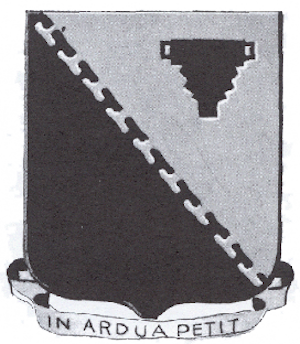
- Emblem of the 2d Reconnaissance Group
- Active: 1942–1944
- Country: United States
- Branch: United States Army Air Forces

The 2d Reconnaissance Group is an inactive United States Air Force unit. It was last assigned to the Third Air Force, being stationed at Will Rogers Field, Oklahoma. It was inactivated on 1 May 1944.

The unit was active during World War II as a reconnaissance and mapping training unit, initially being assigned to Second Air Force, then to Third Air Force in October 1943. The group also trained crews and occasionally provided personnel to help man new groups and squadrons. Aircraft included B-17s, B-24s, B-25s, L-4s, L-5s, P-38s, and A-20s.

== History ==
=== Lineage ===
- Constituted as 2d Photographic Group on 1 May 1942

Activated on 7 May 1942
Redesignated: 2d Photographic Reconnaissance and Mapping Group in May 1943
Redesignated: 2d Photographic Reconnaissance Group in August 1943
Disbanded on 1 May 1944

=== Assignments ===
- II Air Support Command, 7 May 1942
- III Air Support Command, 7 October 1943 – 1 May 1944

=== Components ===
- 6th Photographic Squadron: 1942
- 7th Photographic Reconnaissance Squadron: 1942–1944
- 10th Photographic Reconnaissance Squadron: 1942–1944
- 11th (formerly 5th) Combat Mapping Squadron: 1942–1944
- 29th Photographic Reconnaissance Squadron: 1943–1944.

=== Stations ===
- Bradley Field, Connecticut, 7 May 1942
- Colorado Springs Army Air Base, Colorado, c. 13 May 1942
- Will Rogers Field, Oklahoma, c. 7 October 1943 – 1 May 1944.
