= OKC Will Rogers International Airport =

Airport in Oklahoma City, United States

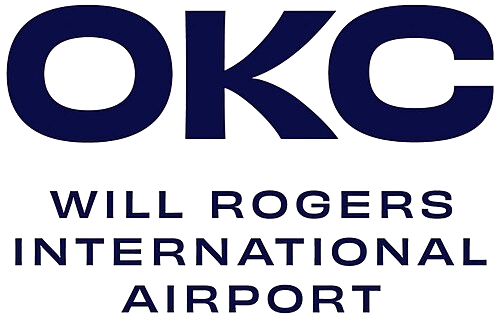

- Will Rogers in September 2023
- IATA: OKC; ICAO: KOKC; FAA LID: OKC

Summary
- Airport type: Public
- Owner: Oklahoma City Department of Airports
- Operator: Oklahoma City Airport Trust
- Serves: Oklahoma City metropolitan area
- Location: Oklahoma City, Oklahoma, U.S.
- Elevation AMSL: 1,296 ft (395 m)
- Coordinates: 35°23′35″N 097°36′03″W
- Website: flyokc.com

Maps
- FAA airport diagram
- Interactive map of OKC Will Rogers International Airport

Runways
Direction	Length		Surface
Direction	ft	m	Surface
13/31	7,800	2,377	Concrete
17L/35R	9,802	2,988	Concrete
17R/35L	9,800	2,987	Concrete
18/36	3,078	938	Asphalt

Statistics (2025)
- Total passengers: 4,605,097 ▲.05%
- Aircraft operations: 98,508
- Total cargo (lbs.): 72,420,418
- Source: Will Rogers World Airport

OKC Will Rogers International Airport (IATA: OKC, ICAO: KOKC, FAA LID: OKC), formerly known as Will Rogers World Airport until 2024, is an airport located in Oklahoma City, Oklahoma, United States, approximately 6 miles (10 km) southwest of Downtown Oklahoma City. Its facility is used jointly for civil and military, covering 8,081 acres (32.70 km^{2}) of land. Although the official IATA and ICAO airport codes for OKC Will Rogers International Airport are OKC and KOKC, it is common practice to refer to it as "WRWA" or "Will Rogers".

The airport is named for comedian and legendary cowboy Will Rogers, an Oklahoma native who died in an airplane crash near Utqiagvik, Alaska, in 1935. The city's other major airport, Wiley Post Airport, along with the Wiley Post–Will Rogers Memorial Airport in Utqiagvik, are named for Wiley Post, who also died in the same crash. The airport was the only airport to use "World" in its designation. International flights did not begin until November 8, 2025, with a new customs facility opening earlier in the year in preparation.

OKC Will Rogers International Airport is the busiest commercial airport in the state of Oklahoma. In 2019, the airport handled nearly 4.42 million passengers, marking the busiest year on record three years in a row. Southwest Airlines carries the most passengers at OKC Will Rogers International Airport, with a market share of nearly 48% as of April 2022.

== History ==
The airport first opened in 1911 as Oklahoma City Municipal Airfield. It was renamed in Rogers' honor in 1941.

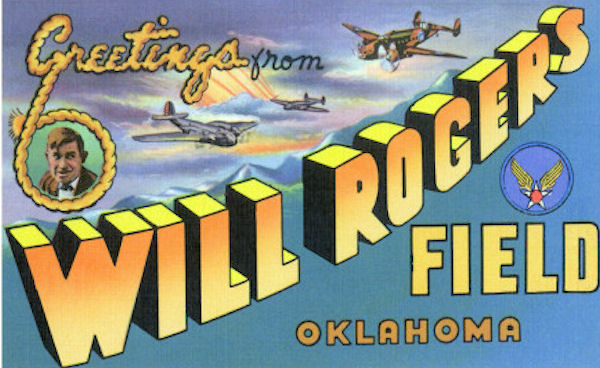
World War II postcard from Will Rogers Army Airfield

During World War II, Will Rogers Field was a major training facility for the United States Army Air Forces; many fighter and bomber units were activated and received initial training there.

Army Air Forces groups known to have been stationed at Will Rogers Field include:

- 44th Bombardment Group (Heavy) July 1942 - August 28, 1942
- 46th Bombardment Group (Light) November 1942 - October 1943
- 47th Bombardment Group (Light) February 16, 1942 - July 18, 1942
- 48th Bombardment Group (Light) May 22, 1941 - February 7, 1942
- 86th Bombardment Group (Light) February 10, 1942 - June 20, 1942
- 311th Bombardment Group (Light) March 2, 1942 - July 4, 1942
- 312th Bombardment Group (Light) June 1942 - August 1942
- 409th Bombardment Group (Light) June 1, 1943 - October 1943
- 410th Bombardment Group (Light) July 1, 1943 - October 1943
- 411th Bombardment Group (Light) August 1, 1943 - August 15, 1943
- 416th Bombardment Group (Light) February 5, 1943 - June 4, 1943
- 417th Bombardment Group (Light) March 28, 1943 - August 4, 1943
- 9th Photographic Group (Reconnaissance) October 1, 1943 - May 6, 1944
- 2d Reconnaissance Group October 7, 1943 - May 1, 1944
- 70th Tactical Reconnaissance Group November 14, 1943 – November 30, 1943

After completion of their initial training, these units were reassigned to other airfields for secondary training before deployment overseas.

=== Postwar ===
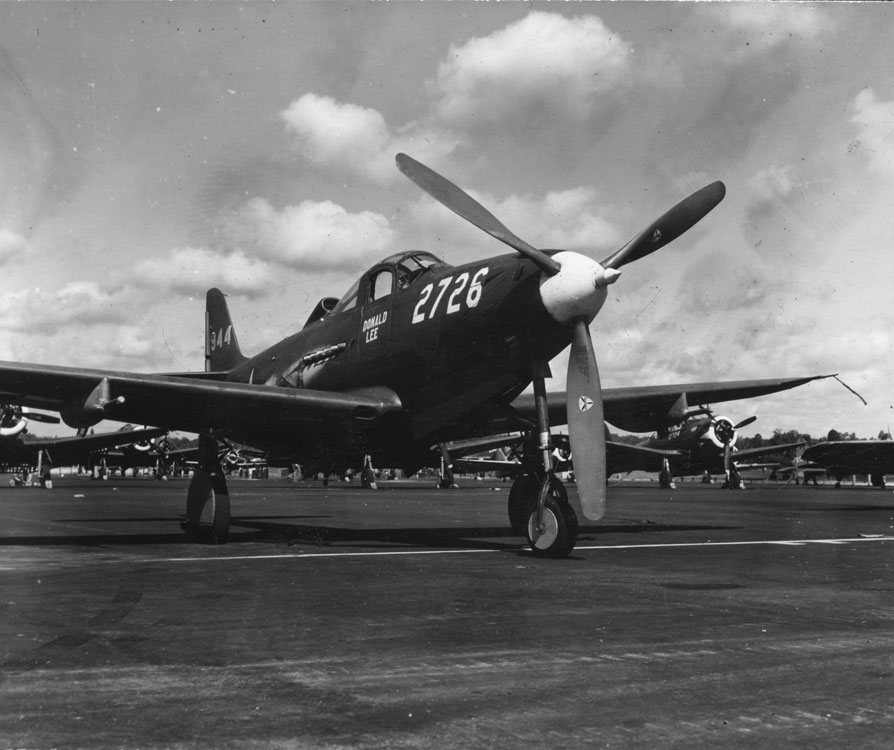
Bell P-39 Airacobra at Will Rogers Field, 1944

The December 1951 C&GS chart showed four runways: the 5497-ft runway 3, 3801-ft runway 8, 5652-ft runway 12 and 5100-ft runway 17.

The April 1957 OAG showed 21 daily nonstop departures on Braniff International Airways, 15 on American Airlines, five on Central Airlines, four on Continental Airlines and three on TWA. A TWA Constellation aircraft flew nonstop from Oklahoma City to Los Angeles, but eastward nonstops didn't reach beyond Wichita, Kansas, Tulsa or Dallas, Texas. Oklahoma City began nonstop flights to Chicago starting in 1966.

=== 2000–present ===
Great Plains Airlines, a regional airline based in Tulsa, Oklahoma, made Will Rogers World Airport a hub in 2001 with nonstop flights to Tulsa, Albuquerque, New Mexico, and Colorado Springs, Colorado and direct or connecting flights to Nashville, Tennessee, St. Louis, Chicago, and Washington. The airline had hoped to reach additional East- and West-Coast markets but declared bankruptcy and ceased operations on January 23, 2004.

On May 31, 2013, an EF-1 tornado hit Will Rogers Airport. The 1.4-mile wide tornado traveled 10.4 miles, including across the northern side of the airport. The path of the tornado passed over the facilities of MetroTech, the FAA, the Oklahoma National Guard, AAR, the Four Points Hotel, and the passenger terminal and hangars on the north and east side of the airport. Minor damage was reported at AAR and other buildings in this path. The Parking Spot location north of the airport on Meridian Avenue was also hit by the tornado. The company decided in August 2013 not to re-open the facility and exit the OKC market.

The airport once partnered with Tinker AFB in presenting Aerospace America airshow.

On August 27, 2024, the city council of Oklahoma City approved a name change for the airport proposed by the OKC Airport Trust, officially changing the airport's name from "Will Rogers World Airport" to "OKC Will Rogers International Airport". The Trust attributed the name and logo change to a desire to market the airport to a wider audience. It was announced in 2024 that the airport plans to expand routes to Mexico and the Caribbean in 2025.

On March 26, 2025, the airport's first nonstop international destination was announced. American Airlines began nonstop service to Cancún, Mexico on November 8, 2025.

== Terminal ==
In the late 1990s, the Oklahoma City Airport Trust deemed the 1967-built terminal building unsuitable. Following the adoption of a three-phase master plan, preparations for renovating the airport were launched in 2001. The old twin concourses (visible in the 1995 photograph) were demolished to make way for a larger terminal with integrated concourses, high ceilings, and modern facilities.

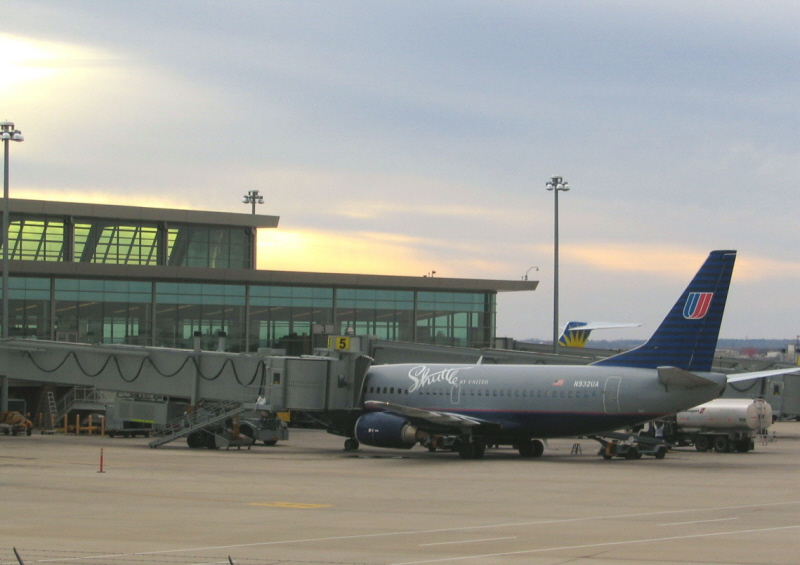
WRWA East Concourse, with a Shuttle by United Boeing 737-500 aircraft

A $110 million multi-phase expansion and renovation project, designed by Atkins Benham Inc. and Gensler and built by Oscar J. Boldt Construction Company, began in 2001. Phase I involved erection of construction walkways from the five-story parking garage to the terminal building, demolishing the terminal's existing elevator core, construction of new elevator and escalator cores on the tunnel level and on level one, building temporary entrance and exit ramps for vehicles approaching and leaving the terminal, reconstruction of the roofs of the lower level and level one, finishing the elevator and escalator cores to level two, building new permanent entry and exit ramps for vehicles, and construction of a new transportation plaza and driving lanes. Phase II included a new concourse constructed to the west of the central terminal area, which was renovated to match the interior and exterior designs of the new concourse. The 1960s-built concourses were then demolished after the new concourse opened in 2005. The entire phase was completed in November 2006. Phase III project calls for the construction of a new concourse to the east, with at least eight more gates as well as expanded retail, restaurant, and baggage areas.

Will Rogers International Airport has a single three-level terminal with 17 departure gates along the West Concourse (Gates 1–12), Central Concourse (Gates 14–24) East Concourse (Gates 26-32). Gate 32 is soon to be used for international flights. Gates on the south side use even numbers while those on the north use odd. Due to the terminal's layout, certain odd numbers are omitted in the succession of Gates 1 through 32. Arriving passengers can access baggage claim in the downstairs level where there are 9 baggage belts. Level 3 contains offices for airline and airport staff.

The architecture of the current terminal uses native stone along with loft-ceilings, plate glass and brushed metal. Compared to the original terminal design of the old Concourses A and B, today's terminal provides a more open feel similar to that found in larger hub airports.

The new East Concourse features 4 gates which hold exclusively Delta flights. This new concourse was completed in September 2021. It features a modern design and an observation deck for plane spotting.

=== Terminal expansion ===
In 2008, Will Rogers World Airport officials approved a contract with Frankfurt Short Bruza Associates to begin planning for expansion. Officials later agreed to postpone the expansion plan due to the industry-wide decline in passenger traffic caused by the Great Recession.

During 2012, the Phase III expansion plan was updated to include a new Central Concourse reconfiguration plan. In 2014, the Airport Trust selected Option 2a, which includes only the central terminal improvements. The $3.6 million project will create a new central checkpoint in the center of the check-in hall. Two new greeter lobbies will be created where existing check points exist. The expansion will slightly reduce the space utilized by Sonic in the food court. The restrooms in the area will also be relocated to the nearby Osage room. The Southwest ticket counters will be relocated further east.

In 2015, the airport trust agreed to proceed with the full construction of the East Concourse due to increased congestion in the existing West and Central concourses and passenger demand. When completed, the existing terminal building would to the east and include a new passenger concourse initially with four gates, which would increase the number of boarding gates to 21. The new facility will have customs and immigration on the lower level accessed by the two easternmost gates and would serve international arrivals. The expansion will incorporate a single TSA screening zone in the center of the existing terminal, the food court will be removed and two reconstructed and arriving passengers would exit at the current TSA zones, which will be dramatically downsized into modern "meeter-greeter areas". The East expansion will include onsite USAA military welcoming facilities, expanded concessions and office space, and an updated terminal lobby.

The new concourse expansion project will also include an innovative view system composed of an elevated platform and lounge that will allow visitors to walk above the newly expanded East Concourse and view down onto the secure gate areas and out to the airside. Visitors would enter the elevated walkway at the terminal lobby non-secured side. This design is intended to provide visitors the experience of airports of old; where one could walk all the way to the gate – albeit today completely separated from the secured concourse space. The expansion broke ground in March 2019 and opened in September 2021. Construction began on the customs and immigration facility in 2024, and is scheduled to be completed in 2025.

If necessary, a final expansion of the existing master plan could be accomplished with construction of the Central Concourse, increasing gate capacity by an additional 9 gates. This would give the terminal a final configuration with three concourses, East, West, and Central, and would provide the airport with 30+ gates.

== Airlines and destinations ==
=== Passenger ===
Airlines	Destinations	Refs
Alaska Airlines	Seattle/Tacoma	
Allegiant Air	Gulf Shores; Seasonal: Destin/Fort Walton Beach, Las Vegas, Orlando/Sanford	
American Airlines	Charlotte, Dallas/Fort Worth; Seasonal: Cancún, Washington–National	
American Eagle	Charlotte, Chicago–O'Hare, Dallas/Fort Worth, Los Angeles, Miami, New York–LaGuardia, Phoenix–Sky Harbor, Washington–National	
Delta Air Lines	Atlanta	
Delta Connection	Minneapolis/St. Paul, New York–LaGuardia, Salt Lake City	
Frontier Airlines	Denver, Las Vegas	
Southwest Airlines	Austin, Chicago–Midway, Dallas–Love, Denver, Houston–Hobby, Las Vegas, Nashville, Orlando, Phoenix–Sky Harbor, Washington–National; Seasonal: Baltimore, Los Angeles	
United Airlines	Denver; Seasonal: Chicago–O'Hare, Houston–Intercontinental	
United Express	Chicago–O'Hare, Denver, Houston–Intercontinental, San Francisco (starts March 28, 2027)	

=== Destinations map ===
Continental United States Destinations
Destinations from OKC Will Rogers International Airport
Red = Year-round destination
Green = Seasonal destination
Blue = Future destination
Pink = Destination being terminated
Mexico Destinations
Mexico destinations from OKC Will Rogers International Airport
Green = Seasonal destination

== Statistics ==
=== Top destinations ===
Busiest domestic routes from OKC (August 2025 – July 2026)
Rank	City	Passengers	Airline
1	Dallas/Fort Worth, Texas	347,394	American
2	Denver, Colorado	308,093	Frontier, Southwest, United
3	(Georgia (U.S. state)) Atlanta, Georgia	193,162	Delta, Frontier
4	Houston–Intercontinental, Texas	159,020	United
5	Phoenix–Sky Harbor, Arizona	149,674	American, Southwest
6	Chicago–O'Hare, Illinois	145,688	American, United
7	Las Vegas, Nevada	143,120	Allegiant, Frontier, Southwest
8	Houston–Hobby, Texas	128,950	Southwest
9	Charlotte, North Carolina	87,300	American
10	St. Louis, Missouri	68,061	Southwest

Busiest international routes from OKC (August 2025 – July 2026)
Rank	City	Passengers	Airline
1	Cancún, Mexico	4,066	American

Largest airlines at OKC (August 2025 – July 2026)
Rank	Airline	Passengers	Share
1	Southwest Airlines	1,643,667	35.5%
2	American Airlines	1,360,446	29.4%
3	United Airlines	711,868	15.4%
4	Delta Air Lines	572,994	12.4%
5	Frontier Airlines	164,562	3.6%
	Other airlines	176,800	3.8%

=== Annual traffic ===
Annual passenger traffic at OKC (enplaned + deplaned)
Year	Passengers	Year	Passengers	Year	Passengers
1999	3,730,265	2009	3,584,415	2019	4,404,814
2000	3,685,715	2010	3,666,712	2020	1,945,181
2001	3,454,098	2011	3,741,908	2021	3,356,425
2002	3,203,221	2012	3,830,864	2022	3,996,671
2003	3,478,735	2013	3,819,616	2023	4,422,307
2004	3,591,577	2014	3,910,776	2024	4,626,739
2005	3,704,686	2015	3,681,673	2025	4,593,342
2006	3,750,056	2016	3,709,158	2026	
2007	3,952,080	2017	3,913,262	2027	
2008	3,986,865	2018	4,318,411	2028	

== Ground transportation ==
=== Rental car ===
The airport opened a new Consolidated Rental Car Facility in early 2016, moving all rental services away from the Terminal to a grand facility nearby. Advantage, Alamo, Avis, Budget, Dollar, Enterprise, Hertz, National, and Thrifty rental companies offer service at Will Rogers World Airport. Shuttle buses connect passengers from the arrivals plaza just outside the terminal.

=== Parking ===
The airport began a $3.8 million maintenance project in September 2011 to rehabilitate and repair two of its three parking garages. The project will make improvements to garages A and B, two of the six parking options at the airport. Garage A is the two-story garage that provides hourly parking for the airport's short-term visitors on the upper level, and "ready-return" spaces for the rental car agencies on the lower level. Parking Garage B, adjacent to A, is the older of the two five-level parking structures that provide covered parking for air travelers. Garage C, the new parking garage that opened in 2009, will not be impacted. Nearing middle age (Garage A is 44 years old and Garage B is 31 years old), the structures will undergo several different types of refurbishments that will extend the long-term use of the facilities. The work will include:

- Repair of concrete walls and pillars, specifically where there are cracks or spalling (chips of concrete that have broken off) and other deterioration
- Replacement or repair of exterior stairs
- Replacement and upgrade of all lighting circuits
- Replacement and upgrade of all lighting fixtures
- The top levels of each garage will receive new expansion joints, membrane coating, waterproofing and protectant to prevent leaking.

The project will be divided into 12 sequences, allowing the airport to keep as much of the garage open as possible. Most of the sequences will only require closing about 300 spaces at a time, leaving approximately 2,500 of the 2,800 total spaces in the two garages available for parking. The project work will start in the five-level Garage B on levels one and two. The entire project is anticipated to take 18 months. The most challenging portion of the project will be when the work commences on the two-story parking garage. During this sequencing, hourly parking and rental car companies will be moved to temporary locations in Garage B and C.

The airport operates three surface parking lots on the grounds of WRWA.

- Lot No. 1 is a long-term remote shuttle lot located on Amelia Earhart Drive.
- Lot No. 2 is a long-term shuttle lot located directly adjacent to the parking garages on the north side.
- Lot No. 3 is a long-term canopy shuttle lot that provides shelter from sun and hail with protective canopies. It is located to the west of the parking garages on 67th Street near the control tower.

The airport provides a short-term parking area in the second (top) level of Garage A. The parking is free for the first hour and then $2 per hour after that. There are also two cell phone waiting areas just across the street from the shuttle parking lot No. 2, near Lot No. 3, and by the flag plaza north of the long-term shuttle Lot No. 2.

== Government and military operations ==
=== Will Rogers Air National Guard Base ===
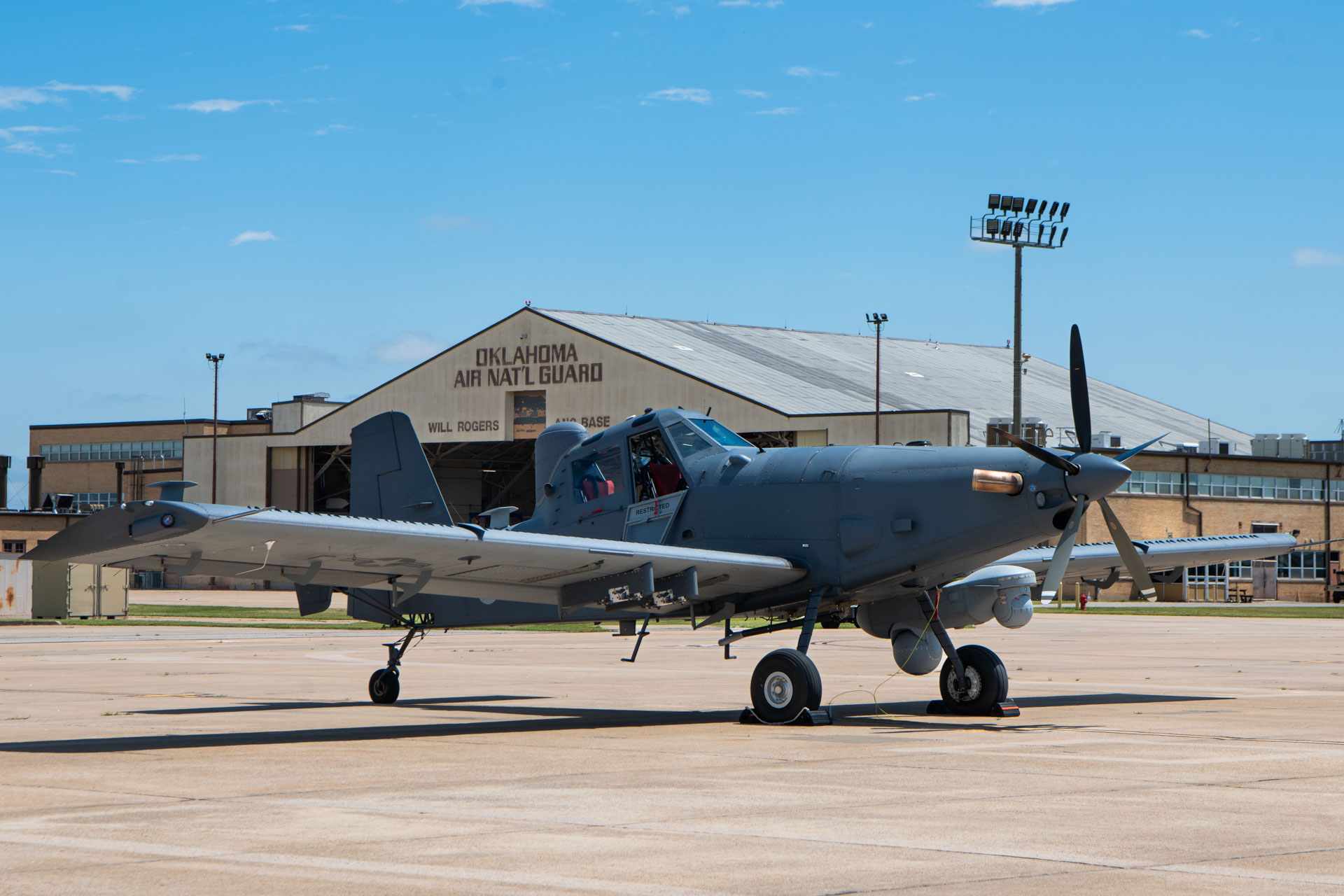
OA-1K Skyraider II at Will Rogers Air National Guard Base

Until 2008, the Oklahoma Air National Guard's 137th Airlift Wing (137 AW) and its Lockheed C-130 Hercules aircraft were located at the airport's Will Rogers Air National Guard Base. As part of the 2005 round of Base Realignment and Closure Commission (BRAC) recommendations, the majority of the maintenance unit (excluding the munitions flight) was relocated to nearby Tinker Air Force Base, where the wing transitioned to the Boeing KC-135 Stratotanker aircraft and became the 137th Air Refueling Wing (137 ARW), an "Associate" unit of the 507th Air Refueling Wing (507 ARW). The unit then shared KC-135 aircraft with the Air Force Reserve Command's 507th Air Refueling Wing in a joint operations and maintenance program. On 30 Jun 2015, the 137 ARW / 507 ARW partnership at Tinker AFB officially ended. The 137th was transferred to Air Force Special Operations Command and redesignated as the 137th Special Operations Wing (137 SOW), flying the Beechcraft MC-12 Liberty, marking a return of ANG flight operations to Will Rogers.

The MC-12 Liberty Formal Training Unit (FTU) will be replaced by the L3Harris OA-1K Skyraider II FTU. The FTU was established in 2024 as the 17th Special Operations Squadron.

Will Rogers Air National Guard Base also continues to be the home of the unit's Expeditionary Support Group headquarters, operations and support, as well as the Oklahoma ANG's 146th Air Support Operations Squadron. The Oklahoma Army National Guard also carries out helicopter maintenance at the airport.

=== Other facilities ===
The Federal Aviation Administration Mike Monroney Aeronautical Center is located on the west side of the airport. The Center headquarter's the Civil Aerospace Medical Institute, FAA Academy and Logistics Center.

The U.S. Department of Justice has major Justice Prisoner Air Transportation System (JPATS) facilities at Will Rogers World Airport. The Federal Transfer Center and its principal air hub is built on the west side of the airport grounds, off of Taxiway G.

The U.S. Customs and Border Protection operate their CBP Air and Marine Operations National Air Training Center facility on airport grounds. They operate a hangar on the north side of the airport, adjacent to the JPATS Hangar.

The Oklahoma City Composite Squadron of Civil Air Patrol meets on Tuesday evenings at 6:30 pm on the grounds of the Oklahoma Air National Guard base on the west side of the field.

The City of Oklahoma City Department of Airports manages Will Rogers World Airport and the other city-owned airports: Wiley Post Airport and Clarence E. Page Municipal Airport. The Airport Trust is led by Director Mark Kranenburg.

== Businesses and other onsite institutions ==
=== Corporate, air taxi ===
Will Rogers World Airport has a separate terminal facility used by air taxi and corporate service, although most of these flights use the Wiley Post Airport, Oklahoma City's FAA-designated reliever facility.

=== Maintenance, repair, operations and fixed-base operations ===
AAR Oklahoma has a fixed-base operation location, as well as a major maintenance, repair, and overhaul facility and regional headquarters at Will Rogers World Airport, in addition to other aircraft maintenance and aircraft on ground organizations.

ARINC has major facilities on the airport premises, including plans to double the size of their current facility.

Atlantic Aviation has a fixed-base operation located on the east side of the airport, off of Taxiway H. This is Atlantic's first Greenfield project.

=== Other facilities ===
Southwest Airlines has one of its largest customer service and support centers on the northern grounds of Will Rogers World Airport.

Will Rogers World Airport is home to Metro Technology Center's Aviation Career Campus. The aviation center offers training to prepare aircraft maintenance technicians with classrooms, practical labs, and separate airframe and powerplant hangars are available for academic and hands-on training. The Aviation Maintenance Technician program is an 18-month course that is certified and approved by the Federal Aviation Administration.

The facility is on the west side of the airport, north of the FAA center. One notable sight on the MetroTech campus includes a donated AirTran Airways DC-9-30 in the post AirTran Airways / ValuJet merger colors.

Will Rogers World Airport permanently hosts the Ninety Nines Museum of Women Pilots. The facility is located on more than 5,000 square feet (460 m^{2}), occupying the entire second floor of the International Headquarters building. It features a repository for a unique collection of the papers, personal items and other historic artifacts of some of the most significant achievements and adventures of the international community of women pilots. Its library and exhibit areas will provide new insights into the role women pilots played in the development of aviation.

=== Lariat Landing ===
Lariat Landing is a new development on the east side of the airport grounds that encompasses 1,000 acres (400 ha). The development is meant to generate increased non-airline revenue for the airport while still growing air service. The development will be mixed use with nearly half of it, west of Portland Avenue, designated to direct aviation support (with runway access) with an additional portion dedicated to aviation support companies. The remaining portion east of Portland Avenue will be zoned for retail, industrial, and commercial office space.

The direct aviation parcels of Lariat Landing will be marketed towards aircraft maintenance, aircraft manufacturing, commercial air cargo, and corporate aviation companies. Atlantic Aviation and ARINC are two tenants already located in the new development area. The aviation support district will be targeting companies that provides aviation related goods and services. The target companies include freight forwarders, logistics, cargo, warehousing, distribution operations, and manufacturing companies.

Located between Interstate 44 and Portland Avenue, the office park will have a retail village as the gateway to its campus. It will target offices, hotels/motels, retail, warehouse, distribution, and logistic companies.

Property will only be leased due to FAA requirements and will have a maximum term of 40 years. The realignment of Portland Avenue is currently in process while the new 48-inch (1.2 m) waterline installation has already been completed.

== Accidents and incidents ==
On March 26, 1939, Braniff International Airways Trip 1, a Douglas DC-2, registration NC13727, crashed while attempting to return to the airport. The aircraft had just departed when a cylinder on the left engine tore loose from its mounting and caused a tear in the engine cowling. Subsequent drag from the torn cowling resulted in a stall on the wing, and the plane cartwheeled on to the airport grounds, just yards from the safety of the runway. The captain cut the fuel switches just before impact, but misted fuel from the tanks spread over the hot engines, causing a fire. The captain, first officer, and three passengers survived. The flight's hostess and seven passengers, however, died in the disaster.

A Rockwell Sabreliner, registration N5565 crashed on January 15, 1974, after descending below minimums on an ILS approach in low clouds and fog. Both occupants were killed.

On December 21, 2012, a U.S. Customs and Border Patrol Cessna Citation crashed during landing at Will Rogers Airport. Both occupants survived; one had minor injuries.

On November 15, 2016, a Southwest Airlines employee, Michael Winchester was shot and killed in a parking garage; a 45-year-old suspect, Lloyd Dean Buie, was subsequently found dead of an apparently self-inflicted wound. Winchester was the father of Kansas City Chiefs long snapper James Winchester and himself a former punter and member of the Oklahoma Sooners' 1985 national championship college team.

On June 19, 2024, Southwest Airlines Flight 4069 nosed down to an altitude of 525 feet above Yukon, Oklahoma, 9 miles from Will Rogers Int'l Airport, and received an automated altitude warning from air traffic control, but recovered to land safely at OKC without incident.
