= 426th Reconnaissance Group =

Inactive United States Air Force unit

426th Reconnaissance Group (later 426th Tactical Intelligence Group)
- Active: 1943
- Country: United States
- Branch: United States Air Force
- Role: Military intelligence

The 426th Tactical Intelligence Group is an inactive United States Air Force unit. It was active as the 426th Reconnaissance Group in 1943, but was disbanded before becoming fully organized. It was reconstituted as a military intelligence unit in 1985, but has not been active since.

== History ==
The 426th Reconnaissance Group was activated at Gainesville Army Air Field, Texas on 1 July 1943. It was apparently never fully organized, although its 45th Reconnaissance Squadron and 47th Liaison Squadron apparently began to receive aircraft. These two squadrons were transferred out of the group on 11 August 1943, and the group and its remaining components were disbanded four days later.

The group was reconstituted in 1983 as the 426th Tactical Intelligence Group, but has not been active since then.

== Lineage ==
- Constituted as the 426th Reconnaissance Group on 25 June 1943

Activated on 1 July 1943
Disbanded on 15 August 1943
Reconstituted on 15 July 1983 as the 426th Tactical Intelligence Group

=== Assignments ===
- III Air Support Command, 1 July 1943 – 15 August 1943

=== Components ===
- 44th Reconnaissance Squadron (Fighter), 1 July 1943 – 15 August 1943
- 45th Reconnaissance Squadron (Fighter), 1 July 1943 – 11 August 1943
- 46th Reconnaissance Squadron (Bomber), 1 July 1943 – 15 August 1943
- 47th Liaison Squadron, 1 July 1943 – 11 August 1943

=== Stations ===
- Gainesville Army Air Field, Texas, 1 July 1943 – 15 August 1943

=== Aircraft ===
- Stinson L-1 Vigilant
- Taylorcraft L-2 Grasshopper
- Aeronca L-3 Grasshopper
- Piper L-4
- Stinson L-5 Sentinel
- North American O-47
- Bell P-39 Airacobra
