= List of airports in New Mexico =

This article lists all airports in New Mexico (a U.S. state), grouped by type and sorted by location. It contains all public-use and military airports in the state. Some private-use and former airports may be included where notable, such as airports that were previously public-use, those with commercial enplanements recorded by the FAA or airports assigned an IATA airport code.

== Airports ==
This list contains the following information:

- **City served** – The city generally associated with the airport, as per the airport's master record with the Federal Aviation Administration. This is not always the actual location since some airports are located in smaller towns outside of the city they serve. It is not meant to be a complete list of cities served, which can be found in or added to each airport's Wikipedia article.
- **FAA** – The location identifier assigned by the Federal Aviation Administration (FAA).
- **IATA** – The airport code assigned by the International Air Transport Association (IATA). Those that do not match the FAA code are shown in bold.
- **ICAO** – The location indicator assigned by the International Civil Aviation Organization (ICAO).
- **Airport name** – The official airport name. Those shown in **bold** indicate the airport has scheduled passenger service on commercial airlines.
- **Role** – One of four FAA airport categories, as per the 2021–2025 National Plan of Integrated Airport Systems (NPIAS) report released September 2020:
  - P-s: Commercial service – primary are publicly owned airports that receive scheduled passenger service and have more than 10,000 passenger boardings (enplanements) each year. Each primary airport is sub-classified by the FAA as one of the following four "hub" types (s):
    - L: Large hub that accounts for at least 1% of total U.S. passenger enplanements.
    - M: Medium hub that accounts for between 0.25% and 1% of total U.S. passenger enplanements.
    - S: Small hub that accounts for between 0.05% and 0.25% of total U.S. passenger enplanements.
    - N: Nonhub that accounts for less than 0.05% of total U.S. passenger enplanements, but more than 10,000 annual enplanements.
  - CS: Commercial service – nonprimary are publicly owned airports that receive scheduled passenger service and have at least 2,500 passenger boardings each year.
  - R: Reliever airports are designated by the FAA to relieve congestion at a large commercial service airport and to provide more general aviation access to the overall community.
  - GA: General aviation airports are the largest single group of airports in the U.S. airport system. They are public-use airports that do not have scheduled service or have scheduled service with less than 2,500 passenger boardings each year.
- **Enplanements** – The number of enplanements (commercial passenger boardings) that occurred at the airport in calendar year 2024, as per FAA records released October 2025.

City served	FAA	IATA	ICAO	Airport name	Role	Enplanements (2024)
				**Commercial service – primary airports**		
Albuquerque	ABQ	ABQ	KABQ	**Albuquerque International Sunport**	P-M	2,690,218
Hobbs	HOB	HOB	KHOB	**Lea County Regional Airport**	P-N	26,212
Roswell	ROW	ROW	KROW	**Roswell Air Center**	P-N	48,740
Santa Fe	SAF	SAF	KSAF	**Santa Fe Municipal Airport**	P-N	180,248
				**Commercial service – nonprimary airports**		
Carlsbad	CNM	CNM	KCNM	**Cavern City Air Terminal**	CS	4,076
Clovis	CVN	CVN	KCVN	**Clovis Regional Airport**	CS	12,033
Silver City	SVC	SVC	KSVC	**Grant County Airport**	CS	6,915
				**Reliever airports**		
Albuquerque	AEG		KAEG	Double Eagle II Airport	R	0
				**General aviation airports**		
Alamogordo	ALM	ALM	KALM	Alamogordo-White Sands Regional Airport	GA	0
Angel Fire	AXX	AXX	KAXX	**Angel Fire Airport**	GA	52
Artesia	ATS	ATS	KATS	Artesia Municipal Airport	GA	16
Aztec	N19			Aztec Municipal Airport	GA	0
Belen	BRG		KBRG	Belen Regional Airport	GA	0
Carrizozo	F37			Carrizozo Municipal Airport	GA	0
Clayton	CAO	CAO	KCAO	Clayton Municipal Airpark	GA	0
Conchas Dam	E89			Conchas Lake Airport	GA	0
Crownpoint	0E8			Crownpoint Airport	GA	0
Deming	DMN	DMN	KDMN	Deming Municipal Airport	GA	5
Dulce	24N			Jicarilla Apache Nation Airport	GA	0
Española	E14	ESO		Ohkay Owingeh Airport (was San Juan Pueblo Airport)	GA	0
Farmington	FMN	FMN	KFMN	**Four Corners Regional Airport**	GA	11
Fort Sumner	FSU	FSU	KFSU	Fort Sumner Municipal Airport	GA	0
Gallup	GUP	GUP	KGUP	**Gallup Municipal Airport**	GA	2,619
Glenwood	E94			Glenwood Airport	GA	0
Grants	GNT	GNT	KGNT	Grants-Milan Municipal Airport	GA	0
Hatch	E05			Hatch Municipal Airport	GA	0
Jal	E26			Lea County-Jal Airport	GA	0
Las Cruces	LRU	LRU	KLRU	**Las Cruces International Airport**	GA	2,104
Las Vegas	LVS	LVS	KLVS	Las Vegas Municipal Airport	GA	2
Lordsburg	LSB	LSB	KLSB	Lordsburg Municipal Airport	GA	0
Los Alamos	LAM	LAM	KLAM	Los Alamos County Airport	GA	0
Lovington	E06			Lea County-Zip Franklin Memorial Airport	GA	0
Magdalena	N29			Magdalena Airport	GA	0
Moriarty	0E0			Moriarty Municipal Airport	GA	0
Navajo Dam	1V0			Navajo Lake Airport	GA	0
Portales	PRZ		KPRZ	Portales Municipal Airport	GA	0
Questa	N24			Questa Municipal Nr 2 Airport	GA	0
Raton	RTN	RTN	KRTN	Raton Municipal Airport (Crews Field)	GA	0
Reserve	T16			Reserve Airport	GA	0
Ruidoso	SRR	RUI	KSRR	Sierra Blanca Regional Airport	GA	0
Santa Rosa	SXU		KSXU	Santa Rosa Route 66 Airport	GA	0
Santa Teresa	DNA		KDNA	Doña Ana County International Jetport	GA	14
Shiprock	5V5			Shiprock Airstrip	GA	0
Socorro	ONM	ONM	KONM	Socorro Municipal Airport	GA	0
Springer	S42			Springer Municipal Airport	GA	0
Taos	SKX	TSM	KSKX	**Taos Regional Airport**	GA	5,118
Truth or Consequences	TCS	TCS	KTCS	Truth or Consequences Municipal Airport	GA	0
Tucumcari	TCC	TCC	KTCC	Tucumcari Municipal Airport	GA	0
Vaughn	N17			Vaughn Municipal Airport	GA	0
Zuni Pueblo	XNI		KXNI	Andrew Othole Memorial Airport	GA	0
				**Other public-use airports** (not listed in NPIAS)		
Apache Creek	13Q			Jewett Mesa Airport		
Conchas Dam	E61			Conchas Lake Seaplane Base		
Edgewood	1N1			Sandia Airpark Estates East Airport		
Estancia	E92			Estancia Municipal Airport		
Lindrith	E32			Lindrith Airpark		
Los Lunas	E98			Mid Valley Airpark		
Mountainair	M10			Mountainair Municipal Airport		
Silver City	94E			Whiskey Creek Airport		2
Tatum	18T			Tatum Airport (was FAA: E07)		
				**Military airports**		
Alamogordo	HMN	HMN	KHMN	Holloman Air Force Base		0
Clovis	CVS	CVS	KCVS	Cannon Air Force Base		642
Socorro	95E			Stallion Army Airfield		
White Sands	WSD	WSD	KWSD	Condron Army Airfield		
White Sands				White Sands Space Harbor		
				**Known private-use airports**		
Columbus	0NM0	CUS		Columbus Municipal Airport		
Hobbs	NM83	HBB		Industrial Airpark		
Truth or Consequences	90NM			Spaceport America		
				**Former airports**		
Alamo	~~3N9~~			Alamo Navajo Airport (closed 2008?) Archived October 11, 2008, at the Wayback Machine		
Albuquerque				Oxnard Field (1928–1948)		
Albuquerque	~~4AC~~			Coronado Airport (1961-2001)		
Albuquerque				West Mesa Airport (1929–1967)		
Albuquerque				Graham-Bell Airport aka East Mesa Airpark (1945–1952)	~~GA~~	
Eunice	~~E04~~			Eunice Airport (closed 2007?) Archived June 28, 2006, at the Wayback Machine	~~GA~~	
Zuni Pueblo	~~ZUN~~		~~KZUN~~	Black Rock Airport (closed 2017)	~~GA~~	

== See also ==
- Essential Air Service
- New Mexico World War II Army Airfields
- Wikipedia:WikiProject Aviation/Airline destination lists: North America#New Mexico
