= Army Air Forces Bombardier School =

Former US military training school

Bombardier School
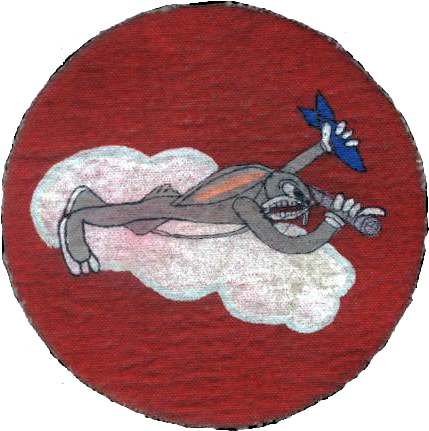
- 1943 AAF Bombardier School patch for Carlsbad Army Airfield with Bugs Bunny

Site information
- Type: United States Army Air Forces facility

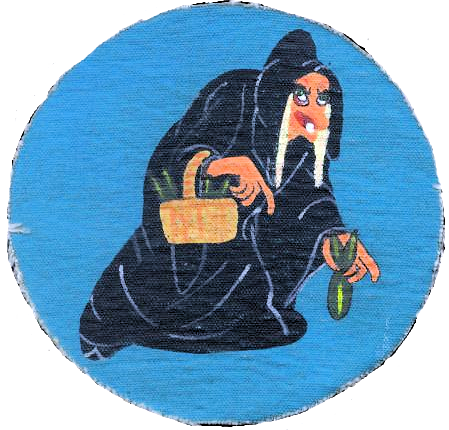
AAF Bombardier School patch for Deming Army Airfield with The Witch form of the Evil Queen from Disney's Snow White. The school was moved from Hobbs Army Airfield, the 1st class graduated March 6, 1943; & Deming had 7 "Bombardier Training Squadrons": 966th, 971st, 972nd, & 974-7th.

A Bombardier School was a United States Army Air Forces facility that used bombing ranges for training aircrew. After ground simulator training with the Norden bombsight, the 12- to 18-week course recorded each student's scores for approximately 160 practice bomb drops of "Bomb Dummy Units" (BDU), both in daytime and at night. The elimination rate was 12%, and graduates transferred to a Second or Third Air Force training unit to join a crew being trained for overseas duty. The bombardier trainer used was the Beech AT-11 Kansan. With the Bradley Plan increase in Eighth Air Force aircrews needed for the Combined Bomber Offensive, the 17 Army Air Forces Bombardier Schools graduated 47,236.

== History ==
A July 1941 attempt at establishing a bombardier school at Lowry Field, Colorado (3 instructor classes with the last graduating 14 March 1941), was replaced by schools at Barksdale Field, Louisiana (moved to Albuquerque) and Ellington Field, Texas (changed to a navigator school.) In June 1942, several classes of cadets were sent for bombardier training at Davis-Monthan Field, Arizona.

Bombardier schools of the Gulf Coast Air Corps Training Center and the West Coast Air Corps Training Center included the GCACTC's Big Spring Army Air Force Bombardier School. Its "first class of cadets (118 men) arrived Sept. 16, 1942". The first bombardier training class (42-17) at San Angelo Army Airfield began in September 1942, and San Angelo's 34th Flying Training Wing (Bombardier and Specialized Twin- and Four-Engine) activated on 8 January 1943, as one of two dedicated bombardier training wings. The other was WCACTC's 38th Flying Training Wing at Williams Army Airfield, Arizona—later moved to Kirtland Field, New Mexico).

The GCACTC's Advanced Twin Engine and Bombardier Training Center at Midland Army Airfield was redesignated an Army Air Forces Bombardier School on 26 September 1942 (Colonel Ryan was the Director of Training Jan 1942 – Aug 1943). The Midland school operated 23 bombing ranges in West Texas, and the Central Bombardier Instructor School was moved to Midland in August 1943 from Carlsbad Army Airfield. The WCACTC's Kirtland Field bombardier school that operated ranges west of Albuquerque was depicted in the 1943 Bombardier film. The first graduates with dual ratings as Navigator/Bombardier were in April 1944.

In addition to visual bomb scoring and sound ranging for determining scores for bombardiers, Radar Bomb Scoring (RBS) began during World War II. On 6 June 1945, "the 206th Army Air Force Base Unit (RBS) (206th AAFBU), was activated at Colorado Springs, Colorado for [RBS with] operational control of the two SCR-584 radar detachments located at Kansas City and Fort Worth" Army Airfield. RBS detachments in the Army Air Force were later "established at Denver, Chicago, Omaha, Albuquerque").

External image
- Map of schools w/ hyperlinks
