= 38th Flying Training Wing (U.S. Army Air Forces) =

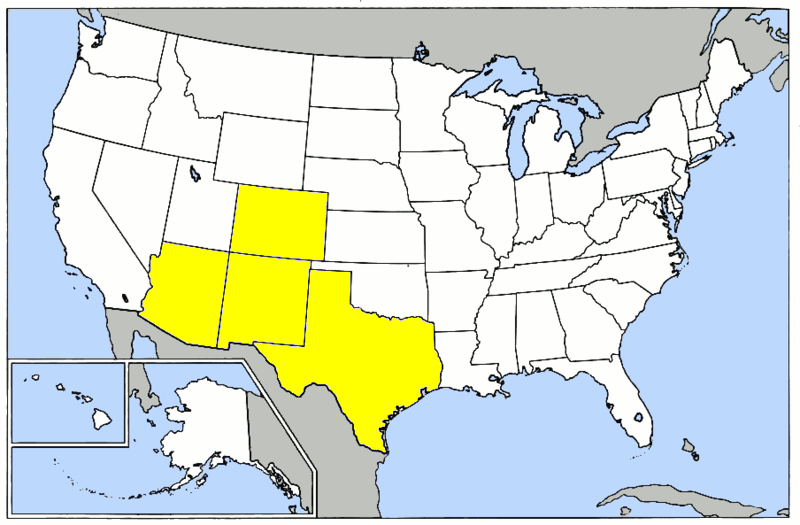
- Locations of airfields controlled by the 38th Flying Training Wing
- Active: 1942–1946
- Country: United States
- Branch: United States Army Air Forces
- Type: Command and Control
- Role: Training
- Part of: Army Air Forces Training Command
- Engagements: World War II: World War II American Theater

The 38th Flying Training Wing is an inactive United States Air Force unit. It was last assigned to the Western Flying Training Command, and was disbanded on 16 June 1946 at Williams Field, Arizona.

There is no lineage between the United States Air Force 38th Combat Support Wing, established on 10 August 1948 at Itami Airfield, Japan, and this organization.

== History ==
The wing was a World War II Command and Control organization which supported Training Command Flight Schools in the southwestern United States, primarily in New Mexico. The wing controlled fight schools primarily instructing in advanced (Phase III) two and four engine training, along with bombardier training and before June 1944, glider training. Graduates of the advanced schools were commissioned as Second Lieutenants, received their "wings" and were reassigned to Operational or Replacement Training Units operated by one of the four numbered air fores in the zone of interior.

As training requirements changed during the war, schools were activated and inactivated or transferred to meet those requirements.

=== Lineage ===
- Established as 38th Flying Training Wing on 17 December 1942

Activated on 8 January 1943
Disbanded 16 June 1946.

=== Assignments ===
- AAF West Coast (later, AAF Western Flying) Training Center, 8 January 1943 – 16 June 1946

=== Training aircraft ===
The schools of the wing used a wide variety of planes to support its numerous training needs:

- The Cessna AT-17 Bobcat was the standard two-engine advanced trainer, along with the Cessna UC-78 variant of the AT-17

The North American B-25 Mitchell medium bomber, as well as the AT-24 Mitchell were used for two-engine bomber training and transition. Some Martin B-26 Marauders were also used for training.
Four-Engine training was done with Boeing B-17 and Consolidated B-24 bombers

- Glider/Liaison aircraft training used L-2, L-3, L-4 aircraft, as well as the TG-5, TG-6 and CG-4 gliders

=== Assigned Schools ===
Artesia Municipal Airport, Artesia, New Mexico
AAF Contract Glider School
3d AAF Flying Training Detachment
Opened: October 1942, Closed: January 1943 (L-2, L-3, L-4, TG-5, TG-6)
Big Spring Flying Service (Glider pilot training); Glider school closed January 1943. Remained as auxiliary for Roswell AAF (Auxiliary Field #8); USAAF use ended in October 1945

Carlsbad Army Airfield, Carlsbad, New Mexico
AAF Advanced Flying School (Bombardment)
319th Bombardier Training Group
Opened: September 1942, Closed: October 1945 (AT-11)
Aircraft carried fuselage code "C"; Had one auxiliary airfield, 25+ practice bombing ranges

Deming Army Airfield, Deming, New Mexico
AAF Advanced Flying School (Bombardment)
Opened: November 1942, Closed: December 1944 (AT-11)
Aircraft carried fuselage code "D"; Bombardier school closed November 1944; Transferred to Second Air Force 16th Bombardment Training Wing December 1944; became B-29 Superfortress training field using modified B-25s; closed December 1945; Had three auxiliary airfields, 19 practice bombing ranges

Fort Sumner Army Airfield, Ft. Sumner, New Mexico
AAF Advanced Flying School, Two-Engine
AAF Gunnery School
Opened: January 1942, Closed: July 1944 (AT-17, UC-78)
Two-engine school closed July 1944; transferred to II Fighter Command and became fighter pilot RTU operating P-40s and P-47s; Had at least seven auxiliary airfields; Closed November 1945
Aircraft carried fuselage code of "I";

Fort Sumner AAF Aux No. 7, Tucumcari, New Mexico
AAF Contract Glider School
2d AAF Flying Training Detachment
Opened: October 1942, Closed: April 1944 (L-2, L-3, L-4, TG-5, TG-6, CG-4A)
Cutter-Carr Flying Service (Glider pilot training); Glider school closed April 1944. Remained as auxiliary for Fort Sumner AAF (Auxiliary Field #7); USAAF use ended in October 1945

Hobbs Army Airfield, Hobbs, New Mexico
AAF Advanced Flying School, Two/Four-Engine, and transition school
Opened: September 1942, Closed: February 1945 (AT-11, B-17D/F/G)
Aircraft carried fuselage code "H"; Had at least seven auxiliary airfields

Kirtland Army Airfield, Kirtland, New Mexico
AAF Advanced Flying School (Bombardment)
Opened: May 1941, Closed: April 1944 (AT-11, B-24E)
Aircraft carried fuselage code "Q"; Transferred to Second Air Force, Marcy 1945 for B-29 Superfortress training; Had at least six auxiliary airfields; remained open after World War II ended, now Kirtland Air Force Base.

La Junta Army Airfield, La Junta, Colorado
AAF Advanced Flying School, Two-Engine
Opened: July 1942, Closed: May 1945 (AT-24, UC-78, B-25)
Had at least four auxiliary airfields, training switched to B-25s in September 1944; school transferred to II Fighter Command, June 1945, became single-engine fighter RTU (P-40, P-47); closed December 1945
Aircraft carried fuselage code of "J";

Marfa Army Airfield, Marfa, Texas
AAF Advanced Flying School, Two-Engine, also Two-Engine Transition
Opened: November 1942, Closed: May 1945 (AT-17, UC-78, B-25, B-26)
Had at least seven auxiliary airfields
Aircraft carried fuselage code of "M";

Pecos Army Airfield, Pecos, Texas
AAF Advanced Flying School, Two-Engine
Opened: June 1942, Closed: May 1945 (AT-17, UC-78)
Aircraft carried fuselage code "P"

Roswell Army Air Field, Roswell, New Mexico
AAF Advanced Flying School, Two/Four-Engine, and transition school
AAF Flying School (Bombardment)
Opened: May 1941, Closed: February 1945 (AT-11, B-25, B-17)
Aircraft carried fuselage code "W"; Transferred to Second Air Force, February 1945 for B-29 Superfortress training; Had at least nine auxiliary airfields remained open after World War II ended, became Walker Air Force Base; closed 1967.

Young Municipal Field, Fort Morgan, Colorado
AAF Contract Glider School
1st AAF Flying Training Detachment
Opened: May 1942, Closed: November 1943 (L-2, L-3, L-4, TG-5, TG-6)
Plains Airways, Inc. (Glider pilot training)

=== Stations ===
- Roswell Army Airfield, New Mexico, 8 January 1943
- Kirtland Field, New Mexico, 10 September 1943
- Williams Field, Arizona, 26 February 1945 – 16 June 1946.

== See also ==
- Army Air Forces Training Command
- Other Western Flying Training Command Flight Training Wings:

35th Flying Training Wing (World War II) Basic/Advanced Flight Training (California)
36th Flying Training Wing (World War II) Primary Flight Training
37th Flying Training Wing (World War II) Basic/Advanced Flight Training (Arizona)
81st Flying Training Wing (World War II) Classification/Preflight Unit
