= Conchas Lake =

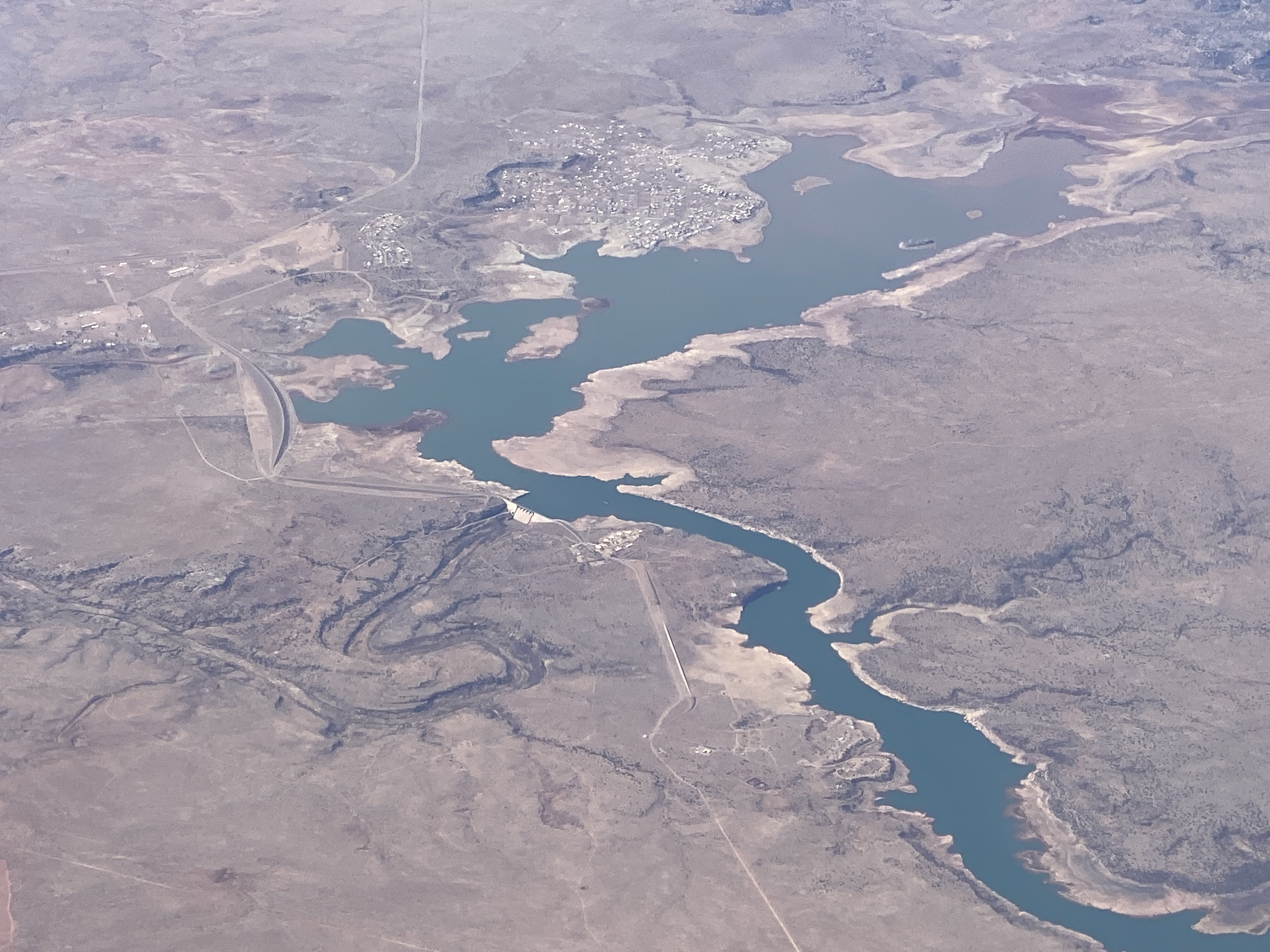
- Aerial view of Conchas Lake

- Location within New Mexico Location within the United States
- Location: San Miguel County, New Mexico, United States
- Coordinates: 35.380°N 104.231°W
- Type: reservoir
- Catchment area: 7,409 mi^{2} (19,190 km^{2})
- Basin countries: United States
- Max. length: 25 mi (40 km)
- Surface area: 9,600 acres (3,900 ha)
- Water volume: 709,119 acre⋅ft (874,685 dam^{3})
- Surface elevation: 4,200 ft (1,280 m)
- Website: Official website

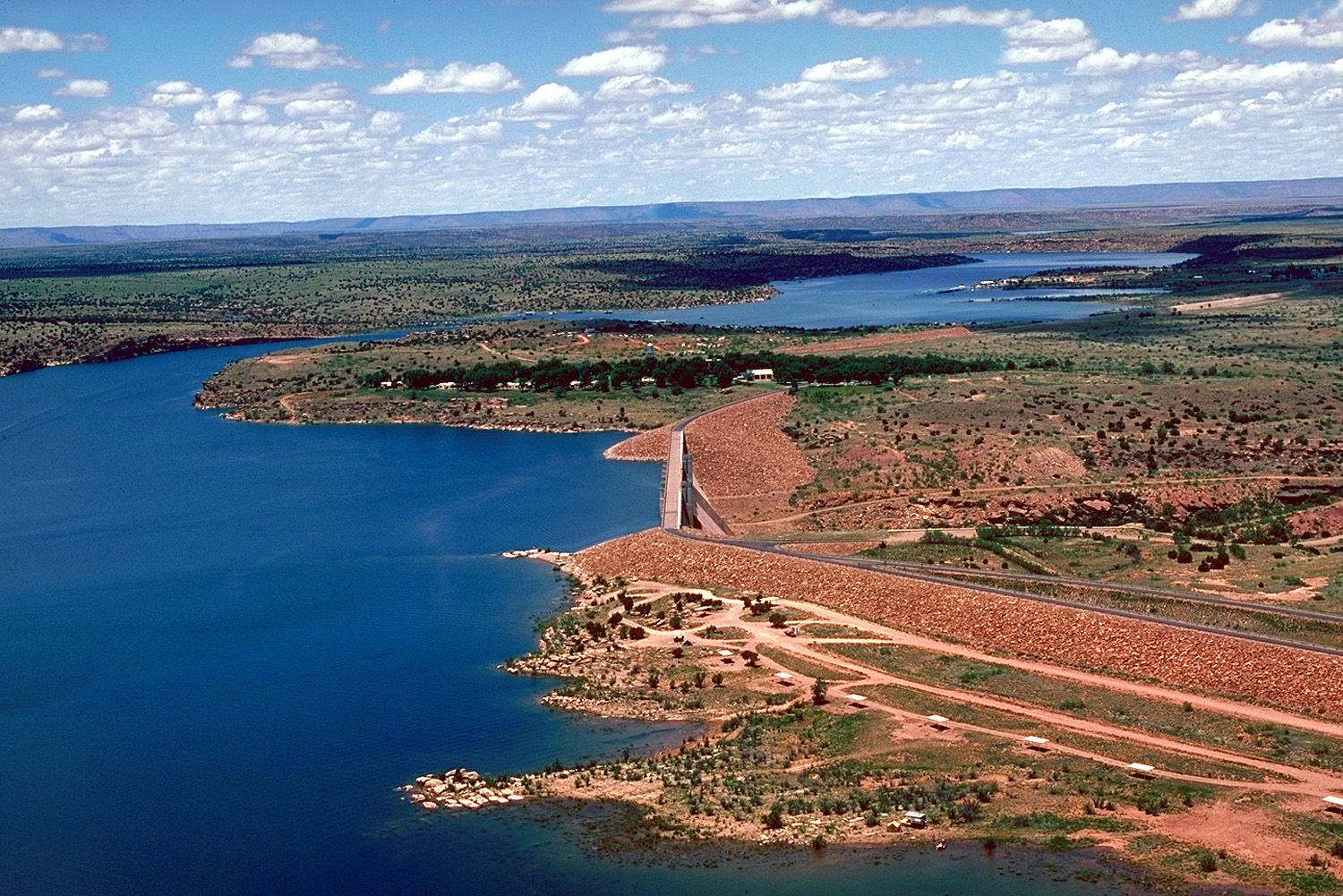
Conchas Dam and Lake

Conchas Lake is a 25-mile (40 km) long reservoir in northeastern New Mexico, behind Conchas Dam on the Canadian River. The lake has an elevation of 4,200 feet (1,300 meters) and a surface area of 9,600 acres.

Conchas Dam was completed in 1939 by the United States Army Corps of Engineers.

Adjacent to the lake is Conchas Lake State Park, which is divided into two separate areas, north and south. The state park has nine public boat ramps: five in the north area and four in the south area. The lake contains walleye, largemouth bass, white bass, shad, flathead catfish, channel catfish, bluegill, and crappie. The south area is located between the town of Conchas and Hooverville. Visitors can access the lake via New Mexico State Road 104, at mile marker 75, 29 miles (47 km) northwest of Tucumcari and 75 miles (121 km) southeast of Las Vegas.

The Conchas Lake Airport is located on NM 104 east of the lake, and Conchas Lake Seaplane Base is located 2 nautical miles (3.7 km) north of Conchas Dam.

== See also ==
- San Miguel County, New Mexico
