= Pecos Municipal Airport =

Airport in Reeves County, Texas

Pecos Municipal Airport Pecos Army Airfield
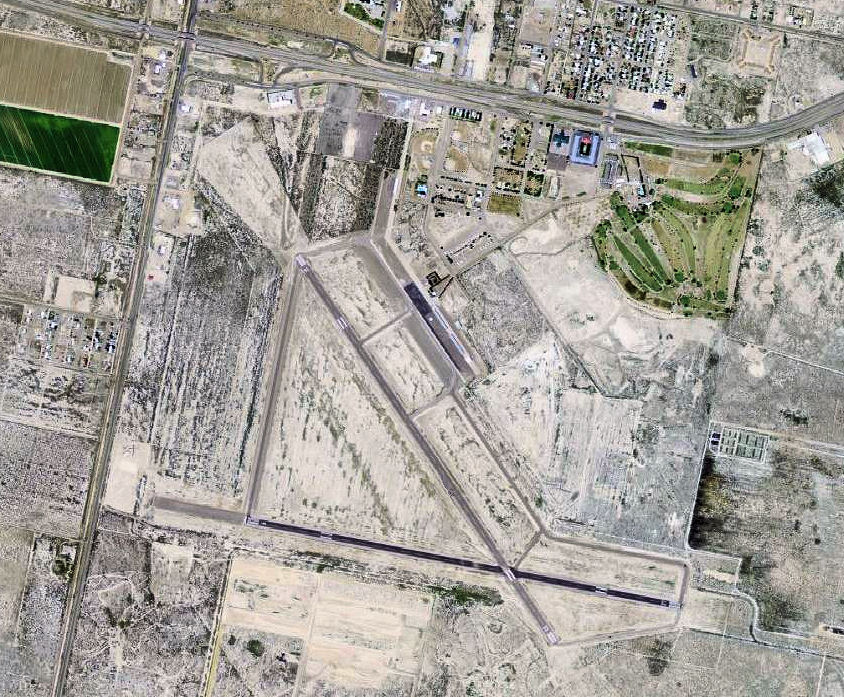
- 2006 USGS aerial image
- IATA: PEQ; ICAO: KPEQ; FAA LID: PEQ

Summary
- Airport type: Public
- Owner: City of Pecos
- Serves: Pecos, Texas
- Elevation AMSL: 2,613 ft / 796 m
- Coordinates: 31°22′57″N 103°30′39″W

Map
- Location

Runways
Direction	Length		Surface
Direction	ft	m	Surface
9/27	5,953	1,814	Asphalt
14/32	6,236	1,901	Asphalt

Statistics (2009)
- Aircraft operations: 20,050
- Based aircraft: 13
- Source: Federal Aviation Administration

Pecos Municipal Airport (IATA: PEQ, ICAO: KPEQ, FAA LID: PEQ) is a city-owned airport two miles southwest of Pecos, in Reeves County, Texas, United States. The FAA's National Plan of Integrated Airport Systems for 2009–2013 categorized it as a general aviation airport.

== Facilities ==
Pecos Municipal Airport covers 771 acres (312 ha) at an elevation of 2,613 feet (796 m). It has two asphalt runways: 9/27 is 5,953 by 80 feet (1,814 by 24 m) and 14/32 is 6,236 by 80 feet (1,901 by 24 m).

In the year ending August 12, 2009 the airport had 20,050 aircraft operations, average 54 per day: 71% general aviation and 29% military. 13 aircraft were then based at the airport: 84.6% single-engine, 7.7% multi-engine and 7.7% helicopter.

== History ==
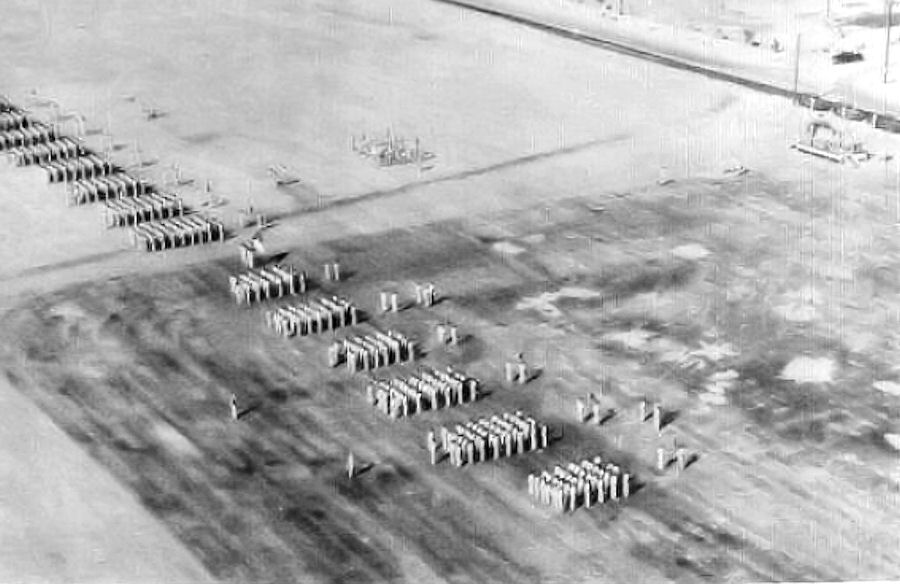
Cadet formation on parking ramp, 1943

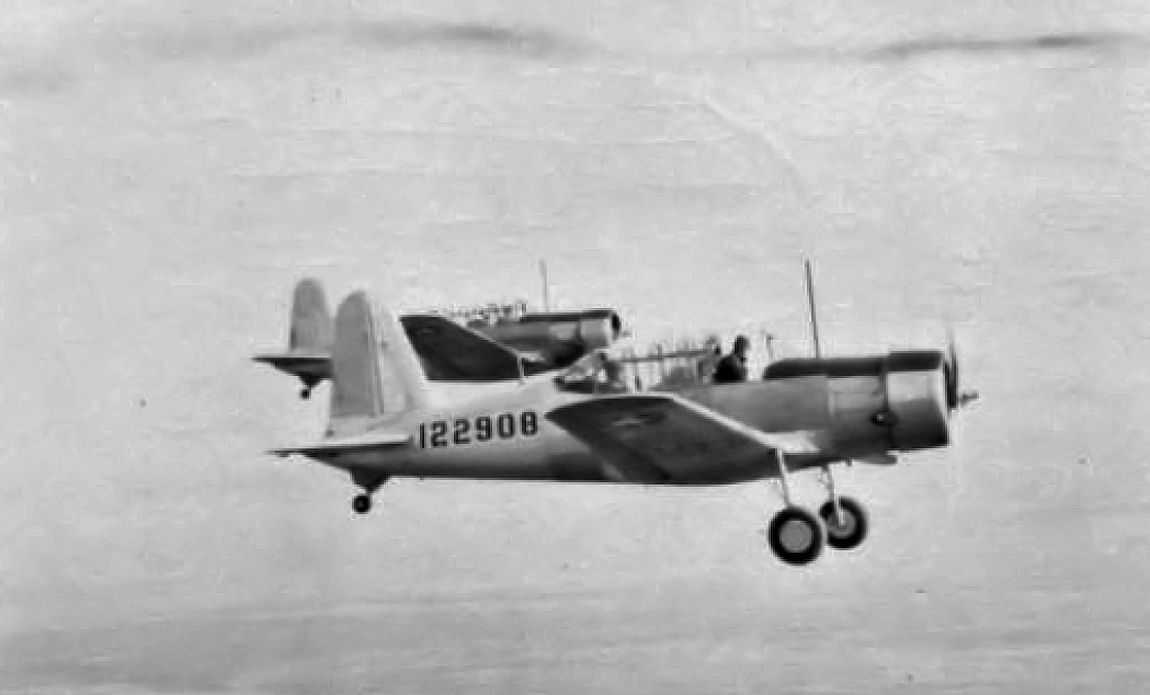
Basic School Vultee BT-13 Single Engine Trainers fly in formation

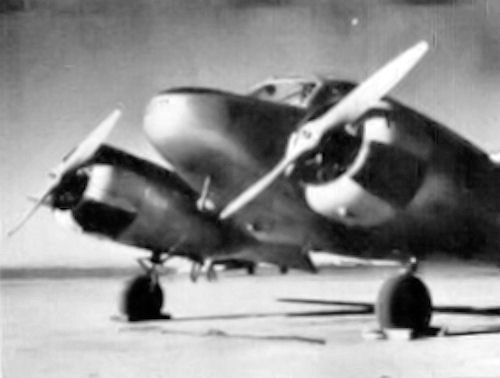
Advanced School Cessna AT-17 Bobcat Two Engine Trainer

The airport opened as Pecos Airport on 400 acres (1.6 km^{2}) three miles (4.8 km) south and slightly west of Pecos. Proceeds of a $10,000 bond issue authorized in an election on September 14, 1940, were used for land purchase. The site was cleared, fenced, and graded under a Work Projects Administration contract.

The attack on Pearl Harbor galvanized the Army Air Force into launching a training program, first for 50,000 and then for 70,000 pilots, and Pecos was chosen as one of five new training fields. Because more land was required for the long runways necessary for novice pilots, the town council promptly called another bond election to authorize an additional $50,000. The field's size was increased to 1,834 acres (7.42 km^{2}), accommodating one runway 7,200 feet (2,200 m) long and two others of 6,200 feet (1,900 m) each. Following the formal announcement of a military base on March 25, 1942, construction contracts were let in May. Both the construction and the early flying phases of the base were handicapped by wind-whipped dust until late 1943, when extensive palliation efforts relieved the situation.

=== Pecos Army Airfield ===
Designated as Pecos Army Airfield (PAAF), the field was activated on 11 July 1942 while still under construction. It was assigned to the United States Army Air Forces Western Flying Training Command, 38th Flying Training Wing as a primary (level 1) pilot training airfield. The first commander, Col. Harry C. Wisehart, arrived on June 28, 1942, as project officer. The first military units to arrive were the 744th School Squadron (100 men) and the 341st Air Base Squadron (18 men). A week later five more school squadrons, each with 80 men, arrived from Lemoore Army Air Field, California, as the vanguard of the eventual population of 4,000. It first was used as a basic pilot school. Pilot training aircraft included the Cessna AT-17 and the North American BT-14.

At its peak, on April 30, 1944, the field numbered 4,304 people, including 482 officers, 972 cadets and student officers, 2,218 enlisted personnel (including 200 WACs), and 604 civilian employees, of which 25 were WASPs. This population, nearly as large as that of Pecos itself, placed a great strain on the town's resources.

PAAF consisted chiefly of "theater of operations" type buildings-cheap, rapidly constructed, single-story structures covered with black tarpaper. It also had two large hangars, extensive maintenance facilities, and barely adequate eating and living quarters. Off-base housing in Pecos and neighboring towns was very limited, for an even larger airfield, Pyote Air Force Base, had been built twenty miles (32 km) east. PAAF eventually set up dormitories and small apartments to house civilian employees and some military families on base.

The first Pecos class, designated 43-A, graduated 133 cadets and student officers after nine weeks of combined ground school and flight training. In all, PAAF produced seventeen classes of basic pilots at roughly one-month intervals, the classes varying from ninety to 528 men. With an elimination rate ranging from 3 percent to 29 percent per class, a total of 3,367 finished the course.

The field was re-designated an advanced pilot school (twin-engine) on December 29, 1943. As basic pilot training ended on January 7, 1944, no time was lost converting to advanced pilot training by the newly redesignated 3027th Army Air Forces Base Unit (Advanced 2-Engine). Col. Olin C. Bushey relieved Colonel Wisehart as commander on August 28, 1943, and was succeeded in turn by colonels Harry B. Fisher (August 19, 1944) and Harold D. Smith (March 3, 1945).

Advanced classes ranged in size from 245 to 526, and fewer students were washed out than in basic training. When the last advanced class at PAAF, 45-B, received silver wings and commissions as second lieutenants or appointments as flight officers on April 15, 1945, the active mission of the field ended. Twelve classes had by then produced 4,215 pilots.

The airfield was placed on "temporary standby" status on May 1, 1945, and was never again an active military installation. Although the city hoped for continuing federal use for the field, it was closed on May 12, 1945, and deactivated on August 30. A year later it returned to municipal control.

=== Airline service and civil use ===
Trans-Texas Airways (TTa) served the airport with scheduled passenger flights operated with Douglas DC-3 "Starliners" from the early 1950s until the early 1960s. In 1963, Trans-Texas was operating DC-3 service on a once a day round trip routing of San Antonio – San Angelo – Midland/Odessa – Pecos – El Paso. The airline discontinued service to Pecos that same year.

Over the years a section of the airfield was sold off, and the Interstate 20 freeway was constructed through a portion of it. Other portions were used for a hospital site, zoo and trailer park. The Pecos Municipal Airport continued to be located on the remaining airfield property, but most of the original military facilities were torn down. The last military hangar was dismantled in 1986, and the last barracks were torn down about 1987. In the 1990s the airport still used the four original runways that had been maintained since the 1940s. An original ramp and rotating beacon were still in use. The West of the Pecos Museum in Pecos maintained a permanent exhibit at Pecos Army Air Field.

== See also ==
- Texas World War II Army Airfields
- 38th Flying Training Wing (World War II)
- List of airports in Texas
