= New Mexico Airlines =

American airline

IATA	ICAO	Call sign
LW	NMI	TSUNAMI
- Founded: 2007; 19 years ago
- Ceased operations: 2015; 11 years ago
- Hubs: Albuquerque International Sunport
- Fleet size: 5
- Destinations: 2
- Parent company: Pacific Air Holdings
- Headquarters: Mesa, Arizona
- Key people: Greg Kahlstorf (CEO), Gabriel Kimbrell (DO), David Mantay (CP)
- Website: http://www.flynma.com

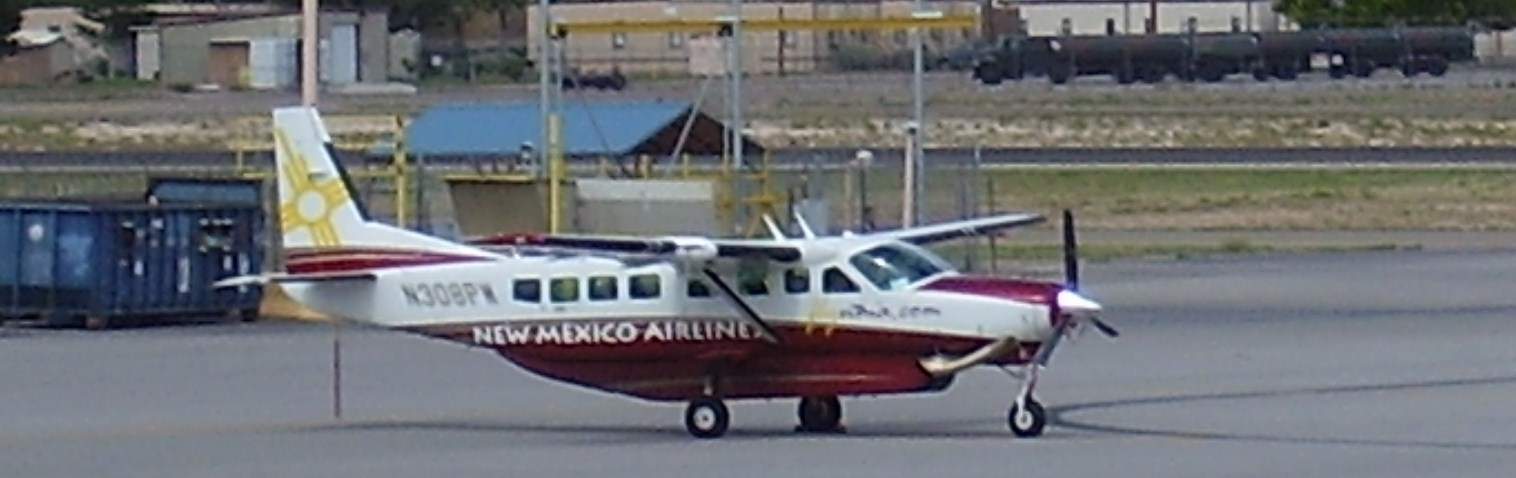
New Mexico Airlines aircraft

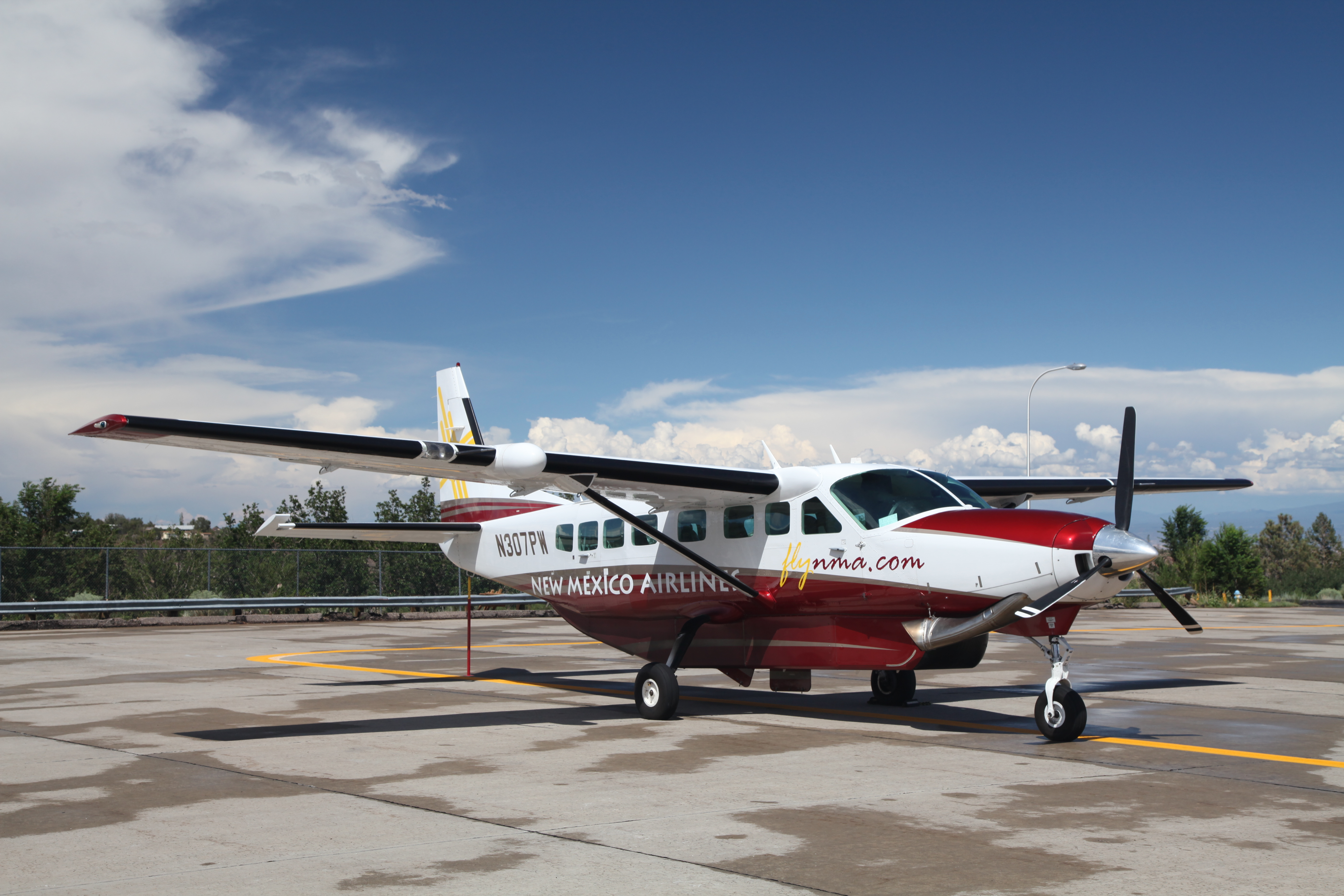
New Mexico Airlines aircraft

New Mexico Airlines was an American commuter airline brand founded by Pacific Air Holdings to operate flights in New Mexico after the airline was awarded an Essential Air Service contract to serve Hobbs and Carlsbad, New Mexico. The airline started flights on July 1, 2007, and uses the airline identifiers and call signs of its parent company Pacific Wings. Despite having "New Mexico" in the name, the brand was actually headquartered in Mesa, Arizona, in metropolitan Phoenix. The carrier had all of its aircraft grounded by the FAA in December 2014 due to unspecified maintenance issues. It was able to get some aircraft back in the air in early 2015 but completely shut down by May 2015.

== Previous destinations ==
- Alamogordo, New Mexico (Alamogordo-White Sands Regional Airport)
- Midland, Texas / Odessa, Texas
- Los Alamos, New Mexico (Los Alamos County Airport)(Contract Terminated as of January 23, 2015)
- Ruidoso, New Mexico (Sierra Blanca Regional Airport)
- Santa Fe, New Mexico (Santa Fe Municipal Airport)
- El Paso, Texas (El Paso International Airport)
- Hobbs, New Mexico (Lea County Regional Airport)
- Albuquerque, New Mexico (Albuquerque International Sunport)
- Carlsbad, New Mexico (Cavern City Air Terminal)

== Fleet ==
As of December 2014, the New Mexico Airlines fleet consisted of the following aircraft:

New Mexico Airlines Fleet
Aircraft	Total	Passengers
Cessna 208B Caravan 675	5	9

== See also ==
- List of defunct airlines of the United States
