= Tucumcari Municipal Airport =

Airport in Quay County, New Mexico

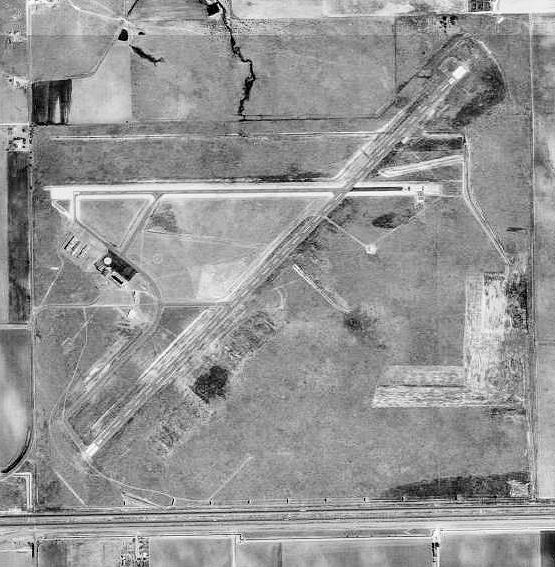
- 1991 USGS photo
- IATA: TCC; ICAO: KTCC; FAA LID: TCC

Summary
- Airport type: Public
- Owner: City of Tucumcari
- Location: Quay County, near Tucumcari, New Mexico
- Elevation AMSL: 4,065 ft / 1,239 m
- Coordinates: 35°10′58″N 103°36′11″W
- Interactive map of Tucumcari Municipal Airport

Runways
Direction	Length		Surface
Direction	ft	m	Surface
03/21	7,104	2,165	Asphalt
08/26	4,600	1,402	Asphalt

Statistics (2024)
- Aircraft operations (year ending 4/3/2024): 25,300
- Based aircraft: 12

Tucumcari Municipal Airport (IATA: TCC, ICAO: KTCC, FAA LID: TCC) is about six miles (9.7 km) east of Tucumcari, New Mexico.

The facility covers 1,160 acres (469 ha) and has two asphalt runways.

== History ==
=== Military use ===
Opened in August 1941, Tucumcari Municipal Airport was built by the United States Army Air Forces and at the time it was known as Fort Sumner Army Auxiliary Airfield #7, being subordinate to Fort Sumner Army Air Field. The airfield provided primary glider pilot training.

The glider school was operated under contract by the Cutter-Carr Flying Service, under the general supervision of the 9th Glider Training Detachment, 36th Flying Training Wing, Western Flying Training Command. Training was conducted using Aeronca TG-5 combat training gliders, towed by C-47 Skytrain aircraft.

The flight cadets consisted of both experienced sailplane pilots and others who had washed out of conventional pilot training and were given a second chance to fly. The possibility of officer's pay and the chance to fly attracted a particular breed of risk-tolerant trainees. Trainees were given instruction on how to follow a tow plane and fly the unpowered aircraft to the designated landing zone.

Unlike powered pilots, combat training was also provided, as once a pilot committed to a landing and discovered, as he got closer, frequently the landing zone was under fire, mined, or otherwise obstructed, and he would have little room to maneuver to make a safe landing. Once the landing was made, the glider pilot then became another infantryman.

Once the glider pilot cadet successfully completed primary training, he moved on to advanced training, taught by USAAF instructors at several military glider schools.

The school closed in March 1943 as part of the drawdown of the Army Air Forces pilot training program. It was declared surplus and turned over to the United States Army Corps of Engineers.

The facility became a prisoner of war camp in March 1944.

The airport was eventually discharged to the War Assets Administration (WAA) after the end of World War II.

=== Civil use ===
Pioneer Air Lines served the airport from 1948 until 1953–1954, one of several stops on its route between Albuquerque, New Mexico, and Dallas, Texas. Douglas DC-3s were used at first, replaced by 36-seat Martin 2-0-2s in 1953.

Trans Central Airlines briefly served Tucumcari in 1970 with Cessna 402s, flying to Albuquerque and Amarillo, Texas.

Air freight carrier South Aero currently provides feeder service for UPS Airlines with flights to Albuquerque. This service was formerly provided by Ameriflight during the 2010s.

=== Accidents and incidents ===
On November 5, 1951, Transocean Air Lines Flight 5763, a Martin 2-0-2 (N93039) with 29 people aboard, crashed in fog at Tucumcari Municipal Airport, killing one person.

== See also ==
- New Mexico World War II Army Airfields
- 36th Flying Training Wing (World War II)
- Fort Sumner Municipal Airport
