= Cavern City Air Terminal =

Airport in New Mexico, United States

Cavern City Air Terminal (former Carlsbad Army Airfield)
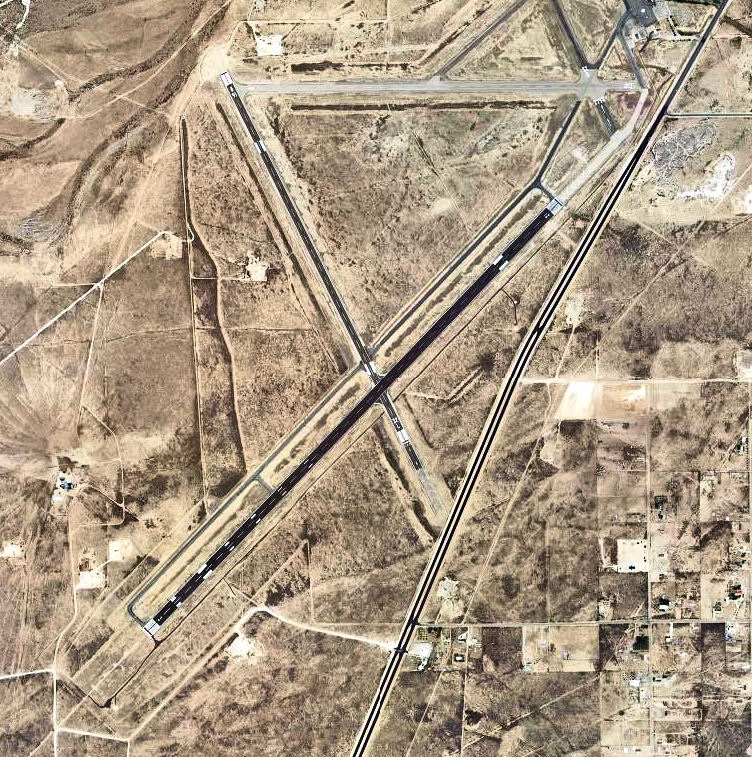
- USGS 2006 orthophoto
- IATA: CNM; ICAO: KCNM; FAA LID: CNM

Summary
- Airport type: Public
- Owner: City of Carlsbad
- Serves: Carlsbad, New Mexico
- Elevation AMSL: 3,295 ft (1,004 m)
- Coordinates: 32°20′15″N 104°15′48″W

Map
- Location of airport in New Mexico / United States CNM (the United States)

Runways
Direction	Length		Surface
Direction	ft	m	Surface
3/21	7,854	2,394	Asphalt
14L/32R	4,616	1,407	Asphalt
14R/32L	5,837	1,779	Asphalt
8/26	5,334	1,626	Asphalt

Statistics (2019)
- Aircraft operations: 8,649
- Based aircraft: 26
- Source: Federal Aviation Administration

Cavern City Air Terminal (IATA: CNM, ICAO: KCNM, FAA LID: CNM) is a public use airport in Eddy County, New Mexico, United States. It is owned by the city of Carlsbad and located five nautical miles (6 mi, 9 km) southwest of its central business district. The airport is served by one commercial airline, with scheduled passenger service subsidized by the Essential Air Service program.

== Facilities and aircraft ==
Cavern City Air Terminal covers an area of 1,980 acres (801 ha) at an elevation of 3,295 feet (1,004 m) above mean sea level. It has four runways with asphalt surfaces: 3/21 is 7,854 by 150 feet (2,394 x 46 m); 14L/32R is 4,616 by 150 feet (1,407 x 46 m); 14R/32L is 5,837 by 100 feet (1,779 x 30 m); 8/26 is 5,334 by 75 feet (1,626 x 23 m).

For the 12-month period ending December 31, 2019, the airport had 8,649 aircraft operations, an average of 24 per day: 37% general aviation, 60% scheduled commercial, and 3% military. At that time there were 26 aircraft based at this airport: 19 single-engine, 5 multi-engine, 1 jet, and 1 helicopter.

== Airline and destinations ==
Airlines	Destinations	Refs
Contour Airlines	Albuquerque, Denver	

=== Historical airline service ===
Continental Airlines was the first commercial air carrier to serve Carlsbad. Continental began service on May 14, 1940, with flights to El Paso and Denver, the latter included stops in Albuquerque and several other cities. Aircraft used were Lockheed Model 10 Electras and Lockheed Lodestars followed by the Douglas DC-3.

With the end of World War II, flights to Denver were discontinued and new flights were added going east to San Antonio and Kansas City, each making several stops. Flights to El Paso and Albuquerque remained. A small commuter carrier named Bison Airlines served the city for a couple years in the early 1960s as well. In 1963 Continental transferred its route authority for Carlsbad to Trans-Texas Airways which modified the eastbound flights to go directly to Dallas. Trans-Texas later changed their name to Texas International Airlines (TI) and replaced the DC-3s with 40-seat Convair 600 turboprop aircraft.

For a short time in the late 1970s, TI upgraded all flights with 85-seat Douglas DC-9-10 jets but reverted to the Convair 600s after about a year. In 1979 TI ended their service transferring their route authority over to commuter carriers Air Midwest and Crown Airlines. Crown operated flights to Albuquerque with Cessna 402 and Piper Navajo aircraft but went out of business in 1980.

Air Midwest used 17-seat Swearingen Metroliners on flights to Albuquerque and Midland/Odessa. In 1984 Mesa Airlines began service on the same routes using Beechcraft 99 and Beechcraft 1900 airliners. Air Midwest then left the city two years later. For a very short time in the spring of 1987, Continental Express operated by Trans Colorado Airlines served the city with flights to Albuquerque and El Paso also using Metroliners. Mesa continued their service until 2007 when they, like their predecessors, grew too large and discontinued serving small cities with small aircraft. Pacific Wings, dba New Mexico Airlines, then stepped in with flights to Albuquerque, El Paso, and Midland/Odessa but used much smaller and unpressurized Cessna 208 Caravans. Flights to El Paso and Midland were later dropped, and the carrier ended all service in 2015 when Boutique Air took over. Boutique began with one daily flight to Albuquerque and one to Dallas/Ft. Worth (DFW) using 8-seat Pilatus PC-12 aircraft. A second daily flight to Albuquerque was added in 2017. Service to El Paso was briefly operated in early 2021.

The airport also saw service by Big Sky Airlines for a brief time in 2000/2001, which operated flights to DFW using Swearingen Metroliners.

== Carlsbad Army Airfield ==
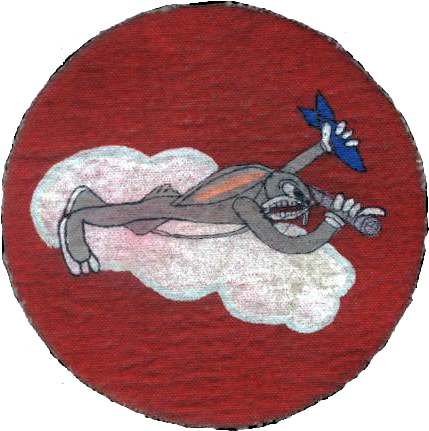
AAF Bombardier School patch, 1943

Carlsbad Army Air Field 1944 classbook

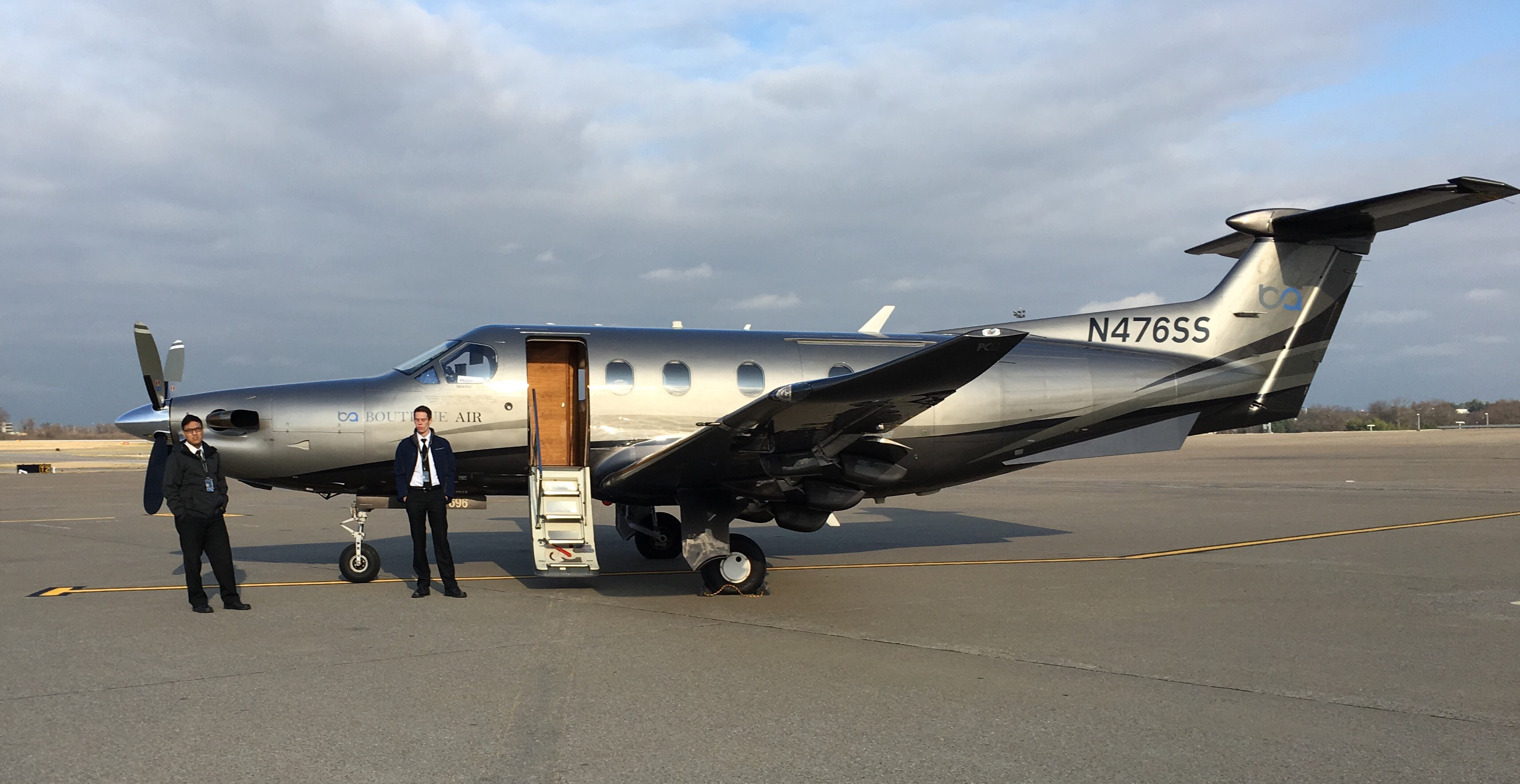
A Boutique Air PC-12

Carlsbad Army Airfield was activated on October 12, 1942 by the United States Army Air Corps. It was later assigned to the 38th Flying Training Wing (U.S. Army Air Forces) as an advanced (level 3) twin-engine training airfield. It began training flying cadets under the 940th Two-Engine Flying Training Detachment. It had a local auxiliary airfield for emergency and overflow landings.

The twin-engine school was replaced by a bombardier school in mid-1942. The school lasted from 12 to 18 weeks, during which a student dropped approximately 160 bombs, both in daytime and at night. Precise records were maintained of student hits and misses; the elimination rate was 12%. Upon graduation, a bombardier was transferred to an operational Second or Third Air Force training unit to join a crew being trained for overseas duty. The bombardier trainer used was the Beech AT-11 Kansan.

The Japanese surrender of September 2, 1945, ended World War II. Within a month, on September 30, 1945, the airfield was closed. It was turned over to the Army Corps of Engineers. It was eventually discharged to the War Assets Administration (WAA) and became a civil airport.

== Statistics ==
Passenger boardings (enplanements) by year, as per the FAA
Year	2009	2010	2011	2012	2013	2014	2015	2016	2017	2018	2019
Enplanements	3,417	2,606	2,707	2,776	2,600	1,758	1,827	3,057	3,972	5,124	5,224
Change	▲54.8%	▼23.7%	▲3.9%	▲2.6%	▼6.3%	▼32.4%	▲3.9%	▲67.3%	▲29.9%	▲29.0%	▲2.0%
Airline	New Mexico Airlines	New Mexico Airlines	New Mexico Airlines	New Mexico Airlines	New Mexico Airlines	New Mexico Airlines	Boutique Air	Boutique Air	Boutique Air	Boutique Air	Boutique Air
Destination(s)	Albuquerque El Paso Hobbs	Albuquerque El Paso Hobbs	Albuquerque Alamogordo Hobbs	Albuquerque	Albuquerque	Albuquerque	Albuquerque Dallas-Fort Worth	Albuquerque Dallas-Fort Worth	Albuquerque Dallas-Fort Worth	Albuquerque Dallas-Fort Worth	Albuquerque Dallas-Fort Worth

Passenger enplanements for 2020 were 2,961, 2021: 4,565, 2022: 5,309, 2023: 5,025.

== See also ==
- New Mexico World War II Army Airfields
- 38th Flying Training Wing (World War II)
- List of airports in New Mexico
- Bat bomb

== Other sources ==
- This article incorporates public domain material from the Air Force Historical Research Agency
- Manning, Thomas A. (2005), History of Air Education and Training Command, 1942–2002. Office of History and Research, Headquarters, AETC, Randolph AFB, Texas OCLC 71006954, 29991467
- Shaw, Frederick J. (2004), Locating Air Force Base Sites, History’s Legacy, Air Force History and Museums Program, United States Air Force, Washington DC. OCLC 57007862, 1050653629
