= Fort Sumner Municipal Airport =

Airport in New Mexico, United States

Fort Sumner Municipal Airport Fort Sumner Army Air Field
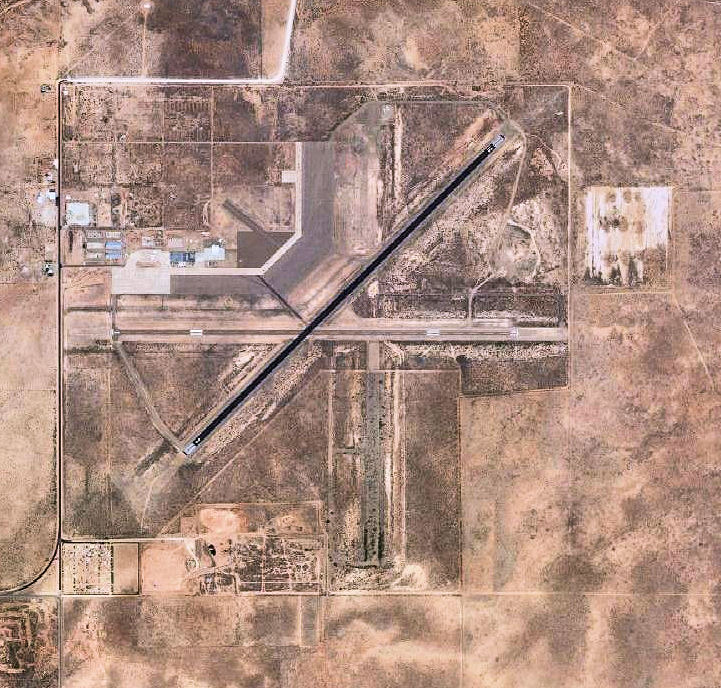
- USGS 2008 orthophoto
- IATA: FSU; ICAO: KFSU; FAA LID: FSU

Summary
- Airport type: Public
- Owner: Village of Fort Sumner
- Serves: Fort Sumner, New Mexico
- Elevation AMSL: 4,165 ft (1,269 m)
- Coordinates: 34°29′16″N 104°13′01″W

Map
- Location of airport in New Mexico

Runways
Direction	Length		Surface
Direction	ft	m	Surface
3/21	5,802	1,768	Asphalt
8/26	5,254	1,601	Asphalt

Statistics (2011)
- Aircraft operations: 150
- Based aircraft: 5
- Source: Federal Aviation Administration

Fort Sumner Municipal Airport (IATA: FSU, ICAO: KFSU, FAA LID: FSU) is a village owned, public use airport located two nautical miles (4 km) northeast of the central business district of Fort Sumner, a village in De Baca County, New Mexico, United States. It is included in the National Plan of Integrated Airport Systems for 2011–2015, which categorized it as a general aviation airport.

== History ==
The airfield's origins date to the 1920s when the Transcontinental Air Transport airline built an airfield in Fort Sumner as part of its coast-to-coast air passenger network, but the site was abandoned when the airline's ambitious plans collapsed in the Great Depression.

The airfield was reopened in February 1941, and was rebuilt in 1942 by the United States Army Air Forces as a World War II training airfield. It was assigned to the AAF Flying Training Command West Coast Training Center and was known as Fort Sumner Army Air Field. The flying cadets at the airfield were trained in advanced twin engine aircraft as phase three of their pilot training. The airfield had at least seven auxiliary landing fields, two of which have been identified:

- Fort Sumner Army Auxiliary Airfield #5 aka Taiban Field/Airport- Taiban 34°35′20″N 104°00′29″W
- Fort Sumner Army Auxiliary Airfield #7 - Tucumcari 35°10′58″N 103°36′11″W

The Tucumcari facility later became a Prisoner of War Camp in March 1944 as pilot training was phasing down. It is now Tucumcari Municipal Airport.

On August 6, 1944, the airfield was transferred to Second Air Force, where it became a replacement facility for B-17 Flying Fortress and B-24 Liberator crew training.

The facility was inactivated on November 15, 1945 and returned to civil control. It is now a public airport providing general aviation service.

The airport retains the large parking ramp from its training use. Two of the three wartime runways are still in use, the 00/18 runway now abandoned. The cantonment area street pattern still exists, with large numbers of foundations of wartime buildings still in evidence, including the foundations of a large cluster of what were probably the barracks of the POW Camp on the north side of the station.

== NASA use ==
In the 1980s, the airport was chosen as a launch site for NASA's high-altitude balloon program (see Columbia Scientific Balloon Facility). NASA spent about $100,000 to construct large insulated walls and air conditioning inside the one remaining wartime hangar so payloads could use the place in a controlled environment. Three bays with tall sliding doors that opened into the main hangar area provided a workable area for scientists and their payloads with large steel A-frames used to suspend the payloads. Other NASA buildings were constructed at the airport.

Currently two operational balloon launch campaigns are conducted at the airport each year. These occur in the May–June and September–October timeframe surrounding the two stratospheric turnaround events. The NASA Ft. Sumner facility has grown in capability over the years and now includes a machine shop and still utilizes the old World War II hangar as a work area, storage area for support vehicles, and a hangar for NSBF aircraft during balloon flight operations.

== Facilities and aircraft ==
Fort Sumner Municipal Airport covers an area of 960 acres (388 ha) at an elevation of 4,165 feet (1,269 m) above mean sea level. It has two asphalt paved runways: 3/21 is 5,802 by 75 feet (1,768 x 23 m) and 8/26 is 5,254 by 60 feet (1,601 x 18 m).

For the 12-month period ending April 9, 2011, the airport had 150 general aviation aircraft operations, an average of 12 per month. At that time there were five aircraft based at this airport: 60% single-engine and 40% multi-engine.

== See also ==
- New Mexico World War II Army Airfields
- 38th Flying Training Wing (World War II)
- List of airports in New Mexico
