= Los Alamos County Airport =

Airport in New Mexico, United States of America

Los Alamos Airport Los Alamos County Airport
- IATA: LAM; ICAO: KLAM; FAA LID: LAM

Summary
- Airport type: Public
- Owner: County of Los Alamos
- Serves: Los Alamos, New Mexico
- Elevation AMSL: 7,171 ft / 2,186 m
- Coordinates: 35°52′47″N 106°16′07″W
- Website: www.LAM.aero

Map
- Location of airport in New Mexico / United States LAM (the United States)

Runways
Direction	Length		Surface
Direction	ft	m	Surface
09/27	6,000	1,829	Asphalt

Statistics (2022)
- Aircraft operations (year ending 4/26/2022): 13,640
- Based aircraft: 46
- Source: FAA and airport website

Los Alamos Airport (IATA: LAM, ICAO: KLAM, FAA LID: LAM), also known as Los Alamos County Airport, is a county-owned, public-use airport in Los Alamos County, New Mexico, United States. It is located one nautical mile (2 km) east of the central business district of Los Alamos, New Mexico. This airport was included in the National Plan of Integrated Airport Systems (NPIAS) for 2011–2015, which categorized it as a general aviation facility. It maintained this categorization in the 2025-2029 NPIAS.

== History ==
The airport was built in 1947 by the Atomic Energy Commission as part of Los Alamos Scientific Laboratory, but the federal government transferred the facility to county ownership in 2008.

== Facilities ==
Los Alamos Airport covers an area of 89 acres (36 ha) at an elevation of 7,171 feet (2,186 m) above mean sea level. It has one runway designated 9/27 with an asphalt surface measuring 6,000 by 120 feet (1,829 x 37 m).

Because of the restricted airspace immediately to the south of the runway, and the noise-sensitive residential area just west of the runway, Los Alamos Airport employs a non-standard traffic pattern. All takeoffs, regardless of wind conditions, are to the east on runway 9. All landings, regardless of wind, are to the west on runway 27. Unlike many airports, the orientation of the runway at Los Alamos was chosen due to geographic necessity rather than preferential wind alignment. Pilots will frequently encounter a gusty crosswind at this airfield, particularly in spring. This fact, combined with the rugged terrain off the east end of the runway, has given LAM a reputation for being a challenging airport at which to land.

== Historical airline service ==
Los Alamos has seen scheduled passenger airline service to Albuquerque since the airport opened in 1947. Carco Airlines was the first, operating primarily Beechcraft Bonanzas through 1969 under contract with Los Alamos National Labs. A number of commuter airlines operated turboprop aircraft on the Los Alamos - Albuquerque route as well including Ross Aviation which was subsequently awarded the contract and flew de Havilland Canada DHC-6 Twin Otters through 1995. Occasionally Ross would operate larger, 50-seat de Havilland Canada DHC-7 Dash 7s when passenger loads warranted. According to the Official Airline Guide (OAG), in late 1988 Ross Aviation was operating nine departures every weekday from the airport nonstop to Albuquerque including four flights with the Dash 7 and five flights with the Twin Otter. Peacock Air briefly provided flights to Albuquerque in late 1995 using Swearingen Metroliners followed briefly by Mesa Airlines in 1997 with Beechcraft 1900D airliners. Rio Grande Air served the route from 1999 through 2000 and New Mexico Airlines from 2013 until the beginning of 2015, each carrier using Cessna 208 Caravan aircraft. Boutique Air was the most recent carrier serving Los Alamos from November 1, 2015 through April 30, 2016 using Pilatus PC-12 aircraft.

=== New Mexico Airlines ===
As of January 23, 2015, Los Alamos County terminated its contract with Pacific Wings subsidiary New Mexico Airlines, which offered service to Albuquerque International Sunport. The county issued a request for qualifications to seek a replacement carrier.

=== Boutique Air ===
Due to low passenger count, Boutique Air terminated all flights flying from Los Alamos County Airport to Albuquerque Sunport on April 30, 2016. No airlines currently serve Los Alamos. On November 20, 2017, the Los Alamos County Council approved funding to promote the use of Santa Fe Regional Airport instead of seeking replacement service.

== Operations ==
For the 12-month period ending April 26, 2022, the airport had 13,640 aircraft operations, an average of 37 per day: 99% general aviation, <1% air taxi, and <1% military.

At that time there were 46 aircraft based at this airport: 45 single-engine, and 1 helicopter.

== Services ==
Los Alamos Airport has numerous services available for local and visiting pilots: a flight planning room, open 24 hours a day to pilots, which includes an internet-connected computer, telephone, and free WiFi connectivity. A bathroom is open 24 hours a day to pilots. The airport also has self-serve 100LL fuel available 24 hours a day, courtesy car, and a nearby bus stop.
