= Fort Morgan Municipal Airport =

Airport in Morgan County, Colorado

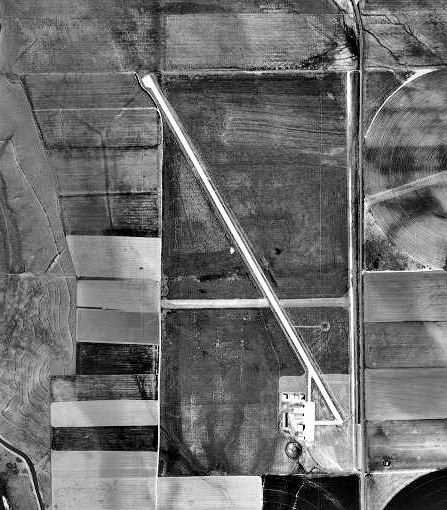
- USGS 1998 orthophoto
- IATA: none; ICAO: KFMM; FAA LID: FMM

Summary
- Airport type: Public
- Owner: City of Fort Morgan
- Serves: Fort Morgan, Colorado
- Elevation AMSL: 4,569 ft (1,393 m)
- Coordinates: 40°20′02″N 103°48′15″W
- Website: CityOfFortMorgan.com/...

Map
- Location in Colorado

Runways
Direction	Length		Surface
Direction	ft	m	Surface
14/32	5,219	1,591	Concrete
17/35	3,800	1,158	Dirt/turf
8/26	2,467	752	Turf

Statistics (2011)
- Aircraft operations: 9,543
- Based aircraft: 23
- Source: Federal Aviation Administration

Fort Morgan Municipal Airport (ICAO: KFMM, FAA LID: FMM, formerly 3V4) is an uncontrolled airport located six miles north of Fort Morgan, in Morgan County, Colorado, United States. The airport is in the city limits in a detached section of the city. The National Plan of Integrated Airport Systems for 2011–2015 categorized it as a general aviation facility.

Many U.S. airports use the same three-letter location identifier for the FAA and IATA, but this airport is FMM to the FAA and has no IATA code (Memmingen Airport in Memmingen, Germany has IATA code FMM).

== Facilities ==
The airport covers 324 acres (131 ha) at an elevation of 4,569 feet (1,393 m). It has three runways: 14/32 is 5,219 by 60 feet (1,591 x 18 m) concrete; 17/35 is 3,800 by 30 feet (1,158 x 9 m) dirt/turf; 8/26 is 2,467 by 100 feet (752 x 30 m) turf.

In 2011 the airport had 9,543 aircraft operations, average 26 per day: 90% general aviation, 8% air taxi, and 2% military. 23 aircraft were then based at this airport: 96% single-engine and 4% multi-engine.

== History ==
The Fort Morgan Municipal Airport was dedicated in 1933 as Young Municipal Field. Agriculture was the mainstay of the community, and the crop spraying and dusting business became the focus of the airport. In April 1940, the airport was leased by the United States Army Air Corps as part of the military buildup prior to World War II. It was used by the Air Corps as a glider pilot training school.

The glider school was operated under contract by Plains Airways, Inc., under the general supervision of the 1st Glider Training Detachment, 36th Flying Training Wing, Western Flying Training Command. Training was conducted using Taylorcraft TG-6A and Aeronca TG-5 combat training gliders, towed by C-47 Skytrain aircraft. An all-way turf airfield with a 5,200' x 5,200' landing/takeoff area was used for flight operations.

The flight cadets consisted of both experienced sailplane pilots and others who had washed out of conventional pilot training and were given a second chance to fly. The possibility of officer's pay and the chance to fly attracted a particular breed of risk-tolerant trainees. Trainees were given instruction on how to follow a tow plane and fly the unpowered aircraft to the designated landing zone.

Unlike powered pilots, combat training was also provided, as once a pilot committed to a landing and discovered, as he got closer, frequently the landing zone was under fire, mined, or otherwise obstructed, he had little room to maneuver to make a safe landing. Once the landing was made, the glider pilot then became another infantryman.

Once the glider pilot cadet successfully completed primary training, he moved on to advanced training, taught by AAF instructors at several military glider schools.

The school was closed in November, 1943 as part of the drawdown of the Army Air Forces pilot training program. It was declared surplus and turned over to the Army Corps of Engineers, and eventually discharged to the War Assets Administration (WAA) after the end of World War II.

On Sunday, August 31, 2025, two planes attempting to land on Runway 14 collided in mid-air and crashed in a nearby field; one person was killed, one was hospitalized, two other people sustained minor injuries.

== See also ==
- 36th Flying Training Wing (World War II)
- List of airports in Colorado
