= Artesia Municipal Airport =

Airport in Eddy County, New Mexico

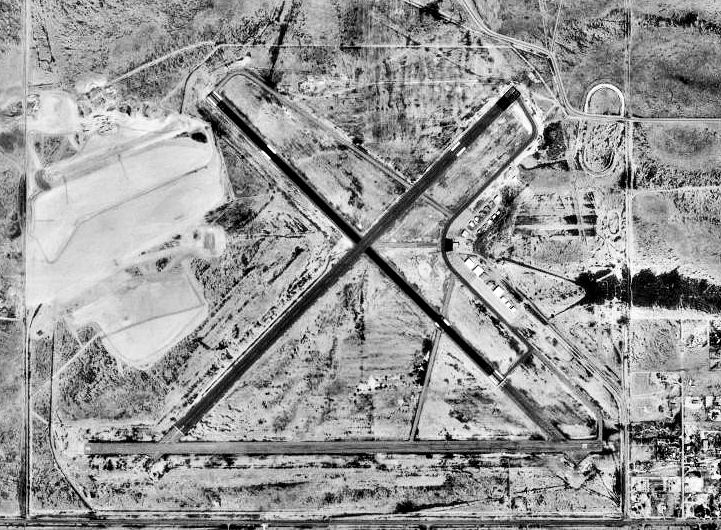
- USGS 1997 orthophoto
- IATA: ATS; ICAO: KATS; FAA LID: ATS

Summary
- Airport type: Public
- Owner: City of Artesia
- Serves: Artesia, New Mexico
- Elevation AMSL: 3,545 ft (1,081 m)
- Coordinates: 32°51′09″N 104°28′04″W

Map
- Location of airport in New Mexico

Runways
Direction	Length		Surface
Direction	ft	m	Surface
4/22	6,800	2,073	Asphalt
13/31	6,132	1,869	Asphalt

Statistics (2023)
- Aircraft operations (year ending 4/1/2023): 15,550
- Based aircraft: 25
- Source: Federal Aviation Administration

Artesia Municipal Airport (IATA: ATS, ICAO: KATS, FAA LID: ATS) is a city-owned, public-use airport located three nautical miles (6 km) west of the central business district of Artesia, a city in Eddy County, New Mexico, United States. It is included in the National Plan of Integrated Airport Systems for 2011–2015, which categorized it as a general aviation facility.

== History ==
During 1943 and 1944 the airfield was used by the United States Army Air Forces as a contract glider training airfield. Big Spring Flying Service provided instruction. The mission of the school was to train glider pilot students in proficiency in operation of gliders in various types of towed and soaring flight, both day and night, and in servicing of gliders in the field. The facility used primarily C-47 Skytrains and Waco CG-4 unpowered gliders.

The facility was deactivated on September 8, 1944, with the drawdown of AAFTC's pilot training program. It was declared surplus and turned over to the Army Corps of Engineers on September 30, 1945. It was eventually discharged to the War Assets Administration (WAA) and returned to being a civil airport.

The airport saw scheduled airline service in 1963/1964 from Bison Airlines and again in 1975 through 1978 from Roswell Airlines which provided flights to Albuquerque and El Paso. Roswell Airlines changed to New Mexico Air before the company ceased operations.

== Facilities and aircraft ==
Artesia Municipal Airport covers an area of 1,440 acres (583 ha) at an elevation of 3,545 feet (1,080 m) above mean sea level. It has two runways with asphalt surfaces: 4/22 is 6,800 by 150 feet (2,073 x 46 m) and 13/31 is 6,132 by 100 feet (1,869 x 30 m).

For the 12-month period ending April 1, 2023, the airport had 15,550 general aviation aircraft operations, an average of 43 per day. At that time there were 25 aircraft based at this airport: 20 single-engine, 4 multi-engine, and 1 jet.

== See also ==
- New Mexico World War II Army Airfields
- 36th Flying Training Wing (World War II)
