= Alamogordo–White Sands Regional Airport =

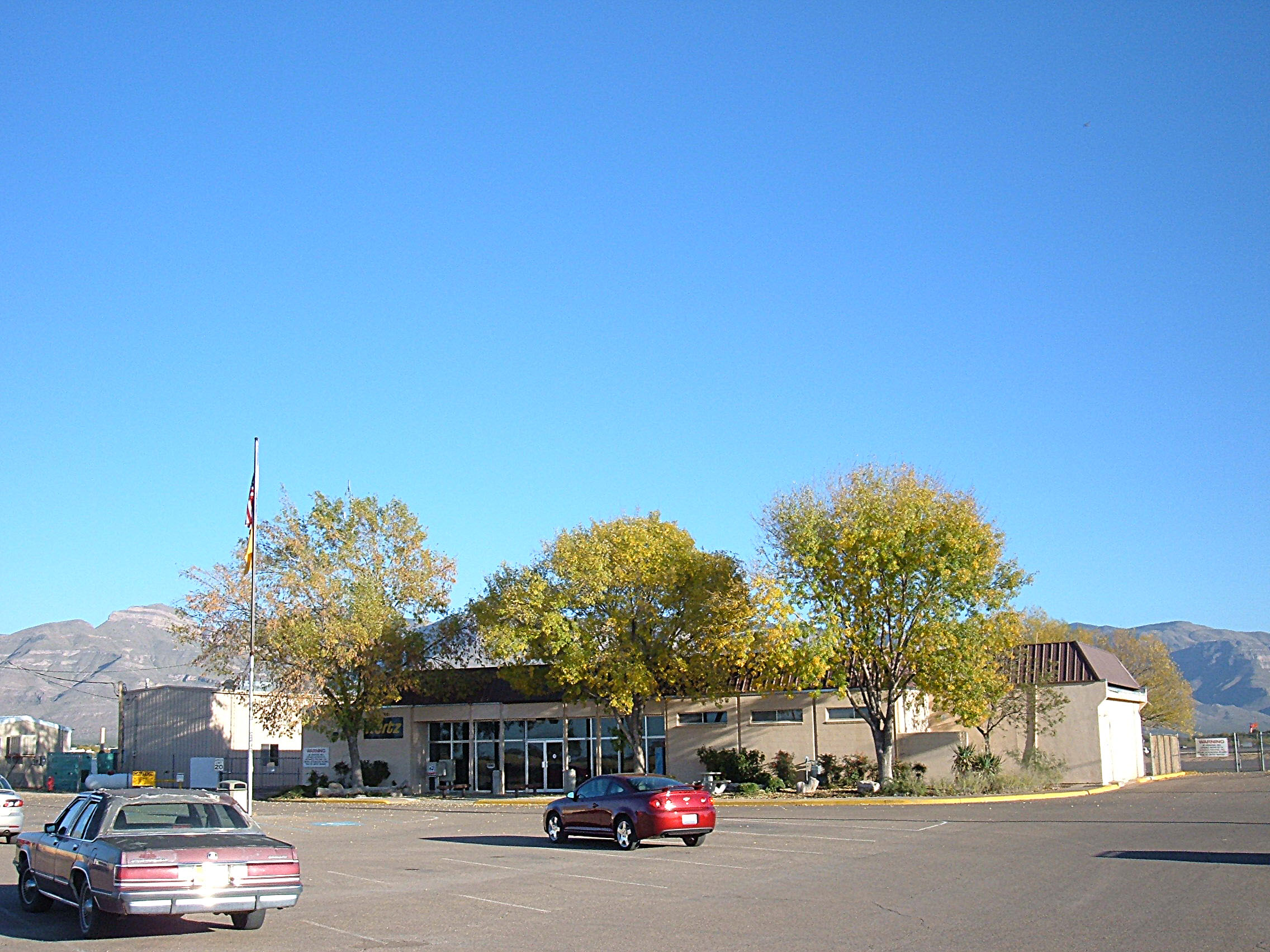
- Airport terminal building
- IATA: ALM; ICAO: KALM; FAA LID: ALM

Summary
- Airport type: Public
- Owner: City of Alamogordo
- Serves: Alamogordo, New Mexico
- Elevation AMSL: 4,200 ft (1,300 m)
- Coordinates: 32°50′24″N 105°59′26″W

Map
- Location of airport in New Mexico

Runways
| Direction | Length | | Surface |
| Direction | ft | m | Surface |
|---|---|---|---|
| 4/22 | 9,207 | 2,806 | Asphalt |
| 17/35 | 3,257 | 993 | Dirt |

Statistics (2023)
- Aircraft operations (year ending 4/2/2023): 34,100
- Based aircraft: 85
- Source: Federal Aviation Administration

Alamogordo–White Sands Regional Airport (IATA: ALM, ICAO: KALM, FAA LID: ALM) is a city-owned public-use airport located four nautical miles (5 mi, 7 km) southwest of the central business district of Alamogordo, a city in Otero County, New Mexico. It opened in 1959 and was formerly known as Alamogordo Municipal Airport. The airport was the home for Black Hills Aviation, with a fleet of fire fighting aircraft. The company was bought out by Neptune Aviation in 1993 and moved to Missoula, Montana. Neptune still bases some of its current fleet of British Aerospace 146 jets at Alamogordo during active forest fire seasons. The airport also sees large MD-87 firefighting jets operated by Erickson Aero Tanker.

The airport does not presently have any commercial air service. New Mexico Airlines discontinued service to the airport on April 1, 2012 after the airport lost eligibility for subsidies through the Essential Air Service program.

As per Federal Aviation Administration records, the airport had 414 passenger boardings (enplanements) in calendar year 2008, 505 enplanements in 2009, and 369 in 2010. It is included in the National Plan of Integrated Airport Systems for 2011–2015, which categorized it as a general aviation airport (the commercial service category requires at least 2,500 enplanements per year).

== Facilities and aircraft ==
Alamogordo–White Sands Regional Airport covers an area of 1,465 acres (593 ha) at an elevation of 4,200 feet (1,280 m) above mean sea level. It has two runways: 4/22 is 9,207 by 150 feet (2,135 x 46 m) with an asphalt surface; 16/34 is 3,257 by 190 feet (1,993 x 58 m) with a dirt surface.

For the 12-month period ending April 30, 2023, the airport had 34,100 aircraft operations, an average of 93 per day: 94% general aviation, 6% military, and <1% air taxi. At that time there were 85 aircraft based at this airport: 70 single-engine, 7 multi-engine, 1 jet, 2 helicopter, 4 glider, and 1 ultralight.

The airport installed an 8-kilowatt solar photovoltaic array in November 2008, using a $100,000 grant from the New Mexico Energy, Minerals and Natural Resources Department. The system is estimated to save the airport $100 to $300 per month, and after 2012, when the new buyback rate goes into effect, that amount may rise to $300 to $500 per month in electric costs savings.

== Airlines and destinations ==
=== Cargo ===
| Airlines | Destinations |
|---|---|
| South Aero | Albuquerque |

=== Historical airline service ===
Continental Airlines provided the first commercial airline service to Alamogordo, beginning on August 31, 1954, with their flights between El Paso and Albuquerque making a stop at the city. Douglas DC-3 aircraft were first used, later upgrading to the Convair 340 followed by the four-engine Vickers Viscount turboprop in 1959. Air service was first operated at Holloman Air Force Base and then moved to the Alamogordo Municipal Airport (now the White Sands Regional Airport) when it opened in late-1959. By 1960, Continental was operating daily Vickers Viscount propjet service on a roundtrip routing of Denver, Colorado Springs. Pueblo, Santa Fe, Albuquerque, Alamogordo, and El Paso. As Continental was continuing its growth as a major air carrier, its Alamogordo service was transferred to Frontier Airlines in 1963. Frontier began flights to Albuquerque and El Paso with the 50-seat Convair 580 turboprop aircraft however the El Paso flights were later dropped.

In the late-1970s, two small commuter airlines began service, Zia Airlines with Handley Page Jetstream propjets flights to Albuquerque and Airways of New Mexico to El Paso. By late-1979, Frontier was in the midst of becoming an all-jet airline and thus discontinued its Alamogordo service with commuter airlines continuing to serve the airport. Zia ceased operating in early 1980 and Air Midwest then began flights to Albuquerque with Swearingen Metroliner propjet commuter aircraft later that year. Airways of New Mexico also initiated flights to Albuquerque with Air Midwest ending their service in 1981. Airways of New Mexico ceased operating in 1985 at which time Mesa Airlines began service with Beechcraft 99 and Beechcraft 1900 turboprop airliners. JetAire, a new commuter airline operating Handley Page Jetstream propjets, also served the Alamogordo to Albuquerque market for a few months in 1985.

In the spring of 1987, Trans-Colorado Airlines, operating as Continental Express on behalf of Continental Airlines via a code sharing agreement, briefly provided flights for several months to El Paso using Swearingen Metroliners. Another short-lived commuter airline, Air Ruidoso, briefly provided flights to Albuquerque and El Paso in the spring of 1988. Mesa's service to Albuquerque continued until 2002, when Rio Grande Air was awarded a federal Essential Air Service (EAS) contract for subsidized flying to smaller U.S. cities. Two years later, Rio Grande Air ceased operations and the EAS contract was then awarded to Westward Airlines which only operated for a few months in 2005 before suspending operations as well. The EAS contract was then given to Valley Air Express; however, this airline was still on the drawing board and never got off the ground. Mesa Airlines was then ordered to return to Alamogordo until early 2008 when Pacific Wings, dba New Mexico Airlines, began service using single engine, nine-seat Cessna 208 Caravan turboprop aircraft. The Caravan is an unpressurized and smaller and slower type of aircraft and passenger traffic dwindled causing the EAS subsidies to be cancelled in 2012. New Mexico Airlines ended their flights and the city has not seen airline service since. The city is reportedly working with a major air carrier in order to hopefully reinstate passenger air service with regional jets.

== Other sources ==
- Essential Air Service documents (Docket OST-1996-1901) from the U.S. Department of Transportation:
  - Order 2002-4-18 (April 25, 2002): selecting Rio Grande Air to provide subsidized basic essential air service for a two-year period at Alamogordo/Holloman Air Force Base, New Mexico, for an annual subsidy rate of $849,235.
  - Order 2004-10-9 (October 21, 2004): selecting Westward Airways, Inc., to provide essential air service with nine-passenger Pilatus PC-12 aircraft at Alamogardo/Holloman Air Force Base, New Mexico, for two years at an annual subsidy rate of $518,870.
  - Order 2005-10-16 (October 21, 2005): selecting Valley Air Express, Inc., to provide essential air service with nine-passenger, twin-engine aircraft at Alamogordo/Holloman Air Force Base, New Mexico, for two years at an annual subsidy rate of $592,170.
  - Order 2006-5-24 (June 1, 2006): tentatively selects Mesa Air Group, Inc. d/b/a Air Midwest to provide essential air service (EAS) with 19-passenger Beech 1900D aircraft at Alamogordo, New Mexico, for two years, beginning when the carrier inaugurates service. The annual subsidy rate will be set at $717,506.
  - Order 2007-6-13 (June 18, 2007): prohibiting Air Midwest, Inc., from suspending service and requesting proposals from carriers interested in providing replacement essential air service (EAS) at all of the captioned communities listed in this order (Roswell, NM; Alamogordo/Holloman Air Force Base, NM; Cedar City, UT; Moab, UT; Vernal, UT; Ely, NV; Merced, CA; Visalia, CA).
  - Order 2007-9-29 (October 1, 2007): selecting Pacific Wings L.L.C., d/b/a New Mexico Airlines, to provide subsidized essential air service (EAS) with 9-seat Cessna Grand Caravan (C-208B) turboprop aircraft at Alamogordo/Holloman Air Force Base, New Mexico, for the two-year period beginning when the carrier inaugurates full service, for an annual subsidy rate of $994,623.
  - Order 2009-11-14 (November 19, 2009): re-selecting Pacific Wings L.L.C., d/b/a New Mexico Airlines (New Mexico Airlines), to provide subsidized essential air service (EAS) with 9-seat Cessna Grand Caravan (C-208B) turboprop aircraft at Alamogordo/Holloman Air Force Base, New Mexico, for the two-year period beginning January 1, 2010, for an annual subsidy rate of $1,169,337.
  - Tentative Order 2011-12-8 (December 16, 2011): directing interested persons to show cause why the Department should not terminate the eligibility of Alamogordo/Holloman Air Force Base, New Mexico under the Essential Air Service (EAS) program and allow Pacific Wings L.L.C., d/b/a New Mexico Airlines, to suspend service at the community. New Mexico Airlines was the only air carrier to submit a proposal in response to Order 2011-7-2 and would continue to provide 12 weekly nonstop round trips each week between the community and Albuquerque, utilizing nine-passenger Cessna Grand Caravan (C-208B) turboprop aircraft, for an annual subsidy rate of $1,187,531. Public Law 112-27, signed into law on August 5, 2011, amended the definition of “eligible place” for the purpose of receiving EAS. See 49 U.S.C. § 41731. The amendment, among other things, states that to be eligible, a community must have had an average subsidy per passenger of less than $1,000 during the most recent fiscal year, as determined by the Secretary of Transportation.
  - Final Order 2012-2-14 (February 17, 2012): terminating the eligibility of Alamogordo/Holloman Air Force Base, New Mexico (Alamogordo), under the Essential Air Service (EAS) program; and allowing Pacific Wings L.L.C., d/b/a New Mexico Airlines, to suspend service at the community, if it chooses.
