= Conchas Lake Airport =

Airport in New Mexico, US

- IATA: none; ICAO: none; FAA LID: E89

Summary
- Airport type: Public
- Owner: New Mexico DOT - Aviation Division
- Serves: Conchas Dam, New Mexico
- Elevation AMSL: 4,230 ft (1,290 m)
- Coordinates: 35°22′06″N 104°10′52″W
- Interactive map of Conchas Lake Airport

Runways
Direction	Length		Surface
Direction	ft	m	Surface
9/27	4,790	1,460	Asphalt

Statistics (2005)
- Aircraft operations: 1,000
- Source: Federal Aviation Administration. Coordinates from WikiMapia.

Conchas Lake Airport (FAA LID: E89) is a public use airport located one nautical mile (2 km) southwest of the central business district of Conchas Dam, in San Miguel County, New Mexico, United States. It is owned by the New Mexico Department of Transportation - Aviation Division.

== Facilities and aircraft ==
Conchas Lake Airport covers an area of 60 acres (24 ha) at an elevation of 4,230 feet (1,289 m) above mean sea level. It has one runway designated 9/27 with a 4,790 x 60 ft (1,460 x 18 m) asphalt surface. For the 12-month period ending April 30, 2005, the airport had 1,000 general aviation aircraft operations, an average of 83 per month.

== See also ==
- Conchas Lake Seaplane Base
