= Conchas Lake Seaplane Base =

- IATA: none; ICAO: none; FAA LID: E61

Summary
- Airport type: Public
- Owner: U.S. Army Corps of Engineers
- Serves: Conchas Dam, New Mexico
- Elevation AMSL: 4,201 ft (1,280 m)
- Coordinates: 35°23′03″N 104°12′59″W
- Interactive map of Conchas Lake Seaplane Base

Runways
Direction	Length		Surface
Direction	ft	m	Surface
ALL/WAY	21,120	6,437	Water
- Source: Federal Aviation Administration

Conchas Lake Seaplane Base (FAA LID: E61) is a public use seaplane base located two nautical miles (4 km) southwest of the central business district of Conchas Dam, in San Miguel County, New Mexico, United States. It is owned by the U.S. Army Corps of Engineers. It has one seaplane landing area measuring 21,120 by 1,320 feet (6,437 by 402 m).

== See also ==
- Conchas Lake Airport
