= Hobbs Army Airfield =

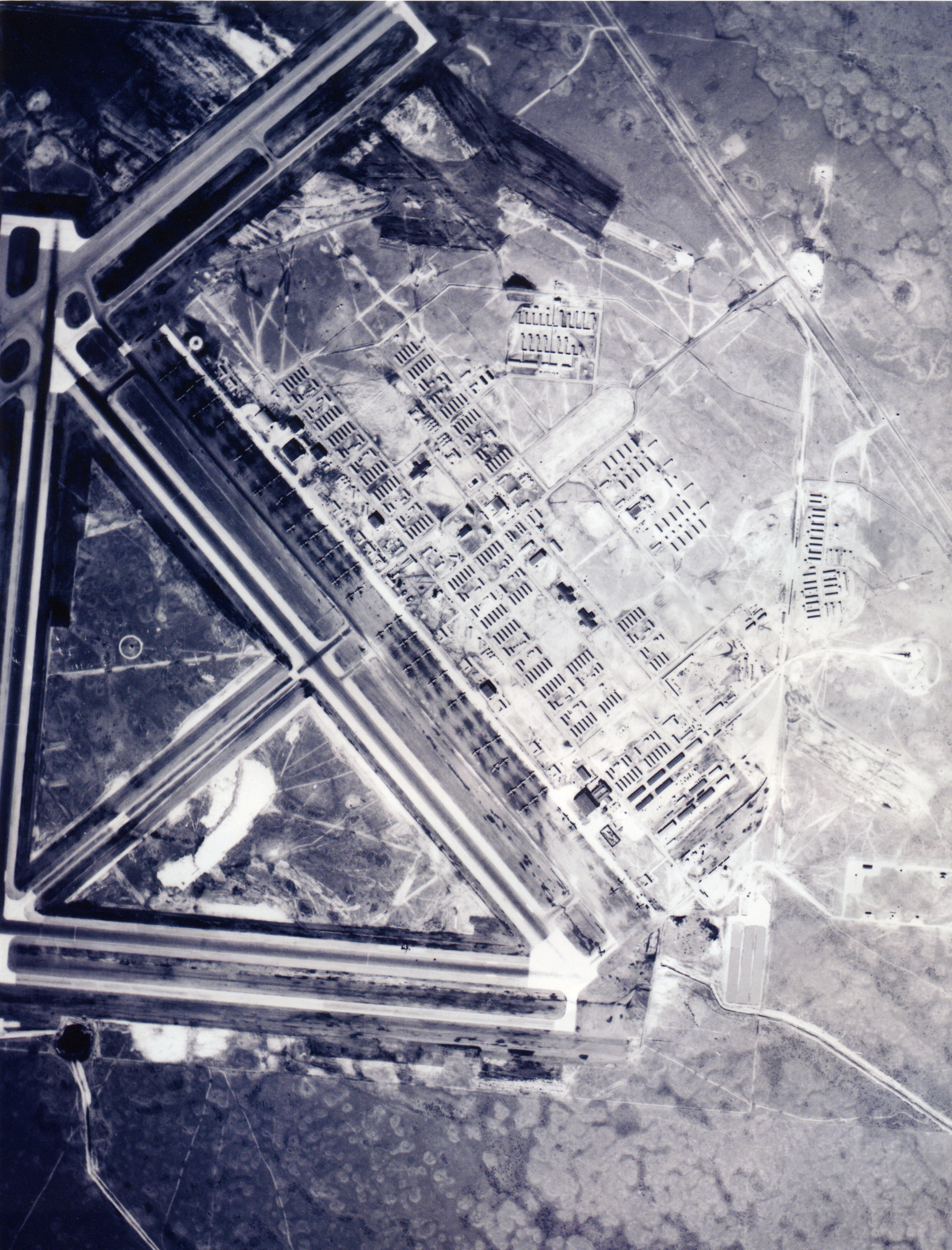
- Hobbs Army Airfield in 1943

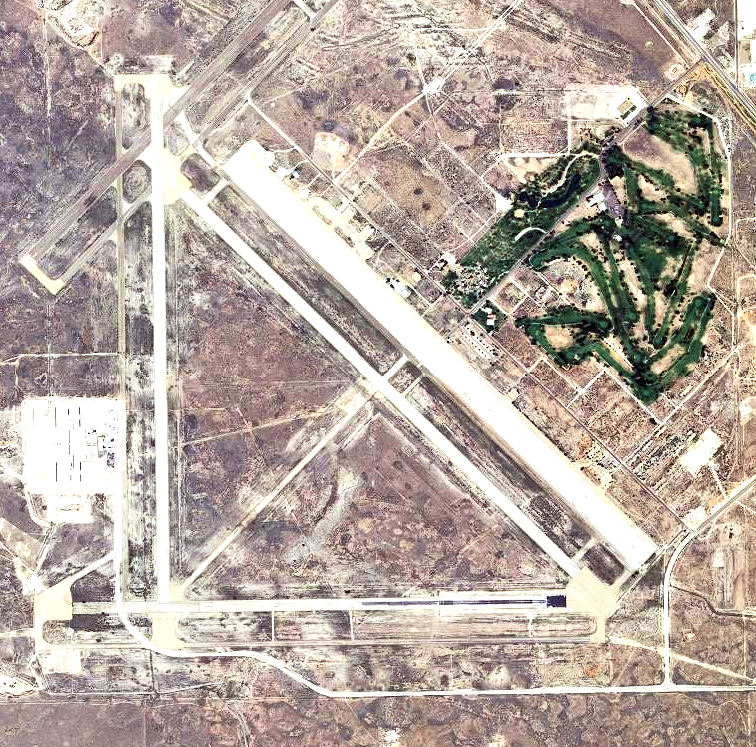
- Hobbs Industrial Airpark, 2006
- IATA: HBB; ICAO: none

Summary
- Airport type: Military
- Operator: United States Army Air Forces
- Location: Hobbs, New Mexico
- Elevation AMSL: 3,707 ft / 1,130 m
- Coordinates: 32°45′58″N 103°12′42″W

Map
- Location of Hobbs Army Airfield

Hobbs Army Airfield (IATA: HBB) was an airfield used during World War II by the United States Army Air Forces Air Training Command as part of the Western Flight Training Center. It is located in the vicinity of Hobbs, New Mexico.

== History ==
On 18 December 1941, eleven days after the Japanese attack on Pearl Harbor, Maj. John Armstrong, commander of Roswell Army Airfield, New Mexico, visited Hobbs to conduct a preliminary investigation of potential military sites and discuss the prospects with local political and business leaders. Other military representatives soon followed, including those of the Army Corps of Engineers who would be involved in construction. The Army Air Force decided to use the Hobbs location in February 1942 and began the planning of the base and shipment of materials, but a public announcement was not made until 7 April. In a lease agreement with the city of Hobbs, signed on 4 February 1942, the city was responsible for acquiring "either through voluntary purchase or condemnation" the 2,480 acres (10.0 km^{2}) required for the airfield as well as 12 to 15 acres (61,000 m^{2}) for a radio communications installation, 640 acres (2.6 km^{2}) adjacent to the airfield for an ordnance installation, land for a sewage disposal system, and land for a rail spur. The city would lease these lands to the government for $1.00 a year with a 25-year renewal option.

In April 1942 the city of Hobbs passed a $26,000 bond issue for land acquisition along the west side of the Hobbs-Lovington Highway, comprising the ranches of the Caudill and Huston families. The Huston family had spent 40 years building up their property and were not happy about being dispossessed. The city was adamant and the case was eventually settled in district court. The property had to be cleared by June 1942.

The Army Corps of Engineers, Albuquerque District, opened a sub-district office in Hobbs on 16 March 1942. On 1 April, Wilson and Company of Salina, Kansas, was awarded a $65,000 architect-engineer contract to design and build the new installation.

Construction contracts were issued to three experienced firms. "The firm of Parks, Marshall & McClosky was awarded a contract to build 423 buildings (later modified to include 456 structures) by the end of December, 1942. Hayner & Bruner had a contract to install the utilities on the base, and three Albuquerque firms partnered to form Allison, Armstrong & Thygesen, who then contracted to build the landing fields, roads, and drainage system."

Grading of the runways began on 1 June 1942 with 100 workers initially, later to expand to 3,000, to meet a mid-September deadline on the $10.8 million project. Road construction was simultaneously undertaken including the rebuilding of the Hobbs-Lovington Highway to military requirements, and the access road to the base now known as Jack Gomez Boulevard.

The first mission of Hobbs Army Airfield, as a bombardier school for the United States Army Air Forces, began with the arrival of 80 cadets and 20 instructors on 7 September 1942. This was to be the only class of bombardiers, and 69 of the original 80 cadets graduated from the program on 21 November 1942.

While the bombardiers were still training, the West Coast Training Command ordered that Hobbs Army Airfield would become a multi-engine pilot training school, making it one of three B-17 training bases in the U.S. The first B-17 Flying Fortress aircraft arrived at the base in mid-December 1942, along with the first class of 46 four-engine pilots. Hollywood actor and Air Force pilot Jimmy Stewart was among them. One hundred four-engine aircraft mechanics as well as pilot instructors arrived at the same time. The total number of cadets training as Officer Student Pilots peaked in early 1945 when there were a total of 162 B-17 aircraft at the base.

In either 1943 or 1944 Hobbs issued a booklet entitled "Hobbs Army Air Field" that is extraordinary because its last page is devoted to African-American soldiers, including a baseball team posing in their uniforms. Few publications then from bases training white soldiers ever mentioned or depicted African-American soldiers. This team calls to mind that in the movie A Soldier's Story.

The need for B-17 pilot training declined in May 1945 as the war in Europe ended. By the end of 1945 the mission of the base had changed to be one of mothballing and temporary storage of aircraft. By August 1946 a total of 1,600 airplanes had been flown to Hobbs Army Airfield for storage, including the Douglas A-26 Invader and P-51 Mustang.

Hobbs Army Airfield was decommissioned by the United States Air Force on 5 May 1948 and the land reacquired by the City of Hobbs, New Mexico later that year. By the 1960's the airport became the Hobbs Municipal Airport however commercial airline activity was operated through the Hobbs Lea County Airport a few miles south. By 1971 the airport became the Hobbs Crossroads Intercontinental Airport and by 1974 was renamed to the current Hobbs Industrial Airpark. By 1978, two of the four runways had been decommissioned and by 1990 the airport went under private ownership. In 1987 the Soaring Society of America located its headquarters at Hobbs Army Airfield, constructing a building near the old flight line and using the runway for launching gliders and holding national soaring competitions.

Today the airfield is part of the Hobbs Industrial Airpark, a non-flying light business facility. They use the base for flight races, air clubs and more. Most of the World War II Airfield is intact including the ramp, runways, and several support buildings are still standing on the former station area. Harry McAdams State Park and the Rockwind Community Links Golf Course now occupy most of the grounds.

== See also ==
- United States Army Air Forces
- New Mexico World War II Army Airfields
- 38th Flying Training Wing (World War II)
- B-17 Flying Fortress
