= Conchas Dam =

Dam on the Canadian River in San Miguel County, New Mexico, United States

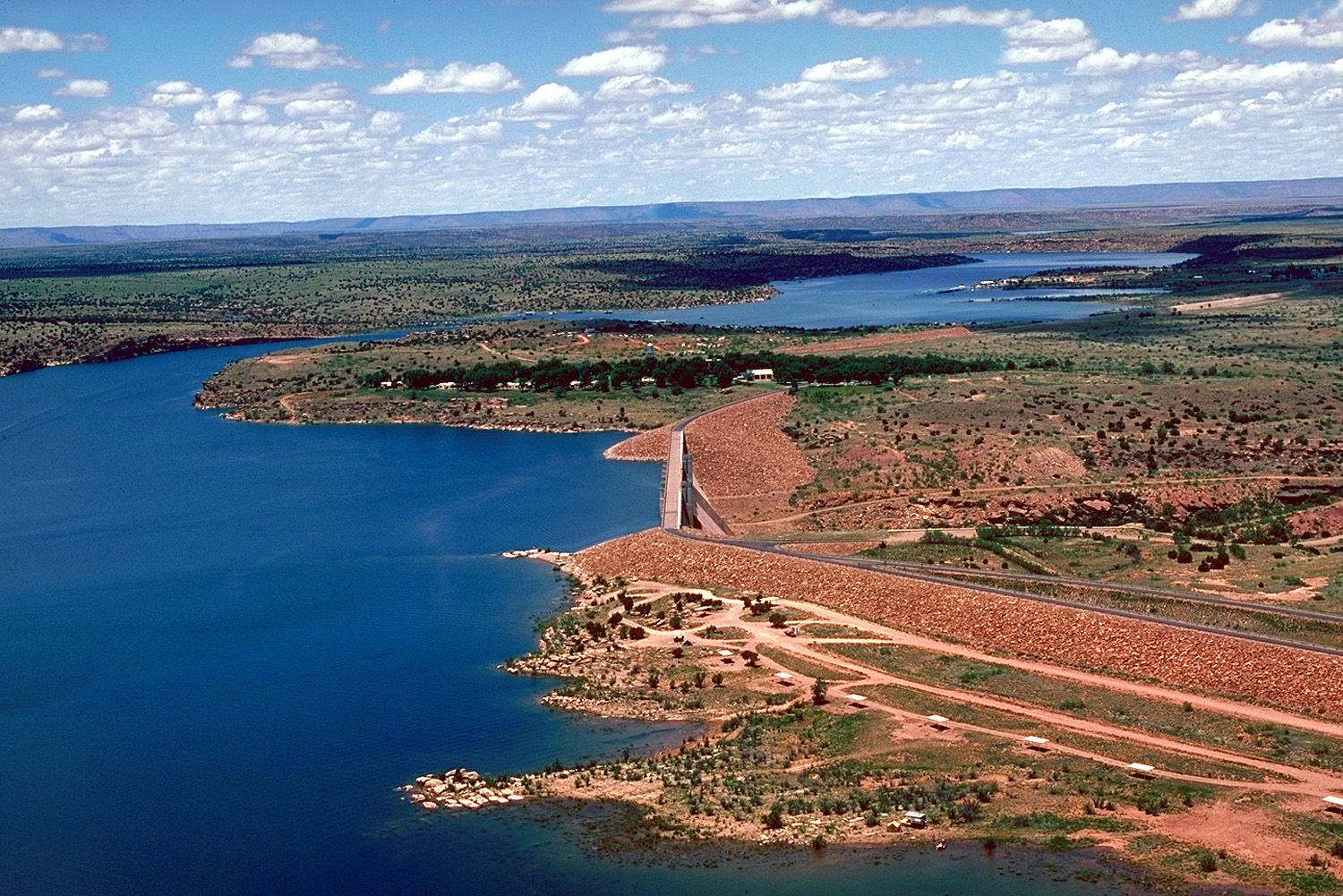
- Interactive map of Conchas Dam
- Country: United States
- Location: San Miguel County, New Mexico
- Coordinates: 35°24′11″N 104°11′26″W
- Construction began: 1935
- Opening date: 1939

Dam and spillways
- Impounds: Canadian River
- Height: 235 ft (72 m)
- Length: 19,500 ft (5,900 m)

Reservoir
- Creates: Conchas Lake
- Total capacity: 709,119 acre⋅ft (874,685 dam^{3})
- Catchment area: 7,409 mi^{2} (19,190 km^{2})
- Surface area: 16,033 acres (6,488 ha) (max)

Conchas Dam is a dam on the Canadian River in San Miguel County, New Mexico in the United States, about 50 miles (80 km) northeast of Santa Rosa. Forming Conchas Lake, it is a concrete gravity dam flanked by earthen wing dikes, standing 235 feet (72 m) high with a total length of 19,500 feet (5,900 m). The dam serves mainly for irrigation water supply and flood control and is operated by the U.S. Army Corps of Engineers.

First proposed in the early 1930s, the dam was initially rejected because of its remote site and Depression conditions in New Mexico. However, the dam was made a possibility in 1935 with the passage of the Emergency Relief Appropriation Act, which authorized several public works projects in New Mexico to provide relief to unemployment. Initial site work began in 1935 with construction on the actual dam starting in 1936. In 1939 construction was completed at a cost of $15.8 million.

Conchas Dam holds back a permanent pool of 61,532 acre-feet (75,899 dam^{3}), with a maximum flood-control capacity of 709,119 acre-feet (874,685 dam^{3}). At normal water levels the reservoir has a surface area of 2,694 acres (1,090 ha), increasing to 16,033 acres (6,488 ha) at full pool.

The dam and reservoir are the primary feature of the Tucumcari Irrigation Project. Water released from the dam is diverted into 300 miles (480 km) of canals which irrigate 41,400 acres (16,800 ha) of land in the Canadian River valley. The irrigation works were built by the U.S. Bureau of Reclamation from 1940–1942 and were turned over to the Arch Hurley Conservancy District in 1954.
