= Pacific Wings =

American commuter airline

IATA	ICAO	Call sign
LW	NMI	TSUNAMI
- Founded: 1974; 52 years ago (in Las Vegas, NV as Air Nevada Airlines Inc.)
- Ceased operations: 2014; 12 years ago
- Headquarters: Mesa, Arizona
- Key people: Greg Kahlstorf (CEO); Gabriel Kimbrell (President)

Pacific Wings Airline was an American commuter airline headquartered in Mesa, Arizona, United States in Greater Phoenix. The airline operated flights under the brands New Mexico Airlines in New Mexico, GeorgiaSkies in Georgia, TennesseeSkies in Tennessee, and KentuckySkies in Kentucky, as well as under the Pacific Wings name in Hawaii. The airline was closed in 2014.

== History ==
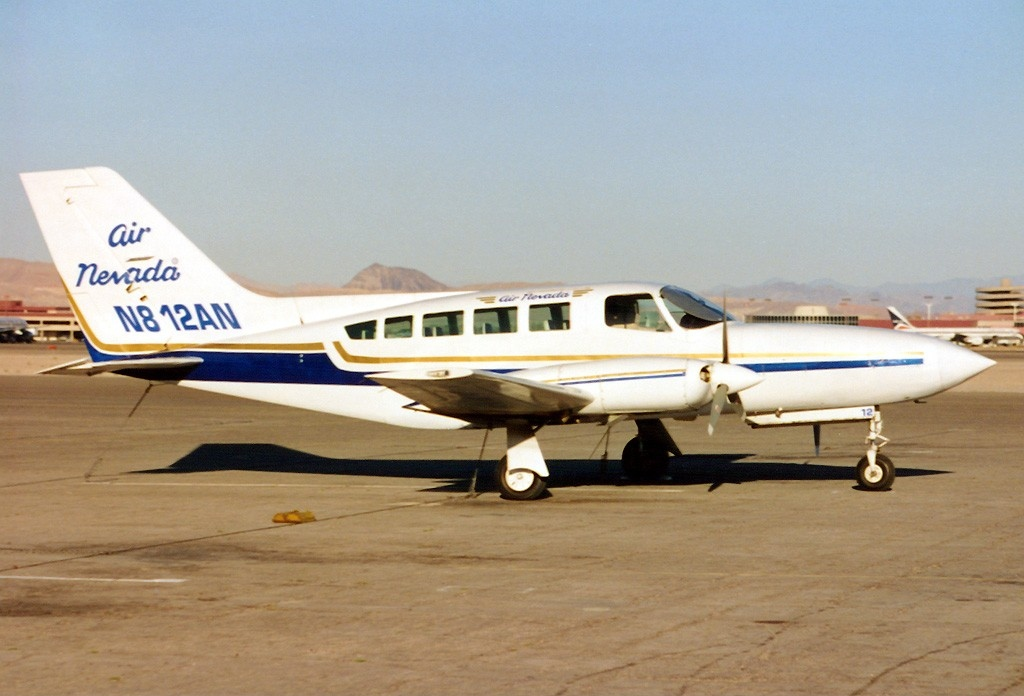
An Air Nevada Cessna 402C businessliner

The airline was established and started operations in July 1974 when it was incorporated as Air Nevada, an on-demand charter operator. Scheduled passenger services started in 1978 with the airline operating nonstop flights between Las Vegas and Grand Canyon National Park Airport with Cessna 402 twin prop aircraft. After Eagle Canyon Airlines acquired its network of tour operators, Air Nevada ceased operations in January 1998, changed its operating name to Pacific Wings and continued its scheduled services within Hawaii. It was owned by Greg Kahlstorf (50%) and Frank Ford (50%).

On February 1, 2007, the airline began operating flights between Honolulu and Molokai, Honolulu and Lanai, and Kahului and Molokai as PW Express, offering $49 one way fares on every seat on every flight. Service to Kapalua, West Maui began a month later. PW Express service terminated in July 2009 in the wake of Pacific Wings cutbacks following an incident with airport security in Kahului.

In May 2013, the airline confirmed reports that it would be ending all flights in Hawaii on June 15, 2013. By the time the reports emerged, the airline had reduced its service to Honolulu, Kahului, Kona, and Molokai; having eliminated flights Hana, Kalaupapa, and Kamuela. By 2014 the airline ceased all operations and was out of business.

== Corporate affairs ==
The airline was headquartered in Mesa, Arizona in Greater Phoenix.

The airline previously had its headquarters in Dallas, Texas. Previously the headquarters were in the Kahului Airport Commuter Terminal in Kahului Airport in Maui, Hawaii.

== Subsidiaries ==
The following airline divisions of Pacific Wings all used the same call sign of Tsunami, two letter IATA codes (LW), and ICAO 3 letter code – (NMI). As for FAA DOT regulating purposes they are all the same airline. For marketing purposes, the operations were segmented into various divisions.

=== New Mexico Airlines ===
In January 2007, the airline applied for Essential Air Service subsidies to serve Clovis and Silver City, New Mexico from Albuquerque, competing with a bid from incumbent operator Great Lakes Aviation, and to serve Hobbs and Carlsbad, New Mexico, competing with a bid from incumbent operator Air Midwest. Pacific Wings has said the airline would serve the routes with Cessna Grand Caravan aircraft, and would aim to wean the routes off subsidy service, as it has done in Hawaii. It would also serve other destinations from Albuquerque without a subsidy.

In March 2007, both the Lea County Commission (which oversees the airport in Hobbs) and the Carlsbad City Council voted unanimously to support Pacific Wings' bid to replace Mesa's EAS contract to both airports. In addition to subsidized service to Albuquerque and El Paso, Texas, the airline has also proposed unsubsidized service to Lubbock and Midland-Odessa, Texas and Santa Fe, New Mexico. It was also reported that the airline had withdrawn its bid for service to Silver City after local officials declined to meet with airline representatives. The United States Department of Transportation issued an order selecting Pacific Wings for the Hobbs and Carlsbad service on March 30, 2007. Flights in New Mexico began on July 1, 2007, under the name New Mexico Airlines. The airline had all of its aircraft grounded by the FAA in December 2014 and was able to reinstate some service in early 2015 but completely shut down by May, 2015.

=== GeorgiaSkies ===
In June 2008, Pacific Wings was awarded an EAS contract for service to Athens Benn Epps Airport, Georgia and Middle Georgia Regional Airport in Macon, Georgia. The airline began operating flights from Hartsfield-Jackson Atlanta International Airport in Atlanta under the name GeorgiaSkies using Cessna Grand Caravan aircraft on September 29, 2008. However, as of January 2013, GeorgeSkies reportedly no longer flies between Macon and Atlanta, although GeorgiaSkies has a press release stating that "GeorgiaSkies has been ordered to continue serving the City until a replacement carrier can be found." For a brief period Macon was without air service as the replacement carrier Sun Air International was unable to begin operations on the slated date. Eventually, Silver Airways began EAS service to Macon.

=== TennesseeSkies/KentuckySkies ===
In mid-2009 Pacific Wings was awarded a contract to provide EAS service from Jackson, Tennessee and Owensboro, Kentucky. Marketed as TennesseeSkies in Jackson and KentuckySkies in Owensboro, flights from both cities would be offered to Nashville, Tennessee with some flights continuing to Atlanta, Georgia. Service began on August 30, 2009. On June 30, 2011, Pacific Wings filed with the United States Department of Transportation a 90-day notice of its intent to terminate service effective September 30, 2011 saying it is “unable to procure counter or gate space at Nashville International Airport on reasonable terms.” The DOT prohibited the airline from suspending service until a replacement carrier began service. Eventually replacement carriers were procured (Cape Air in Owensboro and SeaPort Airlines in Jackson) and TennesseeSkies/KentuckySkies ceased operation in early 2012.

=== St. Louis, Missouri operation ===
For the year 2013, Pacific Wings had received the EAS contract to serve Burlington, Iowa, Decatur, Illinois, and Jonesboro, Arkansas from St. Louis, Missouri replacing Air Choice One.

== Incidents and Accidents ==
On July 12, 1993, when the airline was still known as Air Nevada, a Cessna 402C with registration N818AN crashed after takeoff from McCarran International Airport in Las Vegas, Nevada. The flight was destined for the Grand Canyon, but after liftoff the pilot advised the air traffic controller that the baggage door was open and requested to return to the airport for landing. The pilot and both passengers on board were killed. The National Transportation Safety Board determined the probable cause of the accident to be the pilot's failure to maintain adequate airspeed while maneuvering in the traffic pattern, with the pilot's failure to assure that the nose baggage compartment door was secured as an additional factor.

== Incidents with Airport Security ==
After several videotaped incidents in 2005, Pacific Wings accused the security firm Wackenhut of harassment.

The first known recorded incident reported in the media happened in October 2005, after the President of the airline and one of his employees were attacked by Wackenhut Security Manager "Butch" Tam Ho in an airport conference room during a meeting in which Pacific Wings requested to bring repeated incidents of harassment by Wackenhut personnel to the attention of airport management. The airline President and his employee were then placed under citizen's arrest by Wackenhut personnel and held for hours without being Mirandized or allowed access to a telephone. The airline executive was knocked unconscious during the event, and his employee suffered a facial fracture. Neither the Pacific Wings President nor the employee were ever charged by prosecutors with any crime, and both arrest records were expunged six months after the incident. Tam Ho was indicted on two counts of witness tampering by a federal Grand Jury in May 2008. The case went to trial in early 2009, and on October 16, 2009, Tam Ho was found not guilty on all counts due to a legal technicality involving whether Tam Ho's admitted assault was done under color of law.

On November 14, 2005, another employee was accosted by another Wackenhut Security Guard while unloading supplies at the same airport. The employee videotaped the entire incident. On the videotape clip repeatedly broadcast in local media, the guard is shown threatening to kill the employee with a sidearm, shoving and cursing at the employee, and spitting on the employee. The guard, Eric Brown, was arrested by Maui Police and charged with terroristic threatening. Brown was later banned from working on any state property or facility.

On July 8, 2009, Pacific Wings temporarily suspended its Hawaii operations a day after an alleged confrontation between airline employees and Securitas airport police attempting to deliver a citation to Gabe Kimbrell, the airline's president and chief operations officer, in connection with a fuel spill and alleged improper storage of fuel in the airline's Kahului hangar the previous month. The airline resumed flights two days later, announcing that it was reducing service to just three routes, eliminating service to Kona and increasing ticket prices.

== Fleet ==
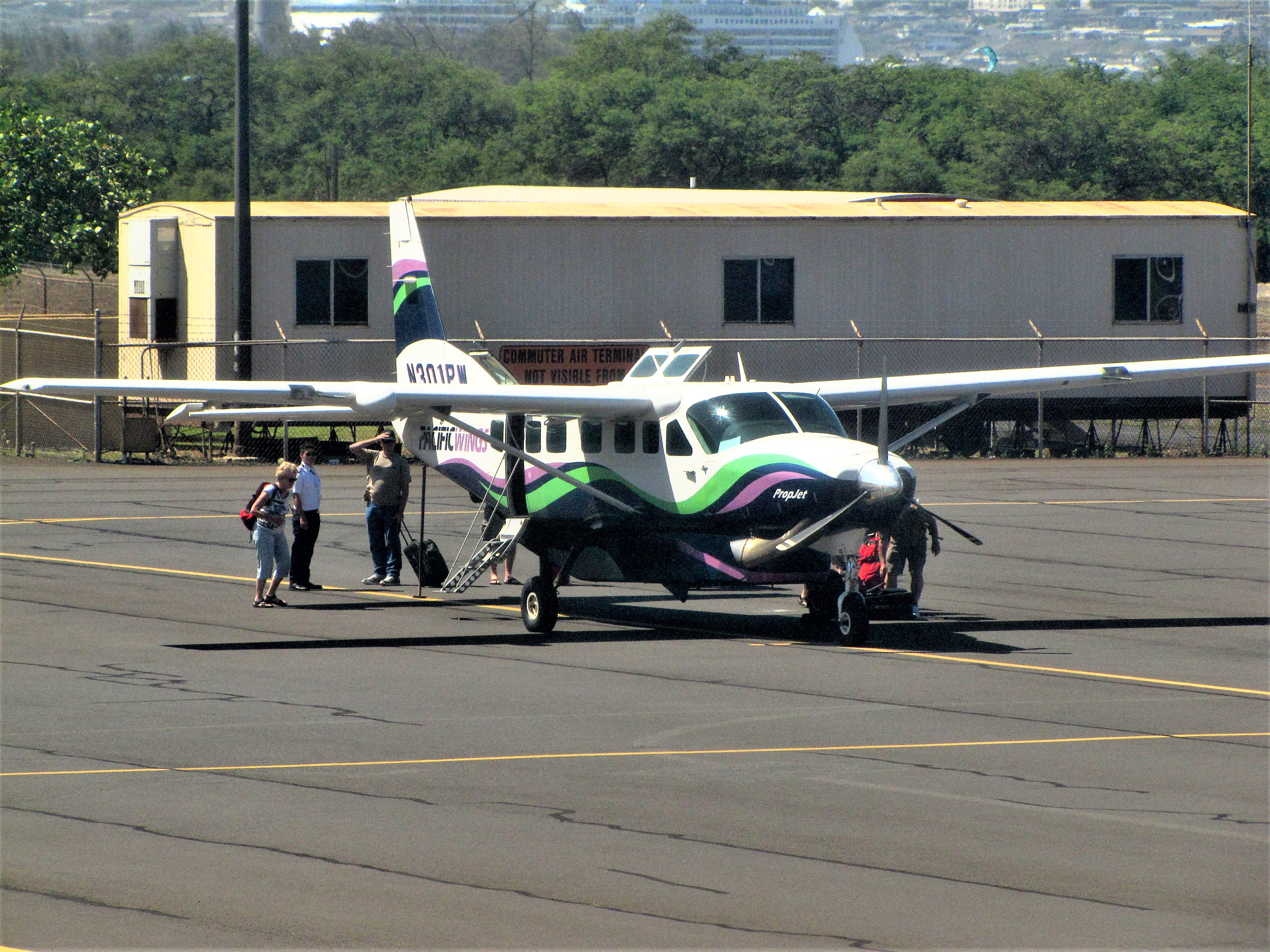
Pacific Wings Cessna 208B Grand Caravan at Kahului Airport in 2012

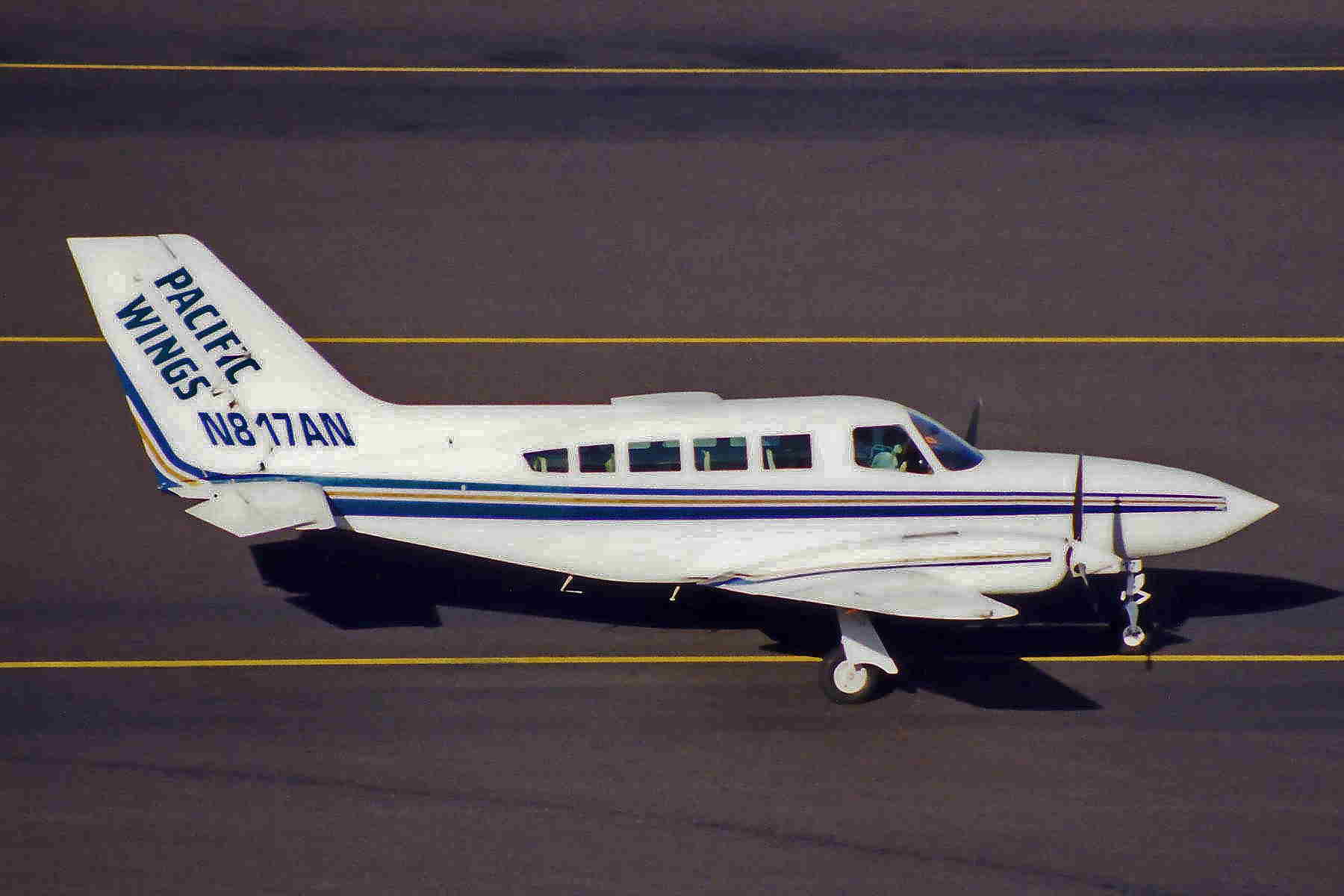
Pacific Wings N817AN Cessna 402C Pacific Wings Honolulu International Airport 15 JAN 99.

The Pacific Wings fleet was composed of single engine Cessna 208B Grand Caravan aircraft. Prior to the acquisition of the Cessna 208, the airline operated a fleet of twin engine Cessna 402 aircraft.

== See also ==
- List of defunct airlines of the United States
