= Deming Municipal Airport =

Airport in Luna County, New Mexico

Deming Municipal Airport Deming Army Airfield
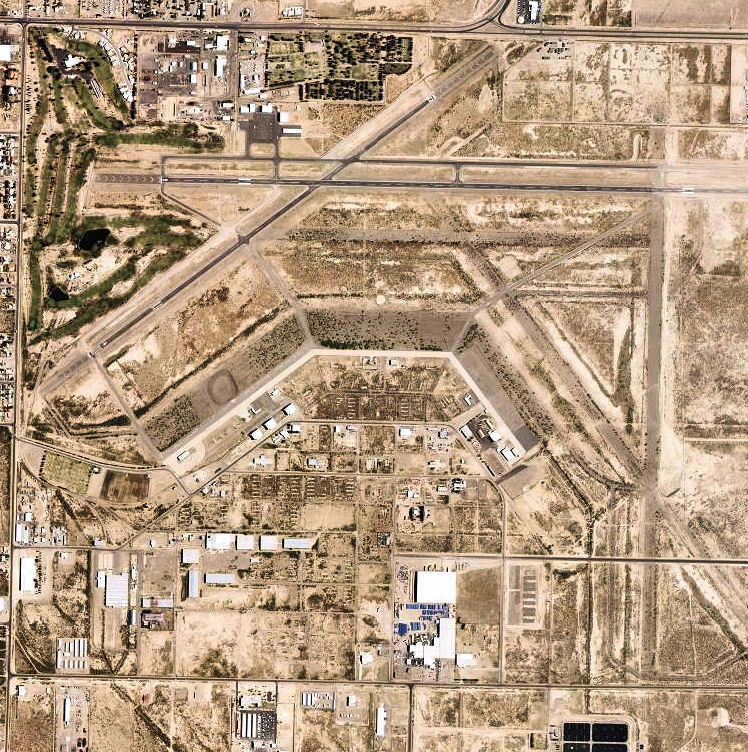
- 2006 USGS orthophoto
- IATA: DMN; ICAO: KDMN; FAA LID: DMN

Summary
- Airport type: Public
- Owner: City of Deming
- Serves: Deming, New Mexico
- Elevation AMSL: 4,314 ft (1,315 m)
- Coordinates: 32°15′44″N 107°43′14″W

Map
- Location within New Mexico

Runways
Direction	Length		Surface
Direction	ft	m	Surface
8/26	6,627	2,020	Asphalt
4/22	5,675	1,730	Asphalt

Statistics (2008)
- Aircraft operations: 28,655
- Based aircraft: 17
- Source: Federal Aviation Administration

Deming Army Airfield 1943 classbook

Deming Municipal Airport (IATA: DMN, ICAO: KDMN, FAA LID: DMN) is two miles southeast of Deming, in Luna County, New Mexico, United States.

== Facilities ==
The airport covers 2,870 acres (1,160 ha) at an elevation of 4,314 feet (1,315 m). It has two asphalt runways: 8/26 is 6,627 by 75 feet (2,020 x 23 m) and 4/22 is 5,675 by 60 feet (1,730 x 18 m).

In the year ending April 13, 2008 the airport had 28,655 aircraft operations, average 78 per day: 65% general aviation, 32% military and 3% air taxi. 17 aircraft were then based at this airport: 94% single-engine and 6% multi-engine.

== World War II ==
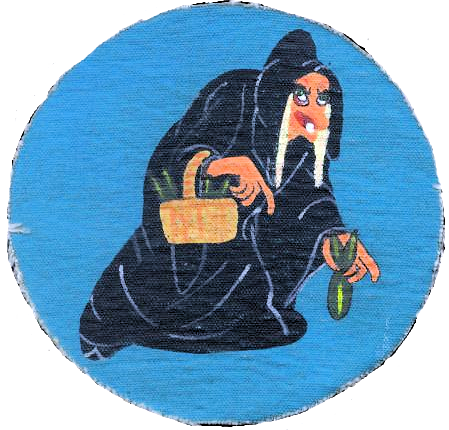
AAF Bombardier School patch, 1943

The airfield was activated on 15 November 1942. It conducted bombardier training for USAAF Gulf Coast Training Center (later Central Flying Command). The first class of bombardiers graduated on 6 March. In the next three years an estimated 12,000 cadets passed through the Deming school. The bombardier trainer used was the Beech AT-11 Kansan.

The airfield was assigned to Second Air Force 16th Bombardment Training Wing on 31 December 1944. It conducted B-29 Superfortress group bombardment training until the end of World War II, when the training program at Deming wound down and was inactivated 18 December 1945. The airfield was closed on 31 January 1946. It was eventually discharged to the War Assets Administration (WAA) and sold.

== Past airline service ==
Frontier Airlines (1950-1986) DC-3s served Deming starting in July, 1950, flying El Paso to Phoenix via Las Cruces, Deming, and Lordsburg, New Mexico as well as Clifton, Safford, and Tucson, Arizona. The service ended in April, 1953.

== See also ==
- New Mexico World War II Army Airfields
- 38th Flying Training Wing (World War II)
