= New Mexico World War II Army Airfields =

New Mexico World War II Army Airfields
- Part of World War II

Site information
- Type: Army Airfields

Location
- Map Of New Mexico World War II Army Airfields

Site history
- Built: 1940-1944
- In use: 1940-present

During World War II, the United States Army Air Forces (USAAF) established numerous airfields in New Mexico for training pilots and aircrews of USAAF fighters and bombers.

Most of these airfields were under the command of Fourth Air Force or the Army Air Forces Training Command (AAFTC). However the other USAAF support commands (Air Technical Service Command (ATSC); Air Transport Command (ATC) or Troop Carrier Command) commanded a significant number of airfields in a support roles.

It is still possible to find remnants of these wartime airfields. Many were converted into municipal airports, some were returned to agriculture and several were retained as United States Air Force installations and were front-line bases during the Cold War. Hundreds of the temporary buildings that were used survive today, and are being used for other purposes.

== Major Airfields ==
Second Air Force

- Alamogordo AAF, Alamogordo

Now: Holloman Air Force Base

- Clovis AAF, Clovis

Now: Cannon Air Force Base

- Kirtland Field, Albuquerque

Now: Albuquerque International Sunport and Kirtland Air Force Base

Air Technical Service Command

- Albuquerque Army Airfield, Albuquerque, New Mexico (merged into Kirtland Field in 1944)

Army Air Forces Training Command

- Carlsbad AAF, Carlsbad

Now: Cavern City Air Terminal (IATA: CNM, ICAO: KCNM, FAA LID: CNM)

- Deming AAF, Deming (reassigned to Second Air Force in 1944)

Now: Deming Municipal Airport (IATA: DMN, ICAO: KDMN)

- Fort Sumner AAF, Fort Sumner

Now: Fort Sumner Municipal Airport (IATA: FSU, ICAO: KFSU)

- Hobbs AAF, Hobbs

Was: Hobbs Army Airfield (1942-1948)
Now: Hobbs Industrial Air Park

- Roswell AAF, Roswell

Was: Walker Air Force Base (1947-1967)
Now: Roswell International Air Center (RIAC) (IATA: ROW, ICAO: KROW, FAA LID: ROW)
