= Army Air Forces Western Flying Training Command =

Western Flying Training Command
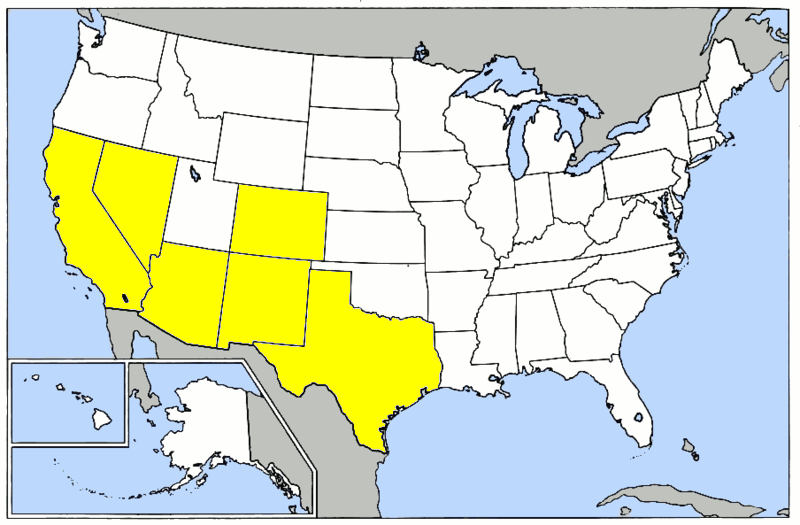
- Locations of airfields controlled by the Western Flying Training Command
- Active: 1940–1946
- Country: United States
- Branch: United States Army Air Forces
- Type: Command and Control
- Role: Training
- Part of: Army Air Forces Training Command
- Engagements: World War II: World War II American Theater

Commanders
- Notable commanders: Major General Ralph P. Cousins

Insignia
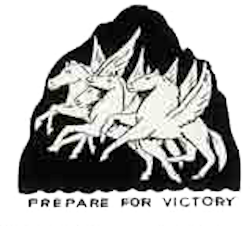
- Western Flying Training Comman emblem

The Army Air Forces Western Flying Training Command (WFTC) was a command of the United States Army Air Forces. It was assigned to the Army Air Forces Training Command, stationed at Santa Ana Army Air Base, California. It was inactivated on 1 November 1945.

== History ==
The West Coast Air Corps Training Center was established on 8 July 1940 by the Office of the Chief of Air Corps as part of the expansion of the training department of the Air Corps. After the Fall of France in May 1940, the United States began rapidly expanding its military forces, and with the large numbers of men entering the military, the training requirements of the Air Corps were drastically expanded.

As a result, the centralized training of aircrew was divided into three Training Centers, the Eastern, Gulf Coast (later Central) and Western. Training schools were assigned to the Centers based on the geography of the United States. In July 1943, these Centers were re-designated as Eastern, Central and Western Training Commands.

By 1944, WFTC controlled a large number of training schools in the Southwestern United States, and established several Wings to provide organizational command and control over them, based on both training types and geography. The schools operated by WFTC part of the Aviation Cadet Training Program. These were:

- Classification: This was the stage where it would be decided whether the cadet would train as a navigator, bombardier, or pilot
- Preflight: Ground training for all air cadets. Successful completion meant being assigned to a flying school for training. "Washouts" were returned to the regular Air Corps ranks for reassignment.
- Primary (Phase I): Taught basic flying using two-seater training aircraft. Usually taught by contract flying schools operated by the WFTC
- Basic (Phase II): Formation flying, air navigation, cross-country flying skills were taught.
- Advanced (Phase II): Single or multi-engine aircraft schools for cadets becoming fighter, bomber or transport pilots. After graduation, the successful Air Cadet received his "wings" and were commissioned Second Lieutenants. In addition, experienced pilots in the field were sent to Training Command "transition schools" to acquire additional single or mulch-engine flying ratings.

In addition to the American Air Cadets, Cadets from the British Royal Air Force and Free French Air Force were trained in flying skills. WFTC also operated aircrew schools for Navigators, Bombardiers and flexible aerial gunners. Radio operators were centrally trained at Scott Field, Illinois. Other aircrew positions, such as B-29 flight engineers and RADAR operators were also trained later in the war as training requirements presented themselves. This included the first jet pilots in 1945.

WFTC was inactivated on 1 November 1945, being consolidated into the new Central Flying Training Command at Randolph Field, Texas, as part of the consolidation of the Army Air Forces after World War II ended.

Shortly after the end of World War II on 15 December 1945, Central Flying Training Command consolidated with Western Flying Training Command on 1 November 1945, and was re-designated Western Flying Training Command. This reflected the massive demobilization after the end of the war, and the closure of the majority of the wartime training bases. On 15 December 1945 Western Flying Training Command consolidated with the Eastern Flying Training Command. The single entity became Army Air Forces Flying Training Command on 1 January 1946, with its headquarters at Randolph Field, Texas.

== Lineage ==
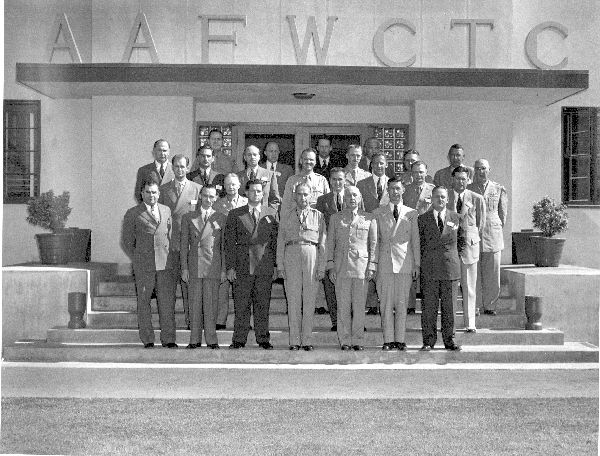
Officers and officials in front of the AAFWCTC Building c. 1942

- Established as West Coast Air Corps Training Center on 8 July 1940 and activated

Redesignated Army Air Forces West Coast Training Center on 29 October 1942
Redesignated Army Air Forces Western Flying Training Command on 31 July 1943
Inactivated on 1 November 1945

=== Assignments ===
- Office of the Chief of Air Corps, 8 July 1940
- Air Corps Flying Training Command (later Army Air Forces Flying Training Command, Army Air Forces Training Command), 23 January 1942 – 1 November 1945

=== Stations ===
- Moffett Field, California, 8 July 1940
- Santa Ana Army Air Base, California, 1 April 1942 – 1 November 1945

== Major Components ==
- 35th Flying Training Wing Basic/Advanced Flight Training (California)

Headquarters:

Merced Army Airfield, California, 8 January 1943
Minter Field, California, 11 September 1943 – 16 Jun 1946

- 36th Flying Training Wing Primary Flight Training

Headquarters:

Victorville Army Airfield, California, 8 January 1943
Santa Ana Army Air Base, California, 21 December 1943– 1 November 1945

- 37th Flying Training Wing Basic/Advanced Flight Training (Arizona)

Headquarters:

Luke Field, Arizona, 8 January 1943 – 16 June 1946

- 38th Flying Training Wing Bombardier and Specialized 2/4-Engine Training

Headquarters:

Roswell Army Airfield, New Mexico, 8 January 1943
Kirtland Field, New Mexico, 10 September 1943
Williams Field, Arizona, 26 February 1945 – 16 June 1946

- 80th Flying Training Wing

Headquarters:

Las Vegas Army Airfield, Nevada, 25 August 1943 – 16 June 1946
(No units ever assigned)

- 81st Flying Training Wing Classification/Preflight Unit

Headquarters:

Santa Ana Army Air Base, California, 25 August 1943
1104 W. 8th St., Santa Ana, California, 15 December 1944 – 1 November 1945

- 83d Flying Training Wing

Headquarters:

Douglas Army Airfield, Arizona, 25 August 1943 – 20 December 1943
(No units ever assigned)

== Major Aircraft ==
Primary flight training

Boeing-Stearman PT-17, Fairchild PT-19 and Ryan PT-22 twin-seat, single engine trainers

Basic flight training

Vultee BT-13 and Vultee BT-15

Advanced flight training

North American AT-6 (single engine); Cessna AT-17 (two-engine)

Specialized schools:

Curtiss-Wright AT-9s were used for high performance two-engine training in perpetration for Lockheed P-38 Lightning training
Beechcraft AT-10s were used for pilots in training for two engine bombers (B-25s and B-26s)
Beechcraft AT-11s were used for pilots in training for C-47 transports along with bombardier training
Beechcraft AT-7s were used for two-engine pilot training and also navigator training
Boeing B-17s and Consolidated B-24s were used for four-engine pilot training
L-2, L-3, L-4, TG-5 and TG-6s were used for glider and liaison pilot training
Gunnery training schools flew A-33, AT-6s, AT-1s, B-34s, B-10s and RP-63s for air-to-air flexible gunnery training.
