= GLE =

GLE may refer to:

- Gainesville station (Texas), an Amtrak station
- Gainesville Municipal Airport, in Texas, United States
- .gle top-level Google abbreviation domain
- Gleneagles railway station, in Scotland
- Irish language (ISO 639-2 code gle)
- Graphics Layout Engine, a computer programming language
- Mercedes-Benz GLE-Class, a model of sport utility vehicle
- Gold-leaf electroscope, a scientific instrument developed in 1787 by British clergyman and physicist Abraham Bennet
- Ground level enhancement, a type of Solar particle event.
