= Midland Army Airfield =

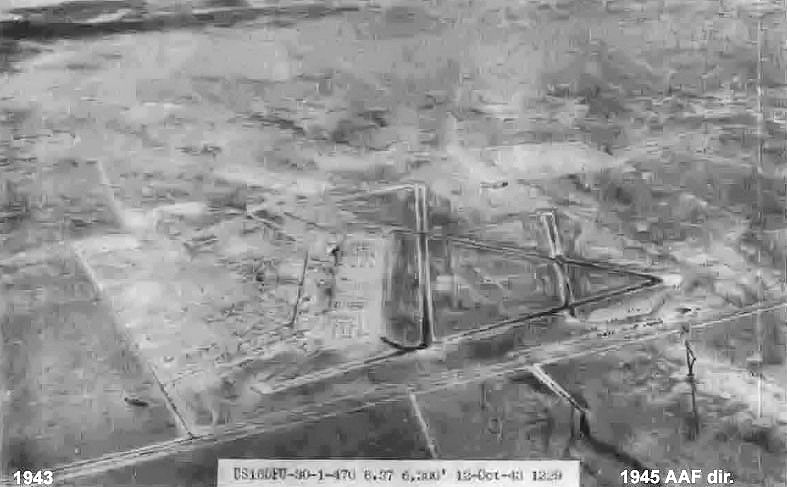
- Midland Army Airfield, Texas, 13 October 1943
- IATA: none; ICAO: none

Summary
- Location: Midland, Texas
- Built: 1942
- In use: 1942-1945
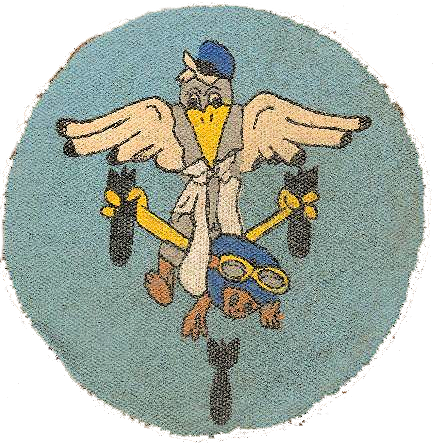
- Occupants: Midland AAF Bombardier training school
- Coordinates: 31°56′36″N 102°12′19″W

Map
- Midland Army Airfield, Texas

Runways
Direction	Length		Surface
Direction	ft	m	Surface
00R/18L	6,500	1,981	Asphalt
00L/18R	4,243	1,293	Asphalt
05/23	6,500	1,981	Asphalt
14/32	6,500	1,981	Asphalt
- Texas World War II Airfield database

Midland Army Airfield is a former World War II military airfield, located 8.4 miles west-southwest of Midland, Texas. It operated as a Bombardier training school for the United States Army Air Forces from 1942 until 1945.

== History ==
=== Origins ===
Midland Army Air Field was a World War II United States Army Air Forces bombardier-training base on U.S. Highway 80 halfway between Midland and Odessa in Midland County.

It was originally named Sloan Field for Samuel Addison Sloan, who leased 240 acres of pastureland from Clarence Scharbauer, a rancher in October 1927 to establish a privately owned landing field and flying school. Sloan was killed in a plane crash on 1 January 1929, and the operation was continued by his brother and sister. Sloan Field was designated an Army Airways Station in May 1930. In 1939 Harvey Sloan sold the Field to the City of Midland for $14,500.

Prominent businessmen in Midland could foresee the possibility of a military base in West Texas. In 1940, after Hitler struck Poland, they started promoting the airport for use as a training base to the military establishment in Washington. Work was done by the WPA with more runway and taxiway improvements, as well as airfield lighting. A visit by Brigadier General G.C. Brant, Commander of the Gulf Coast Air Corps Training Center at Randolph Field was made and he reported that the situation at Midland was very favorable. It was on Friday, 13 June 1941, that it was announced that Midland would get the air school. On 1 July 1941, the municipal airport was leased to the United States government for a dollar a year, and construction began on 17 July.

Immediate search for ranch land to be used as target ranges was instigated and plans for "an advanced twin-engine flying and bombardment school" had begun. Ground was broken on 15 July 1941 with the leasing of 1,030 acres of land for the duration of the war plus six months. Twenty-three bomb ranges were mapped out - located within a 50-mile radius of the base.

One of the first structures to go up was the 500,000 gallon water tank which is still in use. Buildings for Headquarters, officer, enlisted and cadet barracks, a station hospital, classrooms, mess hall and flight line were all being erected by civilian employees. By the time the first enlisted man arrived in October 1941, he found that 105 buildings were partially completed with the remaining 99 waiting to be started. In November 1941, officers and enlisted men started arriving for duty.

It was announced that training of cadets would begin in January 1942. With the bombing of Pearl Harbor on 7 December 1941, the need for bombardiers was evident, soon after an announcement was made by Lieutenant Colonel Isaiah Davies, Commanding Officer of Midland Army Air Field (MAAF), that the school would be used exclusively to train bombardiers.

=== Operations ===
Midland Army Air Field 1942 classbook

On 26 September 1942, the base was formally re-designated Midland Army Air Field, and the school was named the Army Air Forces Bombardier School, one of a dozen bombardier-training schools. It was one of the "West Texas Bombardier Quadrangle" schools of the Army Air Forces Training Command. The other bases in the quad were Childress Army Airfield, San Angelo Army Airfield and Big Spring Army Airfield. The sole purpose of the Bombardier College was to train young men to use the bombsight invented by Carl Norden.

The first group of cadets, Class 42–6, arrived for training from Ellington, Texas, on 6 February 1942. Midland reached a peak base population of more than 4,000 and graduated a total of 6,627 bombardier officers before all training ceased on 1 January 1946.

Cadets remained at Midland exactly twelve weeks for combined ground and flight training, rigorous physical activity and rigid military discipline during a sixteen-hour day, with only part of Sunday off. They learned to hit targets with remarkable accuracy, dropping at least 200 practice bombs each from the AT-11 airplane—and learned to handle the complex Norden sight with considerable skill. The first class consisted of 103 cadets and graduated on 30 April 1942. Students from the Netherlands, East Indies, France, Brazil and China were trained at MAF.

In August 1943 the AAF Central Bombardier Instructor School was transferred from Carlsbad Army Airfield, New Mexico, to Midland. The base pioneered the use of the highly secret Norden bombsight and at one time operated twenty-three bombing ranges across West Texas. Personnel from Midland AAF were instrumental in developing photographic and sonic methods of scoring bomb hits and analyzing bombing proficiency.

1942-1945 Midland Army Airfield photos

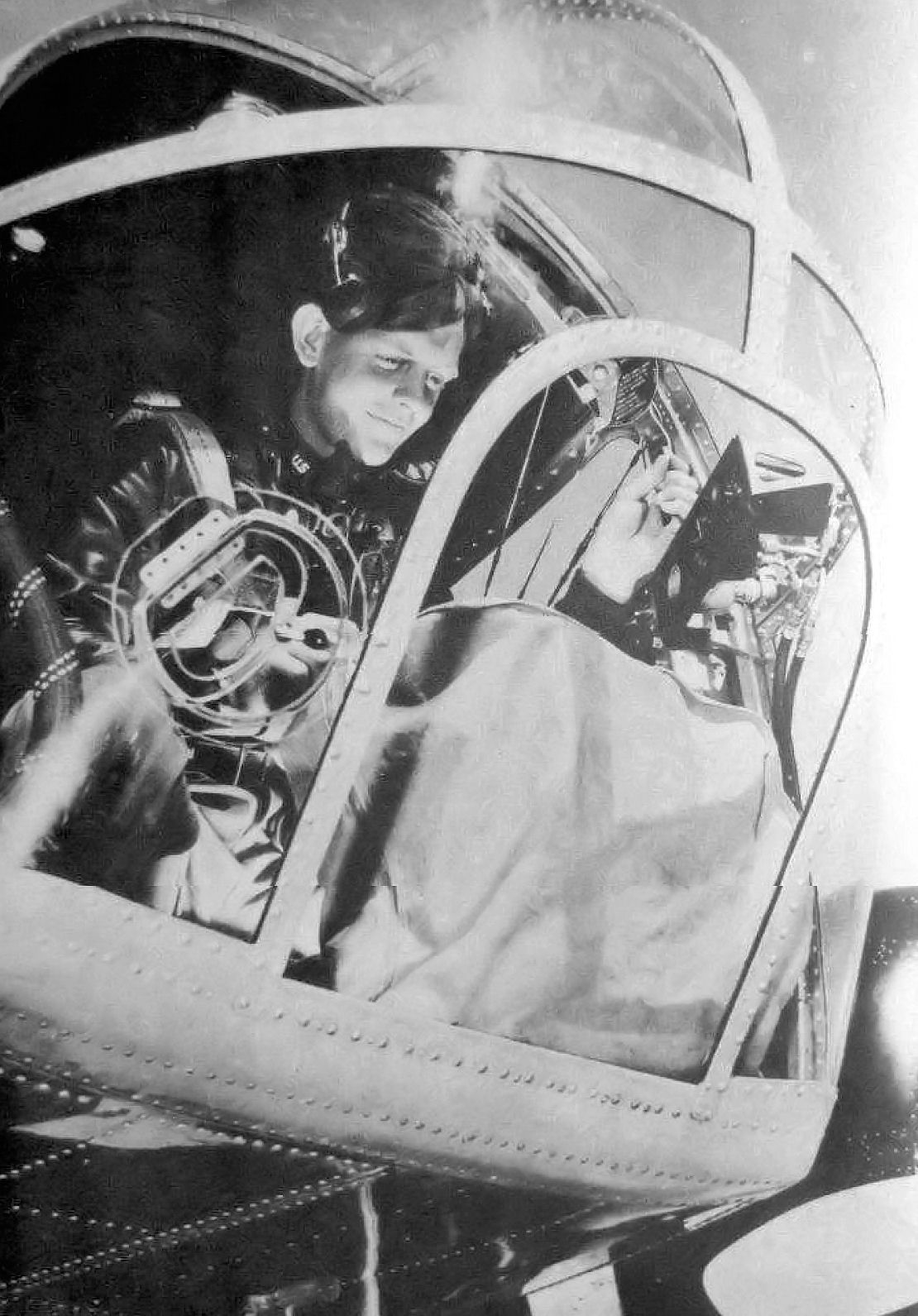
AT-11 training bomb drop on practice target

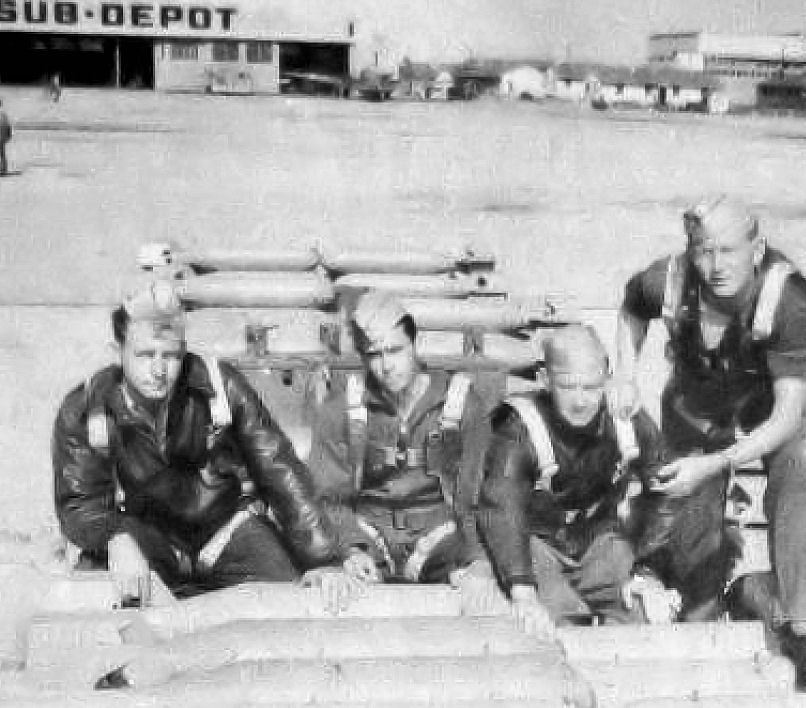
Loading concrete training bombs on aircraft

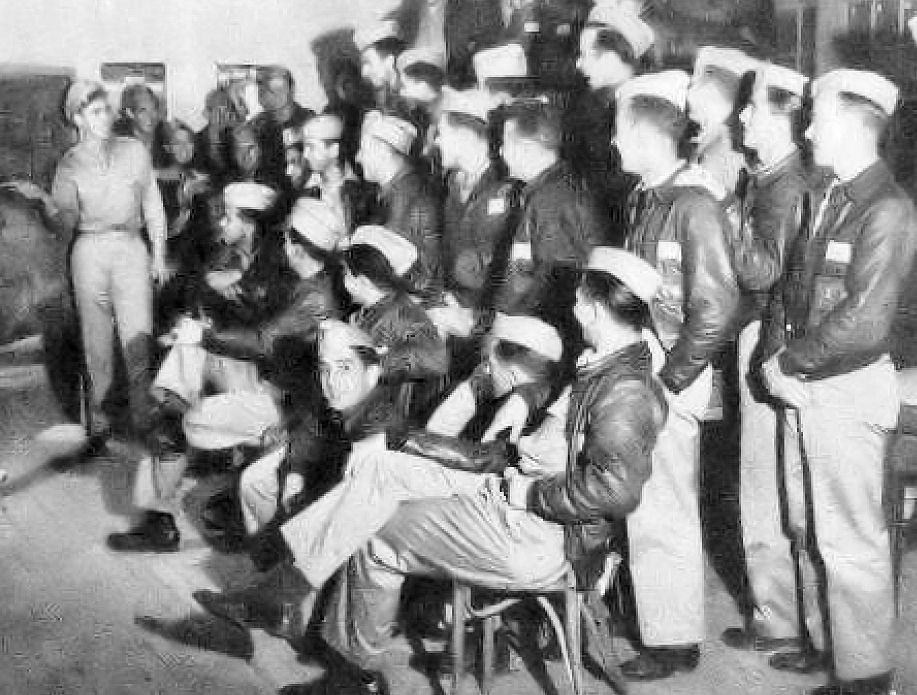
Mission briefing prior to training flight

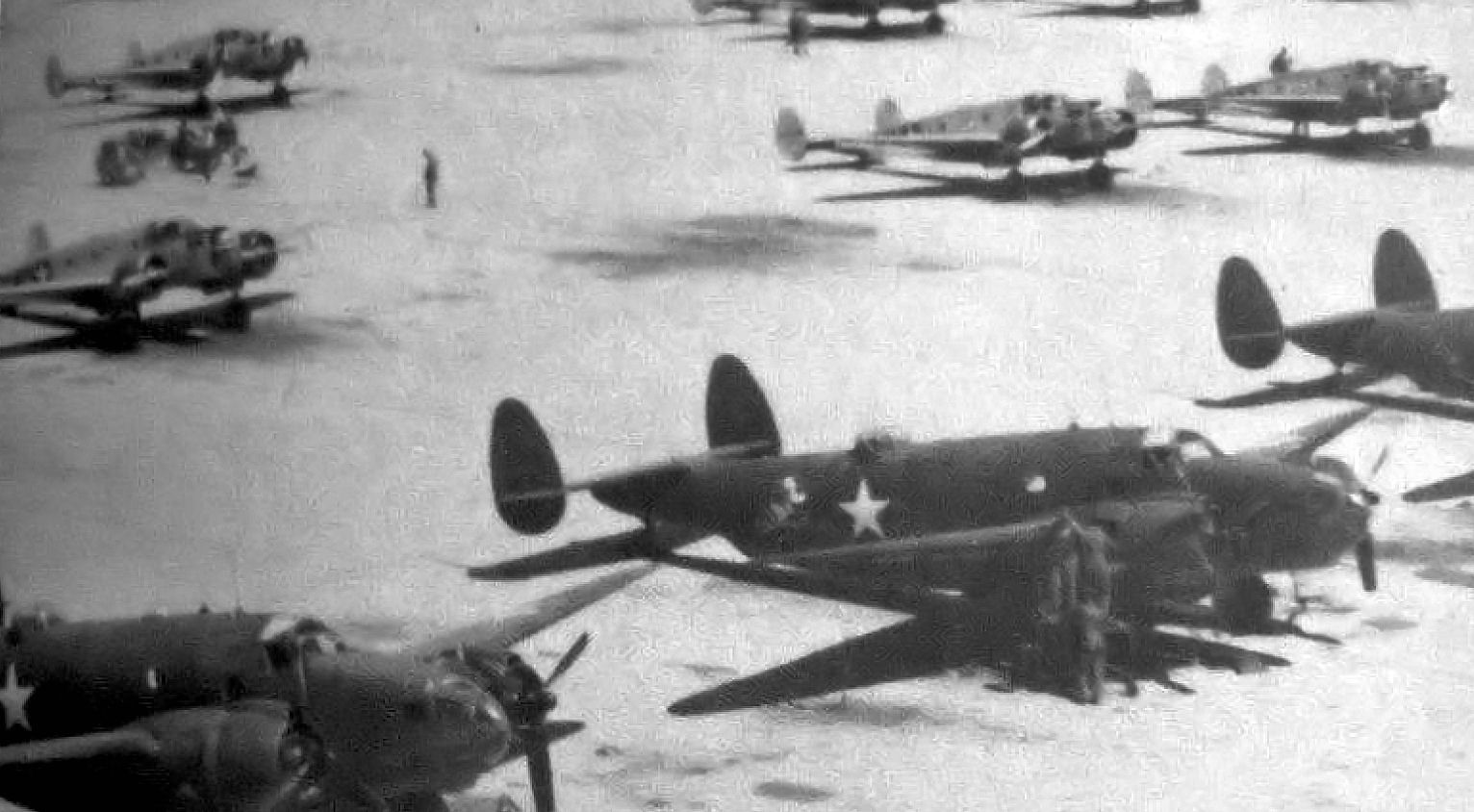
B-34 Lexingtons and AT-11 Kansans on flightline

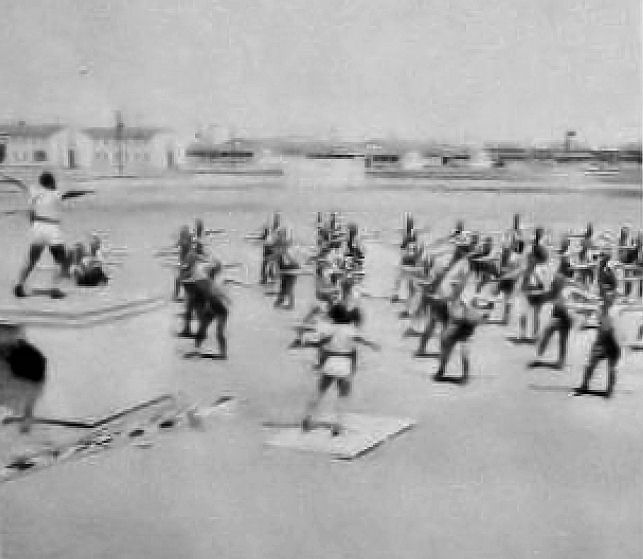
Cadet Physical Training

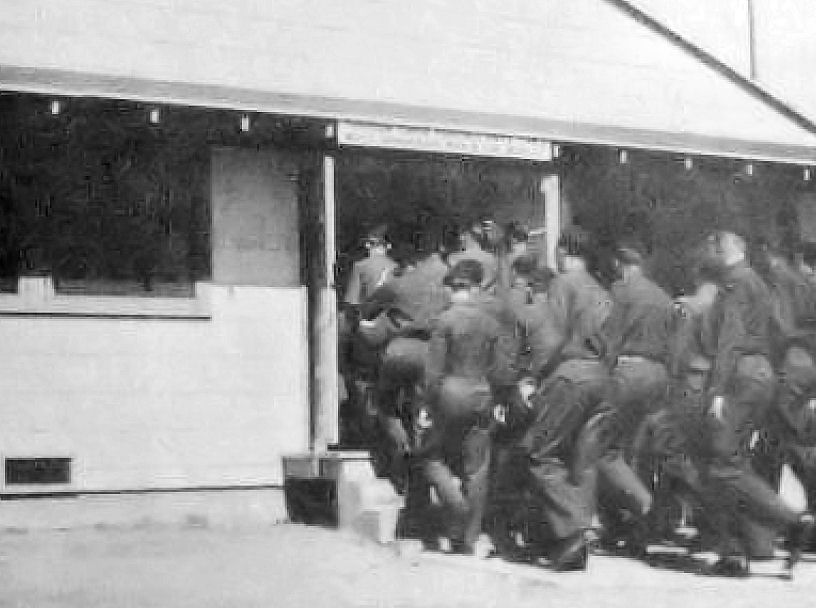
Cadets entering dining hall

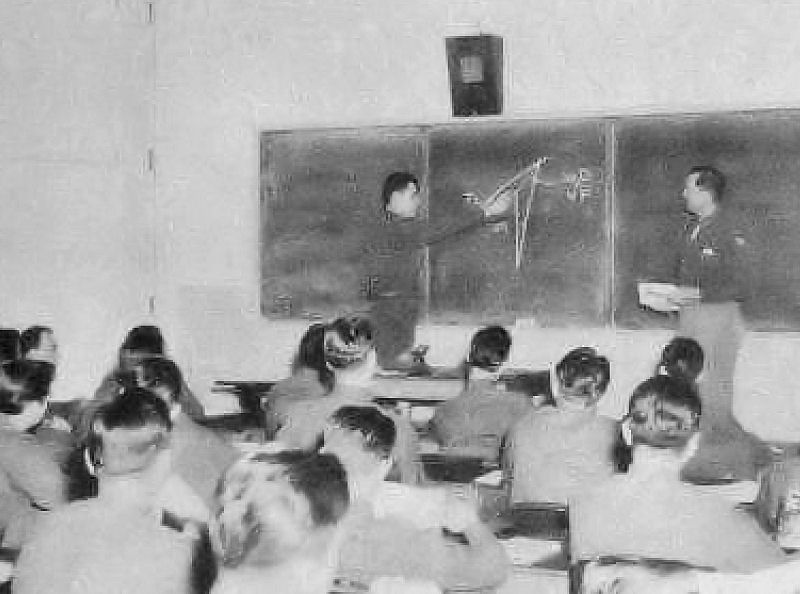
Classroom ground instruction lecture

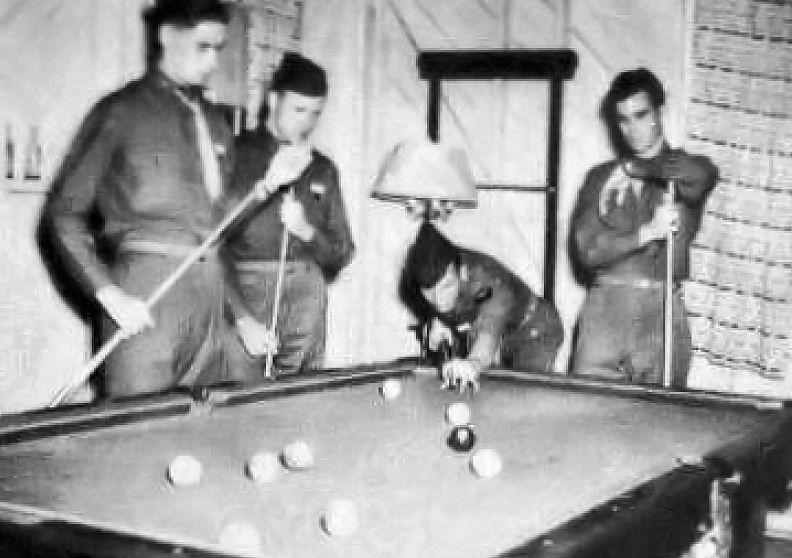
Pool table in cadet barracks dayroom

=== Closure ===
The air field was deactivated as a military installation on 15 June 1946, and returned to the city of Midland on 1 July 1947. Since that date, it has been improved and modernized and has become an increasingly busy commercial air terminal and transportation-distribution center.

== See also ==
- 34th Flying Training Wing (World War II)
- Bombardier (film), a 1943 fictional war drama about the training program for bombardiers of the United States Army Air Forces.
- Texas World War II Army Airfields
