= DRW =

DRW is a three-character combination which could mean:

- DRW Trading Group, a proprietary electronic trading firm based in Chicago.
- Dan Ryan Woods, a forest preserve in Cook County, Illinois
- Detroit Red Wings, a National Hockey League team.
- Deutsches Rechtswörterbuch
- IATA airport code for Darwin International Airport
- A type of filename extension (Drawn File.)
- Shorthand for Doctor Who, a British science fiction television show.
