= KBPG =

KBPG may refer to:

- KBPG (FM), a radio station (89.5 FM) licensed to Montevideo, Minnesota, United States
- Big Spring McMahon–Wrinkle Airport (ICAO code KBPG)
