= Midland International Air and Space Port =

American airport and spaceport in Texas

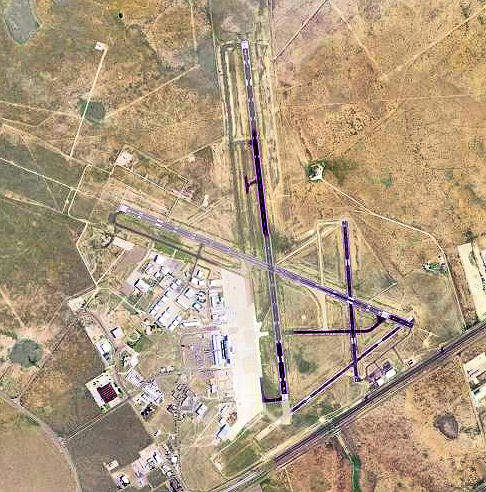
- 2006 USGS photo
- IATA: MAF; ICAO: KMAF; FAA LID: MAF

Summary
- Airport type: Public
- Operator: City of Midland
- Serves: Midland and Odessa, Texas
- Location: Midland County, between Midland and Odessa, Texas, USA
- Elevation AMSL: 2,871 ft (875 m)
- Coordinates: 31°56′33″N 102°12′07″W
- Website: www.FlyMAF.com

Map
- Interactive map of Midland International Air and Space Port

Runways
Direction	Length		Surface
Direction	ft	m	Surface
04/22	4,605	1,404	Asphalt
10/28	8,302	2,530	Asphalt
16L/34R	4,339	1,323	Asphalt
16R/34L	9,501	2,896	Asphalt

Statistics (2021)
- Aircraft operations (year ending 7/31/2021): 58,010
- Based aircraft: 106
- Sources: airport website and FAA

Midland International Air and Space Port (IATA: MAF, ICAO: KMAF, FAA LID: MAF) (formerly Midland International Airport) is in the city limits of Midland, Texas, United States, about midway between Downtown Midland and Downtown Odessa, owned and operated by the City of Midland. In September 2014, it was licensed by the Federal Aviation Administration to serve commercial spaceflight.

== Overview ==
The airport has five airlines, three serving hubs with regional jets and one flying mainline jets. Southwest Airlines is the largest carrier at the airport. In 2012, 497,193 passengers were enplaned.

== History ==
=== Origins ===
The airport started as Sloan Field, a small airport started in 1927 by Samuel Addison Sloan. Sloan leased 220 acres of flat grassland from Clarence Scharbauer, a rancher. Sam Sloan died in a plane crash in 1929, and his brother, William Harvey Sloan, continued the operation. In 1939, Harvey Sloan sold the field to the City of Midland for $14,500.

As war clouds gathered over Europe in the late 1930s, Midland businessmen could foresee the possibility of a military base in West Texas and in 1940 they started promoting the airfield for use as a training base to the military establishment in Washington. The airfield was upgraded by the Works Progress Administration with runway and taxiway improvements and lighting. Brigadier General G.C. Brant, Commander of the Gulf Coast Air Corps Training Center at Randolph Field, visited and reported that the situation at Midland was favorable. On June 13, 1941, it was announced that Midland would become a training base, Midland Army Air Field.

=== World War II ===
Midland Army Air Field was home to the Army Air Forces Bombardier School, one of a dozen bombardier-training schools. It was one of the "West Texas Bombardier Quadrangle" schools of the Army Air Forces Training Command, along with Childress Army Airfield, San Angelo Army Airfield and Big Spring Army Airfield. The sole purpose of the Bombardier College was to train young men to use the Norden bombsight.

The first group of cadets, Class 42–6, arrived for training from Ellington, Texas, on February 6, 1942. Midland reached a peak base population of more than 4,000 and graduated a total of 6,627 bombardier officers by the conclusion of the training mission on January 1, 1946.

=== Postwar civil use ===
The City of Midland annexed much of the land housing the airport on April 26, 1946, while a piece that became a part of a runway was annexed on February 25, 1964.

Midland-Odessa Regional Airport opened its new passenger terminal in the early 1960s. It was served by Continental Airlines and Trans-Texas Airways (and American Airlines, until 1963); the first jets were Continental Boeing 707s in 1965. The terminal had a scalloped roofline, allowing a column-free interior. All services (ticketing, baggage claim and concessions) were inside the building, and a single departure lounge opened onto the apron.

The late 1970s "oil boom" led to economic growth and more flights by incumbent airlines and new entrants like Southwest Airlines; American Airlines returned in June 1981, and America West arrived in 1987.

A new gate area was built along the apron with four second-level gates with jet bridges, concession space and escalator wells linking the addition to the existing terminal. The south end of the main terminal was extended with more ticketing space and the original terminal was modernized (the scalloped roofline was removed).

By the 1990s, several new-entrant carriers had pulled out and most of the rest had downgraded to regional jets; only Southwest, the airport's largest carrier, operated main line jets. The terminal building looked tired, and airport officials began planning a replacement. Construction began (in the infield parking lot) in 1996. The first half of the new terminal opened in early 1999 and the 1966 terminal was demolished. The second half of the new terminal was finished in late 1999. The first airplane built and flown in Texas, the "Pliska" (an approximate copy of the Wright Flyer II) was donated to the airport and is displayed in the terminal over the baggage-claim area.

The Confederate Air Force (now the Commemorative Air Force) moved to Midland in 1991 and holds an annual airshow featuring its warbird aircraft at the airport.

In 2012, the Midland City Council amended a contract allowing three teams of experts – Midland International Airport, Parkhill, and Smith & Cooper – to prepare and submit a commercial space launch site application. On September 17, 2014, the Federal Aviation Administration formally approved the application, making Midland International Airport the first primary commercial service airport to be certified as a spaceport. The original primary purpose of the launch site was to permit XCOR Aerospace to test its reusable winged commercial space vehicle, XCOR Lynx. The company relocated its headquarters to the Midland International Airport from where it had planned to offer commercial space flights. The XCOR research & development facility was planned to be located at the airport as part of a $10 million economic development incentive deal. However, as XCOR has since gone out of business, Midland Development Corp. is looking for other space companies to use the facilities.

On April 22, 2024, Delta Air Lines returned to Midland with three daily flights to Austin Bergstrom International Airport.

== Facilities and aircraft ==
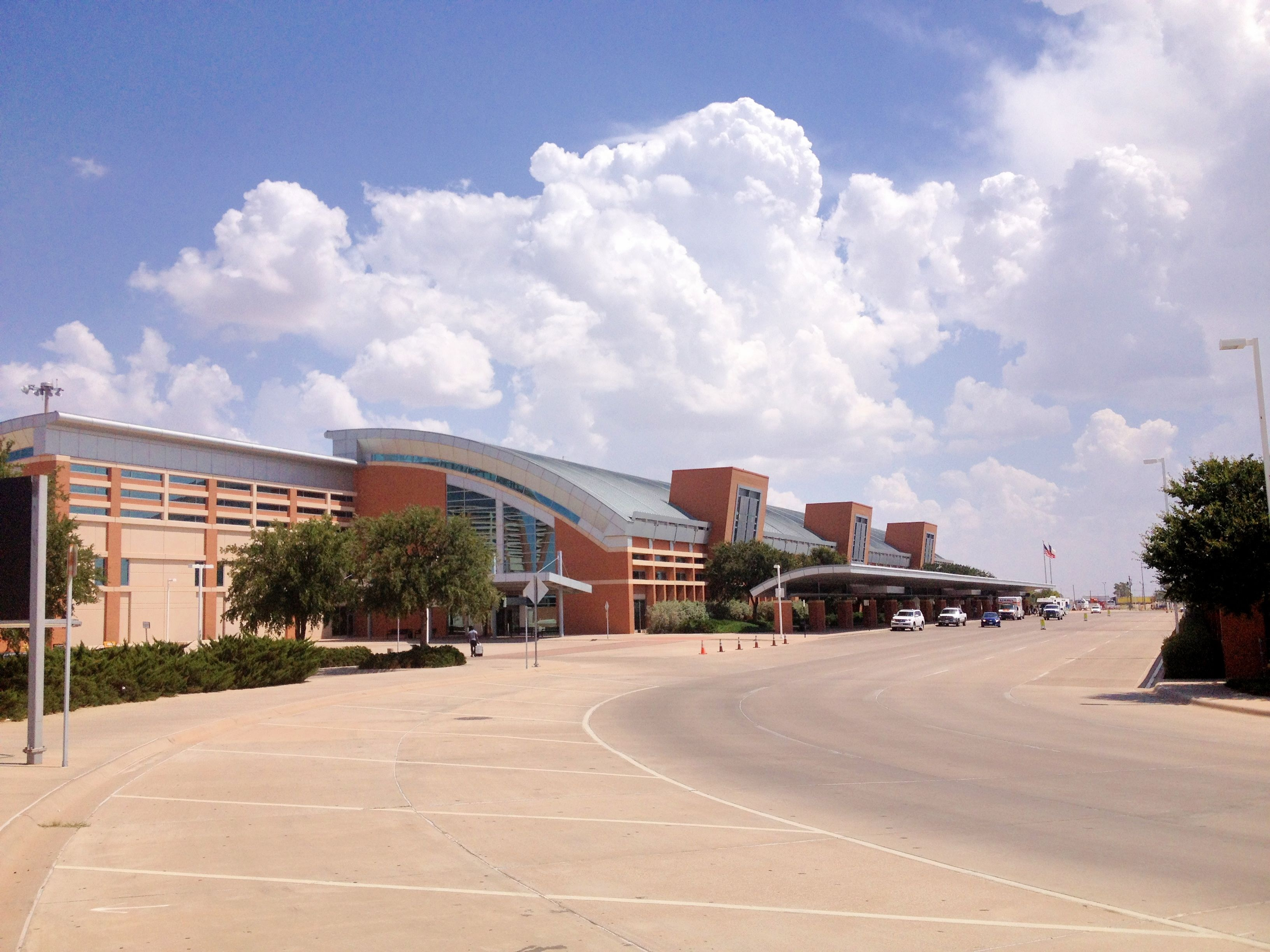
Terminal in August 2013

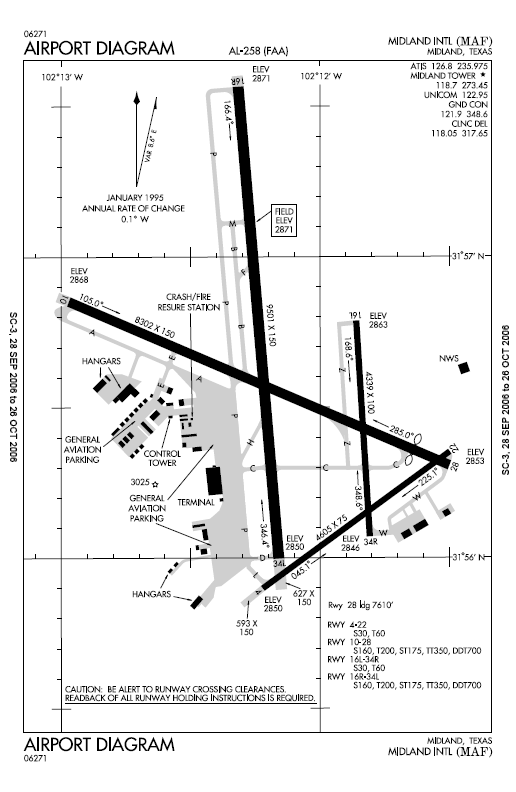
Airport map

Midland International Air and Space Port covers 1,600 acres (650 ha) at an elevation of 2,871 feet (875 m). It has four asphalt runways:

- 4/22: 4,605 ft × 75 ft (1,404 m × 23 m)
- 10/28: 8,302 ft × 150 ft (2,530 m × 46 m)
- 16L/34R: 4,339 ft × 100 ft (1,323 m × 30 m)
- 16R/34L: 9,501 ft × 150 ft (2,896 m × 46 m)

For the 12-month period ending July 31, 2021, the airport had 58,010 aircraft operations, average 159 per day: 29% military, 39% general aviation, 10% air taxi and 22% airline. 106 aircraft were then based at the airport: 36 single-engine propeller, 37 multi-engine propeller, 30 jet and 3 helicopter.

== Airlines and destinations ==
=== Passenger ===
Airlines	Destinations
American Eagle	Dallas/Fort Worth, Phoenix–Sky Harbor
Southwest Airlines	Austin, Dallas–Love, Denver, Houston–Hobby, Las Vegas
United Airlines	Houston–Intercontinental
United Express	Denver, Houston–Intercontinental

Destinations map
Destinations from KMAF in Midland, Texas

Cargo

Airlines	Destinations
Empire Airlines	Lubbock

== Statistics ==
=== Top destinations ===
Busiest domestic routes from MAF (April 2025 – March 2026)
Rank	City	Passengers	Carriers
1	Dallas-Fort Worth, Texas	164,610	American
2	Houston–Intercontinental, Texas	145,430	United
3	Houston–Hobby, Texas	128,360	Southwest
4	Dallas-Love, Texas	116,730	Southwest
5	Denver, Colorado	75,840	United, Southwest
6	Austin, Texas	54,860	Delta (Ended Nov. 8, 2025), Southwest
7	Las Vegas, Nevada	35,850	Southwest
8	Phoenix–Sky Harbor, Arizona	17,680	American

=== Airline market share ===
Airline market share (April 2025 – March 2026)
Rank	Carrier	Passengers	Share
1	Southwest	661,000	44.81%
2	SkyWest	331,000	22.46%
3	Envoy	231,000	15.70%
4	Mesa	147,000	9.97%
5	United	81,240	5.51%
—	Other	22,850	1.55%

== Ground transportation ==
=== Intercity bus ===
All Aboard America! provides twice daily service between Midland International Air and Space Port and Presidio, with intermediate stops at Odessa, Crane, McCamey, Ft. Stockton, Alpine, and Marfa.

== Accidents and incidents ==
- On November 26, 1983, a Texas Western Aviation Beechcraft King Air crashed on final approach to MAF after initiating a go-around. The plane pitched up in an extremely nose high attitude, entered a left bank, stalled and crashed. All eight occupants (one crew, seven passengers) were killed. The cause was undetermined.

== See also ==
- List of airports in Texas
