= Draughon–Miller Central Texas Regional Airport =

Airport in Texas, United States

Draughon–Miller Central Texas Regional Airport (former Temple Army Airfield)
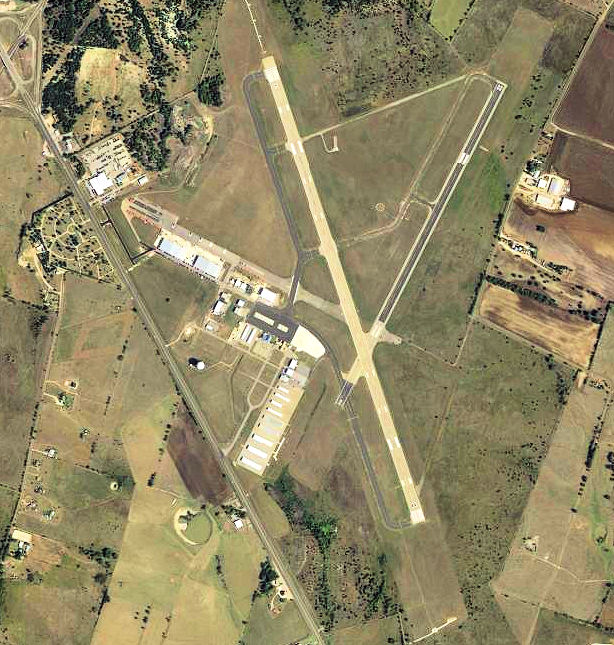
- USGS 2006 orthophoto
- IATA: TPL; ICAO: KTPL; FAA LID: TPL

Summary
- Airport type: Public
- Owner: City of Temple
- Serves: Temple, Texas
- Elevation AMSL: 682 ft (208 m)
- Coordinates: 31°09′07″N 97°24′28″W
- Website: www.TempleTexas.us/...

Map
- Location within Texas

Runways
Direction	Length		Surface
Direction	ft	m	Surface
16/34	7,000	2,134	Asphalt
3/21	4,740	1,445	Asphalt

Statistics (2023)
- Aircraft operations (year ending 6/9/2023): 41,124
- Based aircraft: 267
- Source: Federal Aviation Administration

Draughon–Miller Central Texas Regional Airport (IATA: TPL, ICAO: KTPL, FAA LID: TPL) is six miles northwest of Temple, in Bell County, Texas. The National Plan of Integrated Airport Systems for 2011–2015 categorized it as a general aviation facility.

== History ==
In July 1942 the United States Army Air Forces acquired pasture land and began construction of Temple Army Air Field. including three concrete runways, several taxiways, a parking apron and a control tower, along with housing and other buildings. Buildings were utilitarian and quickly assembled. Most base buildings, not meant for long-term use, were built of temporary or semi-permanent materials. Although some hangars had steel frames, and the occasional brick or tile brick building could be seen, most support buildings sat on concrete foundations but were of frame construction clad in little more than plywood and tar paper.

Temple AAF was a sub-base of Waco Army Airfield and was used as a basic flying school by the Army Air Forces Flying Training Command, Gulf Training Center (later Central Flying Training Command). Cadets received basic flying indoctrination and training, primarily in North American BT-9s and Stearman PT-17s. By late 1944, its primary activity was multi-engine transition training and combat crew assembling on North American B-25 Mitchell medium bombers. Flight training continued until the base was closed on 31 October 1945.

With the end of the war the airfield was determined to be excess by the military and turned over to the City of Temple, which closed "Temple Municipal Airport," [which had been built about 2 miles northwest of the central business district in 1937 by Works Progress Administration] and renamed Temple Army Airfield "Draughon–Miller" in honor of two Temple fliers who had died in World War II. The city used the former site of Temple Municipal Airport first as a landfill, and later for a planned industrial area.

=== Previous airline service ===
The first airline flights were operated by Pioneer Air Lines with twin engine Douglas DC-3 prop aircraft in 1947. Pioneer was then acquired by and merged into Continental Airlines which in 1955 was operating daily DC-3 service with a multi-stop routing of Midland, TX/Odessa, TX – Big Spring, TX – Snyder, TX – Abilene, TX – Breckenridge, TX – Fort Worth – Dallas Love Field – Waco, TX – Temple – College Station, TX – Houston Hobby Airport. In 1963, Continental operated its last DC-3 flight from the airport. Trans-Texas Airways (TTa) DC-3s served Temple from 1956 to 1959 and then resumed service when Continental pulled out. In 1968, Trans-Texas was operating nine flights a day from the airport all with Convair 600 turboprops with nonstop service to San Antonio (with two flights a day), College Station and Waco as well as direct service to Dallas Love Field (with five flights a day), Houston Hobby Airport (with three flights a day), Corpus Christi, Harlingen, TX, McAllen, TX and Victoria, TX. By 1970, TTa had changed its name to Texas International which in turn continued to serve Temple with Convair 600 turboprops until 1976. The Official Airline Guide (OAG) lists two airlines serving Temple in 1976: Texas International with direct one stop Convair 600 service flown twice a day from Dallas/Fort Worth (DFW) via a stop in Waco and commuter air carrier Rio Airways also with direct one stop service from Dallas/Fort Worth via Waco with seven flights a day flown with small Beechcraft 99 turboprop aircraft. By 1979, Rio Airways was operating six nonstop flights a day from Dallas/Fort Worth with Beechcraft 99 aircraft and by 1981 Rio was operating nine direct one stop flights a day from DFW via Waco with de Havilland Canada DHC-6 Twin Otter commuter turboprops. Rio Airways then became a Delta Connection air carrier operating code sharing flights for Delta Air Lines which had begun operating a hub at the Dallas/Fort Worth International Airport (DFW) and in 1985 was operating five flights a day from Dallas/Fort Worth with Beechcraft 99 and Beechcraft 1900C commuter propjets. However, by 1987 Rio had ceased operations and had gone out of business, and there were no longer any airline flights between the airport and Dallas/Fort Worth.

The airport currently does not have any scheduled airline passenger service.

== Facilities ==
The airport covers 922 acres (373 ha) at an elevation of 682 feet (208 m). It has two asphalt runways: 16/34 is 7,000 by 150 feet (2,134 x 46 m) and 3/21 is 4,740 by 100 feet (1,445 x 30 m).

In the year ending June 9, 2023, the airport had 41,124 aircraft operations, average 113 per day: 81% general aviation and 18% military. 267 aircraft were then based at the airport: 147 military, 89 single-engine, 11 multi-engine, 10 jet, 9 helicopter, and 1 glider.

== See also ==
- Texas World War II Army Airfields
- List of airports in Texas

== Other sources ==
- Manning, Thomas A. (2005), History of Air Education and Training Command, 1942–2002. Office of History and Research, Headquarters, AETC, Randolph AFB, Texas OCLC 71006954, 29991467
- Shaw, Frederick J. (2004), Locating Air Force Base Sites, History’s Legacy, Air Force History and Museums Program, United States Air Force, Washington DC. OCLC 57007862, 1050653629
- Thole, Lou (1999), Forgotten Fields of America : World War II Bases and Training, Then and Now – Vol. 2. Publisher: Pictorial Histories Pub, ISBN 1-57510-051-7
