= San Angelo Army Air Field =

World War II Army air field in Texas

San Angelo Army Airfield
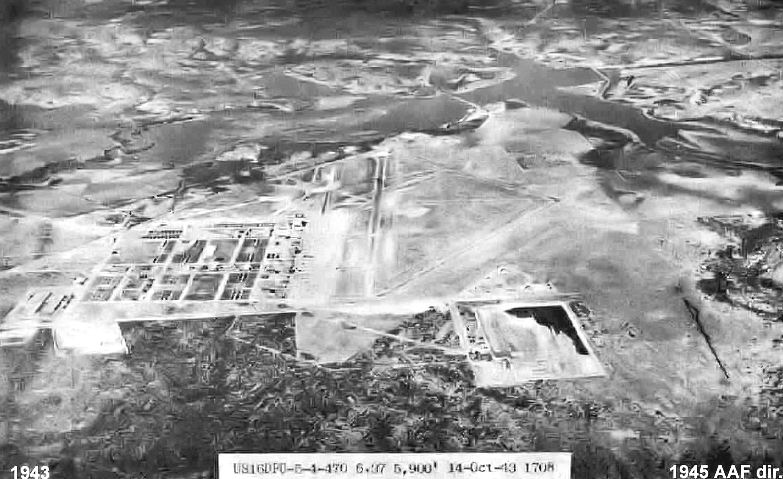
- San Angelo Army Airfield – 14 October 1943
- IATA: none; ICAO: none

Summary
- Location: San Angelo, Texas
- Built: 1941–1942
- In use: 1942–1945
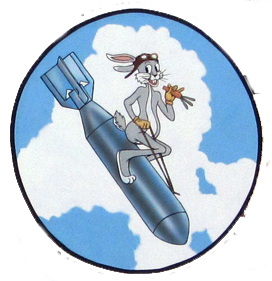
- Occupants: San Angelo AAF Bombardier training school
- Coordinates: 31°21′18″N 100°29′47″W

Map
- San Angelo Army Airfield, Texas

Runways
Direction	Length		Surface
Direction	ft	m	Surface
02L/20R	5,868	1,789	Asphalt
02R/20L	5,938	1,810	Asphalt
09/27	5,000	1,524	Asphalt
14/32	5,144	1,568	Asphalt
- Texas World War II Airfield information

San Angelo Army Airfield is an inactive United States Air Force base, about 8 miles south-southwest of San Angelo, Texas. It was active during World War II as a training airfield. It was closed on 30 November 1945.

== History ==
Initially built as "Carr Field" Municipal Airport, the original airport was on a 670-acre site being developed by the Works Progress Administration (WPA). It had two 4,500-ft runways with a third main of about 6,200 ft. Construction was well underway by the time of the Pearl Harbor attack, after which discussions were held to convert Carr Field to an Army Air corps base.

The primary mission of the field was to train bombardiers for North American B-25 Mitchell, Martin B-26 Marauder medium, Boeing B-17 Flying Fortress, and Consolidated B-24 Liberator heavy bombers, and later Boeing B-29 Superfortress very heavy bombers for combat missions during World War II. San Angelo AAF was one of the "West Texas Bombardier Quadrangle" schools of the Army Air Forces Training Command. The other bases in the quad were Midland Army Airfield, Childress Army Airfield, and Big Spring Army Airfield.

Army personnel arrived in San Angelo in May 1942 and the construction of the civil airport was taken over by military construction crews in May 1942. Additional land was acquired and the military airfield eventually totaled almost 1,700 acres in size.

The base was activated on 1 June 1942 and jurisdiction was transferred to the Army Air Forces Training Command. However, the base was far from ready to perform any type of military training. Runway construction consisted of expanding the former civil airport into a four-asphalt-runway configuration along with seven hangars. In addition, the building of a large support base was carried out with barracks, various administrative buildings, maintenance shops, and hangars. The station facility consisted of a large number of buildings based on standardized plans and architectural drawings, with the buildings designed to be the "cheapest, temporary character with structural stability only sufficient to meet the needs of the service which the structure is intended to fulfill during the period of its contemplated war use" was underway. To conserve critical materials, most facilities were constructed of wood, concrete, brick, gypsum board, and concrete asbestos. Metal was sparsely used. The station was designed to be nearly self-sufficient, with not only hangars, but also barracks, warehouses, hospitals, dental clinics, dining halls, and maintenance shops were needed. There were libraries, social clubs for officers and enlisted men, and stores to buy living necessities. Over 250 buildings, together with complete water, sewer, electric, and gas utilities, the airfield served over 4,000 military personnel.

It was not until 8 January 1943 that Training Command activated the 34th Flying Training Wing (Bombardier and Specialized Twin- and Four-Engine) at the base, its mission being the training of bombardiers and specialized pilot two- and four-engine flying training. The 34th was one of two dedicated bombardier training wings, the other being the 38th at Williams Field, Arizona (later moved to Kirtland Field, New Mexico). Schools were also established at seven other locations in Central and Western Flying Training Commands (Victorville AAF, California; Carlsbad AAF, Deming AAF, and Roswell AAF, New Mexico; and Childress AAF, Midland AAF, and Big Spring AAF, Texas).

=== Operations ===
The first training class (42-17) began in September 1942 when the field was about 90% complete. Flying cadets came from phase one flight schools at Ellington Field, Texas, and Santa Anna Army Airbase, California. The primary twin-engine trainer was the Beechcraft AT-11 Kansan, which provided both twin-engine training for pilots and could have practice bombs loaded for bombardier training, as the aircraft had a large glass nose where the trainee could sit and become familiar with the Norden bombsight. Later, some obsolete B-18 Bolos were used as the classes grew larger and the need for additional aircraft increased. Classes were organized into four "Flights", designated "A", "B", "C", and "D".

Early training at San Angelo AAF reflected the need to get men into combat quickly. The ground school was opened by a dozen second lieutenants who were recent graduates of the Officer Training School at Miami Beach, Florida, but none of them had any experience on the Norden bombsight or had any bombardier training. Initially, trained bombardiers were pulled from combat squadrons to perform the academic instruction in bombing techniques and flew along with the cadets making practice bomb drops and teaching them from their practical experience, more than from a syllabus. As time passed, recent graduates of the school at San Angelo, as well as other bombardier schools, became the instructors.

The first course of instruction was 12 weeks long, which again reflected the urgent need for bombardiers in the heavy and medium bombers which were beginning to roll off the production lines at Boeing, Martin, Consolidated, Ford, and other plants. The course used was modeled after the one already in use at Midland Army Airfield, Texas, which consisted of about 35 hours of bombing training, actual flying missions, and about 225 hours of classroom work. This included a study of the theory of bombing, automatic flight control equipment, bombsight maintenance in the field, and equipment. Practice missions were flown with 100-pound inert bombs that were dropped from altitudes ranging from 300 to 12,000 feet. Each cadet dropped about 200 bombs during training. Most of the time, the initial graduates spent in the first 12-week course was devoted to the use of the Norden bombsight and bombing accuracy with it.

Later, as time permitted and the number of graduates increased, the course was extended to 18 weeks in July 1943, which added instruction in night and dead-reckoning navigation. To accommodate the navigation training, both types of training were included in the same flight for the multiple pilots and navigators assigned to each aircraft and the length of the flights were extended, making simulated bomb runs over several simulated targets and dropping practice bombs over several practice ranges set up.

The training program was again extended to 24 weeks in October 1944, but this led to problems with the availability of the M-38A2 practice bombs. At the time, trainees were required to drop 20 practice bombs each per month, and students normally dropped as many as 200. However, due to a shortage of practice bombs, this was reduced to a maximum of 125. Some of the major additional to the course was the extension of flying time from 120 to 150 hours. Academic hours were increased in the ground school to study bomb racks and their in-flight maintenance, fuses, bombs, bombing analysis, radio navigation aids, glide bombing, and other subjects. Also, a 10-hour course was added in the use of the Astro-Compass.

The Norden bombsight was one of America's most closely guarded secrets at the time. They were removed from the aircraft when not in use and stored in one of three vaults in the bombsight maintenance building. The building was surrounded by a double barbed wire fence and kept under armed guard 24/7. Each trainee had to sign an oath of secrecy before starting the training. Most of the students were cadets, and upon graduation, would be commissioned as second lieutenants. Some later classes, however, received new students who had received their commission in other areas and were retraining.

1942-1945 San Angelo Army Airfield photos

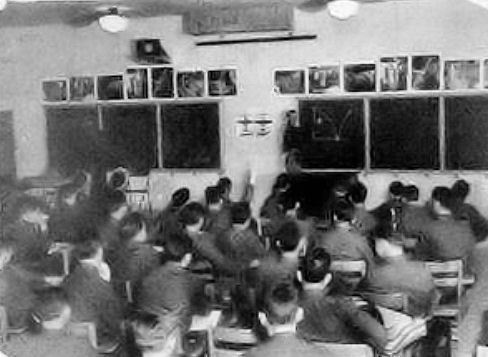
Ground Classroom Training

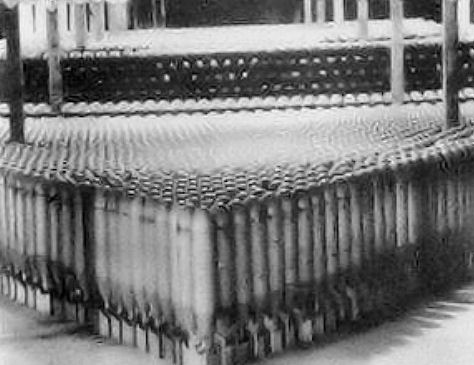
M-38A2 concrete practice bombs

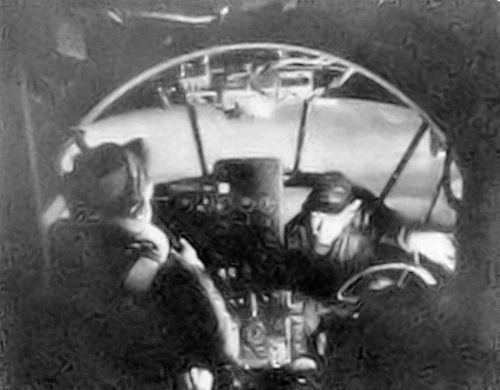
Flying training in the AT-11 Kansan

=== Closure ===
By early 1945, the urgent need for bombardiers was over and the number of trainees was significantly reduced. Enough bombardiers were available to meet anticipated needs, so the cadets in the training program underwent more thorough training. The concrete bomb shortage was past, and in March 1945, the 1,000,000th concrete practice bomb was dropped. The end of the war in Europe in May further cut back the number of trainees, and in August, the victory over Japan the role for which San Angelo Army Airfield ended. Notice from Army Air Forces Training Command was received that all training would stop on 15 August. Students and officers were given a choice of separation or being allowed to remain in the postwar Air Force and continue training. Those who elected for separation, however, were not immediately separated, but given nonflying duties around the field, and many did not receive their discharges until October.

The last class of bombardiers from San Angelo AAF graduated on 12 September, and all classes in progress were halted on 24 September. The remaining students were reassigned to Midland Army Airfield to complete their training. Then in October, a limited amount of training was restarted, and as late as 1 November, still over 100 aircraft were on the parking ramp, primarily AT-11s, but also some B-24 Liberators and B-17 Flying Fortresses that had been transferred from heavy bomber training bases and were used as trainers. Finally, Training Command sent orders to San Angelo AAF that the base would be closed on 30 November. Some aircraft were reassigned to other open bases, but the vast majority were sent to reclamation facilities for scrapping. On 30 November 1945, the flag was lowered at San Angelo Army Airfield for the last time.

=== Current status ===
Ultimately, a transfer agreement was arranged after the war which allowed the City of San Angelo to reclaim its original 673.66-acre airport and also retain a lease on 896.7 acres of Tom Green County school land. The War Assets Administration also transferred almost all government-built-and-owned airport improvements to the city.

Today, the airfield is a civil airport named Mathis Field, in honor of First Lieutenant Jack W. Mathis, a bombardier who received the Medal of Honor posthumously as a result of his heroic actions over Germany in 1943. His brother, Mark Mathis, was also a bombardier who had requested an assignment to the 303d Bombardment Group, at Molesworth, England, the same group as which his brother Jack was assigned. Mark was on the base when the plane carrying his brother's body landed after the mission. At his own request, Mark Mathis was transferred into Jack Mathis' crew to replace him as bombardier. When the crew completed its tour of duty, Mark Mathis stayed in combat and was killed in action over the North Sea in May 1943 when his B-17 crashed into the North Sea as a result of combat damage. Today, a portrait of both brothers hangs in the lobby of Mathis Field Airport.

Three of the former wartime runways at Mathis Field are still in use. A new extended-length jet runway replaced the parallel twin north–south runways. The large aircraft parking apron remains, and two of the wartime hangars remain in use. The buildings of the ground station were sold, removed, or torn down over the years, and only some foundations remain in bushy areas. The streets still visible in aerial photography, some still accessible to drive through the abandoned station.

== See also ==
- Texas World War II Army Airfields
- 34th Flying Training Wing (World War II)
- Bombardier (film), a 1943 fictional war drama about the training program for bombardiers of the United States Army Air Forces.
