= Childress Army Airfield =

United States military airfield

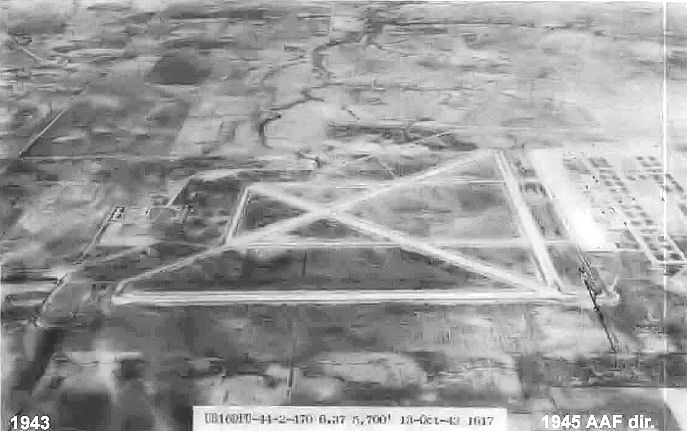
- Childress Army Airfield, Texas, 13 October 1943
- IATA: none; ICAO: none

Summary
- Location: Childress, Texas
- Built: 1942
- In use: 1942–1945
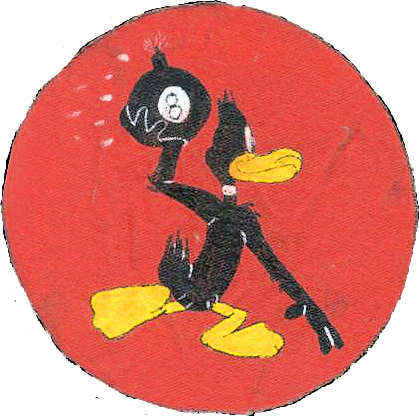
- Occupants: Childress AAF Bombardier training school
- Coordinates: 34°25′57″N 100°17′35″W

Map
- Childress Army Airfield, Texas

Runways
Direction	Length		Surface
Direction	ft	m	Surface
00/18	6,000	1,829	Asphalt
06/24	6,000	1,829	Asphalt
09/27	6,000	1,829	Asphalt
14/32	6,000	1,829	Asphalt

Childress Army Airfield is a former World War II military airfield, located 4.8 miles west of Childress, Texas. It operated as a Bombardier training school for the United States Army Air Forces from 1942 until 1945.

== History ==
Childress Army Airfield was initially authorized on 2 May 1942 and occupied an area of 2,474 acres. Construction of the field began immediately thereafter. An activation ceremony was held on 27 October 1942, and Col. John W. White assumed command on 24 November. The base was assigned to the Army Air Forces Central Flying Training Command.

The initial mission of Childress AAF was bombardier training and was one of the "West Texas Bombardier Quadrangle" schools of the Army Air Forces Training Command. The other bases in the quad were Midland Army Airfield, San Angelo Army Airfield and Big Spring Army Airfield.

Training was performed with the Beechcraft AT-11 Kansan. In addition, navigation training was added on 4 June 1943. Units assigned to the base were:

- Army Air Forces Bombardier School

Student Training Squadron 4
Student Training Squadron 8

- 488th Bombardier Training Group
- 361st Sub-Depot
- 331st Aviation Squadron
- 457th Base Headquarters and Air Base Squadron
- 1108th First Maintenance Squadron
- 1108th Second Maintenance Squadron
- 80th Bombardier Training Group
- 1097th Guard Squadron
- 857th Signal Company
- Detachment, 908th Quartermaster Company (Aviation Service)
- Detachment, 2052d Ordnance Company (Aviation Service)
- 325th Army Air Forces Band

=== Operations ===
1943 Class book for Bombardier Classes at the Childress Army Air Field

The Bombardier School opened and accepted its first class of cadets began training in late February 1943 and graduated in May. Members of this class (43-7) were dubbed the "Valentine of Steel" class, in reference to a dummy bomb that Mrs. White decorated as a Valentine to Hitler. Subsequent classes arrived at three-week intervals through the rest of the war and participated in an initial training program of eighteen weeks, later increased to twenty-four. Those who completed the work were designated flight officers or commissioned as second lieutenants.

The base produced the first classes qualified in both precision bombing and dead-reckoning navigation. In 3 1/2 years Childress AAF graduated thirty-five classes of bombardier-navigators; its 4,791 graduates made a tenth of the total World War II air force bombardier production.

The first "All-American Precision Bombing Olympics" was held at Childress in May 1943 with seven air fields participating. Such meets were held there and at other training bases at three-week intervals thereafter until April 1944. A special practice feature was skip-bombing on Lake Childress. A redeployment program for veteran bombardiers was instituted at the field to give retraining in line with development of bombing techniques.

The War Department also established a prisoner of war camp at the base.

Childress was renamed the 2512th Army Air Forces Base Unit on July 1, 1944.

1942-1945 Childress Army Airfield photos

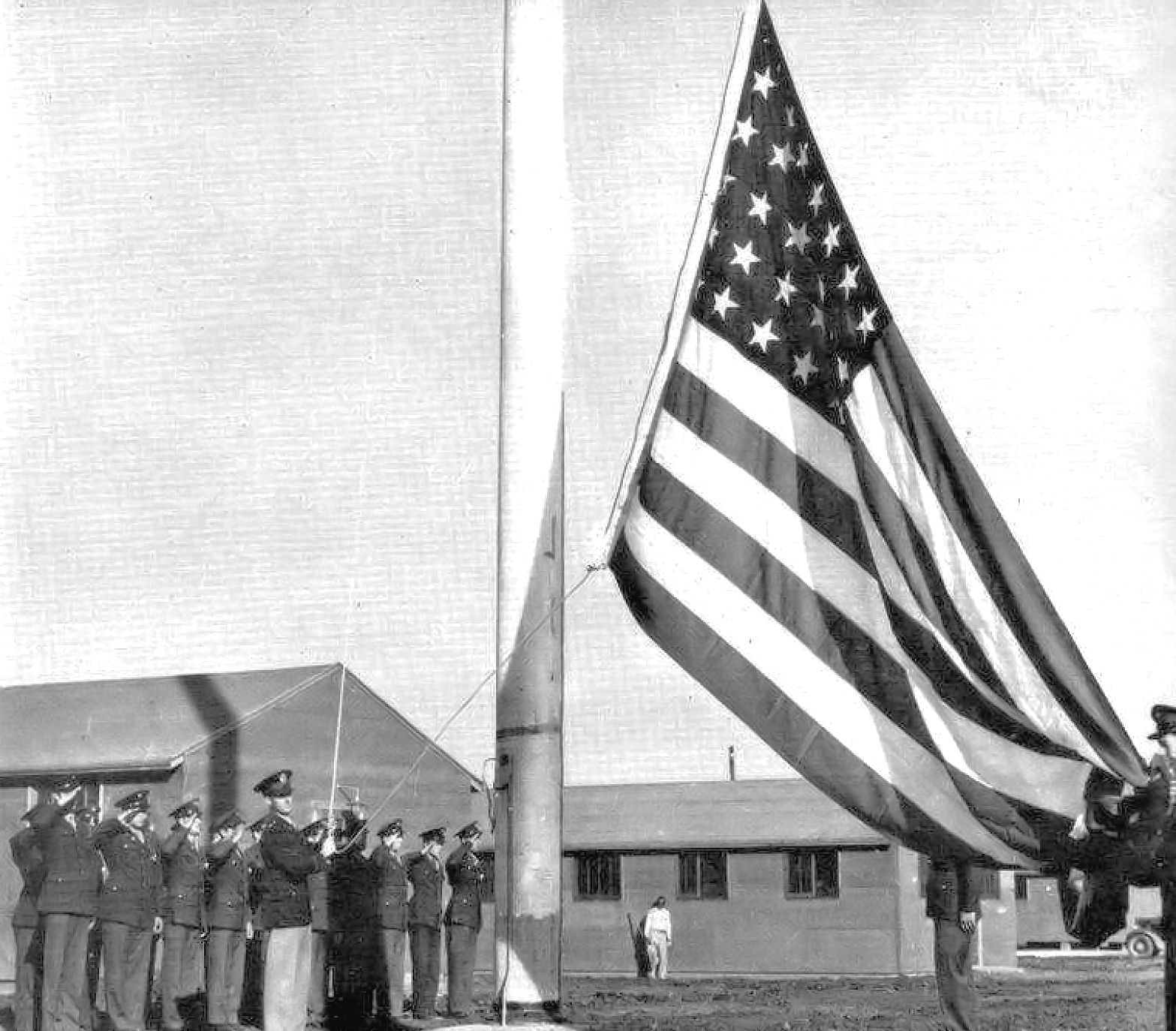
Childress Army Airfield – Dedication Ceremony 27 October 1942

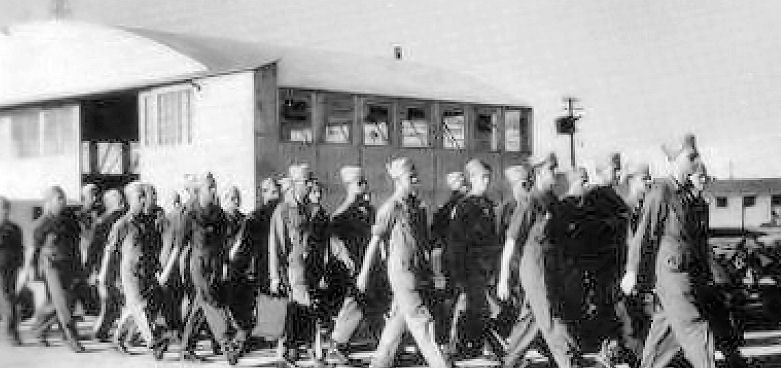
Cadets marching to aircraft

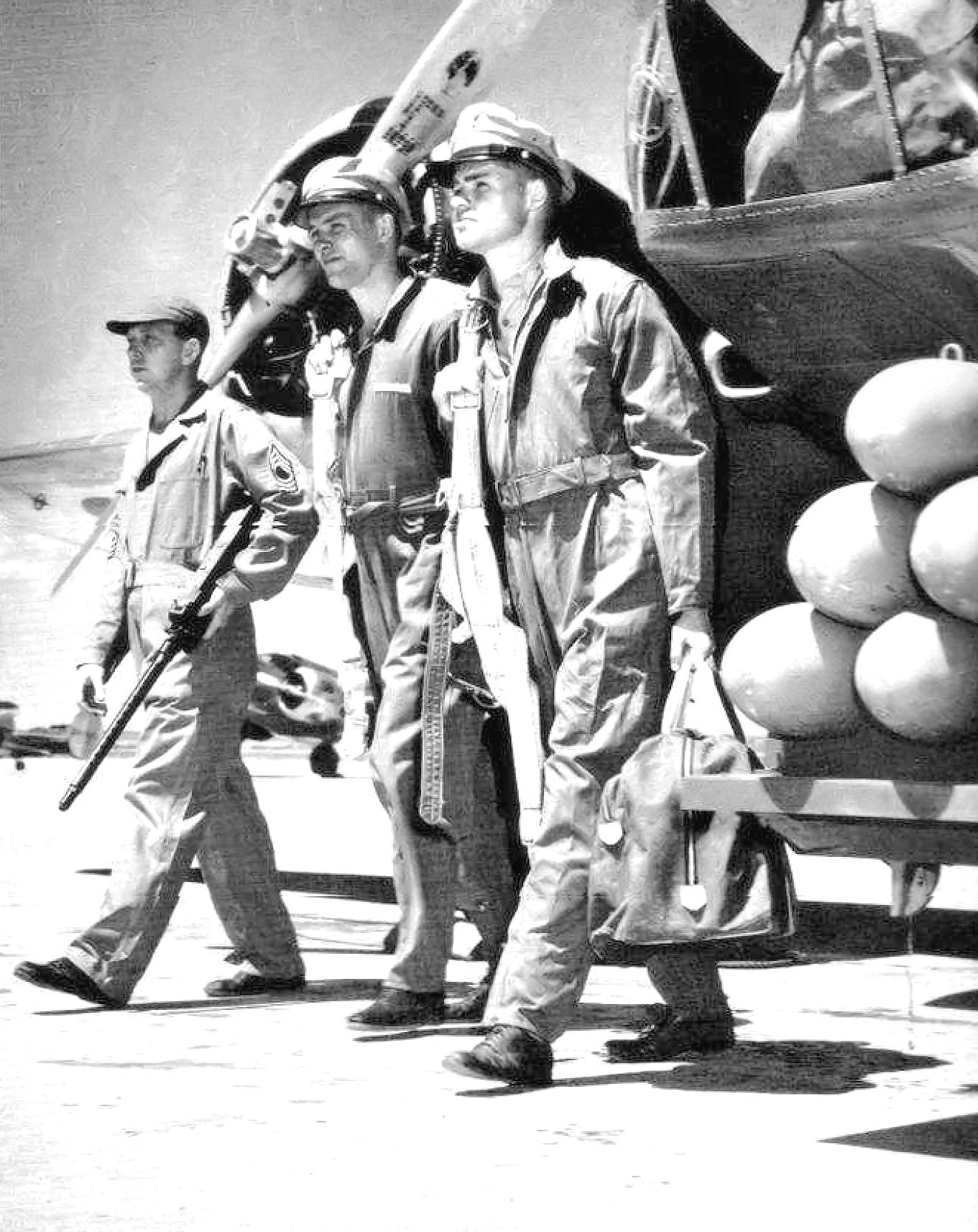
Bombardier cadet with trainer. Note Concrete practice bombs

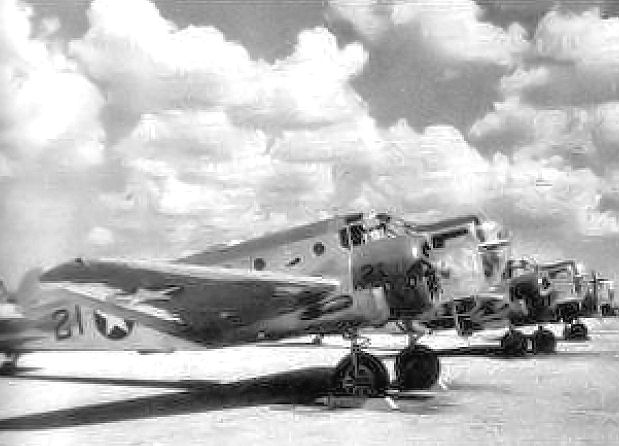
AT-11 Kansan Bombardier/Navigator trainer

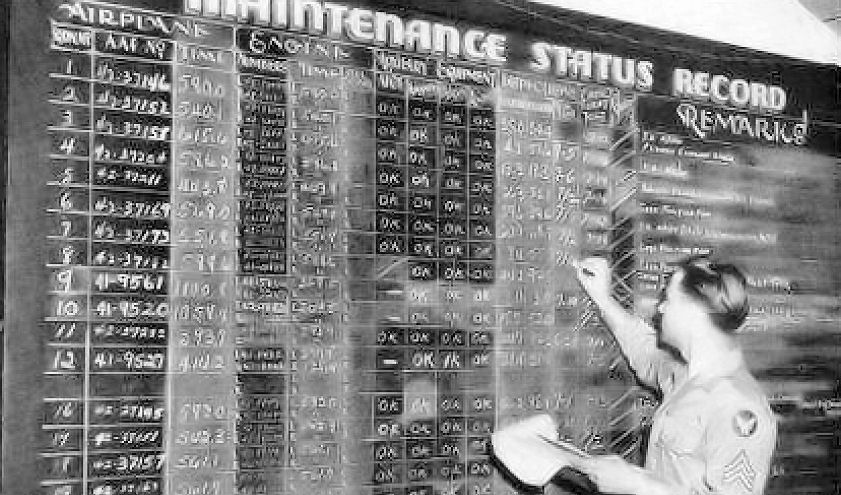
Aircraft Status Board

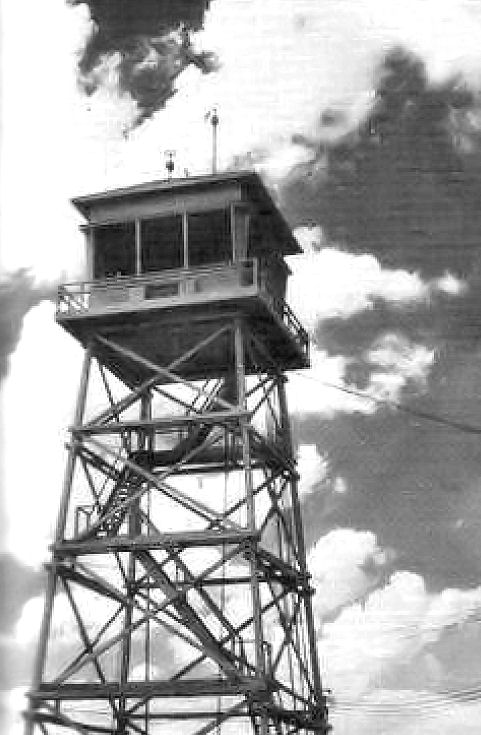
Airfield control tower

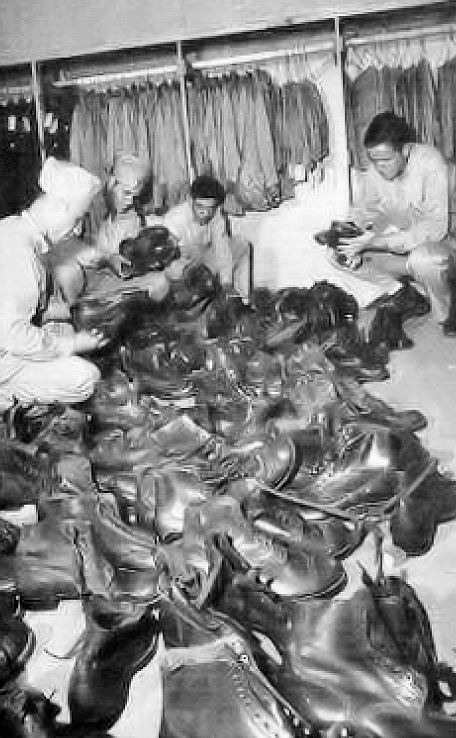
Clothing issue

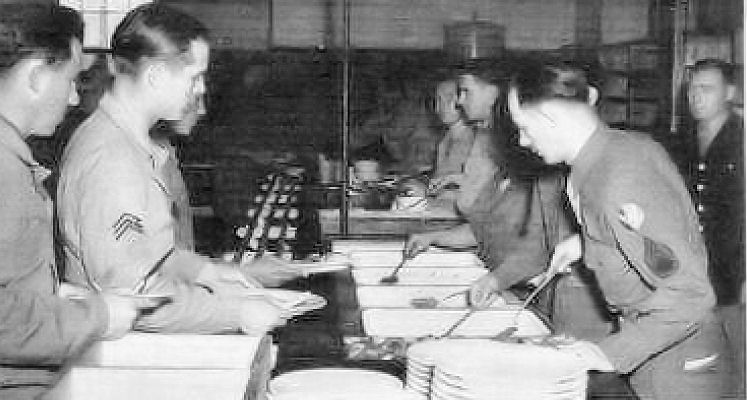
Dining Hall

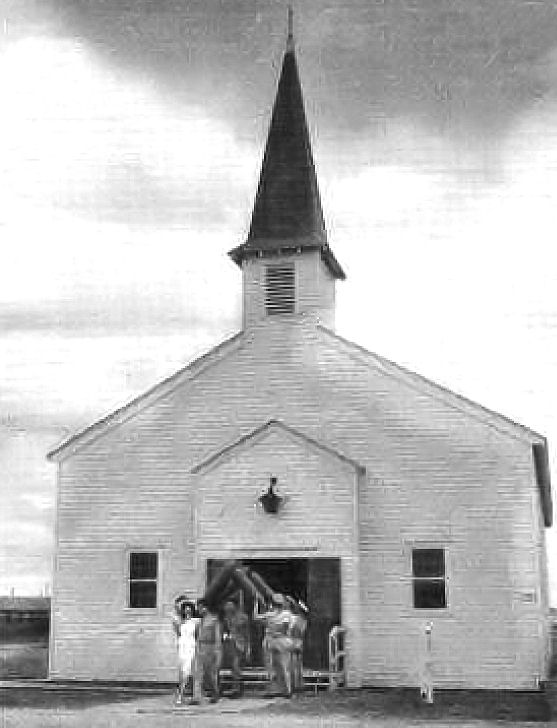
Post Chapel (Wedding)

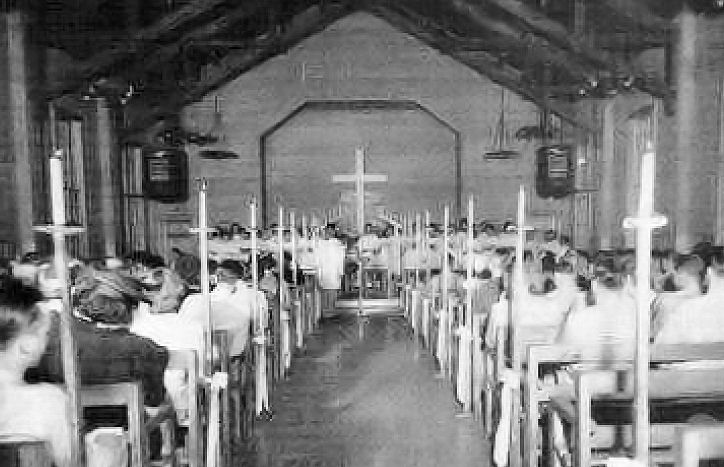
Chapel Interior

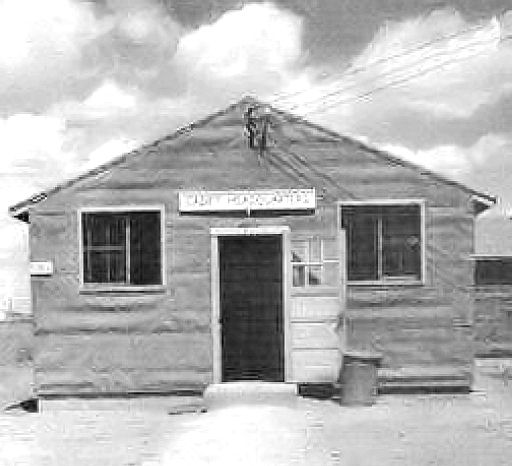
Cadet Headquarters

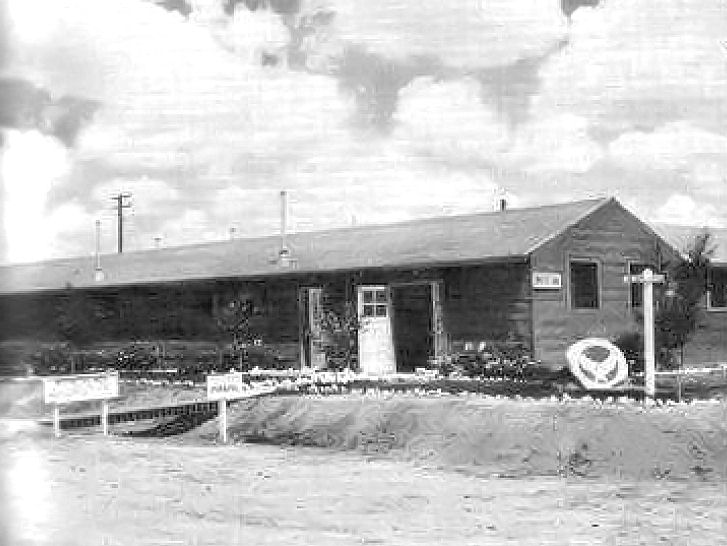
Post Photo Lab

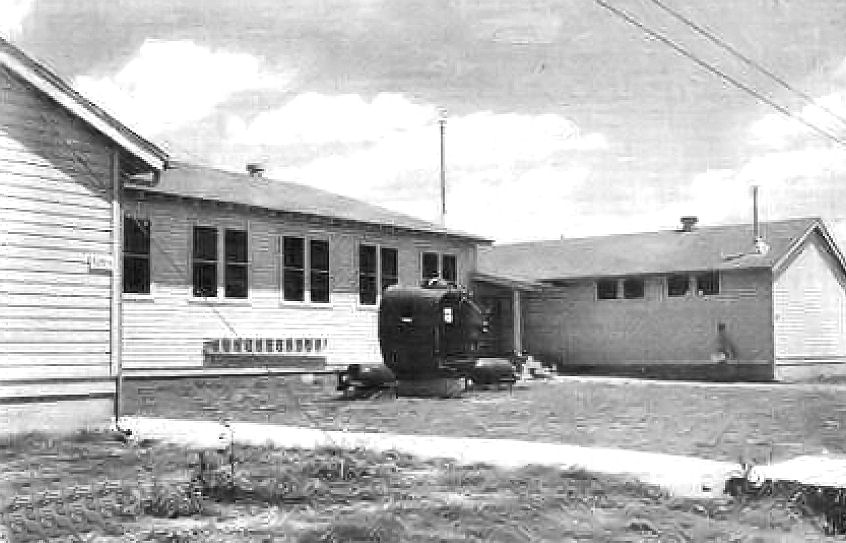
Bombardier Ground School

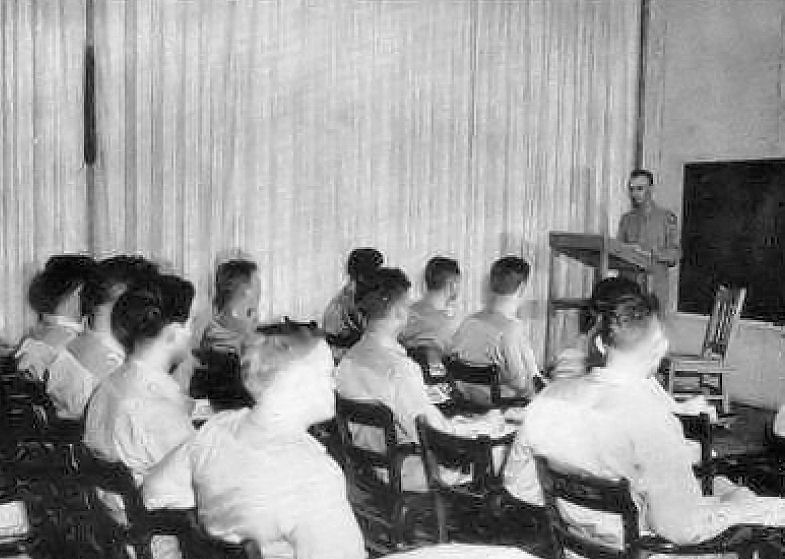
Ground training

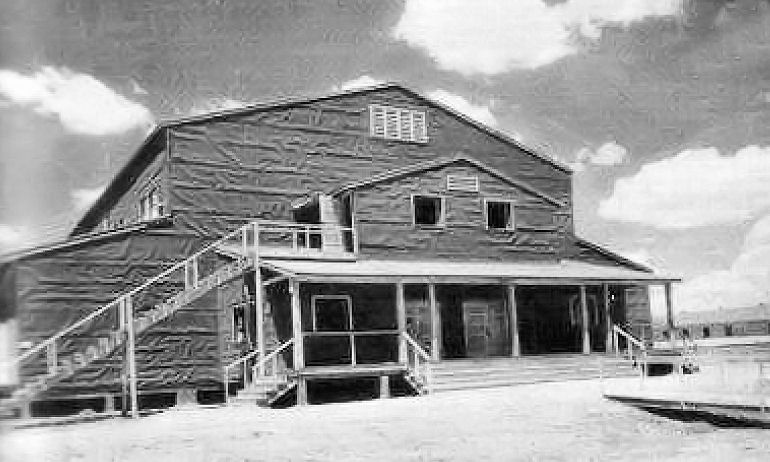
Gymnasium Building

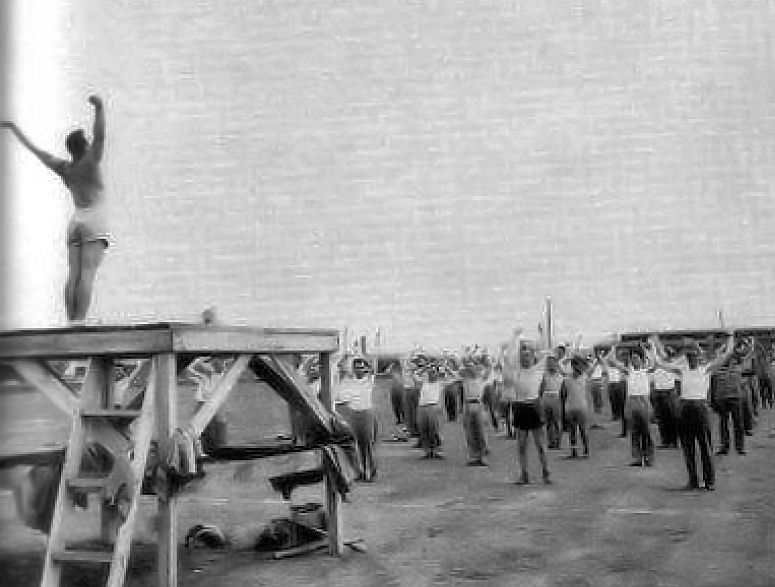
Physical Training

=== Postwar use ===
After the field was closed on December 21, 1945, it was given to the city and transformed into a municipal airport. Childress Municipal Airport is a commercial airport located within city limits, 4 miles west of central Childress, Texas. It is owned and operated by the city of Childress, Texas. A feature item of the CAAF museum exhibit is the Norden Bombsight, the great secret weapon of World War II, which was housed at CAAF during the war and was used to train bombardier pilots. It was stored in a vault in a small building which still stands (although in ruin) at the site of the airfield.

== See also ==
- Texas World War II Army Airfields
- 34th Flying Training Wing (World War II)
- Bombardier (film), a 1943 fictional war drama about the training program for bombardiers of the United States Army Air Forces.
