= Big Spring McMahon–Wrinkle Airport =

Airport in Texas

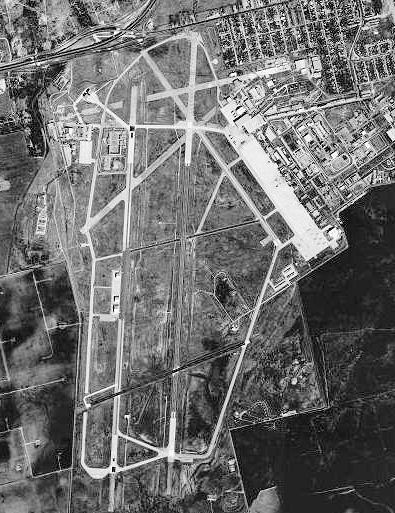
- USGS image, 15 February 1997
- IATA: HCA; ICAO: KBPG; FAA LID: BPG

Summary
- Airport type: Public
- Owner/Operator: City of Big Spring
- Serves: Big Spring, Texas
- Elevation AMSL: 2,573 ft (784 m)
- Coordinates: 32°12′45″N 101°31′18″W
- Website: www.mybigspring.com/...

Map
- Location within Texas

Runways
| Direction | Length | | Surface |
| Direction | ft | m | Surface |
|---|---|---|---|
| 18/36 | 8,802 | 2,683 | Asphalt/Concrete |
| 6/24 | 4,601 | 1,402 | Asphalt |

Statistics (2021)
- Aircraft operations (year ending 5/22/2021): 23,520
- Based aircraft: 39
- Sources: City of Big Spring, FAA

Big Spring McMahon–Wrinkle Airport (IATA: HCA, ICAO: KBPG, FAA LID: BPG) is a municipal airport two miles southwest of Big Spring, in Howard County, Texas. The FAA's National Plan of Integrated Airport Systems for 2009–2013 categorized it as a general aviation airport.

Most U.S. airports use the same three-letter location identifier for the FAA and IATA, but this airport is BPG to the FAA and HCA to the IATA (which assigned BPG to Barra do Garças Airport in Barra do Garças, Mato Grosso, Brazil).

== History ==
=== World War II ===
Big Spring Army Air Field opened on 28 April 1942 as part of the United States Army Air Forces Central Flying Training Command; it was to train aviation cadets in high altitude precision bombing. (Note: USAFHRA Document 00169712) The airfield received its first class of cadets in September 1942. The AT-11 (Beechcraft Model 18) and the B-18 Bolo were the primary aircraft flown for training. The 79th Bombardier Training Group (Note: USAFHRA Document 00147684) continued operations until the surrender of Japan, when the cadets who agreed to remain in postwar service were transferred to Midland AAF, Texas. The last class graduated on 26 September 1945. The base was declared surplus and reverted to city control in November 1945, (Note: USAFHRA Document 00169727) and it was Big Spring Municipal Airport for six years.

=== Webb Air Force Base ===
As a result of the need for trained pilots for the Korean War, the airfield reopened on October 1, 1951. The base was renamed Webb Air Force Base in 1952 for Lieutenant James L. Webb, a Big Spring native and World War II combat pilot, who was killed off the Japanese coast in 1949.

The 3560th Pilot Training Wing (later redesignated the 78th Flying Training Wing) was stationed at the base, and instruction of the first class began in April 1952. The base population soon passed the 2,000 mark. By the end of 1968 almost 9,000 pilots had been trained at Webb.

In 1956 the 331st Fighter Interceptor Squadron was transferred to Webb from Stewart Air Force Base in New York to defend the United States border with air intercept missions. In March 1967 the 331st was redesignated the 4760th Combat Crew Training Squadron and charged with training Royal Jordanian Air Force students. It was inactivated when the Jordanians were recalled because of the war with Israel in the summer of 1967.

Webb was also the site of annual summer training for college Air Force Reserve Officers Training Corps (AFROTC) cadets throughout the 1950s and most of the 1960s. In 1977 the end of the Vietnam War meant a decrease in the need for Air Force pilots. Webb was formally deactivated, and the property it had occupied was turned over to the Big Spring Industrial Park.

=== Historical airline service ===
American Airlines, first operating as Southern Air Transport, began the first commercial air service to Big Spring in 1929 when the airport was called American Airlines Field through the 1930's. Big Spring was an important fuel stop between El Paso and Dallas for American's transcontinental flights between Los Angeles and New York. American first used early tri-motor aircraft followed by Douglas DC-3's before service ended in 1950.

Continental Airlines began flights in 1944 serving Big Spring as one of many stops on a route between Denver, Albuquerque, and San Antonio. Continental also flew DC-3's but ended service in 1951.

Pioneer Air Lines began service in 1947 using the Municipal Airport (now McMahon-Wrinkle) as one of several stops on flights between Midland/Odessa and Dallas. The airline used Douglas DC-3 aircraft. Pioneer merged into Continental Airlines in 1955 marking a return for Continental. Continental moved its flights to the new Howard County Airport (HCA) northeast of Big Spring in 1960–61.

Trans-Texas Airways (TTa) replaced Continental at HCA in 1963 using DC-3's and soon upgraded to Convair 240 piston engine aircraft and Convair 600 turboprops. Trans-Texas changed its name to Texas International Airlines in 1969. According to its July 1, 1970 system timetable, Texas International (TI) was operating four Convair 600 propjet flights every weekday from the airport with nonstop service to Dallas/Fort Worth, TX, Lubbock, TX, Brownwood, TX and Hobbs, NM as well as direct no change of plane flights to Albuquerque, Clovis, NM, El Dorado, AR, Longview, TX and Santa Fe, NM with service to Albuquerque and Dallas/Fort Worth providing direct connections to TI DC-9 jet flights to Houston, Los Angeles and Little Rock. Texas International then ended service to Big Spring in 1974. A small commuter airline by the name of Trans Regional then offered service from Big Spring to DFW and Midland/Odessa, Texas but their service ended by early 1976 and Big Spring has not seen commercial air service since that time. Howard County Airport closed by 1985 at which time all local aviation moved back to McMahon-Wrinkle Airport.

== Facilities ==
The airport covers 2,086 acres (844 ha) and has two paved runways: 18/36 is 8,802 x 100 ft (2,683 x 30 m) and 6/24 is 4,601 x 75 ft (1,402 x 23 m).

Air traffic coordination is limited to UNICOM advisories only. The former Webb AFB control tower stood until mid 2025, It had not been operational since the Air Force's departure in late 1977 and the airfield's conversion to a civil airport.

In April 2026, Galaxy FBO has taken over the fixed base operations at the field, from the City of Big Spring.

== Other tenants ==
Three units of the Big Spring Correctional Center (a federal prison privately operated by Cornell Companies) are located on the base grounds (as well as FCI Big Spring, a separate facility operated directly by the Bureau of Prisons).

== See also ==
- Texas World War II Army Airfields
- List of airports in Texas
- Galaxy FBO
