= Nrrd =

nrrd
- Filename extension: .nrrd
- Type of format: Image file formats
- Open format?: yes

Nrrd ("nearly raw raster data") is a library and file format for the representation and processing of n-dimensional raster data. It was developed by Gordon Kindlmann to support scientific visualization and image processing applications.

== Utah Nrrd Utilities ==
The command-line tool unu (Utah Nrrd Utilities) is used for the manipulation and management of nrrd files.

unu
- Written in: C
- Operating system: Cross-platform
- Website: teem.sourceforge.net/unrrdu/index.html
