= Webb Air Force Base =

Near Big Spring, Texas

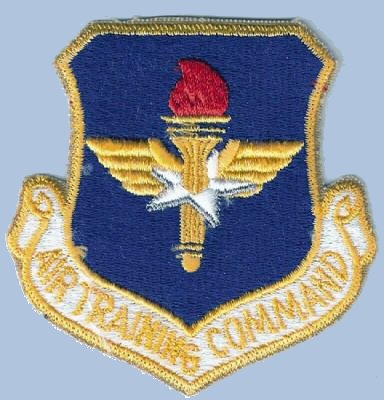
Webb Air Force Base Big Spring Army Airfield
- Part of Air Training Command (ATC)
- Big Spring, Texas, USA
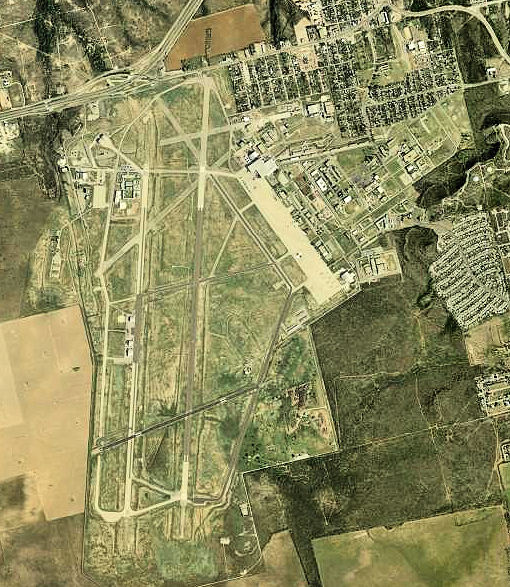
- 2006 USGS photo

Site information
- Type: Air Force Base
- Controlled by: United States Air Force

Location
- Coordinates: 32°13′05″N 101°31′17″W

Site history
- Built: 1942
- In use: Open 1942 – closed 1977

Webb Air Force Base (IATA: BGS), previously named Big Spring Air Force Base, was a United States Air Force facility of the Air Training Command that operated from 1951 to 1977 in West Texas within the current city limits of Big Spring. Webb AFB was a major undergraduate pilot training (UPT) facility for the Air Force, and by 1969, almost 9,000 pilots had been trained at Webb. The last operational wing at Webb AFB was the 78th Flying Training Wing.

== History ==
=== World War II ===
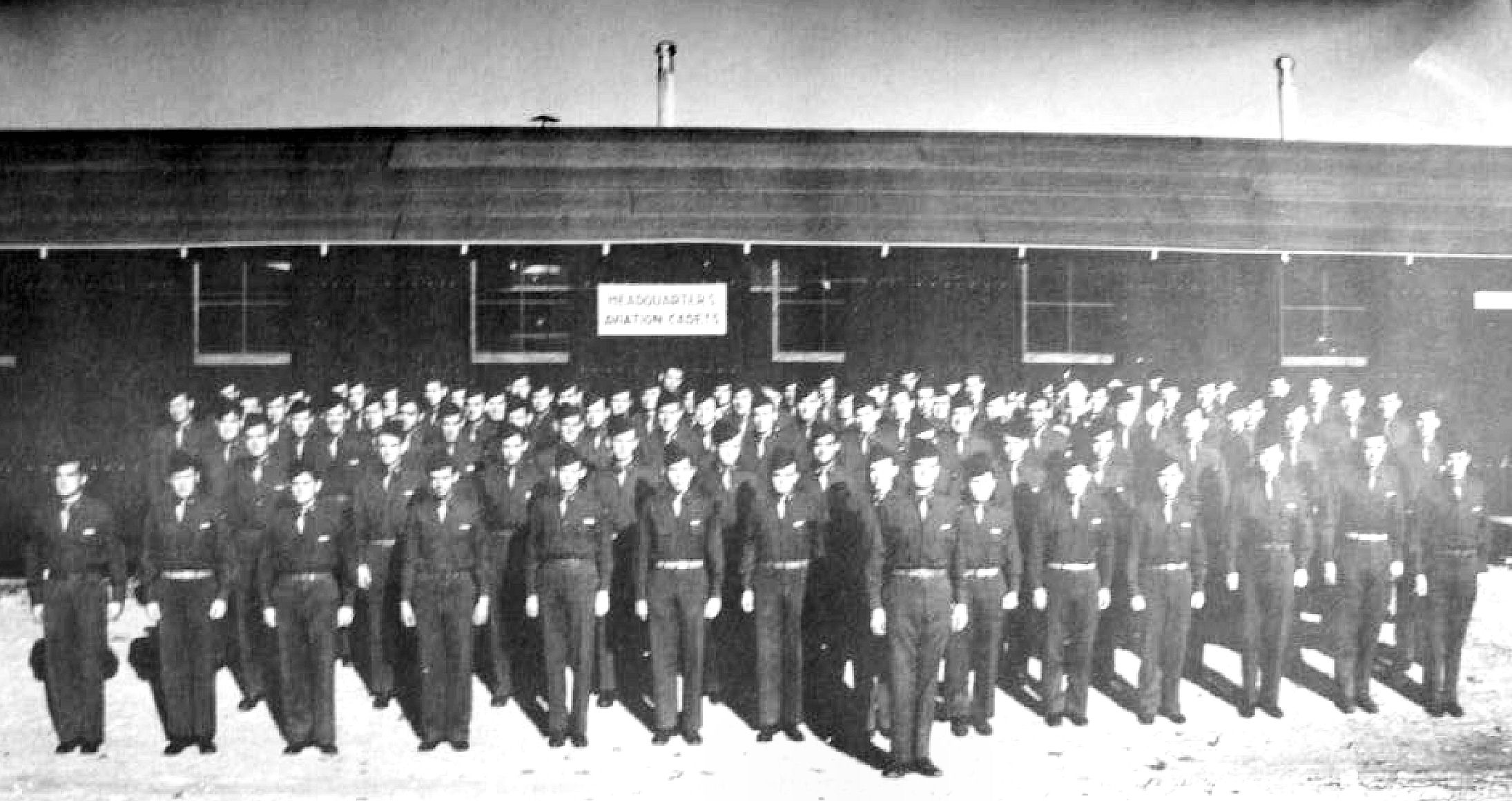
Big Spring Army Airfield - Army Flight School Headquarters Staff 1942

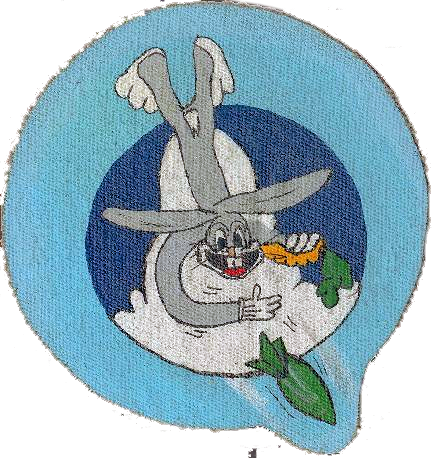
USAAF Bombardier School Big Spring AAF emblem

The facility first was used by the United States Army Air Forces as Big Spring Army Air Field, opening on 28 April 1942 as part of the Central Flying Training Command.

Activated on 26 June 1942, the mission of Big Spring AAF was to train aviation cadets in high-altitude precision bombing as bombardiers. It was one of the "West Texas Bombardier Quadrangle" schools of the Army Air Forces Training Command. The other bases in the quad were Midland Army Airfield, San Angelo Army Airfield, and Childress Army Airfield.

Construction of the Army Air Forces Bombardier School began on 15 May 1942, and the airfield received its first class of cadets (118 men) on 16 September 1942. The 79th Bombardier Training Group was the USAAF instructional unit at Big Spring AAF; the 365th Base Hq and Air Base Squadron maintained the station and commanded the ground support units. Operational squadrons under the 78th BTG were:

- 812nd Bombardier Training Squadron
- 815th Bombardier Training Squadron
- 816th Bombardier Training Squadron
- 817th Bombardier Training Squadron

The base was declared surplus and was turned over to the War Assets Administration after being closed. It eventually reverted to city control, and it served as the Big Spring Municipal Airport for six years.

=== Cold War ===
The airfield was reactivated as Big Spring Air Force Base on 1 October 1951 by the United States Air Force for the Air Training Command (ATC) which established the 3560th Pilot Training Wing (Advanced Single-Engine). However, the command was not formally able to operationally activate the base until 1 January 1952 because the City of Big Spring had difficulty acquiring clear title to some of the property it intended to transfer to ATC

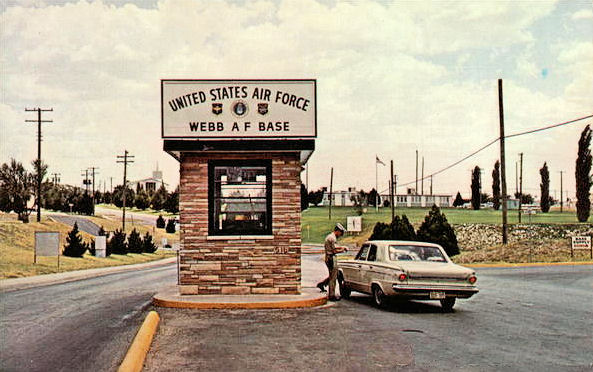
Main Gate at Webb AFB

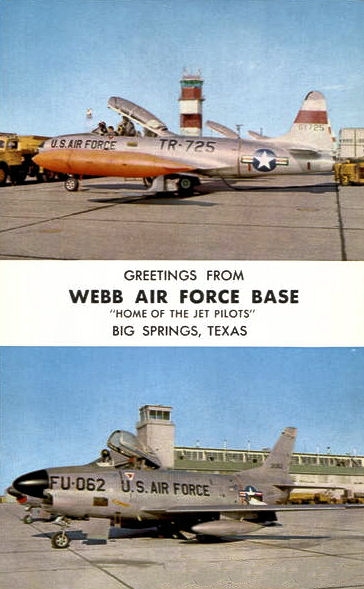
Postcard from Webb showing Lockheed T-33A-1-LO, AF Ser. No. 53-5725, and North American F-86D-60-NA Sabre, AF Ser. No. 53-4062

The facility was brought back into service as a primary training installation because of the Korean War and the need for additional pilots. Four months later, on 18 May 1952, ATC changed the name of Big Spring to Webb Air Force Base to memorialize 1st Lieutenant James L. Webb, a Big Spring native and World War II combat pilot in Europe, who was killed in a mishap off the Japanese coast flying a P-51 Mustang in 1949 during a training mission.

Instruction of the first class began in April 1952. The initial mission of the 3560th PTW was basic, single-engine flight training. The wing was equipped with 37 T-28 Trojan propeller and 28 T-33 Shooting Star jet trainers. The base population soon passed 2,000. With the end of the Korean War, in 1954 ATC reduced its basic single-engine pilot schools from seven to five, this saw the number of students at Webb remain basically the same as the number of new pilots needed was reduced. The propeller-driven T-28 was phased out in 1956 and converted all training to the jet-powered T-33.

In 1956, the Air Defense Command's 331st Fighter-Interceptor Squadron was transferred to Webb AFB from Stewart AFB, New York to defend the southern United States border on air intercept missions as part of the Central Air Defense Force. Originally flying the F-86D Sabre, the squadron upgraded to the F-102 Delta Dagger in 1960, then transitioned to the F-104 Starfighter in 1963. In March 1967, the 331st was redesignated the 4760th Combat Crew Training Squadron and charged with training Royal Jordanian Air Force students on F-104s. It was inactivated on 1 October 1967 when the Jordanians were recalled because of the war with Israel in the summer of 1967.

=== Closure ===
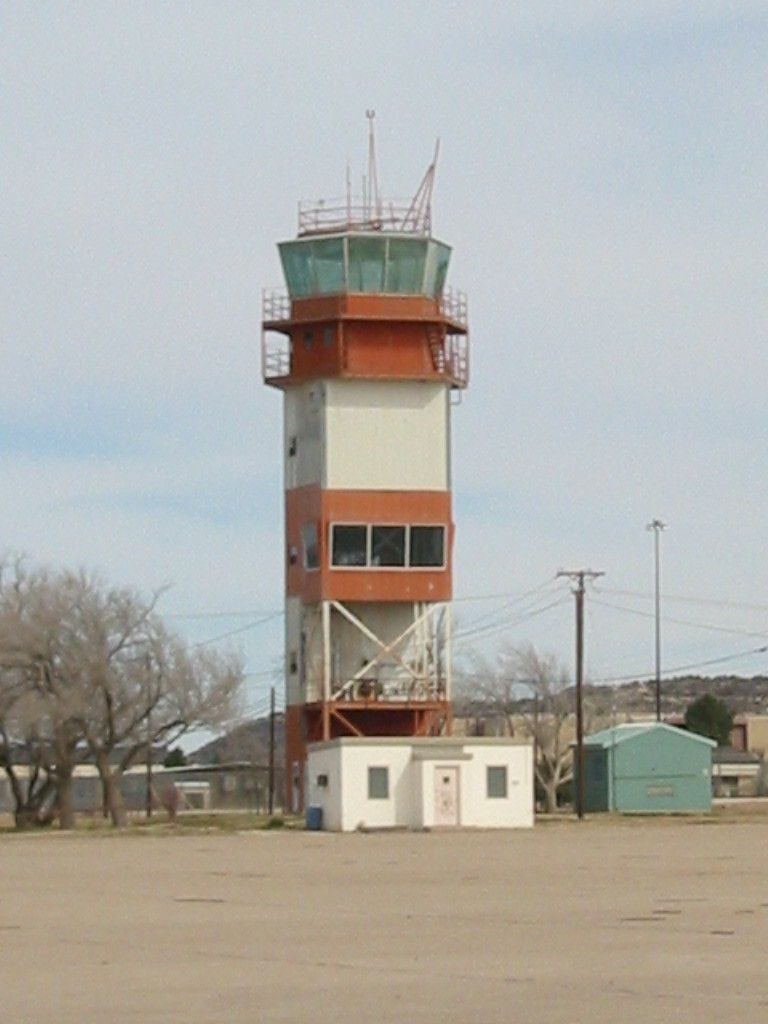
Air Traffic Control Tower at Webb Air Force Base post closure of the base, February 2002

By the mid-1970s, the end of the Vietnam War, the associated financial costs of that conflict and related cuts in USAF force structure and future defense budgets meant a marked decrease in the need for Air Force pilots. One of the major issues facing the ATC commander and his staff during 1976 was the prospect of closing two UPT bases. Rather than reduce training production at all seven locations, ATC officials believed it to be more economical to close two bases. So it was on 11 March 1976 that the Secretary of the Air Force proposed closing several military installations, to include UPT bases Craig AFB, Alabama, and Webb AFB, Texas.

At Webb AFB, the last two pilot training classes completed course work on 30 August 1977, and fixed wing qualification training ended on 1 September 1977. Air Training Command inactivated the 78th Flying Training Wing at Webb AFB on 30 September 1977, although the 78 FTW was subsequently reactivated as the 78th Air Base Wing (78 ABW) at Robins AFB, Georgia, a role it continues in today. The two installations, Webb and Craig were placed in caretaker status the following day. The training previously provided by Webb AFB was moved to Sheppard AFB, Texas, where the first class began on 30 June in what would eventually become Euro-NATO Joint Jet Pilot Training (ENJJPT).

Webb AFB was turned over to the General Services Administration for disposal on 1 January 1978 and the property later turned over to the Big Spring Industrial Park.

The airfield and flight line was converted to an uncontrolled/UNICOM-only general aviation airport renamed Big Spring McMahon-Wrinkle Airport, serving the City of Big Spring. In addition, three units of the Big Spring Correctional Center (a federal prison privately operated by Cornell Companies) are located on the base grounds (as well as FCI Big Spring, which is a separate facility and operated directly by the Federal Bureau of Prisons).

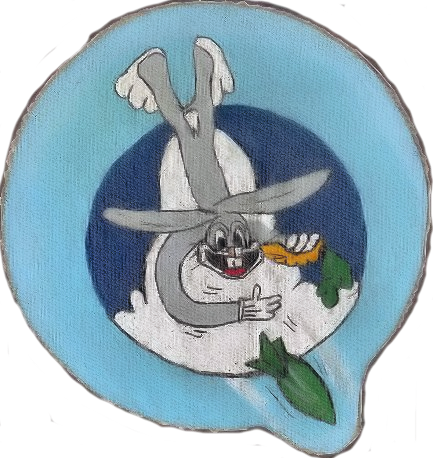
Emblem of the AAF Bombardier School Big Spring AAF

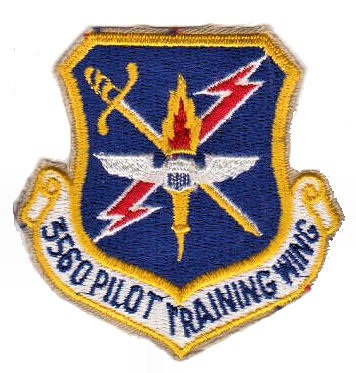
3560th Pilot Training Wing

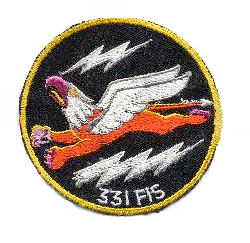
331st Fighter-Interceptor Squadron

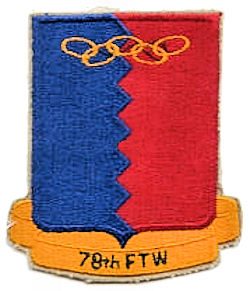
78th Flying Training Wing

== Hangar 25 Air Museum ==
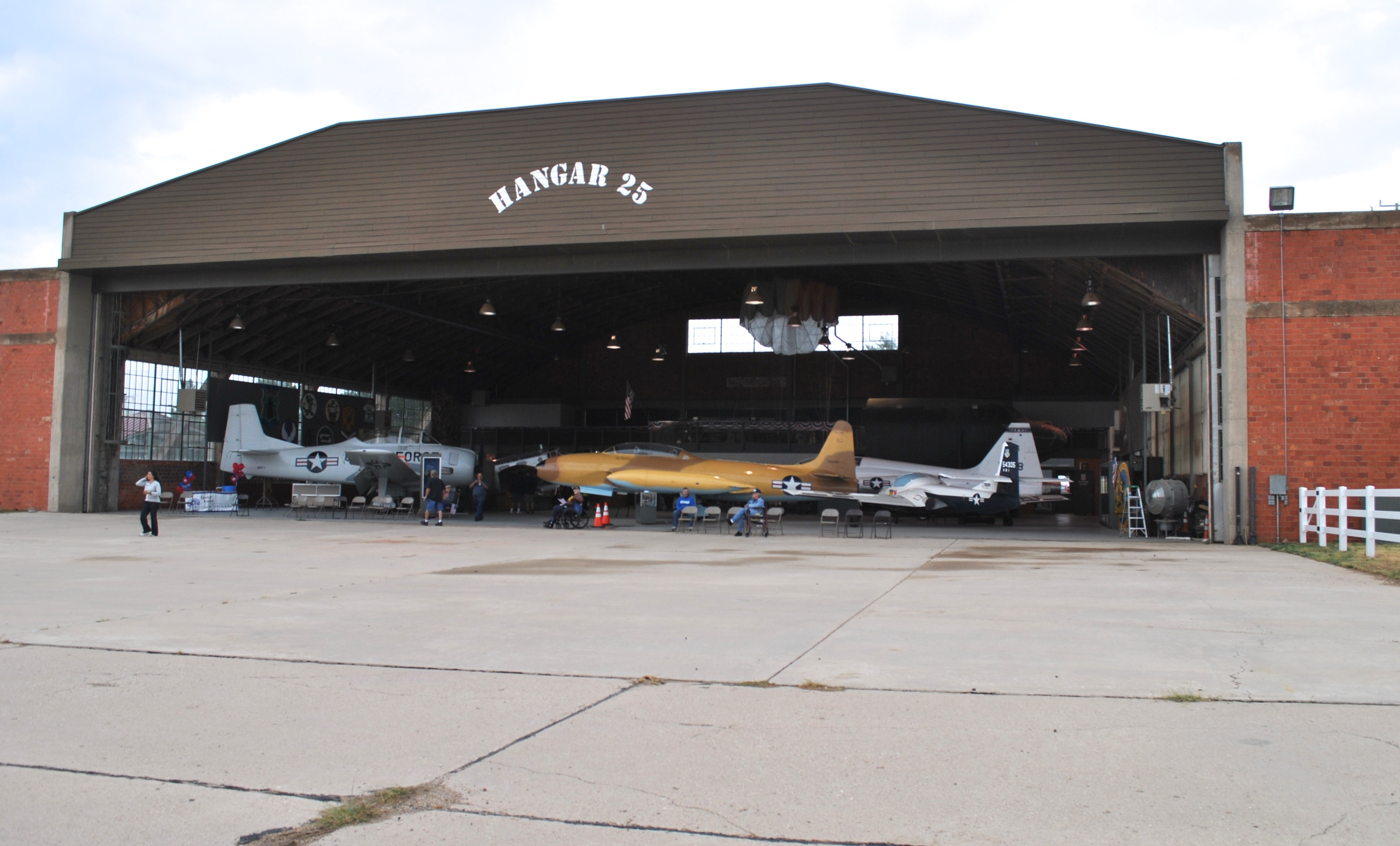
Museum hangar

The Hangar 25 Air Museum is an aviation museum located focused on the history of Webb Air Force Base, and located on the site (now the Big Spring McMahon–Wrinkle Airport). Following the retirement of an assistant city manager in May 1995, Bobby McDonald, a member of the Big Spring Air Park Development Board, proposed preserving one of the World War II-era hangars at the airport. Just over one year later, due to the work of Nelda Reagan, another city official, the newly established Hangar 25 Restoration Committee received a grant from the Texas Department of Transportation to restore Hangar 25. However, shortly thereafter, a storm damaged the roof of the hangar and repairs were deemed too costly. Restoration efforts were refocused on Hangar 44, but the original name of the project was retained.

The 24,000 sq ft (2,200 m^{2}) museum was dedicated on 31 May 1999. Two months before, it received its first two aircraft, a T-33A and a T-37B. It acquired the nose of a B-52 in August and a Harrier the following January.

Solar panels were installed on the west hangar door and the concrete floor was restored in July 2014.

Exhibits include a piece of sidewalk with a drawing of Snoopy and a stained glass window that was originally located in the base chapel.

=== Events ===
The museum holds an annual Silver Wings Ball.

=== Collection ===
==== Aircraft ====
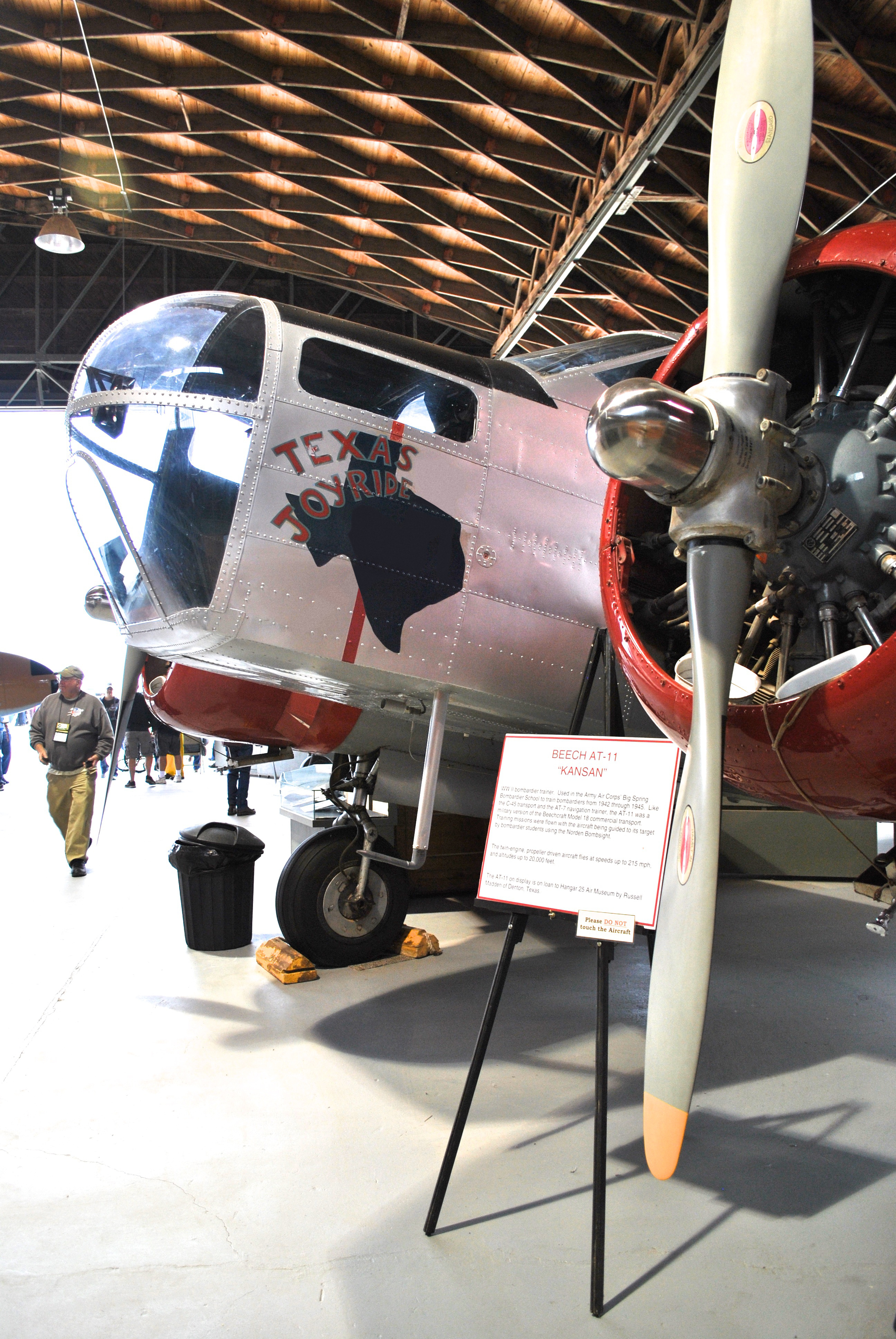
Beechcraft AT-11 Kansan

- Beechcraft AT-11 Kansan
- Boeing B-52G Stratofortress – cockpit
- Cessna T-37B Tweet
- Hawker Siddeley AV-8C Harrier
- Lockheed T-33A
- Lockheed T-33A
- North American F-100F Super Sabre
- North American T-28A Trojan
- Northrop T-38A Talon

==== Ground vehicles ====
- Kaiser M725

== See also ==
- Texas World War II Army Airfields
- 34th Flying Training Wing (World War II)
