= VICAR file format =

Digital image format used by NASA

VICAR is an image file format developed by the NASA's Jet Propulsion Laboratory. It is used to transport images from a variety of space missions including Cassini–Huygens and the Viking Orbiter.
