= Texas World War II Army airfields =

Texas World War II Army Airfields

Site information
- Type: Army Airfields

Location
- Map Of Texas World War II Army Airfields

Site history
- Built: 1940–1944
- In use: 1940–present

During World War II, the United States Army Air Forces established numerous airfields in Texas for training pilots and aircrews. The amount of available land and the temperate climate made Texas a prime location for year-round military training. By the end of the war, 65 Army airfields were built in the state.

== Airfields ==
Name in 1940s	Current name
Abilene Army Air Field	Dyess Air Force Base
Alamo Field	San Antonio International Airport
Aloe Army Air Field	abandoned
Amarillo Army Air Field	Rick Husband Amarillo International Airport
Avenger Army Air Field	Avenger Field
Bergstrom Army Air Field	Austin-Bergstrom International Airport
Big Spring Army Air Field	Big Spring McMahon-Wrinkle Airport
Biggs Field	Biggs Army Airfield
Blackland Army Air Field	Waco Regional Airport
Brooks Field	Brooks Air Force Base (Closed 30 September 2011)
Brownwood Army Air Field	Brownwood Regional Airport
Bryan Army Air Field	Texas A&M Flight Test Station Airport
Caddo Mills Aux#1 (Majors)	Caddo Mills Municipal Airport
Childress Army Air Field	Childress Municipal Airport
Corsicana Field	Corsicana Municipal Airport
Cox Army Air Field	Cox Field
Culver Army Air Field	Leon Valley, Texas
Dalhart Army Air Field	Dalhart Municipal Airport
Dodd Field	Fort Sam Houston
Duncan Field	Kelly Air Force Base
Eagle Pass Army Air Field	Maverick County Memorial International Airport
El Paso Army Air Field	El Paso International Airport
Ellington Field	Ellington Field
Fort Worth Army Air Field	Carswell Field
Foster Field	Victoria Regional Airport
Gainesville Army Air Field	Gainesville Municipal Airport
Galveston Army Air Field	Scholes Field
Goodfellow Field	Goodfellow Air Force Base
Harlingen Army Air Field	Valley International Airport
Hensley Field	Hensley Field
Hondo Army Air Field	Hondo Municipal Airport
Kelly Field	Kelly Air Force Base
Laredo Army Air Field	Laredo International Airport
Laughlin Army Air Field	Laughlin Air Force Base
Love Field	Dallas Love Field
Lubbock Army Air Field	Reese Technology Center
Majors Army Air Field	Majors Airport
Marfa Army Air Field	abandoned
Midland Army Air Field	Midland International Airport
Moore Field	Moore Field Airport
Palacios Army Air Field	Palacios Municipal Airport
Pampa Army Air Field	abandoned
Pecos Army Air Field	Pecos Municipal Airport
Perrin Field	Grayson County Airport
Plainview Army Air Field	Hale County Airport
Pyote Army Air Field	abandoned
Randolph Field	Randolph Air Force Base
San Angelo Army Air Field	Mathis Field
San Marcos Army Air Field	San Marcos Municipal Airport
Sheppard Field	Wichita Falls Municipal Airport
South Plains Army Air Field	Lubbock International Airport
Stinson Army Air Field	Stinson Municipal Airport
Temple Army Air Field	Draughon-Miller Central Texas Regional Airport
Tyler Army Air Field	Tyler Pounds Field
Waco Army Air Field	TSTC Waco Airport

== See also ==
- Western Flying Training Command
