= Gainesville Municipal Airport =

Airport in Cooke County, Texas

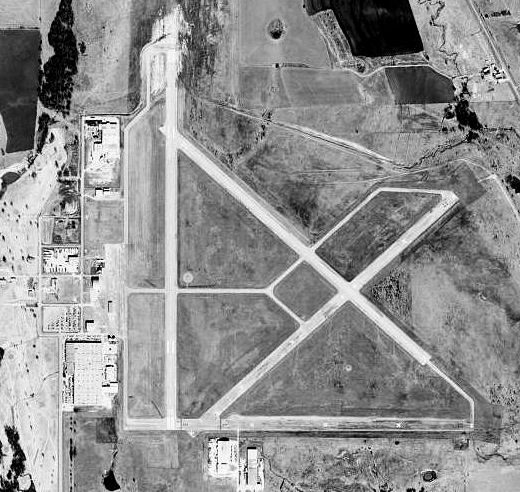
- IATA: GLE; ICAO: KGLE; FAA LID: GLE

Summary
- Airport type: Public
- Owner: City of Gainesville
- Serves: Gainesville, Texas
- Elevation AMSL: 845 ft (258 m)
- Coordinates: 33°39′05″N 97°11′49″W

Map
- Location within Texas

Runways
Direction	Length		Surface
Direction	ft	m	Surface
13/31	4,307	1,313	Asphalt
18/36	6,000	1,829	Asphalt

Statistics (2022)
- Aircraft operations (year ending 9/16/2022): 24,300
- Based aircraft: 91
- Source: Federal Aviation Administration

Gainesville Municipal Airport (IATA: GLE, ICAO: KGLE, FAA LID: GLE) is three miles west of Gainesville, in Cooke County, Texas.

== History ==
The airport opened in August 1941 as Gainesville Army Airfield and was used by the United States Army Air Forces Third Air Force as a training base to provide photographic intelligence for air and ground forces.

Known units which trained at Gainesville were the 8th and 426th Reconnaissance Groups. They flew a variety of aircraft, including the P-38 Lightning (F-5), P-51 Mustang (F-6), B-24 Liberator (F-7) and P-40 Warhawk.

The 8th Reconnaissance group was deployed to India in 1944 to support 10th and 14th Air Forces in the China-Burma-India (CBI) Theater.

Reassigned from Third Air Force in April 1944 to AAF Central Flying Training Command. Hosted AAF Pilot School (Advanced, Single Engine). At the end of the war the airfield was determined to be excess by the military and turned over to the local government for civil use.

For a year or two around 1951 Gainesville had scheduled airline flights—Central DC-3s.

== Facilities ==
The airport covers 1,336 acres (541 ha) and has two asphalt runways: 18/36 is 6,000 x 100 ft (1,829 x 30 m) and 13/31 is 4,307 x 75 ft (1,313 x 23 m).

In the year ending September 16, 2022, the airport had 24,300 aircraft operations, average 67 per day: 100% general aviation and <1% military. 91 aircraft were then based at this airport: 73 single-engine, 10 multi-engine, 7 jet, and 1 helicopter.

Since at least 2006, the Aviatian Traders ATL-98 Carvair, tailnumber N89FA (a.k.a. "Miss 1944") has been based at Gainesville. It is one of 22 modified DC-4 airframes and was seen in the James Bond movie, Goldfinger.

== See also ==
- Texas World War II Army Airfields
- List of airports in Texas
