= XVL =

File format for 3D computer graphics data

XVL is a lightweight 3D file format for 3D computer graphics data. XVL is developed by Lattice Technology Inc. Like U3D and other open and standard 3D formats, XVL supports compression of 3D data. The company claims compression rates of between 1:50 - 1: 200 for typical mesh objects. After a registration, a closed source, Windows only, viewer for XVL files can be downloaded from the company site.

== See also ==
- U3D – an ECMA standard open format for 3D data that supports compression.
- glTF - a Khronos Group file format for 3D Scenes and models.
