= XVRML =

File format for representing 3-dimensional (3D) interactive computer graphics

xVRML (eXtensible Virtual Reality Modeling Language, usually pronounced ex-vermal) is a standard file format for representing 3-dimensional (3D) interactive computer graphics, designed particularly with the World Wide Web in mind.

== Format ==
xVRML is a text-file format from the xVRML Project at RIT. While xVRML evolved from VRML; it now has an easy-to-learn, XML-based syntax, for which it utilizes an XML Schema to insure both a clear structure and understandable constraints.

== Downloads ==
The specifications, documentation, and example files, as well as information about a viewer application (Carina), may all be found at the xVRML Project website. All but the examples may be downloaded from the Project SourceForge site. An extensive and growing object library is available for public use through the xVRML Project site.
