= Graphics Layout Engine =

Graphics programming language

GLE
- Stable release: 4.3.5 / February 7, 2025; 6 months ago
- Repository: github.com/vlabella/GLE
- Written in: C++
- Platform: Cross-platform
- License: BSD / GPL
- Website: glx.sourceforge.io

Graphics Layout Engine (GLE) is a graphics scripting language designed for creating publication quality graphs, plots, diagrams, figures and slides. GLE supports various graph types such as function plots, histograms, bar graphs, scatter plots, contour lines, color maps and surface plots through a simple but flexible set of graphing commands. More complex output can be created by relying on GLE's scripting language, which is full featured with subroutines, variables, and logic control. GLE relies on LaTeX for text output and supports mathematical formula in graphs and figures. GLE's output formats include EPS, PS, PDF, JPEG, and PNG.

The GLE software dates back to the early 1990s and it is still under active development. Currently, GLE development is hosted on GitHub.

== Platforms ==
GLE is available for all major operating systems including Microsoft Windows, Mac OS X, and Unix. It is included in Linux distributions such as Debian, Fedora, and SUSE.

== License ==
GLE is licensed under the BSD license. QGLE, the GLE user interface, is licensed under the GPL license.

== See also ==
- Asymptote
- Gnuplot
- Tikz
- List of graphing software
