= Drawn File =

- Filename extension: .drw

A drawn file is a type of file used to preserve image drawings. The filename extension for this is .drawn, .drawing, or, for computers that only support three-letter extensions, .drw.

== Programs ==
According to FileInfo.net, files with a .drw extension can be opened by the following programs:

=== Mac OS ===
- Apple AppleWorks

=== Windows ===
- Microsoft Picture It!
- CorelDRAW
- Corel Paint Shop Pro
