= 78th Flying Training Wing (U.S. Army Air Forces) =

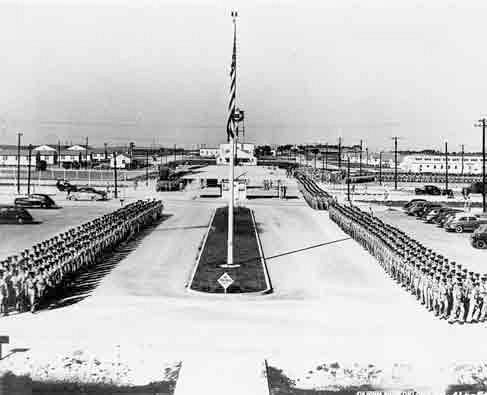
- Cadets march through the main gate at the San Antonio Aviation Cadet Center. In the early 1940s,
- Active: 1943–1945
- Country: United States
- Branch: United States Army Air Forces
- Type: Command and Control
- Role: Training
- Part of: Army Air Forces Training Command
- Engagements: World War II: World War II American Theater

Commanders
- Notable commanders: BG M. F. Davis, 25 August 1943; Col Robert E. M. Goolrick, 1 May 1945-c. 30 June 1945.

The 78th Flying Training Wing was a wing of the United States Army Air Forces. It was last assigned to the Central Flying Training Command, and was disbanded on 30 June 1945 at the San Antonio Aviation Cadet Center, Texas.

The wing was a World War II unit for the classification and preflight testing of aviation cadets. It was one of three such centers, the others being at Maxwell Field, Alabama and Santa Ana Army Air Base, California.

There is no lineage between the current United States Air Force 78th Air Base Wing, established on 24 September 1948 at Hamilton Air Force Base, California, and this organization.

== History ==
The mission of the wing was to provide both Classification and Preflight stage training to air cadets which had completed Training Command basic indoctrination training.

- Classification Stage processed the cadet and issued him his equipment. This was the stage where it would be decided whether the cadet would train as a navigator, bombardier, or pilot.
- Pre-Flight Stage taught the mechanics and physics of flight and required the cadets to pass courses in mathematics and the hard sciences. Then the cadets were taught to apply their knowledge practically by teaching them aeronautics, deflection shooting, and thinking in three dimensions.

Once the cadet successfully completed the training at the center, they would be assigned to one of the AAF primary flight schools for initial flying training.

=== Lineage ===
- Established as 78th Flying Training Wing on 14 August 1943

Activated on 25 August 1943
Disbanded on 30 June 1945

=== Assignments ===
- Army Air Forces Central Flying Training Command, 25 August 1943 – 30 June 1945

=== Units ===
- Army Air Forces Classification Center, 30 April 1942 – 1 May 1944

885th Classification Center Squadron, 4 July 1942
886th Classification Center Squadron, 4 July 1942
888th Classification Center Squadron, 4 July 1942

Squadrons re-designated as squadrons "E", "F", "G", 2535th AAFBU, 1 May 1944

- Army Air Forces Preflight School (Pilot), 30 April 1942

Re-designated: 330th Training Group, 17 August 1942 – 1 May 1944

881st Preflight Training Squadron, 4 July 1942
882d Preflight Training Squadron, 4 July 1942
883d Preflight Training Squadron, 4 July 1942
884th Preflight Training Squadron, 4 July 1942

Squadrons re-designated as squadrons "A", "B", "C", "D", 2535th AAFBU, 1 May 1944

- 2535th Army Air Forces Base Unit, 1 May 1944 – 30 June 1945
- Kelly Field, San Antonio, Texas

AAF Pilot School (Advanced, Two-Engine) June 1941 – March 1943 (AT-9, AT-10)

61st*, 62d*, 63d*, 64th*, 389th, 390th, 1028th, 1048th, 1097th, 1098th, 1099th Two-Engine Flying Training Squadrons

Flying training ended at Kelly, March 1943, base was transferred to Air Service Command

- Duncan Field, San Antonio, Texas

AAF Pilot School (Basic) Jan 1942 – Feb 1943 (BT-9, BT-13)

492d, 667th, 1029th, 1030th Basic Flying Training Squadrons

Duncan Field merged into Kelly Field, March 1943

*Squadrons formed on 1 September 1936 as part of the Air Corps Primary Flying School detachment at Kelly Field; 61st (Pursuit); 62d (Observation); 63d (Attack); 64th (Bombardment); re-designated Two-Engine squadrons 16 June 1941

=== Stations ===
- San Antonio Aviation Cadet Center, Texas, 25 August 1943 – 30 June 1945

== See also ==
- Army Air Forces Training Command
- Other Training Command Preflight/classification Units:

74th Flying Training Wing (World War II) Eastern Flying Training Command
81st Flying Training Wing (World War II) Western Flying Training Command

- Other Central Flying Training Command Flight Training Wings:

31st Flying Training Wing (World War II) Primary Flight Training
32d Flying Training Wing (World War II) Basic Flight Training
33d Flying Training Wing (World War II) Advanced Flight Training, Two Engine
34th Flying Training Wing (World War II) Bombardier and Specialized Two/Four-Engine Training
77th Flying Training Wing (World War II) Advanced Flight Training, Single Engine
79th Flying Training Wing (World War II) Gunnery
80th Flying Training Wing (World War II) Navigation and Glider
