= 74th Flying Training Wing (U.S. Army Air Forces) =

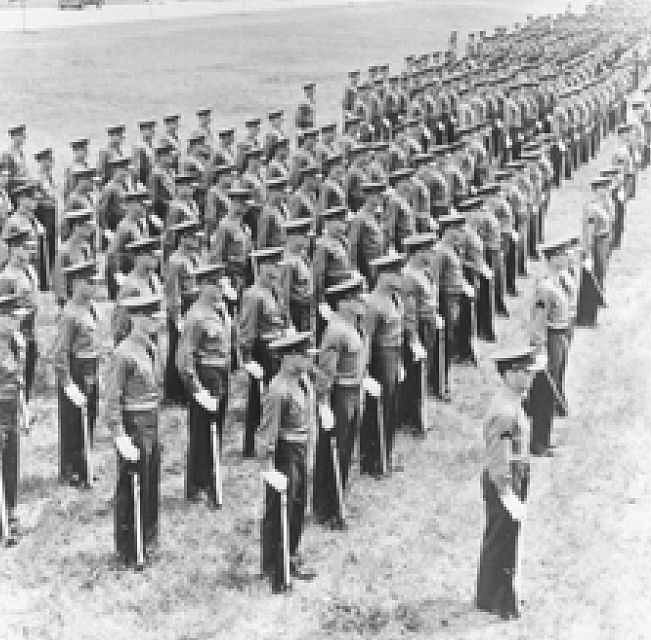
- Cadets being drilled at Maxwell Field in the early 1940s,
- Active: 1943–1945
- Country: United States
- Branch: United States Army Air Forces
- Type: Command and Control
- Role: Training
- Part of: Army Air Forces Training Command
- Engagements: World War II: World War II American Theater

Commanders
- Notable commanders: Maj Gen T. J. Hanley Jr., 16 September 1943; Col Elmer J. Bowling, 27 Nov 1943-at least Nov 1944

The 74th Flying Training Wing was wing of the United States Army Air Forces. It was last assigned to the Eastern Flying Training Command, and was disbanded on 30 December 1945 at Maxwell Field, Alabama.

The wing's mission was to provide classification and preflight testing of aviation cadets. It was one of three such centers, the others being at Maxwell Field, Alabama and Santa Ana Army Air Base, California.

== History ==
The mission of the wing was to provide both Classification and Preflight stage training to air cadets which had completed Training Command basic indoctrination training.

- Classification Stage processed the cadet and issued him his equipment. This was the stage where it would be decided whether the cadet would train as a navigator, bombardier, or pilot.
- Pre-Flight Stage taught the mechanics and physics of flight and required the cadets to pass courses in mathematics and the hard sciences. Then the cadets were taught to apply their knowledge practically by teaching them aeronautics, deflection shooting, and thinking in three dimensions.

Once the cadet successfully completed the training at the center, they would be assigned to one of the AAF primary flight schools for initial flying training.

The wing also provided specialized flight training for foreign pilots as well as a navigation school at Selman, Louisiana that encompassed the entire range of training from preflight ground school to advanced navigation training.

=== Lineage ===
- Established as 74th Flying Training Wing on 14 August 1943

Activated on 30 December 1943
Disbanded on 1 November 1945

=== Assignments ===
- Army Air Forces Eastern Flying Training Command, 25 August 1943 – 30 June 1945

=== Units ===
- Maxwell Field, Montgomery, Alabama

Army Air Forces Classification Center, 25 April 1942 – 7 July 1942
1176th Preflight Training Squadron, 1 March 1943-29 February 1944
AAF Flying School
Opened August 1940 for Free French Pilots (Basic, BT-13). Transferred to Gunter Field, Gunter 1941 and began Advanced, Single-Engine school for basic graduates from Gunter. Flight training ended December 1945

- Gunter Field, Montgomery, Alabama

AAF Flying School (Basic)
86th Basic Flying Training Group
Opened: 1941 Closed: December 1945 (BT-13, BT-4)
Basic training for Free French Pilots

- Selman Army Airfield, Monroe, Louisiana

3d Preflight Training Group (Bombardier/Navigation)
AAF Navigation School
41st, 42d Navigation Training Groups
Opened: August 1942, Closed: December 1945 (AT-7, BT-13, A-28)
Selman AAF was unique as it was only at Selman that a cadet could get his entire training (pre-flight, and advanced), and wind up with a commission and navigators wings without ever leaving the field. Women Airforce Service Pilots (WASP) squadrons were assigned to Selman AAF to provide navigational flying to train cadets

=== Stations ===
- Maxwell Field, Alabama, 16 September 1943 – 30 December 1945

== See also ==
- Army Air Forces Training Command
- Other Training Command Preflight/classification Units:

78th Flying Training Wing (World War II) Central Flying Training Command
81st Flying Training Wing (World War II) Western Flying Training Command

- Other Eastern Flying Training Command Flight Training Wings:

27th Flying Training Wing (World War II) Basic Flight Training
28th Flying Training Wing (World War II) Advanced Flight Training, Single-Engine
29th Flying Training Wing (World War II) Primary Flight Training
30th Flying Training Wing (World War II) Advanced Flight Training, Two Engine
75th Flying Training Wing (World War II) Gunnery
76th Flying Training Wing (World War II) Specialized Four-Engine Training
