= 77th Flying Training Wing =

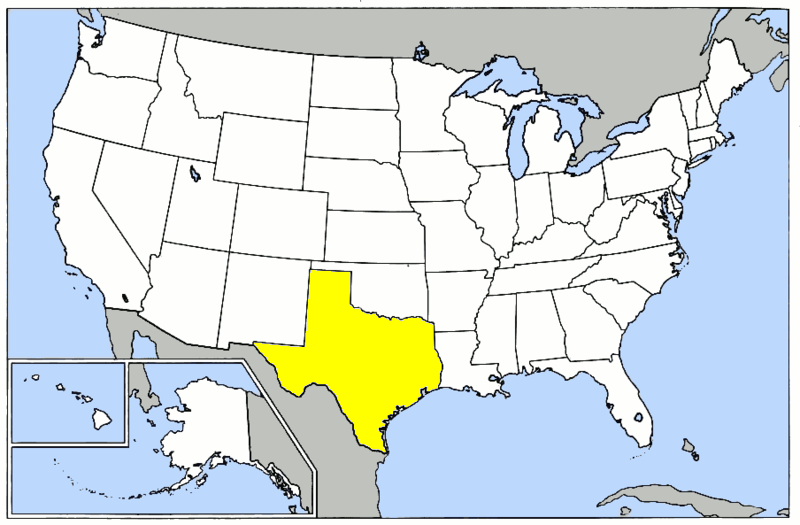
- Locations of airfields controlled by the 77th Flying Training Wing
- Active: 1943–1946
- Country: United States
- Branch: United States Army Air Forces
- Type: Command and Control
- Role: Training
- Part of: Army Air Forces Training Command
- Engagements: World War II: World War II American Theater

The 77th Flying Training Wing was a wing of the United States Army Air Forces. It was assigned to the Central Flying Training Command, and was based in Texas between 1943 and its disbandment on 16 June 1946.

There is no lineage between the United States Air Force 77th Aeronautical Systems Wing, established on 5 February 1942 as the 77th Observation Group at Salinas Army Air Base, California, and this organization.

== History ==
On 14 August 1943, the wing was established at Foster Army Airfield, Texas. It directed Flight Schools in South Texas. The schools provided phase III advanced flying training for Air Cadets, along with advanced single-engine transition training for experienced pilots for reassignment to other flying units. Air Cadet graduates of the advanced schools were commissioned as Second Lieutenants, received their "wings" and were reassigned to First Air Force, Second Air Force, Third Air Force, or Fourth Air Force operational or Replacement Training Units in the Zone of the Interior (the continental United States).

As training requirements changed during the war, schools were activated and inactivated or transferred to meet those requirements. The wing headquarters was moved to Bryan Army Airfield in March 1945, and disbanded there in June 1946.

=== Lineage ===
- Established as 77th Flying Training Wing on 14 August 1943

Activated on 25 August 1943
Disbanded on 16 June 1946 .

=== Assignments ===
- Army Air Forces Central Flying Training Command, 25 August 1943 – 16 June 1946

=== Training aircraft ===
The schools of the wing used primarily the North American AT-6 as their single-engine advanced trainer. Also some Bell P-39s, Curtiss P-40s and North American P-51s were used for transition training. :

=== Assigned Schools ===
Aloe Army Airfield, Victoria, Texas
AAF Pilot School (Advanced Single Engine), also SE Transition School
61st Single Engine Flying Training Group
Opened: December 1942, Closed: November 1945 (AT-6, P-47)
Aircraft carried fuselage code "(Suffix)W" Sub-Field of Foster Army Airfield; had at least ten auxiliary airfields

Bryan Army Air Base, Bryan, Texas
AAF Instructors' School (Instrument Pilot)
Opened: January 1943, Closed: November 1945 (AT-6)
Had 3 auxiliary airfields; Base closed 1947; reactivated in 1951 as Bryan Air Force Base closed 1958

Eagle Pass Army Airfield, Eagle Pass, Texas
AAF Pilot School (Advanced Single Engine)
57th Single Engine Flying Training Group
Opened: October 1942, Closed: May 1945 (AT-6)
Aircraft carried fuselage code "EP"; had at least three auxiliary airfields

Foster Field, Victoria, Texas
AAF Pilot School (Advanced Single Engine), also SE Transition School
62d Single Engine Flying Training Group
79th Bombardier Training Group
Opened: October 1941, Closed: October 1945 (AT-6, P-40, P-47, P-51)
Aircraft carried fuselage code "(Suffix)Y" had at least five auxiliary airfields; Closed 1945; became Foster Air Force Base in 1952, closed 1955.

Matagorda Peninsula Army Airfield, Matagorda Island, Texas
AAF Pilot School (Advanced Single Engine Transition)
Opened: July 1942, Closed: April 1945 (AT-6, P-40, P-47, P-51)
Aircraft carried fuselage code "P"; Sub-Field of Foster Army Airfield; Now Pierce Airfield

Moore Field, Mission, Texas
AAF Pilot School (Advanced Single Engine), also SE Transition School
Opened: November 1942, Closed: December 1945 (AT-6, P-39, P-40)
had at least four auxiliary airfields

=== Stations ===
- Foster Army Airfield, Texas, 25 August 1943
- Bryan Army Air Base, Texas, 26 March 1945 – 16 June 1946

== See also ==
- Army Air Forces Training Command
- Other Central Flying Training Command Flight Training Wings:

31st Flying Training Wing (World War II) Primary Flight Training
32d Flying Training Wing (World War II) Basic Flight Training
33d Flying Training Wing (World War II) Advanced Flight Training, Two Engine
34th Flying Training Wing (World War II) Bombardier and Specialized Two/Four-Engine Training
78th Flying Training Wing (World War II) Classification/Preflight Unit
79th Flying Training Wing (World War II) Gunnery
80th Flying Training Wing (World War II) Navigation and Glider
