= Aloe, Texas =

Aloe
- Unincorporated community
- Location within the state of Texas Aloe (the United States)
- Coordinates: 28°46′00″N 97°04′34″W
- Country: United States
- State: Texas
- County: Victoria
- Elevation: 105 ft (32 m)
- Time zone: UTC-6 (Central (CST))
  - Summer (DST): UTC-5 (CDT)
- Area code: 361
- GNIS feature ID: 1351041

Aloe is an unincorporated community in Victoria County, Texas, United States. The community is located along U.S. Route 59, 5 miles (8.0 km) southwest of Victoria. The community was established in 1889, when the Gulf, Western Texas & Pacific Railroad built a line through the area; it was named for the abundance of local yucca plants. Aloe Army Airfield opened in the community during World War II; after the war, it operated as Victoria County Airport until 1960.
