= 80th Flying Training Wing (U.S. Army Air Forces) =

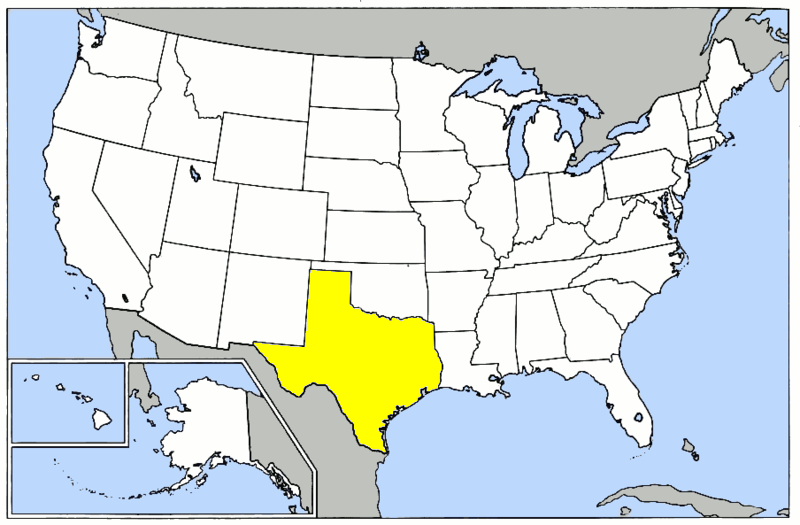
- Locations of airfields controlled by the 80th Flying Training Wing
- Active: 1943–1946
- Country: United States
- Branch: United States Army Air Forces
- Type: Command and Control
- Role: Training
- Part of: Army Air Forces Training Command
- Engagements: World War II: World War II American Theater

The 80th Flying Training Wing was a training wing of the United States Army Air Forces. It was last assigned to the Central Flying Training Command, and was disbanded on 16 June 1946 at Ellington Field, Texas.

There is no lineage between the United States Air Force 80th Flying Training Wing, established on 13 January 1942 as the 80th Pursuit Group (Interceptor) at Selfridge Field, Michigan and this organization.

== History ==
The wing controlled three navigation schools in Texas, and also supported the AAF Glider Pilot School at South Plains. After graduation, Flying Cadets were commissioned as Second Lieutenants, received their "wings" and were reassigned to Operational or Replacement Training Units operated by one of the four Numbered Air Forces in the Zone of Interior (ZI).

=== Lineage ===
- Established as 80th Flying Training Wing on 14 August 1943

Activated on 25 August 1943
Disbanded on 16 June 1946.

=== Assignments ===
- Army Air Forces Central Flying Training Command, 25 August 1943 – 16 June 1946.

=== Training aircraft ===
The schools of the wing used Beechcraft AT-7s for navigation training. Glider training focused on the Waco CG-4A, along with various tow planes to get the gliders airborne.

=== Assigned Schools ===
Ellington Field, Houston, Texas
AAF Advanced Navigation School
68th Navigation Training Group
Opened: January 1942, Closed: November 1945 (AT-7)
Remained open after the war as Ellington AFB, closed 1976, now TX ANG base

Hondo Army Air Field, Hondo, Texas
AAF Advanced Navigation School
87th Navigation Training Group
Opened: July 1942, Closed: December 1945 (AT-7)
Closed December 1945; opened 1951. Later Hondo Air Base, closed 1958; still used for flight screening program

San Marcos Army Airfield, San Marcos, Texas
AAF Advanced Navigation School
Opened: January 1943, Closed: September 1945 (AT-7)
Reopened 1951 as Gary Air Force Base. Closed 1963

South Plains Army Airfield, Lubbock, Texas
AAF Glider School
64th Two-Engine Flying Training Group
Opened: August 1942, Closed: November 1944 (A-25, AT-17, CG-4, L-4, TG-1, TG-5)

=== Stations ===
- San Marcos Army Airfield, Texas, 25 August 1943
- Ellington Field, Texas, 1 January 1945 – 16 June 1946

== See also ==
- Army Air Forces Training Command
- Other Central Flying Training Command Flight Training Wings:

31st Flying Training Wing (World War II) Primary Flight Training
32d Flying Training Wing (World War II) Basic Flight Training
33d Flying Training Wing (World War II) Advanced Flight Training, Two Engine
34th Flying Training Wing (World War II) Bombardier and Specialized Two/Four-Engine Training
77th Flying Training Wing (World War II) Advanced Flight Training, Single Engine
78th Flying Training Wing (World War II) Classification/Preflight Unit
79th Flying Training Wing (World War II) Gunnery
