= Waco Regional Airport =

Airport in Texas

Waco Regional Airport Blackland AAF
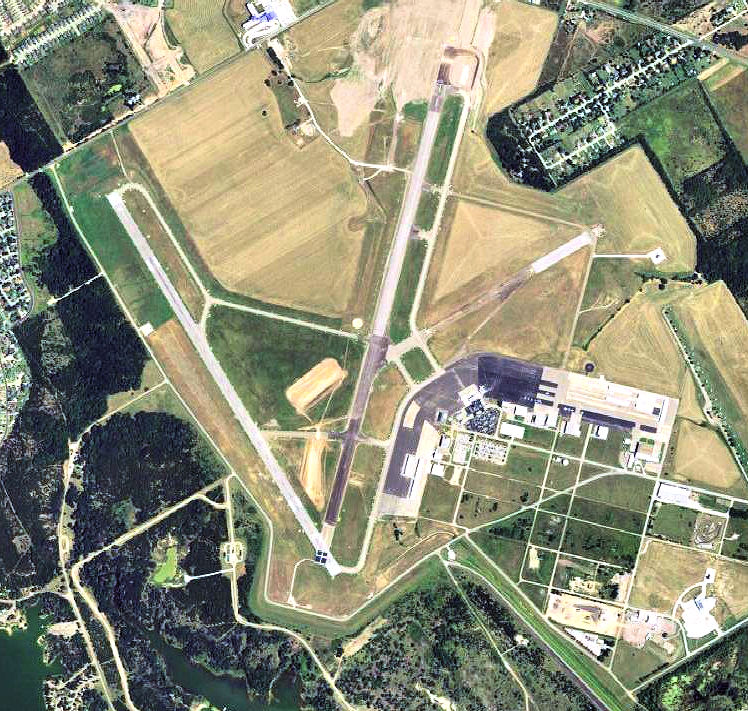
- 2008 USGS airphoto
- IATA: ACT; ICAO: KACT; FAA LID: ACT; WMO: 72256

Summary
- Airport type: Public
- Owner: City of Waco
- Serves: Waco, Texas
- Elevation AMSL: 516 ft (157 m)
- Coordinates: 31°36′41″N 097°13′50″W
- Website: www.waco-texas.com/airport/

Map
- Location within Texas Location within the United States

Runways
Direction	Length		Surface
Direction	ft	m	Surface
01/19	7,107	2,166	Asphalt
14/32	5,103	1,555	Asphalt

Statistics (2022)
- Aircraft operations (year ending 6/30/2022): 66,191
- Based aircraft: 74
- Source: Federal Aviation Administration

Waco Regional Airport (IATA: ACT, ICAO: KACT, FAA LID: ACT) is an airport in Waco, McLennan County, Texas. It is owned by the City of Waco.

The airport is a 15-20 minute drive from downtown and central Waco.

== Facilities ==
Waco Regional Airport covers 1,369 acres (554 ha) and has two asphalt runways: 1/19 is 7,107 x 150 ft and 14/32 is 5,103 x 150 ft.

In the year ending June 30, 2022, the airport had 66,191 aircraft operations, averaging 181 per day: 83% general aviation, 10% military, 7% air taxi, and <1% airline. 74 aircraft at that time were based at the airport: 52 single-engine, 13 multi-engine, 3 jet and 6 helicopter.

The airport has 2 jetways with 3 gates in use, with Envoy Air and SkyWest Airlines service to Dallas/Fort Worth International Airport. The Aerodrome Cafe is located inside the terminal building.

Beyond commercial service, Waco Regional Airport supports flight training, private aviation, and aircraft services. Texas Aero serves as the airport's primary full-service fixed-base operator (FBO). The airport also hosts multiple flight schools and the Baylor University Flight Center which supports Baylor University's Aviation Sciences program.

== History ==
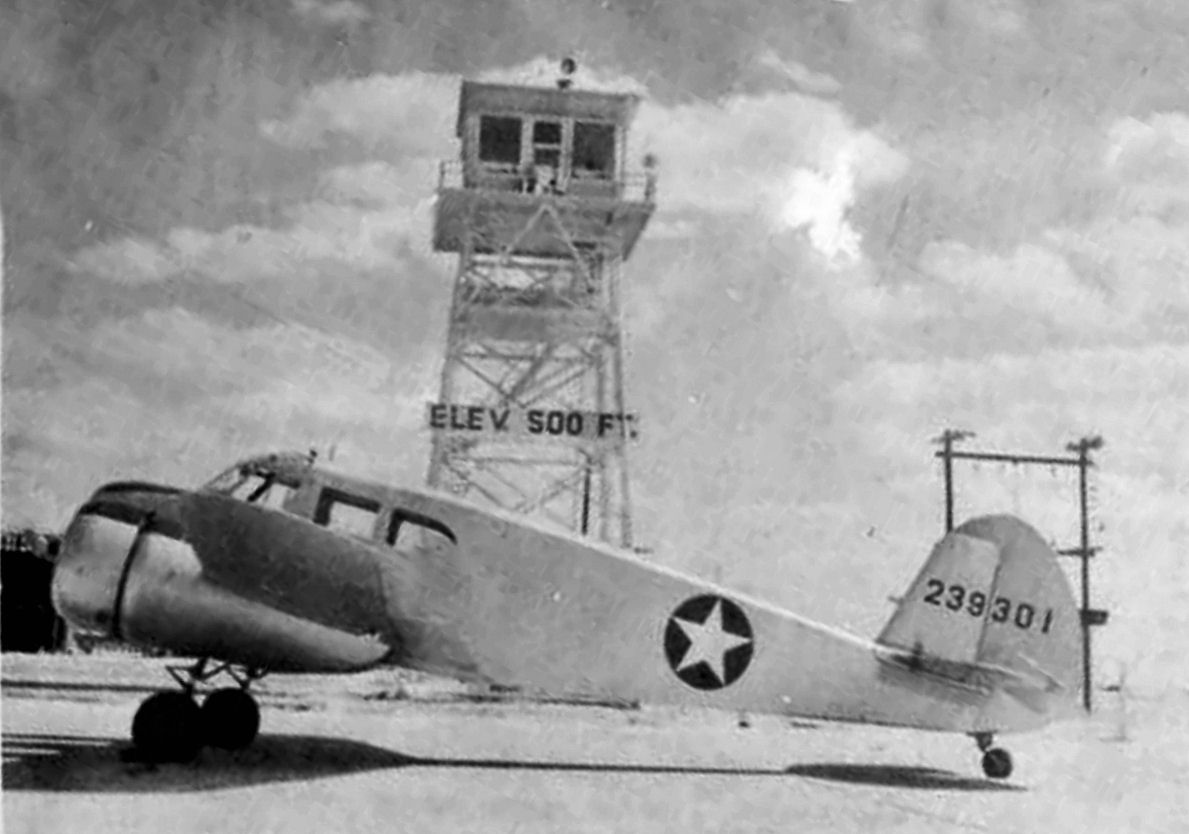
Control tower and Beechcraft AT-10 Wichita trainer

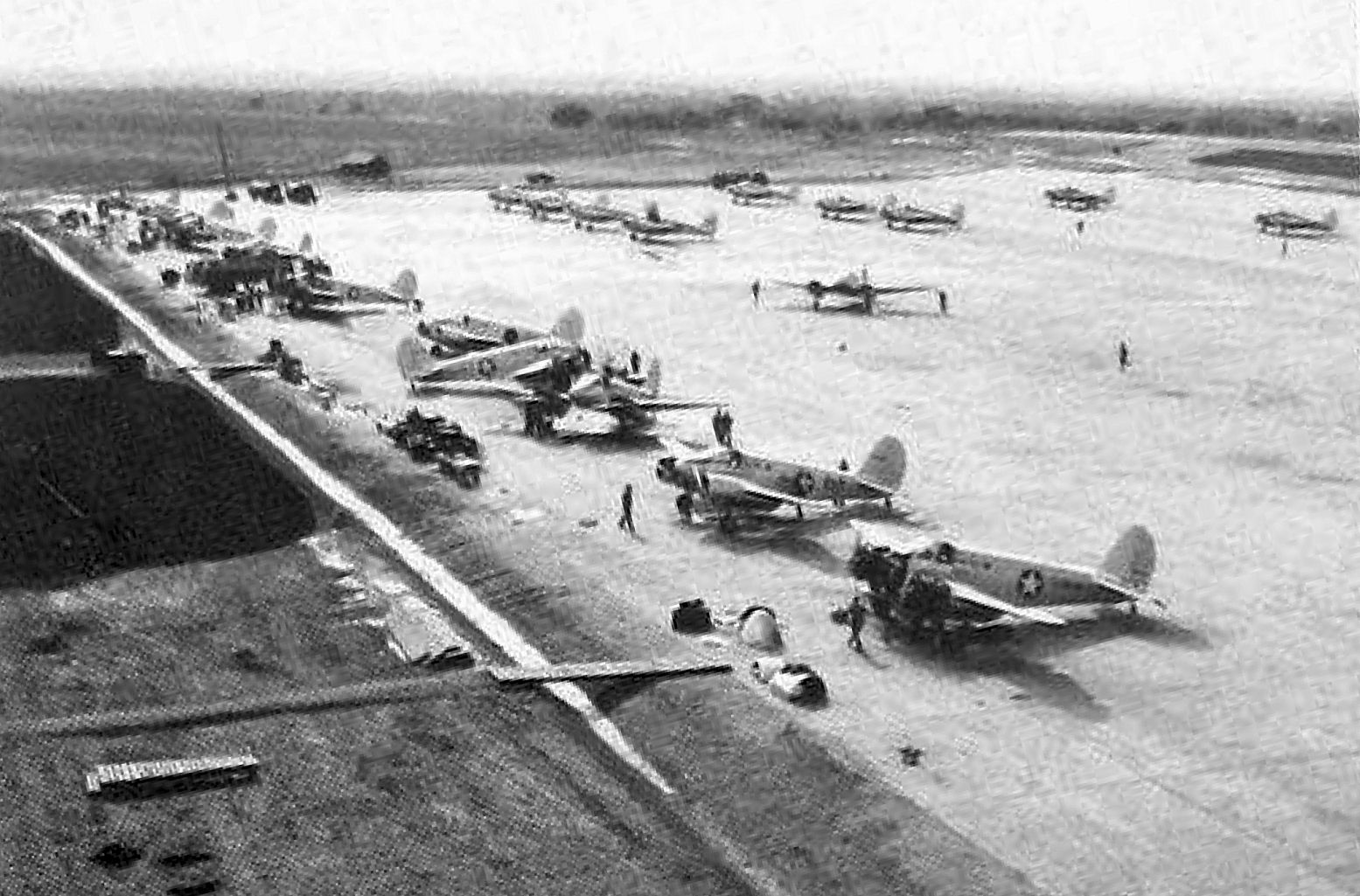
parking ramp

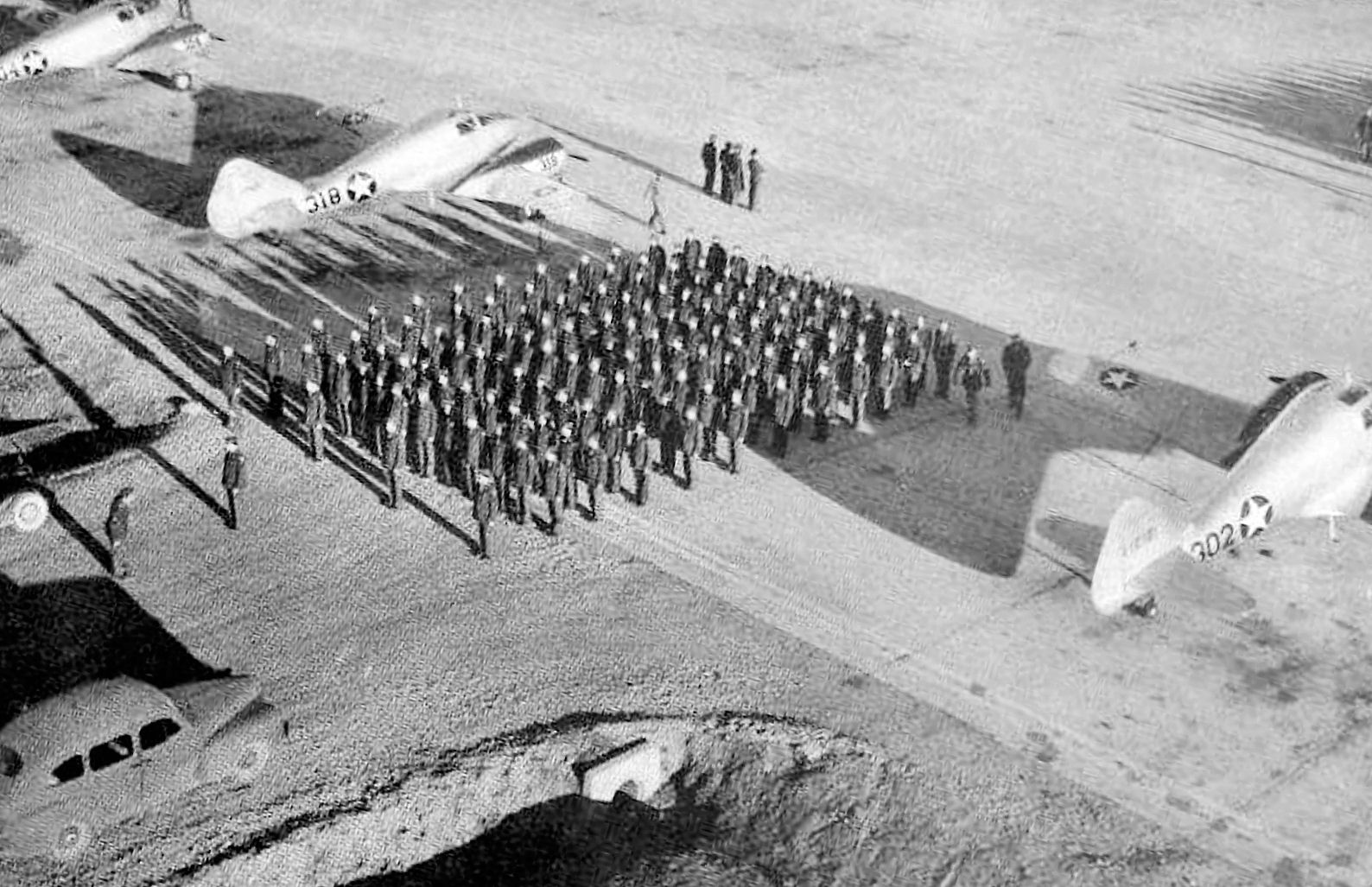
cadets in formation

Waco Regional Airport's history begins in 1941 when some grazing farmland was chosen for the new Waco Municipal Airport. Construction began in late summer 1941.

In early 1942, the War Department leased the site and it was provided to the United States Army Air Forces for a training airfield. At the time, construction consisted of three runways partly completed. The Army Air Force began to rush the project to completion and changed the civil building plans to that of a military airfield and ground station. Barracks, mess halls, a hospital, church, theater, administrative buildings, aircraft hangars and a control tower were built. The facility was initially named China Spring Army Air Field and later Waco Army Air Field No. 2 before being renamed Blackland Army Airfield after the local black soil.

Blackland AAF was activated on 2 July 1942, initially being a glider training school. The AAF brought a nucleus of experienced airmen from other airfields in the AAF Gulf Coast Training Center, and then civilian specialists were recruited from around the United States to supplement the military garrison. The civilian workers were instructed in Army aviation procedures and to fill hundreds of jobs necessary to support the pilot training program.

In October 1942, the Army Air Force Pilot School (Advanced Twin-Engine) was activated (phase 3 pilot training). On 8 January 1943, the War Department constituted and activated the 33d Flying Training Wing (Advanced Twin-Engine) at Blackland and assigned it to the AAF Central Flying Training Command. The school used a number of two-engine trainers, including the Cessna AT-17 Bobcat, Curtiss-Wright AT-9, Beechcraft AT-10 Wichita, and TB-25 Mitchell.

The school's mission was to train cadets to fly twin-engine transports and bombers in a nine-week course. During training flight training was combined with ground school classes including radio navigation, aircraft and naval identification, armament, photo interpretation, weather forecasting and other courses. Several hours of instruction were taught in the ground-based Link Trainers. Pilot wings were awarded upon graduation and were sent on to group combat training by First, Second, Third or Fourth Air Force. Graduates were usually graded as Flight Officers (Warrant Officers); cadets who graduated at the top of their class were graded as Second Lieutenants.

Flying training at the airfield ended on 4 February 1945 and it became a sub-base of Waco Army Airfield. The field became inactive on 31 October 31 1945. By 1950 the facility was disposed of by the War Assets Administration (WAA) and deeded to the local government, being operated as Waco Municipal Airport. Some buildings were used as a public housing project.

The first airline flights were on Braniff, which had been flying to the previous Waco airport since the 1930s. Pioneer arrived in 1947; successor Continental and Braniff pulled out in 1963. Trans-Texas DC-3s appeared in 1956 and left in 1959, then returned in 1963; Texas International's last Convair 600 left in 1978.

== Airline and destination ==
=== Passenger ===
Airlines	Destinations
American Eagle	Dallas/Fort Worth

Destination map
Destination from Waco Regional Airport

== Accidents at ACT ==
- On December 20, 1984, a Jet East Learjet 35 failed to maintain directional control during a simulated engine failure after reaching V1 on takeoff and crashed. There was one fatality among the three occupants on board.

== See also ==
- List of airports in Texas
- TSTC Waco Airport
- Texas World War II Army Airfields
- 33d Flying Training Wing (World War II)
