= Bryan Air Force Base =

Former US military air field near Bryan, Texas

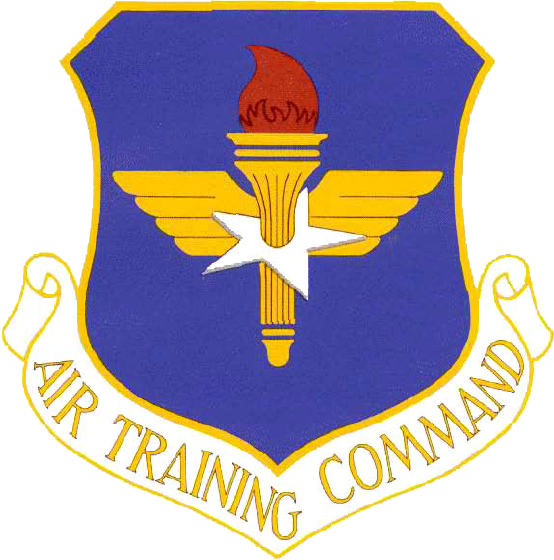
Bryan Air Force Base Bryan Army Airfield
- Part of Air Training Command (ATC)
- Brazos County, near Bryan, Texas
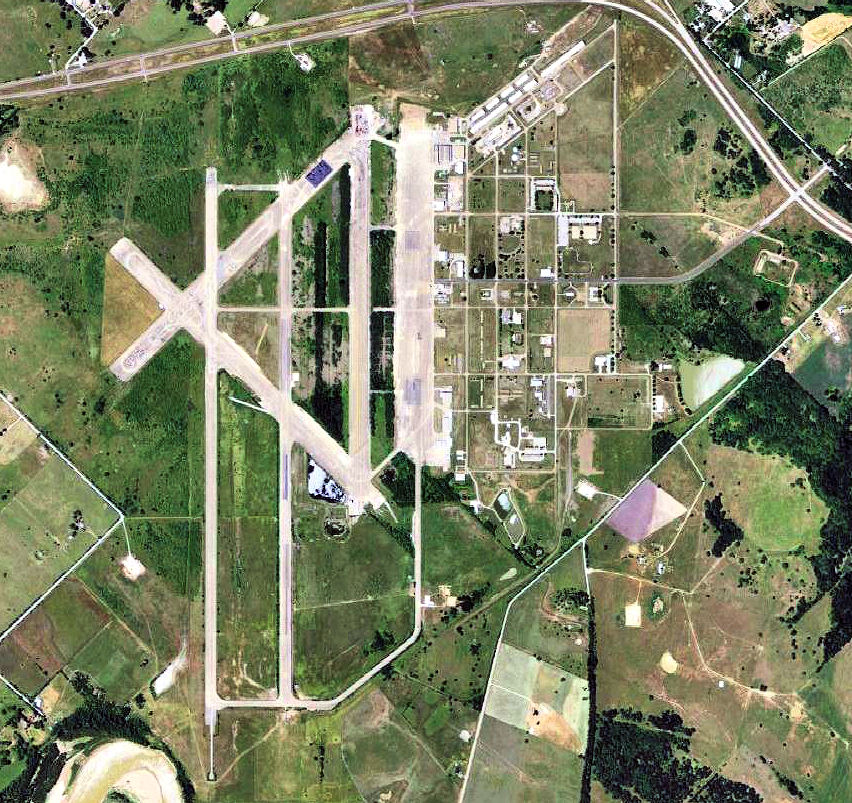
- 2006 USGS Airphoto

Site information
- Type: Air Force Base

Location
- Coordinates: 30°38′16″N 96°28′43″W

Site history
- Built: 1942
- In use: 1942–1947; 1951–1958; 1960–1961

Bryan Air Force Base was a United States Air Force base in Brazos County, Texas, located west of Bryan.

Bryan Air Force Base was originally activated in 1943 as a U.S. Army Air Forces installation known as Bryan Army Air Field. The base housed a flight instructors' school and was assigned the task of developing a standardized system of instrument flight training. The Full Panel Attitude System developed at the base was one of the most significant contributions the base made to pilot training. The instrument training school at Bryan AAF was the only one of its kind in the United States Army Air Forces.

With the end of World War II (WWII), the base was inactivated. The installation became Bryan Air Force Base upon the establishment of the U.S. Air Force (USAF) as a separate service in September 1947.

Following WWII, enrollment at the nearby Agricultural and Mechanical College of Texas (later renamed Texas A&M University) soared due to the G.I. Bill. Housing was in short supply, so between 1946 and 1950, an estimated 5,500 students lived, studied, ate, and attended classes at what became known as the Annex, located in buildings the USAF was not using. Former students lived and studied in cramped, cheaply built and already-dilapidated WWII buildings without heating, air conditioning or indoor plumbing, and described having to hitchhike to and from the remote site if they did not have their own cars.

In 1951, with the outbreak of the Korean War, the base was reactivated for USAF pilot training and the runways were extended. Assigned to the Air Training Command, it conducted advanced flight training in the T-33 Shooting Star. In 1955, after combat in Korea had wound down, the USAF began reducing operations at the base, and in 1957, it announced that the base would be inactivated again in 1958. The USAF fully vacated the base in May 1961.

In 1962, the land and buildings were leased for twenty years to Texas A&M under an arrangement that allowed the General Services Administration to reclaim the base in the event of a national emergency, with a provision allowing the university to eventually buy it outright at a prearranged price that was discounted by five percent each year the lease continued. Texas A&M continued to renew the lease, and in 1988, full ownership of the former base was transferred to Texas A&M at virtually no cost. The site is now home to A&M's RELLIS campus.

== See also ==
- Texas World War II Army Airfields
- 77th Flying Training Wing (World War II)
