= 33rd Flying Training Wing (World War II) =

33d Flying Training Wing
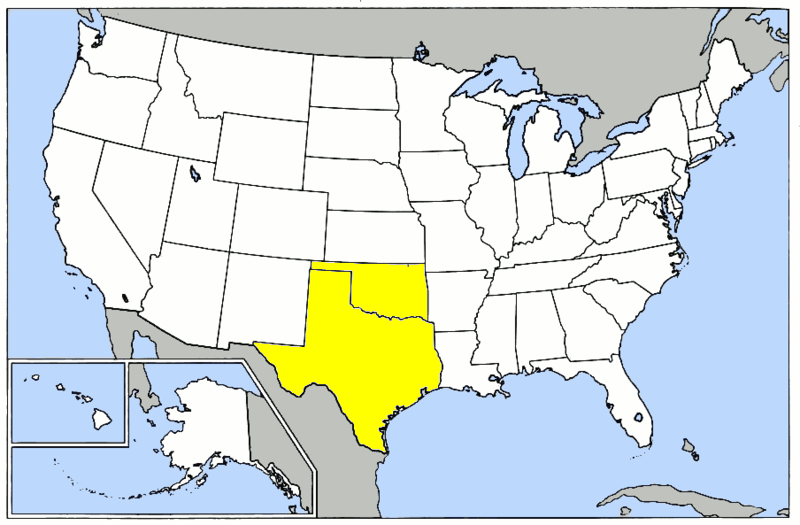
- Locations of airfields controlled by the 33d Flying Training Wing
- Active: 1942–1946
- Country: United States
- Branch: United States Army Air Forces
- Type: Command and Control
- Role: Training
- Part of: Army Air Forces Training Command
- Engagements: World War II: World War II American Theater

The 33d Flying Training Wing is an inactive United States Army Air Forces unit. It was last assigned to the Central Flying Training Command, and was disbanded on 13 October 1946 at Randolph Field, Texas.

There is no lineage link between the United States Air Force 33d Fighter Wing, established on 15 October 1947 at Roswell Army Airfield, New Mexico, and this organization.

== History ==
The wing was a World War II Command and Control organization which supported Training Command Flight Schools in Central and Northern Texas and Oklahoma. The assigned schools provided phase III advanced two-engine flying training for Air Cadets, along with advanced B-25 Mitchell transition training for experienced pilots for reassignment to other flying units. Air Cadet graduates of the advanced schools were commissioned as Second Lieutenants, received their "wings" and were reassigned to Operational or Replacement Training Units operated by one of the four numbered air fores in the zone of interior.

As training requirements changed during the war, schools were activated and inactivated or transferred to meet those requirements.

=== Lineage ===
- Established as 33d Flying Training Wing on 17 December 1942

Activated on 16 January 1943
Disbanded on 13 October 1946.

=== Assignments ===
- AAF Gulf Coast Training Center (later Central Flying Training Command), 16 January 1943 – 13 October 1946

=== Training aircraft ===
The schools of the wing used primarily the Beechcraft AT-7 and Cessna AT-17/UC-78 as their two-engine advanced trainer.

- Curtiss-Wright AT-9 high performance two-engine trainers were also used for high-performance fighter training
- Beechcraft AT-10s for two-engine bomber training.
- North American B-25s were used for two-engine transition training
- L-2, L-3, L-4, TG-5 and TG-6s were used for glider and liaison pilot training

=== Assigned Schools ===
Altus Army Airfield, Altus, Oklahoma
AAF Pilot School (Advanced Two-Engine)
66th Two-Engine Flying Training Group
Opened: June 1942, Closed: May 1945 (AT-9, AT-17, UC-78)
Base closed May 1945; reopened 1953, now Altus Air Force Base

Blackland Army Airfield, Waco, Texas
AAF Pilot School (Advanced 2-Engine), also transition school
73d Two-Engine Flying Training Group
Opened: September 1942, Closed: October 1945 (AT-9, AT-10, AT-17, UC-78, B-25)
Conducted Glider Training August–October 1942; B-25 Transition school opened April 1944

Brooks Field, San Antonio, Texas
AAF Pilot School (Advanced 2-Engine)
67th Two-Engine Flying Training Group
Opened: December 1940, Closed: January 1945 (AT-6, BC-1, O-52)
World War I training airfield, two-engine school opened December 1940; also flew advanced single-engine trainers; trained observation pilots; later Brooks Air Force Base, closed 2011

Ellington Field, Houston, Texas
AAF Pilot School (Advanced 2-Engine)
68th Two-Engine Flying Training Group
Opened: January 1942, Closed: November 1945 (AT-9, AT-10, AT-17, UC-78)
World War I training airfield, re-opened October 1941, later Ellington Air Force Base, closed 1976, now Ellington Air National Guard Base (TX ANG)

Frederick Army Airfield, Frederick, Oklahoma
AAF Pilot School (Advanced 2-Engine), also transition school
70th Two-Engine Flying Training Group
Opened: March 1943, Closed: November 1945 (AT-9, UC-78, A-26, B-25)
B-25 Transition school opened January 1945

Lubbock Army Airfield, Lubbock, Texas
AAF Pilot School (Advanced 2-Engine)
71st Two-Engine Flying Training Group
Opened: February 1942, Closed: January 1945 (AT-6, AT-9, AT-10, AT-17, UC-78)
Also Glider/Liaison pilot training (L-2, L-5, CG-4A) during 1943; became Advanced, Single-Engine, Jan-Oct 1945; reopened 1949 as Reese Air Force Base, closed 1997

Pampa Army Airfield, Pampa, Texas
AAF Pilot School (Advanced 2-Engine), also transition school
74th Two-Engine Flying Training Group
Opened: October 1942, Closed: September 1945 (AT-9, AT-10, AT-17, UC-78, B-25)
B-25 Transition school opened October 1944

=== Stations ===
- Blackland Army Airfield, Texas, 16 January 1943
- Waco Army Airfield, Texas, 8 Jul 1944
- Randolph Field, Texas, (temporary 31 October 1945) permanent 5 August – 13 October 1946

== See also ==
- Army Air Forces Training Command
- Other Central Flying Training Command Flight Training Wings:

31st Flying Training Wing (World War II) Primary Flight Training
32d Flying Training Wing (World War II) Basic Flight Training
34th Flying Training Wing (World War II) Bombardier and Specialized Two/Four-Engine Training
77th Flying Training Wing (World War II) Advanced Flight Training, Single Engine
78th Flying Training Wing (World War II) Classification/Preflight Unit
80th Flying Training Wing (World War II) Navigation and Glider
