= Selman Army Air Field =

Former US Army Air Forces field

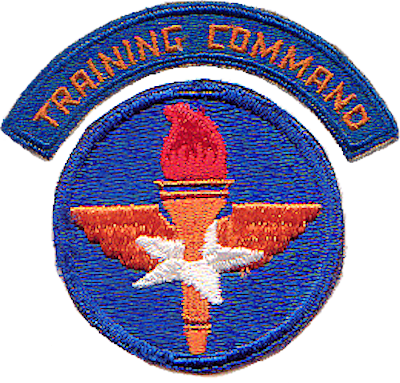
Selman Army Air Field
- Part of Army Air Forces Training Command
- Located near: Monroe, Louisiana
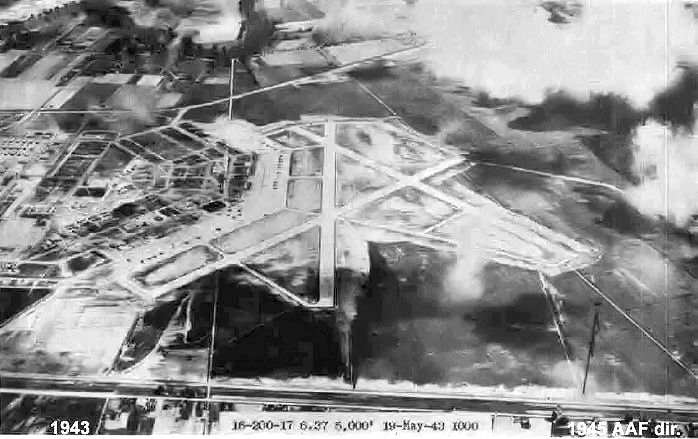
- Selman Army Air Field. 19 May 1943

Location
- Location within Louisiana
- Coordinates: 32°30′39″N 092°02′16″W

Site history
- Built: 1942
- Built by: United States Air Force
- In use: 1942–1945
- Battles/wars: World War II

Selman Army Air Field is an inactive United States Air Force base, approximately 7.7 miles east of Monroe, Louisiana. It was active during World War II as an Army Air Forces Training Command airfield. It was closed on 1 September 1945.

== History ==
In May 1942, Colonel Norris B. Harbold came to Monroe, Louisiana as project officer of the Army Air Forces Navigation School which was to be located at Monroe. The plans were drawn, specifications made, and blueprints approved in the six weeks that followed. The military base was built at the site of a small civil airport constructed in the 1930s named "Selman Airport", which was named after a Navy Pilot, Lieutenant Augustus J. Selman, USN, a native of Monroe, LA, died at Norfolk, Virginia, on November 28, 1921, of injuries received in an airplane crash in the line of duty.

Construction of the base began on 15 June 1942 with the base being activated that day in a paper status. Selman Army Air Field was placed under the jurisdiction of the 74th Flying Training Wing, Army Air Forces Eastern Flying Training Command (EFTC). Base Headquarters was under the jurisdiction of the 329th Base Hq and Air Base Squadron.

Construction was rapid given the emergency wartime conditions and within three months the post was to be in full operation. The airfield consisted of four concrete runways 6100x150(N/S), 5500x150(NE/SW), 6100x150(E/W), 6100x150(NW/SE) taxiways with the runways laid out on an "A" layout, with one extended length main runway, and two short secondary runways connected to an extended, large aircraft parking apron capable of parking several hundred aircraft in an overlapping squares, or "star" layout with a series of taxiways.

In addition to the airfield, the building of a large support base with several hundred buildings, numerous streets, a utility network, was carried out with barracks, various administrative buildings, maintenance shops and hangars. The station facility consisted of a large number of buildings based on standardized plans and architectural drawings, with the buildings designed to be the "cheapest, temporary character with structural stability only sufficient to meet the needs of the service which the structure is intended to fulfill during the period of its contemplated war use" was underway. To conserve critical materials, most facilities were constructed of wood, concrete, brick, gypsum board and concrete asbestos. Metal was sparsely used. The station was designed to be nearly self-sufficient, with not only hangars, but barracks, warehouses, hospitals, dental clinics, dining halls, and maintenance shops were needed. There were libraries, social clubs for officers, and enlisted men, and stores to buy living necessities. The buildings, together with complete water, sewer, electric and gas utilities, the airfield served over 4,000 military personnel. On August 8, the first meal was served on the post in a partly completed mess hall. Forty enlisted men moved out to the post that night and a living military organization began to grow within the gates.

=== Training airfield ===
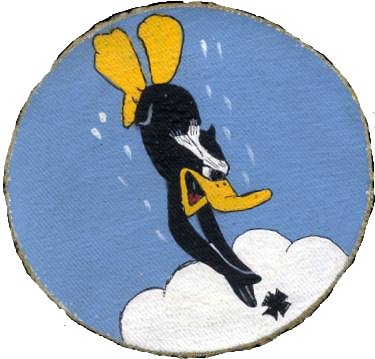
AAF Navigator School patch, 1943

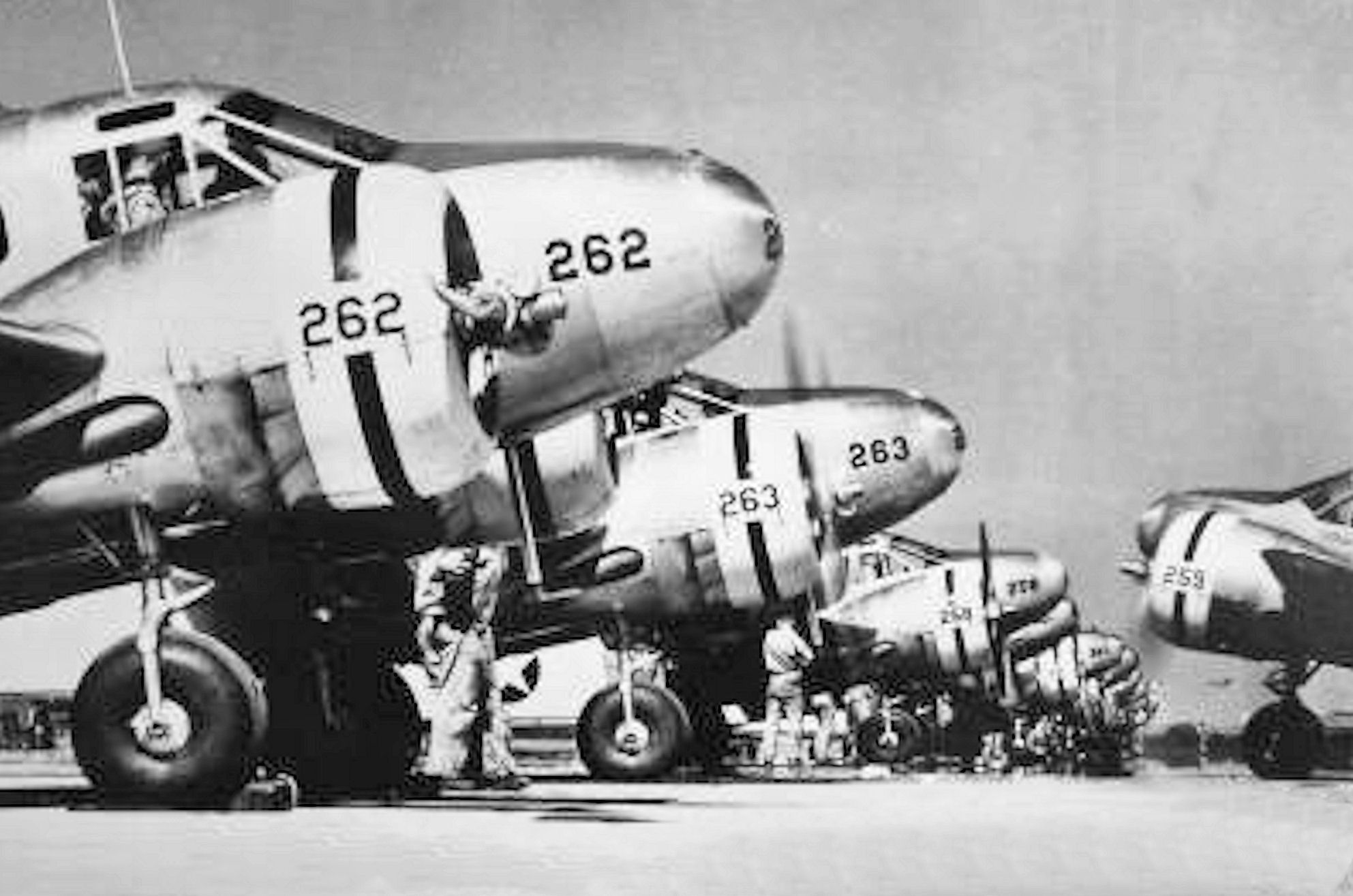
Beechcraft AT-7 Navigators – 1944

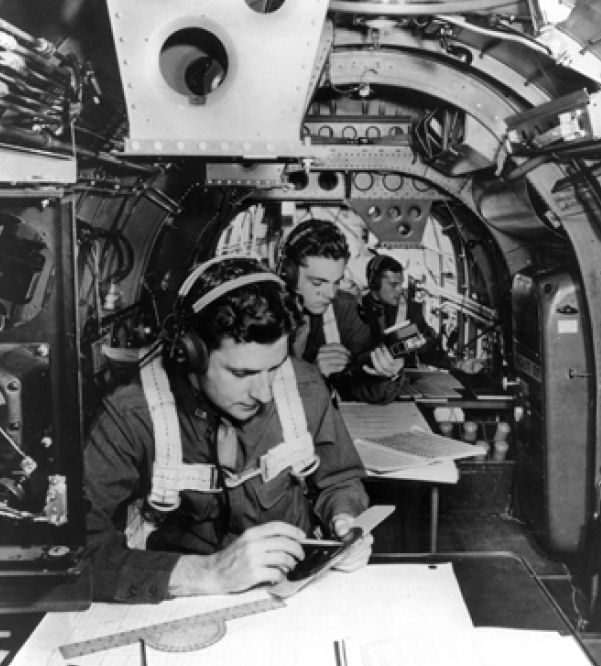
Students learning inflight navigation training.

On August 11, a motor convoy from Turner Field, Albany, Georgia, brought the cadres of the first squadrons of ground troops to the post. On August 15, the AAF Pre-Flight School(Bombardier-Navigator) was transferred to Selman AAF from Maxwell Field, Alabama. The day after the arrival of the staff, enlisted men and cadets of the Pre-Flight School, classes were in session in improvised academic halls. The cadets had lost only one day of classes in moving nearly 400 miles, with the day spent on the train. Vultee BT-13 Valiants were flown for basic flying training, and TC-47 Skytrains and TC-46 Commandos were used beginning in late 1944 for various administrative needs by the Base Flight.

The last elements of the Advanced Navigation School arrived on the night of September 14, one day less than three months after the activation date. Selman Field was the largest navigation school in the United States in its time and the nation's only complete navigation course—from start to finish—during World War II. The vast majority of aircraft flown at Selman AAF were Beech C-45 Expeditors, also known as the AT-7. Of the hundreds of fields that were operated by the Army Air Forces, it was only at Selman that a cadet could get his entire training—pre-flight and advanced—and wind up with a commission and navigators wings without ever leaving the field.

Once in operation, the Navigator school expanded rapidly. Over 15,000 navigators were trained at Selman Field, who flew in every theater of operations during the war. Women Airforce Service Pilots (WASP) squadrons were assigned to Selman AAF in 1944. WASPs flew C-45s in navigational flying to train cadet

The curriculum consisted of teaching young men how to "get 'em there and get 'em back." The cadet had to know all aspects of navigation in order to determine where he was, where he wanted to go and when he would get there. The science of navigation offered four methods of accomplishing this. The first is pilotage or navigating by landmarks, using maps and charts. The second is dead reckoning, which consist of keeping track of how far you have gone and in what direction since you started, using instruments which measure various aspects of the plane in motion, such as speed, deviation, wind drift and so on. The third method is radio navigation which consists of "riding the beam" from one station to another until you progress to where you want to go. The final way to navigate is by celestial bodies. These are immutable, but you must be able to identify them in their different configurations in all quarters of the heavens at all times of the night and day. Armed with the best knowledge and training possible. The navigation cadets graduated and became members of combat crews.

On 1 May 1944, Training Command inactivated the Navigator School, being re-designated as the 329th Army Air Forces Base Unit (Navigation School). The 842d and 843d training squadrons were reorganized into Squadron "A" and Squadron "B" and assigned to the 2023d AAFBU. By November 1944, instructors at the navigation school were primarily combat veterans who had flown their required number of combat missions for rotation back to the United States.

With the end of the war in Europe, the school for a while continued navigation training. The navigation school increased to twenty-four weeks in May 1945, with new subjects including radar indoctrination, over water flight, and cruise control.

=== Closure ===
Shortly after the conclusion of hostilities with Japan, the Army Air Forces decided to concentrate all navigation training at Ellington Field, Texas, which previously had trained instructors and graduate navigators. Navigator training ended on 1 September 1945 when the school was closed. With the end of the war in the Pacific, students at Selman AAF were asked if they wanted to remain in the postwar Air Forces. Those who elected to remain were reassigned to Ellington to continue their training, and those who elected for separation were assigned other general duties on the field.

After the school closure Selman AAF was used as a separation center for returning overseas personnel. By mid-December the last of the training aircraft were flown to reclamation centers for sale or scrapping. In early July 1946 Selman received orders from Air Training Command to shut down operations as a separation center for returning overseas personnel, with a programmed closure date of the end of the month.

The airport was returned to civil control on 31 July 1946. However, it was reopened as a minimally-staffed satellite field of Barksdale Field, Shreveport, Louisiana. Selman Field was officially deactivated on 30 June 1947.

=== Postwar use ===
The ownership of the property was transferred to the City of Monroe in September 1949. Monroe Regional Airport is now a public use airport in Ouachita Parish, Louisiana, United States. The airport is owned by the City of Monroe and is located three nautical miles (6 km) east of its central business district. The airport is advertised as the birthplace of Delta Air Lines; the airport's logo is a variant on the Delta logo.

Today the wartime airfield is largely intact, the 04/22 NE/SW main runway being extended for jet use. The large parking apron remains intact, with the civilian air terminal being built on the concrete of the ramp. Several wartime hangars remain and are still in use. The buildings of the ground station were sold, removed or torn down over the years and the area has been totally re-engineered, the wartime streets removed and the base converted into a business complex with light industry. The only possible remnant of the base is a baseball field, and the Chennault Aviation and Military Museum.

== See also ==
- Chennault Aviation Museum Monroe LA.
- Louisiana World War II Army Airfields
