= Orange County Fair (California) =

County Fair of Orange County, California

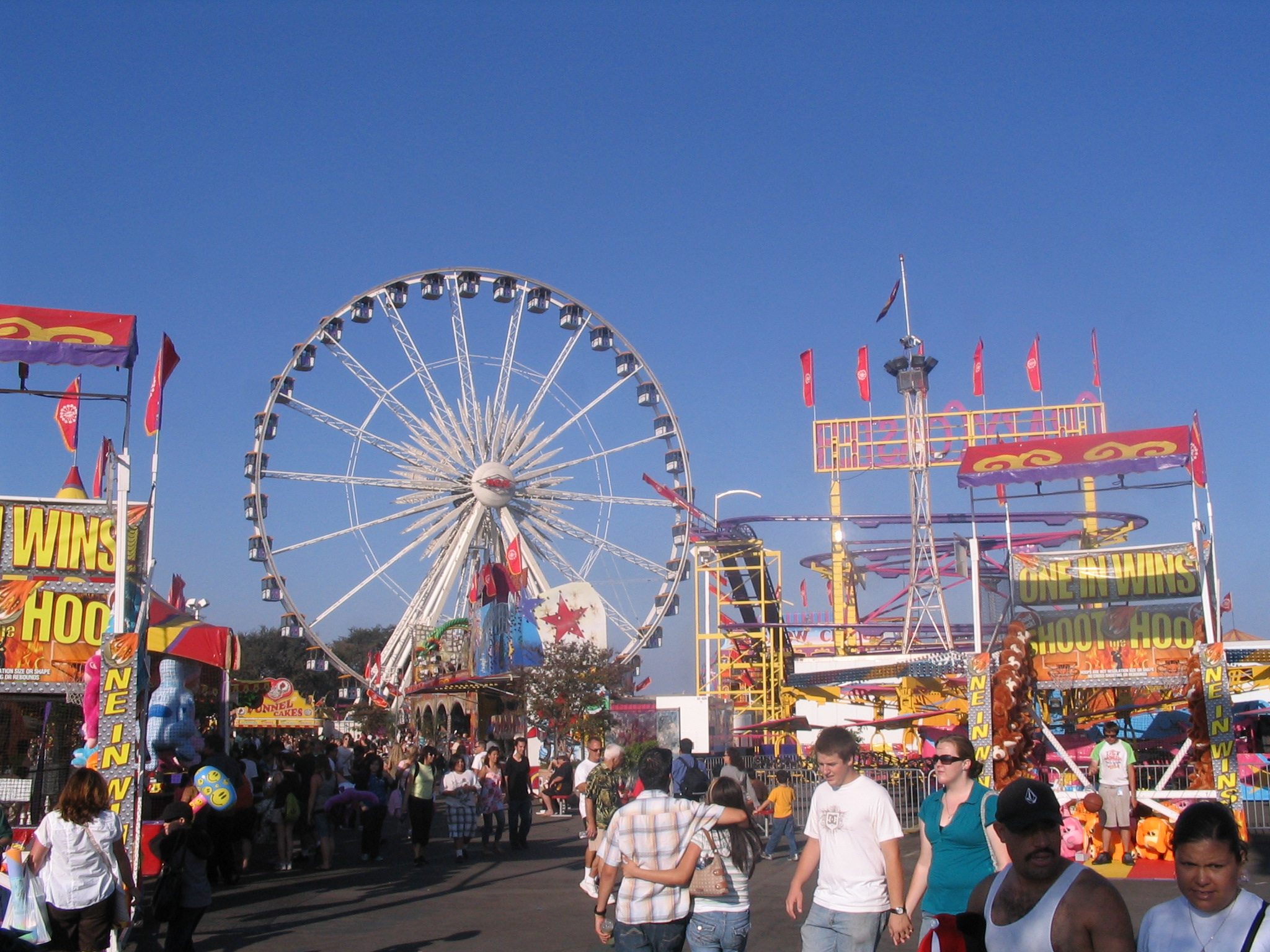
- The midway of the Orange County Fair in 2008.
- Interactive map of Orange County Fair
- Location: OC Fair & Event Center; 88 Fair Drive, Costa Mesa, California, United States
- Coordinates: 33°40′0″N 117°54′4″W
- Status: Operating
- Opened: 1890, 1919, 1946, 2021
- Closed: 1916, 1941, 2020
- Theme: Your Adventure Awaits.
- Operating season: Mid-July to mid-August
- Attendance: 1 million+
- Website: OC Fair

The Orange County Fair, abbreviated as the OC Fair, is a 23-day annual fair that is held every summer at the OC Fair & Event Center in Costa Mesa, California. The 2026 OC Fair will be held from July 17 to August 16, and the theme will be “Your Adventure Awaits”.

== History ==
The fair first took place in the year 1890 and consisted of some minor exhibits in Santa Ana and a horse race. From 1890 to 1894 the fair was run by the Orange County Community Fair Corporation, but was then taken over by the Orange County Fair Association, Inc. Early fairs mainly consisted of horse races and livestock shows, but around 1900 new carnival-like attractions were added and the fair become a yearly occurrence. The fair was located in Santa Ana, except for a brief interval after World War I, when it was moved to Huntington Beach.

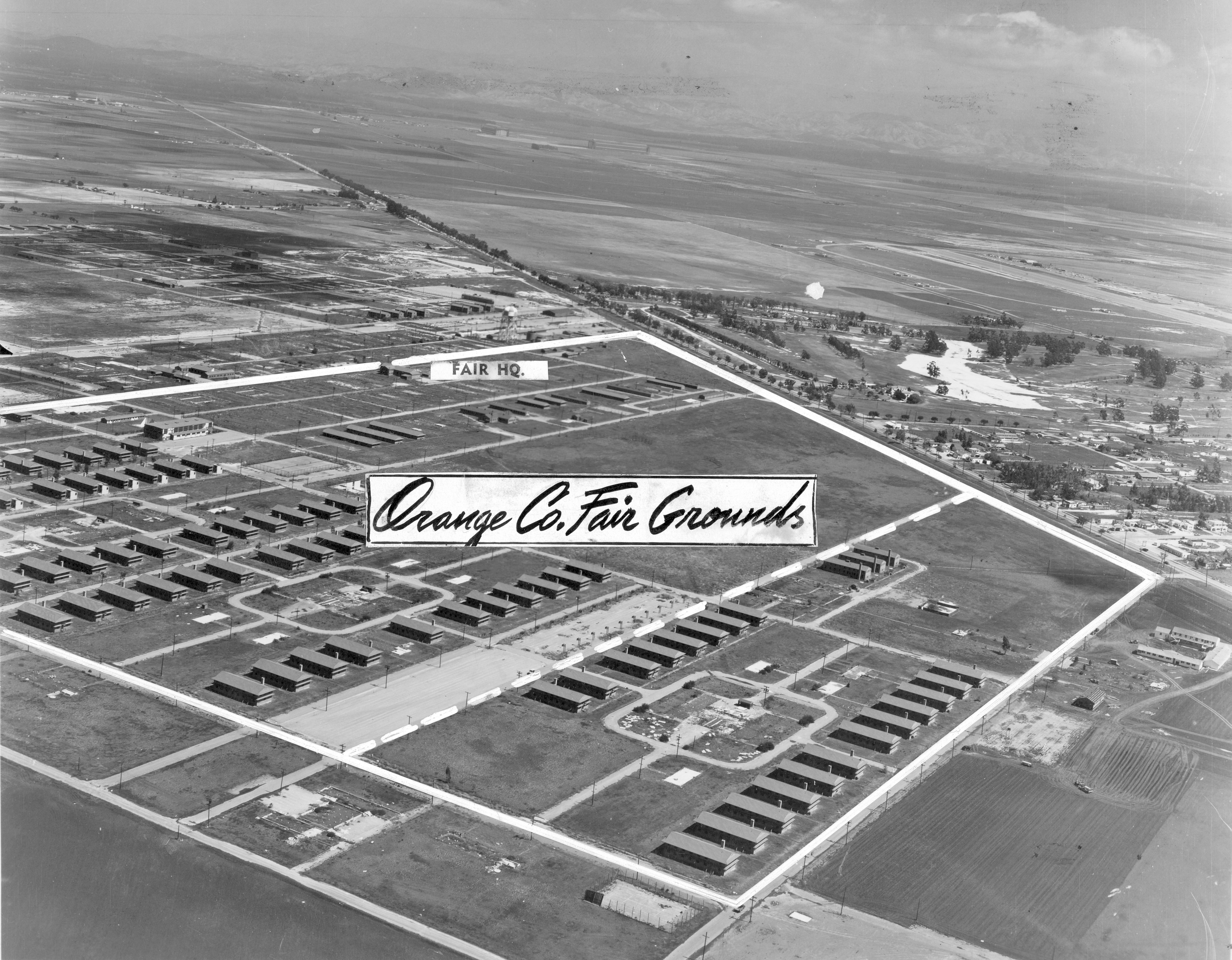
OC Fair in 1949

Starting in 1916, the fair was managed by the Orange County Farm Bureau. An Orange County Fair Board was elected in 1925, and the fair was moved to Anaheim with the addition of a rodeo and carnival. From 1932 to 1939, the fair was located in Pomona, California as part of a combined Orange, Los Angeles, and Riverside County Fair. Following World War II the 32nd District Agricultural Association was formed by the state of California, and it took on the task of running the fair. The state purchased land from the Santa Ana Army Air Base and set some of it aside for use as a new fairgrounds. In 1949 the fair became a five-day-long event and was relocated to the old army base, which quickly became the permanent location.

The city of Costa Mesa was incorporated in 1953 with the fair residing in its boundaries. The fairgrounds' 150 acres has been the home of the fair ever since 1949 and has expanded to an annual 23 day summer event.

On April 27, 2020, for the first time in 75 years, the 2020 fair was cancelled in response to the COVID-19 pandemic; since 2021, hand sanitizers were installed within the premises, to prevent this and other diseases from spreading, plus social distancing & wearing masks are being adhered to. It was also cancelled in 1917–18 & 1942–45.

== Attendance ==
The Orange County Fair is the 9th-largest fair in the United States. Since 2021, there has been daily ticket limitations, but starting 2026, attendance will be limited to 55,000 people daily.

Year	Attendance
2025	1,162,872
2024	1,137,555
2023	1,048,181
2022	1,055,173
2021	1,055,770
2020	0
2019	1,393,482
2018	1,470,636
2017	1,334,000
2016	1,344,996
2015	1,301,445
2014	1,337,167
2012	1,300,000
2011	1,400,280
2010	1,135,536
2009	1,070,061
2008	1,062,673
2007	1,090,653
2006	924,315
2005	1,058,192
2004	963,984
2003	881,596
2002	898,197
2001	843,347
2000	808,810
1999	724,561
1998	723,061
1997	785,944

== Climate ==
The Fairground in Costa Mesa has a Mediterranean climate (Köppen climate classification Csb), that is nearly perfect for its many outdoor activities.

Climate data for Costa Mesa
Month	Jan	Feb	Mar	Apr	May	Jun	Jul	Aug	Sep	Oct	Nov	Dec	Year
Mean daily maximum °F (°C)	64 (18)	64 (18)	64 (18)	66 (19)	79 (26)	82 (28)	85 (29)	90 (32)	86 (30)	86 (30)	68 (20)	64 (18)	68 (20)
Mean daily minimum °F (°C)	44 (7)	50 (10)	51 (11)	54 (12)	57 (14)	60 (16)	63 (17)	64 (18)	63 (17)	54 (12)	42 (6)	38 (3)	56 (13)
Average precipitation inches (mm)	2.60 (66)	2.54 (65)	2.25 (57)	.70 (18)	.18 (4.6)	.08 (2.0)	.02 (0.51)	.09 (2.3)	.30 (7.6)	.28 (7.1)	1.02 (26)	1.59 (40)	11.65 (296)
Source: Weather Channel

== Gallery ==
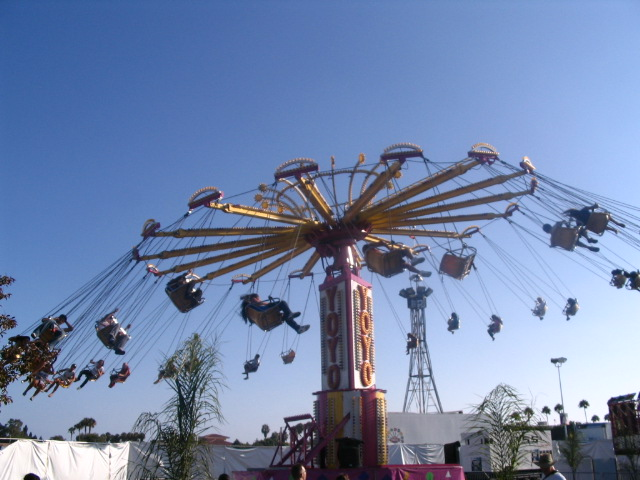
Swings

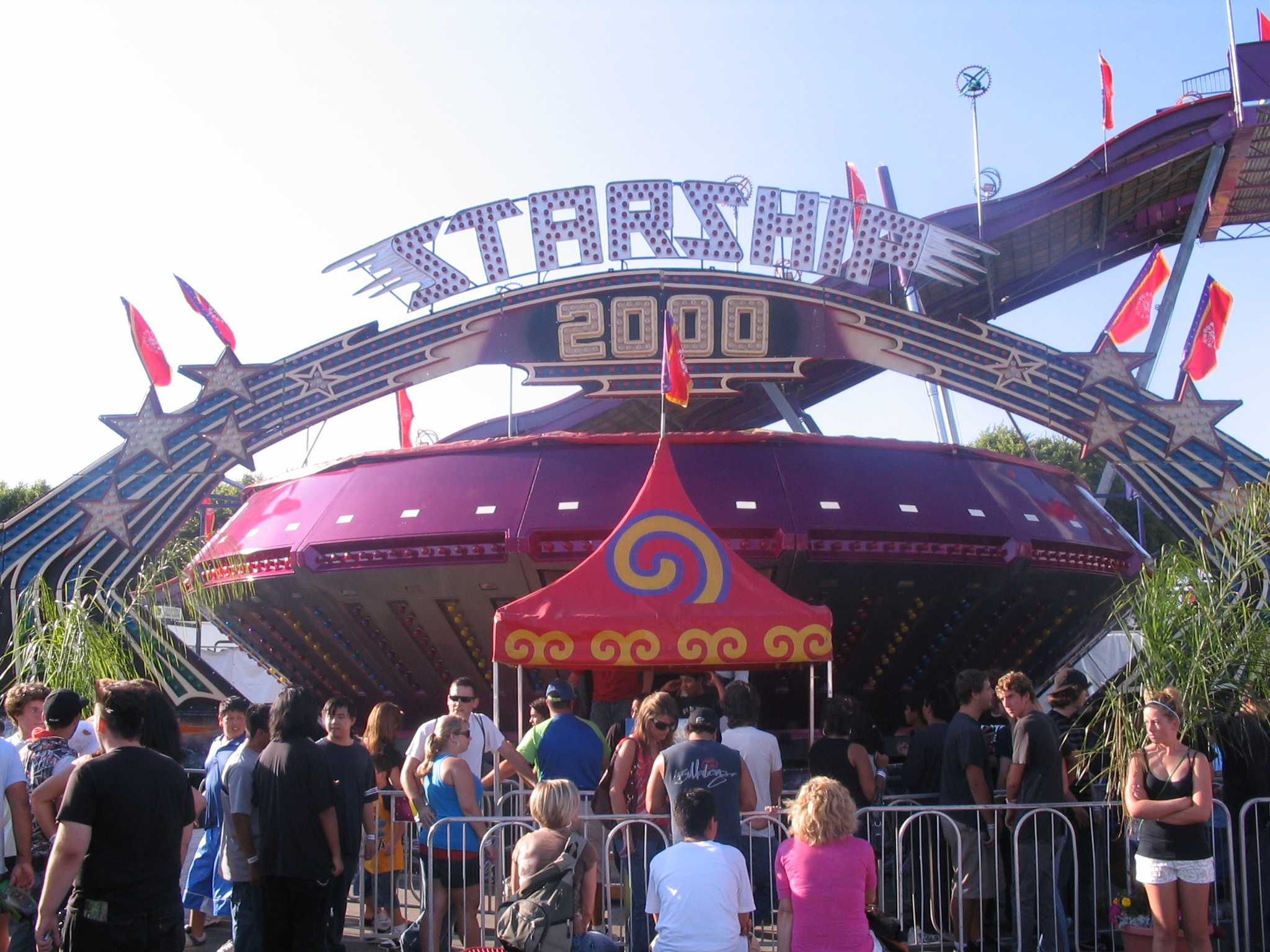
Starship 2000

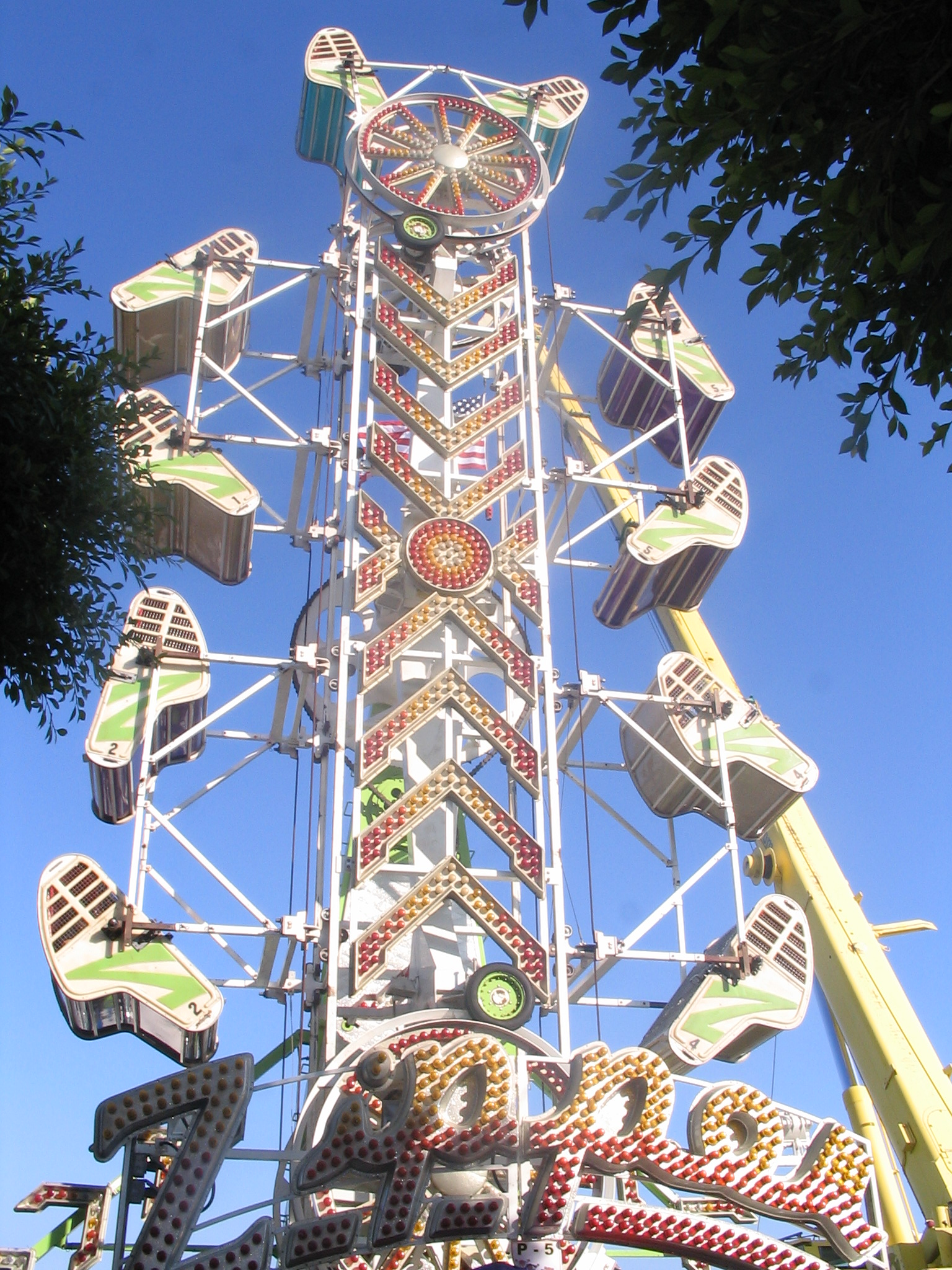
The Zipper
