= 34th Operations Group =

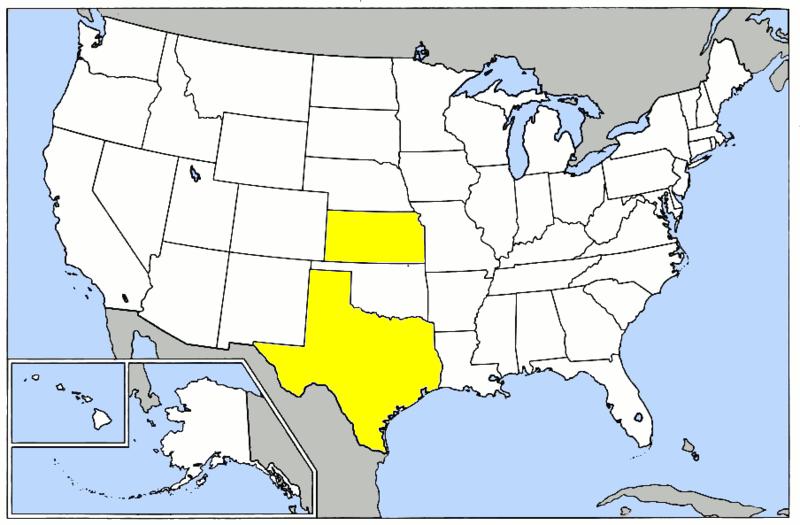
- Locations of airfields controlled by the 34th Flying Training Wing
- Active: 1942–1946; 1978–1991; 1994–2004
- Country: United States
- Branch: United States Army United States Air Force
- Role: Training

The 34th Operations Group is an inactive United States Air Force unit. It was first activated as the 34th Flying Training Wing and supervised training of bombardiers and pilots for multiengine aircraftuntil it was disbanded on 16 June 1946 at Midland Army Air Field, Texas. The wing was reactivated in 1978 as the 34th Tactical Airlift Training Group and conducted various courses for crews of the Lockheed C-130 Hercules until inactivating in December 1961. It was activated a third time in 1994 as the 34th Operations Group and conducted airmanship training at the United States Air Force Academy.

== History ==
The wing supervised Training Command Flight Schools in Central and Northern Texas and Oklahoma. The assigned schools provided specialized training for bombardiers, and the wing was the home of the "West Texas Bombardier Quadrangle" schools (Childress, Midland, San Angelo, and Big Spring Army Airfields).

The wing also provided specialized schools for training on the two-engine Martin B-26 Marauder medium bomber (Dodge City, Laughlin Army Airfields), and the Consolidated B-24 Liberator four-engine heavy bomber (Fort Worth, Liberal Army Airfields). After graduation Air Cadets were commissioned as Second Lieutenants, received their "wings" and were reassigned to Operational or Replacement Training Units operated by one of the four numbered air fores in the zone of interior.

As training requirements changed during the war, schools were activated, inactivated, or transferred to meet them.

When the United States Air Force became a separate service in September 1947, former Air Corps units that had been disbanded, including this wing, were transferred to it.

The wing was reconstituted in 1978 as the 34th Tactical Airlift Training Group at Little Rock Air Force Base, Arkansas and supervised training courses for the Lockheed C-130 Hercules until inactivating in 1991 with the implementation of the Objective Wing organization by its parent 314th Tactical Airlift Wing.

The group was again activated as the 34th Operations Group and supervised airmanship training for the 34th Training Wing at the United States Air Force Academy, Colorado until inactivating in 2004 and transferring its mission to the 306th Flying Training Group

== Lineage ==
- Established as the 34th Flying Training Wing (Bombardier, Specialized) on 17 December 1942

Activated on 8 January 1943
Disbanded on 16 June 1946

- Reconstituted 1978 as 34th Tactical Airlift Training Group

Activated on 15 September 1978
Inactivated on 1 December 1991

- Redesignated 34th Operations Group in 1994

Activated on 1 October 1994
Inactivated on 4 October 2004

=== Assignments ===
- AAF Gulf Coast Training Center (later Central Flying Training Command), 8 January 1943 – 16 June 1946
- 314th Tactical Airlift Wing, 15 September 1978 – 1 December 1991
- 34th Training Wing, 1 October 1994 – 4 October 2004

=== Stations ===
- San Angelo Army Air Field, Texas, 8 January 1943
- Midland Army Air Field, Texas, 25 May 1945 – 16 June 1946
- Little Rock Air Force Base, Arkansas, 15 September 1978 – 1 December 1991
- United States Air Force Academy, Colorado, 1 October 1994 – 4 October 2004

=== Training aircraft ===
The schools of the wing used primarily the Beechcraft AT-11 for bombardier training.

- Two-Engine training was performed on the Martin B-26 Marauder
- Four-Engine training was performed on the Consolidated B-24 Liberator

=== Assigned Schools ===
Big Spring Army Air Field, Big Spring, Texas
AAF Bombardier School
77th Bombardier Training Group
Opened: August 1942, Closed: December 1945 (AT-11)
One of the "West Texas Bombardier Quadrangle" schools; closed 1945, reopened 1951 as Big Spring Air Force Base; later Webb Air Force Base, closed 1977

Childress Army Air Field, Childress, Texas
AAF Bombardier School
79th Bombardier Training Group
Opened January 1943, Closed: December 1945 (AT-11)
One of the "West Texas Bombardier Quadrangle" schools.

Dodge City Army Air Field, Dodge City, Kansas
AAF Pilot School (Specialized, Two-Engine)
Opened May 1943, Closed: December 1945 (B-26)
Provided B-26 Marauder training and transition training. Also trained Free French and WASP pilots on the B-26

Fort Worth Army Air Field, Fort Worth, Texas
AAF Pilot School (Specialized, 4-Engine), also Transition School
96th Pilot Transition Training Group (4 Engine)
Opened May 1943, Closed: December 1945 (B-24)
Also known as Tarrant Army Airfield; performed B-32 Dominator training in 1945; remained open after the war as Carswell AFB, closed 1993, now NAS Fort Worth (Navy), Carswell Field, (USAFR)

Laughlin Army Air Field, Del Rio, Texas
AAF Pilot School (Specialized, Two-Engine)
Opened January 1943, Closed: August 1945 (B-26)
Provided B-26 Marauder training and transition training. Also trained Free French and WASP pilots on the B-26; Became A-26 Invader school, August 1945; remained open after the war as Laughlin Air Force Base.

Liberal Army Air Field, Liberal, Kansas
AAF Pilot School (Specialized, Four-Engine)
Opened May 1943, Closed: September 1945 (B-24)
Provided 4-engine training on the B-24 Liberator and transition training.

Midland Army Air Field, Midland, Texas
AAF Instructors School (Bombardiers)
AAF Bombardier School
78th Bombardier Training Group
Opened January 1942, Closed: December 1945 (AT-11)
One of the "West Texas Bombardier Quadrangle" schools.

San Angelo Army Air Field, San Angelo, Texas
AAF Pilot School (Basic)
49th Basic Flying Training Group
AAF Bombardier School
76th Bombardier Training Group
Opened: February 1941, Closed: August 1945 (BT-14, BT-15, AT-11)
Basic school closed March 1942; One of the "West Texas Bombardier Quadrangle" schools.

== See also ==
- Army Air Forces Training Command
- Other Central Flying Training Command Flight Training Wings:

31st Flying Training Wing (World War II) Primary Flight Training
32d Flying Training Wing (World War II) Basic Flight Training
33d Flying Training Wing (World War II) Advanced Flight Training, Two Engine
77th Flying Training Wing (World War II) Advanced Flight Training, Single Engine
78th Flying Training Wing (World War II) Classification/Preflight Unit
80th Flying Training Wing (World War II) Navigation and Glider
