= Pampa Army Air Field =

Abandoned airfield in Gray County, Texas

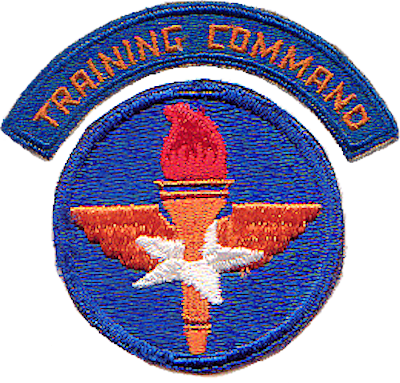
Pampa Army Airfield
- Part of Army Air Forces Flying Training Command
- Gray County, near Pampa, Texas
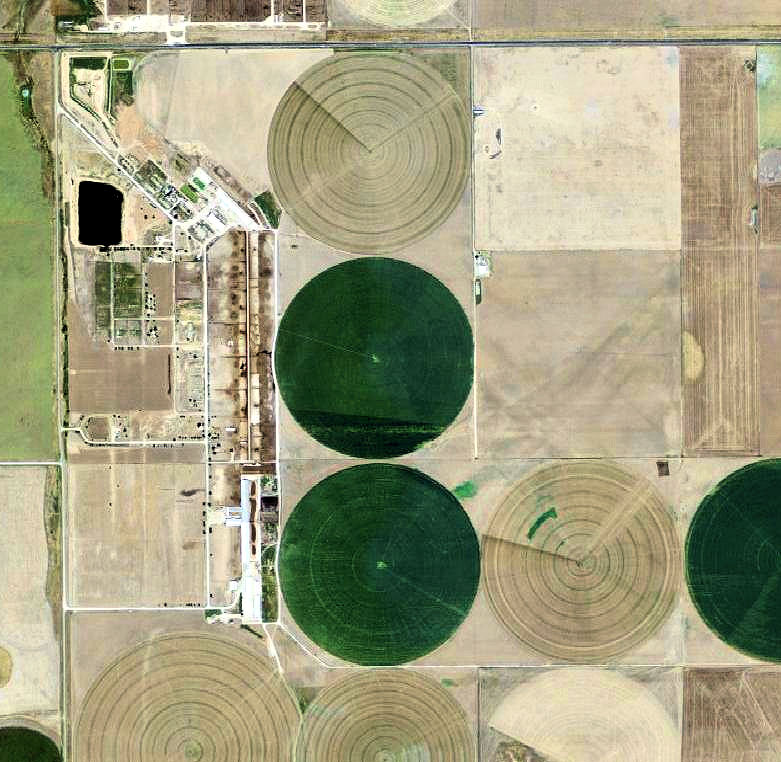
- 2006 USGS Airphoto

Site information
- Type: Military airfield
- Controlled by: United States Army Air Forces

Location
- Coordinates: 35°32′17″N 100°44′58″W

Site history
- Built: 1942
- In use: 1942–1945

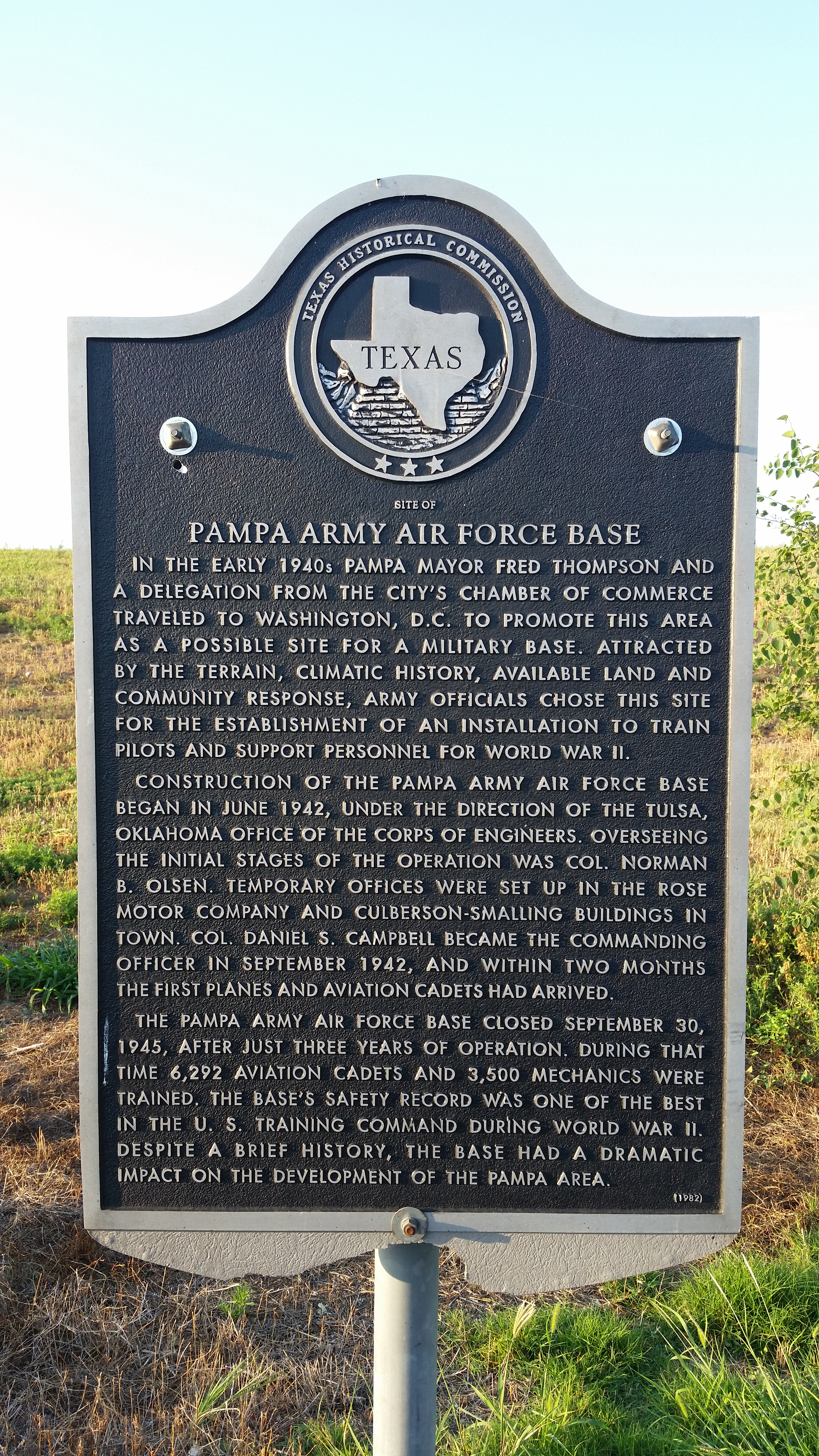
Texas Historical marker for Pampa Army Air Force Base

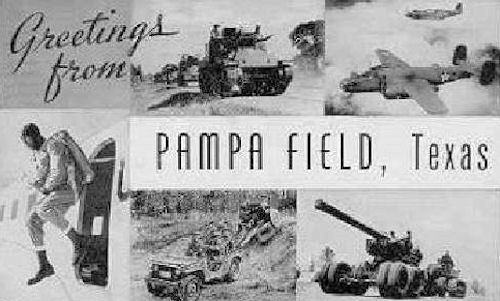
World War II Postcard of Pampa AAF

Pampa Army Air Field 1943 Classbook

Pampa Army Airfield is an abandoned airfield located about 11 miles east of Pampa in Gray County, Texas. During World War II, the United States Army Air Forces used Pampa Airfield as a training airfield by the Army Air Forces Flying Training Command, Gulf Coast Training Center.

== History ==
Construction of the airfield began in June 1942 under the supervision of the Tulsa, Oklahoma, office of the United States Army Corps of Engineers. The immediate construction included three concrete runways, several taxiways, a large parking apron, and a control tower. Four large hangars were also constructed. Most base buildings, not meant for long-term use, were quickly constructed of temporary or semi-permanent materials. Although some hangars had steel frames and the occasional brick or tile brick building could be seen, most support buildings sat on concrete foundations but were of frame construction clad in little more than plywood and tarpaper. Pampa Airfield was activated on 3 August 1942.

Also known as the "Eagles' Nest of the High Plains," Pampa offered advanced twin-engine training in Beechcraft AT-10 Wichita planes. Also stationed at the field were Curtiss-Wright AT-9, North American B-25 Mitchell, and Cessna AT-17 Bobcat aircraft. During the war, Pampa had a total of 4 satellite fields:

- Reeves Aux #1 (6 miles south of Pampa, TX)
- Thompson Aux #2 (6 miles NNW of Pampa, TX), later reused as Perry Lefors Airport
- Hoover Aux #3 (9 miles northwest of Pampa AAF), of which only a small foundation remains
- Laketon Aux #4 (9 miles ENE of Pampa AAF), of which no trace remains

During its three years of operation the base graduated 6,292 cadets, trained 3,500 aircraft mechanics, and had one of the best safety records in the United States Training Command throughout the war.

Advanced flight training ended at Pampa on 28 December 1944 and the base was transferred as a sub-base of Liberal Army Airfield, Kansas where it supported the heavy 4-engine training school there. With the end of the war, Pampa AAF was inactivated on 30 September 1945 and transferred to the Army Corps of Engineers. The airfield remained in inactive status until 1948 when it was reopened as Pampa Air Force Auxiliary Field #1. The Pampa airfield remained on the Air Force property rolls until at least 1952, but was then closed again. It was declared excess in 1955, and the last tract of land was sold in 1957 to agricultural interests.

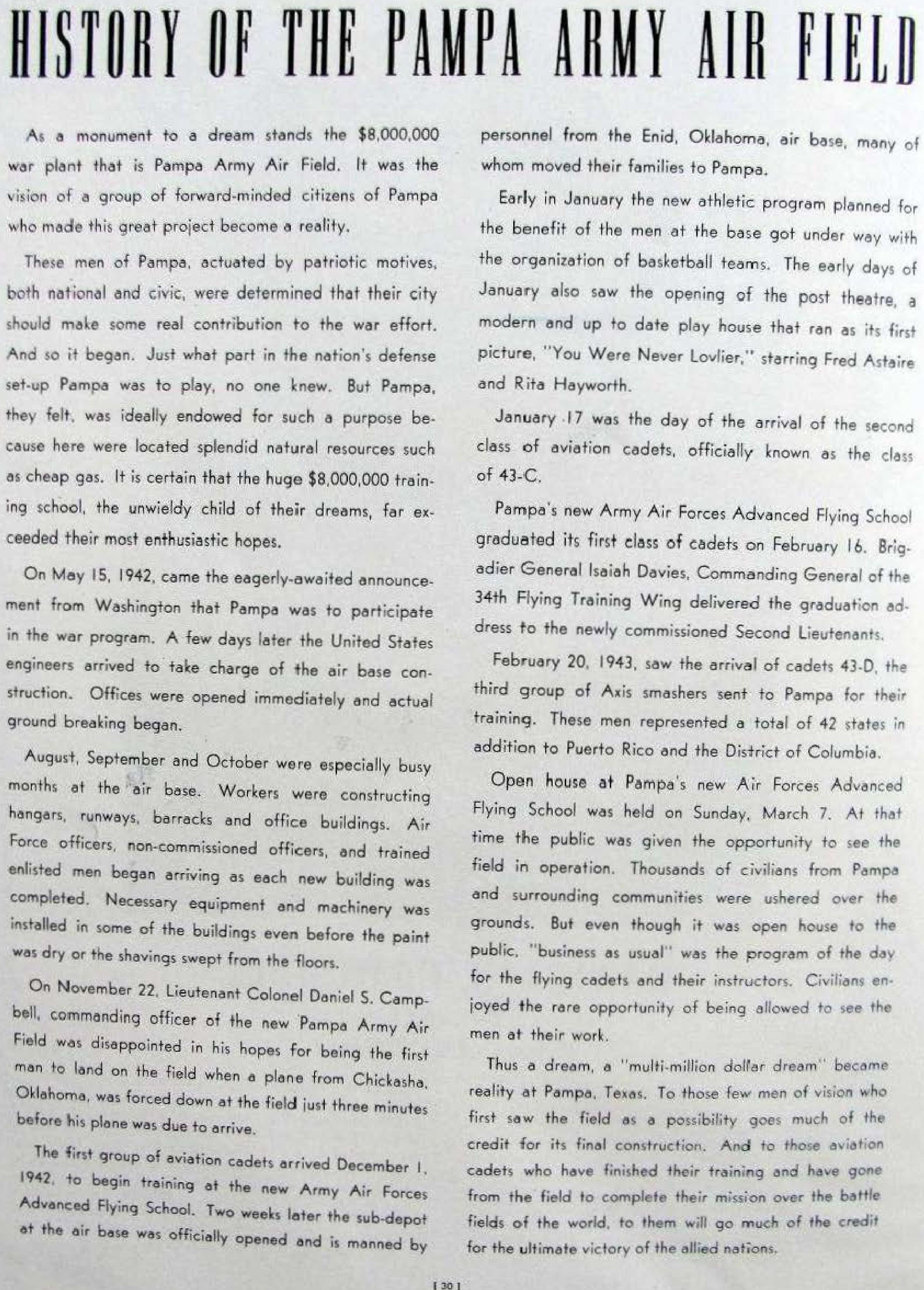
"History of the Pampa Army Air Field" in 1943 classbook

In 1982 a Texas Historical Commission historical marker was placed near the site, at the intersection of TX 152 & Farm to Market Road 1474. All that remains of Pampa Army Airfield today is the concrete water tower, a single hangar, and a broken parking apron. The runways, taxiways, and most of the streets of the administrative area are gone. The main entrance to the base can be found, and the outlines of the parade ground still exist. A few postwar agricultural buildings use the concrete foundations of their World War II predecessors, and the occasional concrete foundation of a wartime building is found. Most of the administrative area consists of farmers fields or scrubland.

As of 2022, the site was used as a cow dairy.

== See also ==
- Texas World War II Army Airfields
- 33d Flying Training Wing (World War II)
