= 81st Flying Training Wing (World War II) =

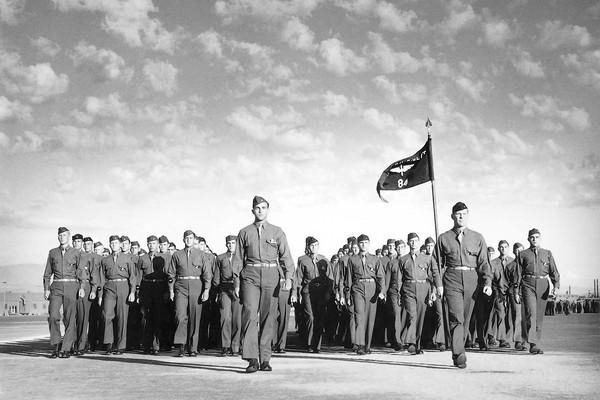
- Cadets marching at Santa Ana Army Air Base In the early 1940s,
- Active: 1943–1945
- Country: United States
- Branch: United States Army Air Forces
- Type: Command and Control
- Role: Training
- Part of: Army Air Forces Training Command
- Engagements: World War II: World War II American Theater

The 81st Flying Training Wing is an inactive United States Air Force unit. It was last assigned to the Western Flying Training Command and was disbanded on 1 November 1945 at the Santa Ana Army Air Base, California.

The squadron was a World War II Command and Control unit. Its mission was to provide classification and preflight testing of aviation cadets. It was one of three such centers; the others being at Maxwell Field, Alabama and San Antonio Aviation Cadet Center, Texas.

There is no lineage between the current United States Air Force 81st Training Wing, established on 15 April 1948 at Wheeler Field, Hawaii, and this organization.

== History ==
The mission of the wing was to provide both Classification and Preflight stage training to air cadets who had completed Training Command basic indoctrination training.

- Classification Stage processed the cadet and issued him his equipment. This was the stage where it would be decided whether the cadet would train as a navigator, bombardier, or pilot.
- Pre-Flight Stage taught the mechanics and physics of flight and required the cadets to pass courses in mathematics and the hard sciences. Then, the cadets were taught to apply their knowledge practically by teaching them aeronautics, deflection shooting, and thinking in three dimensions. The 81st FTW was the only wing which provided preflight training for pilots, navigators and bombardiers

Once the cadet successfully completed the training at the center, they would be assigned to one of the AAF primary flight schools for initial flying training.

=== Lineage ===
- Established as the 81st Flying Training Wing on 14 October 1943

Activated on 25 August 1943
Disbanded on 1 November 1945

=== Assignments ===
- Army Air Forces Western Flying Training Command, 25 August 1943–30 June 1945

=== Units ===
- Army Air Forces Classification Center, 30 April 1942–1 May 1944
- Army Air Forces Preflight School (Pilot), 30 April 1942–1 May 1944
- 1040th Army Air Forces Base Unit, 1 May 1944–1 November 1945

=== Stations ===
- Santa Ana Army Air Base, California, 25 August 1943–30 June 1945

== See also ==
- Army Air Forces Training Command
- Other Training Command Preflight/classification Units:

74th Flying Training Wing (World War II) Eastern Flying Training Command
78th Flying Training Wing (World War II) Central Flying Training Command

- Other Western Flying Training Command Flight Training Wings:

35th Flying Training Wing (World War II) Basic/Advanced Flight Training (California)
36th Flying Training Wing (World War II) Primary Flight Training
37th Flying Training Wing (World War II) Basic/Advanced Flight Training (Arizona)
38th Flying Training Wing (World War II) Bombardier and Specialized 2/4-Engine Training
