= Aloe Army Airfield =

Airfield in Victoria County, Texas

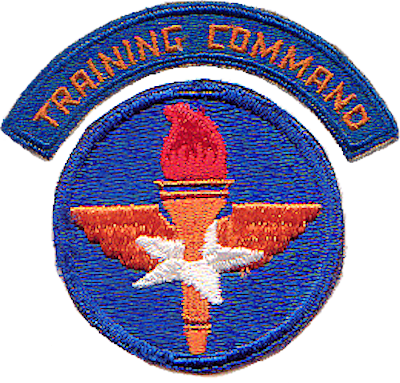
Aloe Army Airfield
- Part of Army Air Forces Flying Training Command
- Victoria County, near Victoria, Texas
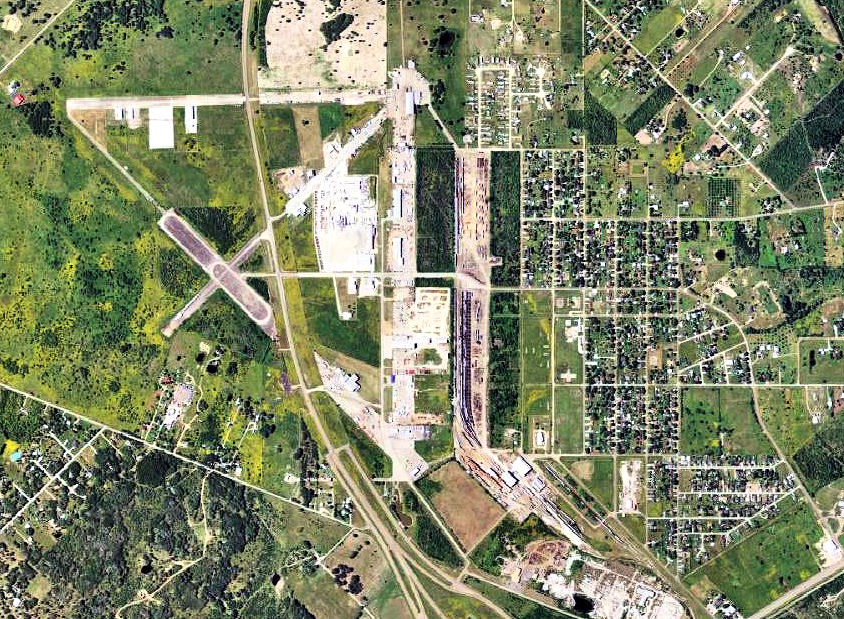
- 2006 USGS Airphoto

Site information
- Type: Military Airfield
- Controlled by: United States Army Air Forces

Location
- Coordinates: 28°46′48″N 97°05′24″W

Site history
- Built: 1942
- In use: 1942–1945

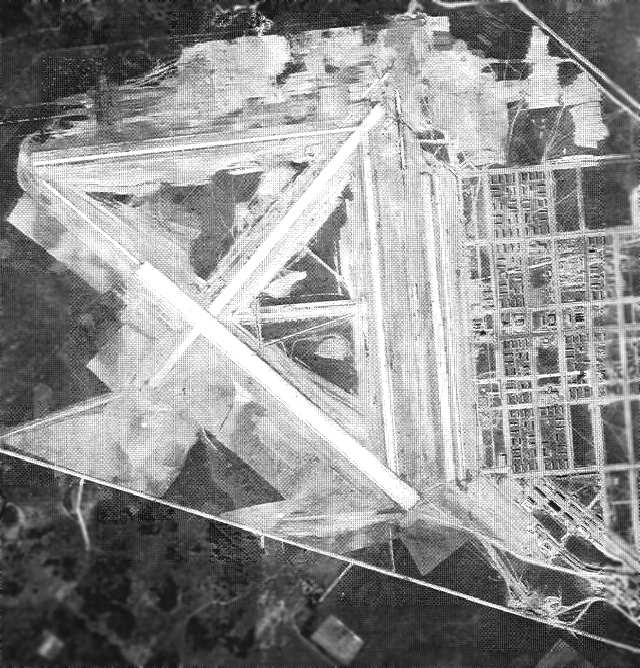
1942 airphoto of the airfield under construction

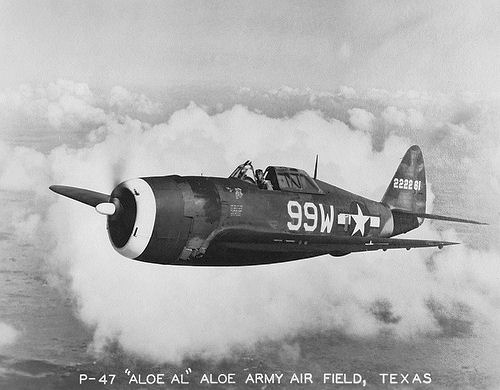
Republic P-47D-RE Thunderbolt (42-22281) from Aloe AAF, about 1943

Aloe Army Airfield is an abandoned airfield located 7 miles (11 km) west of Victoria, Texas.

== History ==
Aloe AAF was established by the United States Army Air Forces as an advanced flying school, first known as Victoria Field #2 on 28 July 1942. It was redesignated as Aloe Army Airfield on 27 October 1942. Its mission was an advanced single-engine training field for fighter pilots. Aloe also became the new home of the Lake Charles Army Flying School, which relocated from Lake Charles, Louisiana.

Its training unit was the 347th Aviation Squadron, which used the North American AT-6 Texan, Curtiss P-40 Warhawk and lastly Republic P-47 Thunderbolts. Cadets were schooled in flying & in ground & aerial gunnery. During its use as a training airfield, Aloe had a total of 4 satellite fields:

- Aloe Aux #7 (7.6 miles northwest of Victoria), of which no trace remains,
- Aloe Aux #8 (4.2 miles south of Goliad), of which no trace remains,
- Aloe Aux #9 (15 miles southwest of Victoria), of which no trace remains,
- Fannin Aux #10 (7.2 miles ENE of Goliad).

Aloe AAF was inactivated on 31 October 1945, and the government made plans to reassign the field as a subpost of Foster Army Air Field near Victoria, but both Aloe & Foster were closed. Aloe AAF was declared surplus by the War Department in 1946 and was turned over to the War Assets Administration for disposal.

Aloe Field, with its 304 buildings, was transferred to Victoria County in 1948, after which the site became Victoria County Airport.

In 1960 the County Airport was moved to Foster Field, and Aloe Field was closed. Victoria County returned the field back to the Federal Government in 1961. The base was declared surplus by the General Services Administration in 1962 & offered for sale.

The land was broken into parcels & sold in April 1963. A portion of the former airfield was purchased in 1963 by a local businessman, who leased a runway on a year-to-year basis to the "Rod Benders", a hot rod club to use the runway for drag races. The club could not make any permanent improvements at the property. They named the facility "Six Flags Drag Way".

In 1968 G.A. Kupfernagel purchased the property which had been used for drag racing, and named it "Six Flags Raceway Park". In 1973 Kupfernagel sold the land & equipment. The new owner continued to operate races at the airfield until the end of 1975, when he sold the land to a developer.

The west side of the airfield (including the runways) has become an industrial park. The east side has become a housing development.

== See also ==
- Texas World War II Army Airfields
- 77th Flying Training Wing (World War II)
