= Santa Ana Army Air Base =

Former military base in Orange County, California

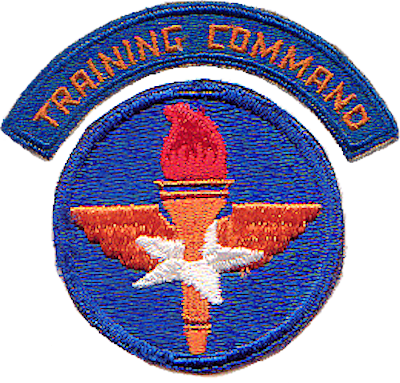
Santa Ana Army Air Base
- Part of Army Air Forces Flying Training Command
- Costa Mesa, Orange County, California, US
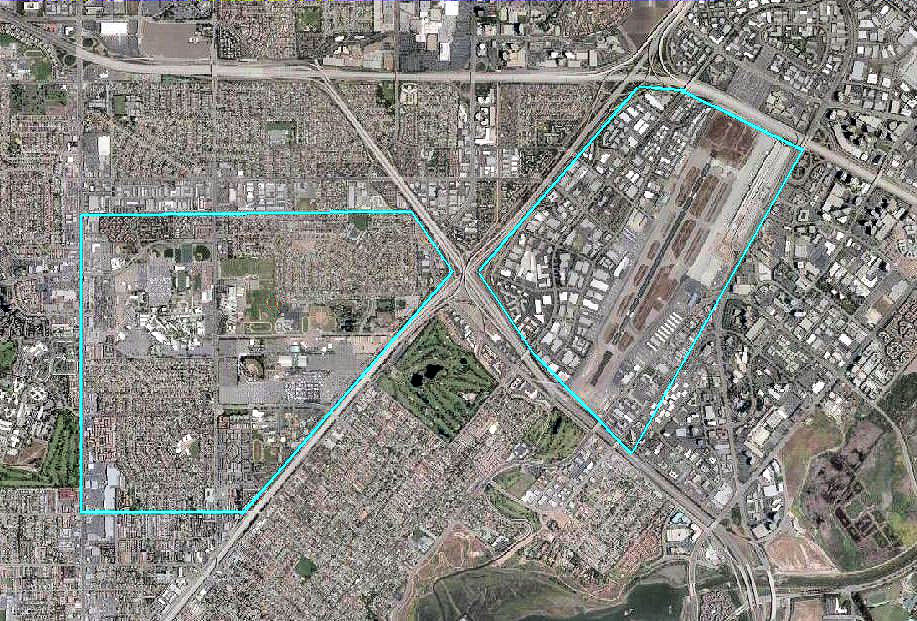
- USGS 2006 airphoto of Santa Ana Army Air Base (Outlined) Santa Ana AAB on left, Orange County Airport on right

Site information
- Type: Non-flying Army Air Force training facility
- Controlled by: United States Army Air Forces

Location
- Location within California
- Coordinates: 33°40′13″N 117°54′09″W

Site history
- Built: 1941
- In use: 1942–1946

Garrison information
- Garrison: Army Air Force Training Command

Santa Ana Army Air Base (SAAAB) was a World War II-era air base located near Santa Ana, California. The air base was decommissioned in 1946, and part of the land was annexed by Costa Mesa in 1953. The air base was used for basic training, although it did not have planes, hangars or runways. The base was 1,336 acres (5.41 km^{2}), and the main section of the base was located between Baker Street to the north, Harbor Boulevard to the west, Wilson Street on the south, and Newport Boulevard on the east. The land formerly occupied by the air base is today the home of John Wayne Airport, the Orange County Fairgrounds, and Orange Coast College.

== Origins and development ==
On 1 January 1942 the United States Army Air Corps activated Santa Ana Army Air Base and established the West Coast Air Corps Training Center at Santa Ana, California. The West Coast Air Corps Training Center at Santa Ana commanded flying training (basic, primary and advanced) at airfields in the Western United States. On 31 July 1943, was redesignated as the Western Flying Training Command.

Santa Ana Army Air Base was an air base without planes, hangars or runways. The original locations were at Maxwell Field, Montgomery, Alabama, Randolph Field, San Antonio, Texas and Moffett Field, Sunnyvale, California. These three Centers were to train a total of 7,000 pilots per year. However the national program was increased to 30,000 pilots per year in August 1940. Many contract training schools were started to help fill this quota.

In February 1941, the Army initiated three Air Corps Replacement Training Centers. These were induction centers for new recruits entering the Army Air Corps with no military experience. Each center was to provide for the classification and preflight instruction for pilots, navigators and bombardiers. The locations were to be at existing air corps facilities. This was the case except for the West Coast Air Corps Training Center at Moffett Field, near Sunnyvale, California. The United States Navy wanted to use the field exclusively for its lighter than air "blimp" base so the Army Air Corps had to look elsewhere for a new facility. A search of sites in southern California was conducted. The City Council of Santa Ana wanted the new center located near it so they arranged to lease a 409-acre site for $6,400 per year from M. H. Whittier Co. Ltd. with an option to buy at $500 per acre. The government could sublet from the city for $1 per year. The Army selected the Santa Ana site on 16 June 1941. The City leased the land on 21 August 1941.

=== National Training Center ===
Santa Ana Army Air Base (SAAAB) was a huge basic training camp. Plans were also made to move the entire Army Air Force administrative offices at Moffett Field to the Santa Ana area.

Santa Ana Army Air Base California 1943 Classbook

The master plan called for the construction of 145 buildings that would include: 79 barracks, 3 warehouses, quartermaster supply office, 4 school buildings, 10 administration buildings, 13 day rooms, 13 supply rooms, 4 cadet messes, 2 officers' quarters, a motor repair shop, post office, gasoline service station, utility buildings, theater, 2 recreation buildings, commissary buildings, chapels, dispatchers' office, officers' mess, fire station, guard house, two post exchanges, and a 151-bed hospital and all utilities. This would amount to a new city in the middle of bean and tomato fields. The construction contract for the 177 buildings at SAAAB was awarded to the Griffith Company on 24 October 1941 for $2 million. The work was to be completed in 120 calendar days

The Base would not have a flying field as a part of its facilities. It would receive air cadets from civilian life and give them basic ground training prior to their advancement to one of the contract primary aviation schools for flight training.

The Orange County Airport was also selected as the site for the Headquarters Squadron originally located at Moffett Field. Arrangements were also made for the Air Corps lease five acres of land for a small facility at the adjacent airport to serve as a sort of "taxi service" for the Army Air Force officials to permit them to contact various points of flying activity along the West Coast.

The first set of buildings was completed on 15 May 1942; however, the officers and men began to move into the base on 16 February 1942. General Orders No. 14 made it official on 3 March 1942. The base grew rapidly as the need for pilots and air crews skyrocketed. Newly inducted soldiers, earmarked for the Army Air Forces, were given 9 weeks of basic training and then testing to determine if they were to be pilots, bombardiers, navigators, mechanics, etc. From SAAAB, they went on to other bases for training in their specialties. It planned to accommodate 2,500 to 3,000 cadets, 83 officers and 806 enlisted men, and to cost about $3.2 million to construct.

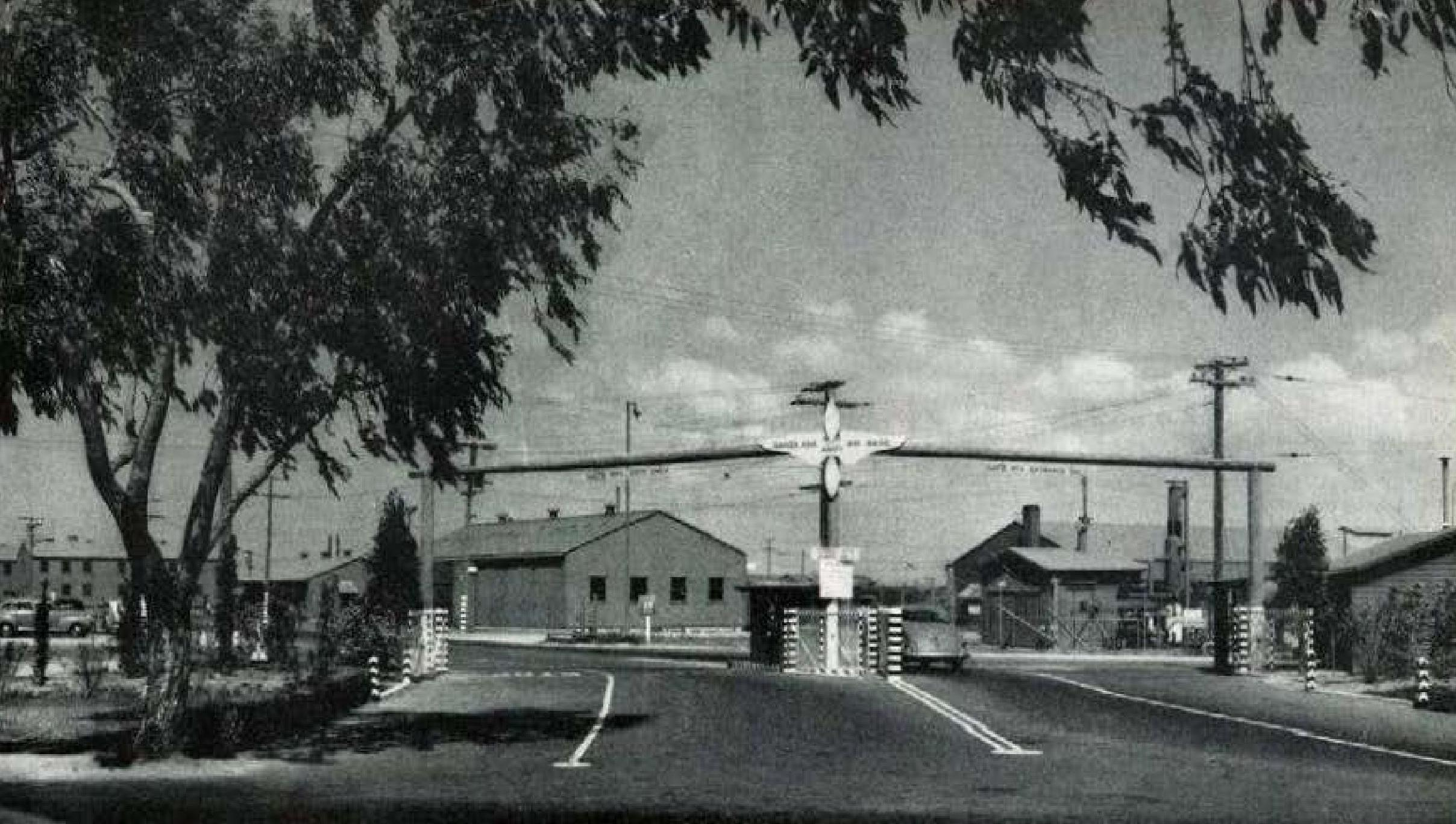
Base gate in 1943

The first group of 50 cadets arrived on 20 February 1942. On 25 February 1942 the headquarters and headquarters squadron with its enlisted men and approximately 2,000 cadets arrived to begin training. By March there were 5,000 cadets on the base. Cadets lived in tents until the new barracks could be completed. Instruction began in March for a nine-week course. In May 1942 the base was organized into wings, groups and squadrons. A wing consisted of ten squadrons, divided into two groups. A squadron usually had about 180 men. This was broken into flights and then squads. The first class of 2,601 cadets graduated on 1 July 1942. By the end of 1942 the annual rate of graduates from the Pilot School was over 45,000. To carry out this program, the Air Force had recruited a faculty of over 250 well-trained and experienced high school, college and university teachers who later became officers in the Air Corps.

In the fall of 1942, SAAAB became an overseas replacement depot (ORD) housing Army Air Forces personnel awaiting transportation overseas. Turnover was rapid so that by the end of the year 23,470 soldiers had passed through SAAAB. By the end of 1943 that number jumped to 57,895. The base reached its maximum strength by the fall of 1943, with a population of some 26,000 servicemen. In November 1943 members of the Women's Air Service Pilots (WASP) began training at the base, followed shortly by members of the Women's Army Corps (WAC).

Being close to Hollywood and with such a large turnover of service personnel, the base attracted a lot of Hollywood celebrities who put on shows at the base.

Preflight training at the SAAAB peaked in the latter part of 1943. Pilot class 44D, the largest, completed training in October 1943. By then, the Army Air Forces had enough aircrews for the foreseeable future. On 31 May 1944 aircrew classification ceased at the SAAAB, only about two years since it began. The Pilot School closed on 22 May 1944. It had received 73,923 cadets and graduated 70,464 for flying schools. By the end of 1944 most pilot training schools were being closed by the Army Air Forces.

On 1 November 1944 the SAAAB was turned over to the Army Air Forces Personnel Distribution Command with General Arthur E. Easterbrook in command. At the time it had 800 buildings on the base. Most of the remaining cadets were sent to San Antonio, Texas. From its inception until this transfer the SAAAB Classification Center had received 149,425 men. Of that total, 82,252 were classified as pilots, 21,842 as bombardiers and 14,230 as navigators. Classification eliminated 28,388 to ground crew and 188 to radio operator school. At its close 2,525 remained unclassified.

7 May 1945 V-E day was the close of the fighting in Europe. Suddenly SAAAB's role changed 180 degrees and it worked around the clock to become a separation center. By November 1945 81,000 combat veterans had been returned to private life. In late 1945 Japanese aliens from the alien internment camps being returned to Japan by the Immigrations and Naturalization Service (INS) were housed here while awaiting transportation to Japan

Finally on 13 March 1946 the Army deactivated the SAAAB. On 4 May 1946 the title to the SAAAB passed from the Army to the War Assets Administration. The federal government sold a 76-acre chunk of the land, including a rail spur and some warehouses, back to the Segerstrom family who originally owned the property.

=== Major units assigned ===
- Army Air Forces West Coast Training Center
- Army Air Forces Classification Center
- 414th Air Base Squadron
- Aviation Cadet Squadron 72
- 554th Pre-Flight Training Squadron
- 674th Classification Center Squadron
- 1040th Army Air Forces Base Unit (Redistribution Station #4)

== Postwar use ==
In the ensuing years some of the buildings on the base were sold and moved piecemeal, others became part of colleges. In 1953 the City of Costa Mesa was incorporated. In June 1955, the former SAAAB property was annexed to the city. A mess hall from the base was sold and moved to Cook's Corner, where it stands today.

A road inside the base which ran parallel to the then two-lane Newport Boulevard was repurposed as Newport's southbound lanes, with the empty strip of land between the two roads later being used to construct the CA-55 freeway.

For a period of time in the mid-1950s a portion of the Base served as a Nike guided missile training base. The three-battery missile compound had been made operational in January 1956. Two years later, in June 1958, the Air National Guard received a five-acre parcel of land and the remaining 260 acres, including the five-acre air base water facility, was declared surplus and turned over to the GSA.

Much of the land that was the SAAAB is now the Orange County Fairgrounds, Orange Coast College, Vanguard University, and Costa Mesa High School.

On 29 June 1979, a plaque was dedicated to "all pilots, bombardiers and navigators who trained here that contributed to an early victory in World War II". This plaque was placed on the Air National Guard base, which is the last active duty post on the original location of the SAAAB.

== In popular culture ==
In literature, Santa Ana Army Air Base is notable as being one of the two main settings for the novel Catch-22 by Joseph Heller, and subsequent film and television adaptations of the book. Heller acknowledges at the beginning of the novel that he has heavily fictionalized the other main setting – the Italian island of Pianosa – suggesting that SAAAB is depicted more realistically.

== See also ==
- California World War II Army Airfields
- 81st Flying Training Wing (World War II)
- California during World War II
