= 79th Flying Training Wing (U.S. Army Air Forces) =

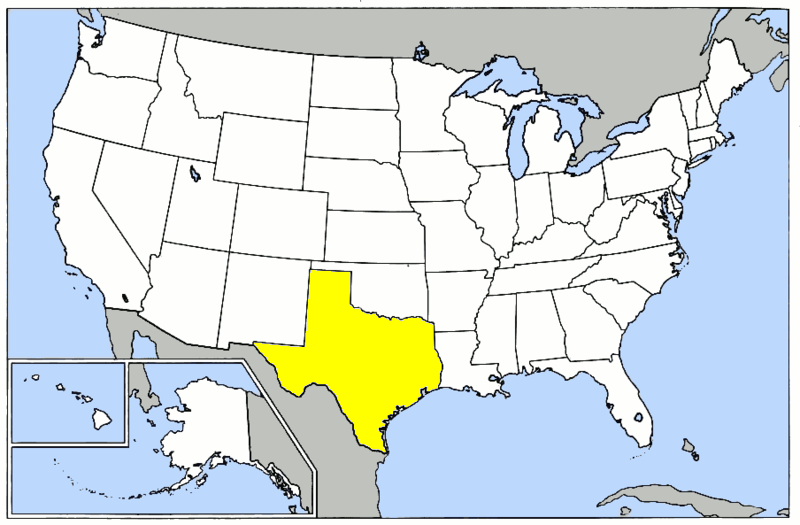
- Locations of airfields controlled by the 79th Flying Training Wing
- Active: 1943–1946
- Country: United States
- Branch: United States Army Air Forces
- Type: Command and Control
- Role: Training
- Part of: Army Air Forces Training Command
- Engagements: World War II: World War II American Theater

The 79th Flying Training Wing was a unit of the United States Army Air Forces. It was last assigned to the Eastern Flying Training Command, and was disbanded on 16 June 1946 at Midland Army Airfield, Texas.

It has no lineage link with any current USAF unit.

== History ==
As a gunnery training wing, both enlisted flexible gunnery schools for bomber-crew defensive gunners, and pilot-training, fixed-gunnery schools were included. After graduation, air cadets were commissioned as second lieutenants, received their "wings", and were reassigned to operational or replacement training units operated by one of the four numbered air forces in the zone of interior.

=== Lineage ===
- Established as 79th Flying Training Wing on 14 August 1943

Activated on 25 August 1943
Disbanded on 30 December 1945

=== Assignments ===
- Army Air Forces Central Flying Training Command, 25 August 1943
- Army Air Forces Eastern Flying Training Command, 15 October-30 December 1945

=== Training aircraft ===
The schools of the wing used Beechcraft AT-11 and Lockheed AT-18s for airborne gunnery trainers. Trainee gunners fired at modified AT-6s and Bell RP-39Qs with nonpiercing ammunition that would break apart on contact. Also, older, noncombat-suitable B-24 Liberators and B-17 Flying Fortresses were used in the latter part of training.

Fixed gunnery training at Matagorda Island used North American AT-6s to attack fixed targets on the range with machine guns and concrete practice bombs.

=== Assigned schools ===
Harlingen Army Airfield, Harlingen, Texas
AAF Gunnery School (Flexible)
93d Flexible Gunnery Training Group
Opened: January 1942, closed: February 1946 (AT-6, AT-11, AT-18, B-24, RP-39Q)
Used modified AT-6s (later RP-39Qs) as air gunnery targets; closed February 1946; reopened as Harlingen Air Force Base, 1950; closed 1962
Laredo Army Airfield, Laredo, Texas
AAF Gunnery School (Flexible)
2d Aerial Gunnery Training Group
Opened: April 1942, Closed: November 1945 (AT-6, AT-11, AT-18, B-17, B-24, RP-39Q)
Used modified AT-6s (later RP-39Qs) as air gunnery targets; closed November 1945; reopened as Laredo Air Force Base, 1950; closed 1974

Matagorda Island General Bombing and Gunnery Range, Matagorda Island, Texas
AAF Gunnery School (Fixed)
62d Single Engine Flying Training Group (856th, 857th, 858th, 859th) Single-Engine Gunnery Squadrons
Opened: June 1942, Closed: April 1945 (AT-6)
Also known as Matagorda Peninsula Army Airfield; Sub-Field of Foster Field, Texas

=== Stations ===
- Harlingen Army Airfield, Texas, 25 August 1943
- Maxwell Field, Alabama, 15 October–30 December 1945
