= 48th Flying Training Squadron =

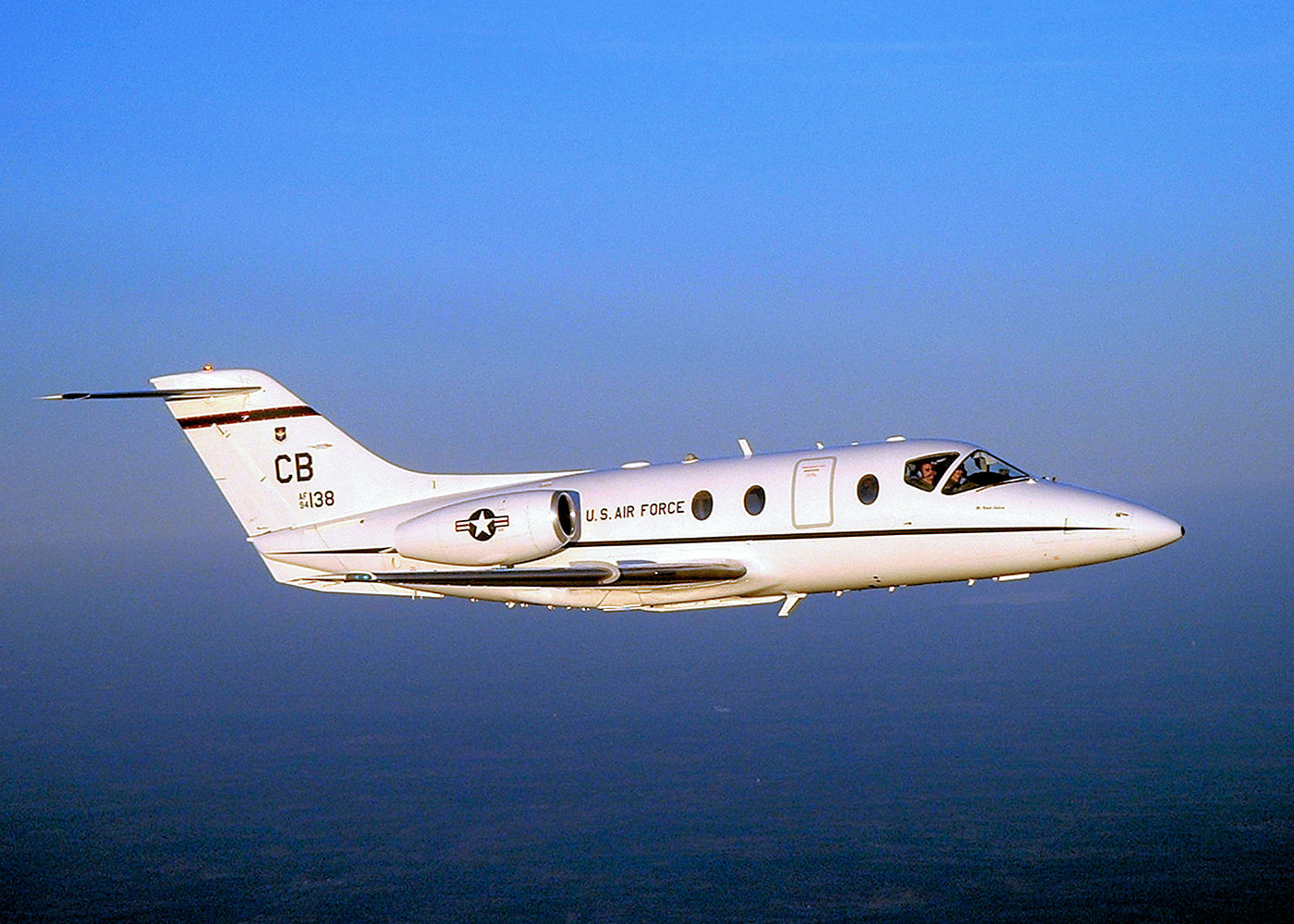
- 48th Flying Training Squadron T-1A Jayhawk (Note: Aircraft is Beech Raytheon T-1A Jayhawk, serial 94-0138.)
- Active: 1917–1919; 1927–1931; 1933–1936; 1941–1945; 1946–1949; 1952–1991; 1996–present
- Country: United States
- Branch: United States Air Force
- Type: Squadron
- Role: Pilot Training
- Part of: Air Education and Training Command
- Garrison/HQ: Columbus Air Force Base, Mississippi
- Nickname: Alley Cats
- Engagements: World War I; Occupation of the Rhineland; EAME Theater World War II

- Decorations: Distinguished Unit Citation; Air Force Outstanding Unit Award: Distinguished Unit Citation; Air Force Outstanding Unit Award (12x)

Commanders
- Current commander: Lt Col Cory Halvorson

Insignia
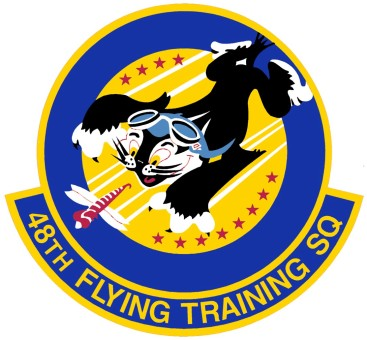
- 48th Flying Training Squadron emblem (Note: Reintroduced 29 May 1987, modified 8 August 1996.)

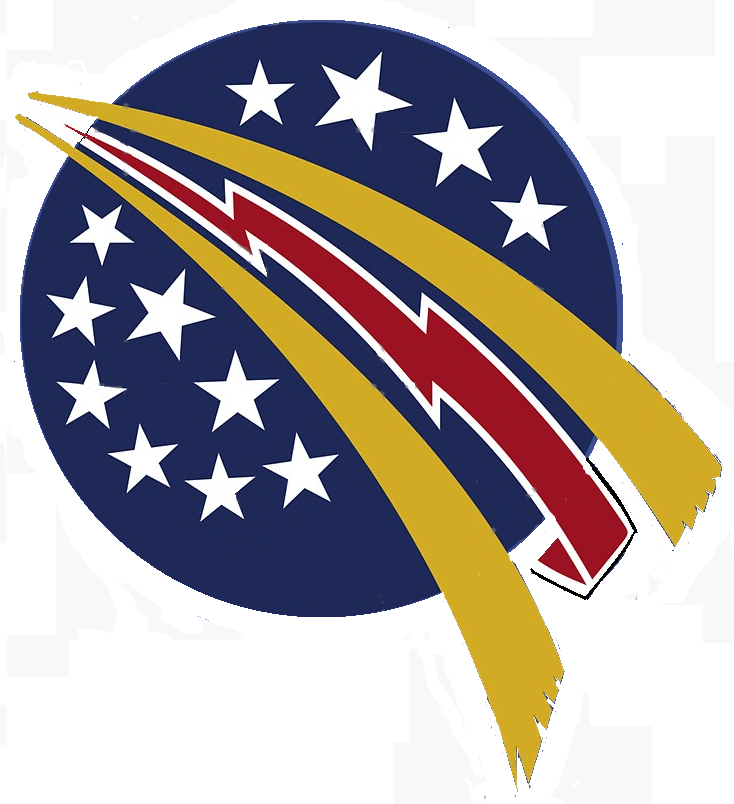
- 48th Fighter-Interceptor Squadron emblem (Note: Approved 5 June 1953. Description: On and over a blue sphere a red flash fimbriated in white between two yellow flight trails issuing from lower left [ sinister ] to upper right [ dexter ] between four white stars in chief and eight white stars in base.)

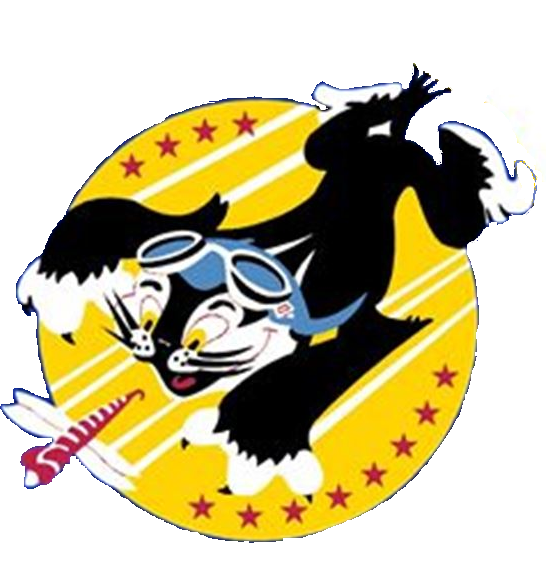
- 48th Fighter Squadron emblem (World War II)

The 48th Flying Training Squadron is part of the 14th Flying Training Wing based at Columbus Air Force Base, Mississippi. It operates T-1 Jayhawk aircraft conducting flight training. The squadron is one of the oldest in the Air Force, being formed during World War I as the 48th Aero Squadron on 4 August 1917.

Currently the squadron specializes in the tanker and airlift track of specialized undergraduate pilot training. Students receive at least 159 hours of flight instruction in the Raytheon T-1 Jayhawk where they learn air refueling procedures, tactical navigation, airdrop, and advanced navigation. Upon completion of this phase, students earn the aeronautical rating of pilot and receive their Air Force wings.

== History ==
=== World War I ===
The squadron's origins date to 4 August 1917 with the formation of the 48th Aero Squadron at Kelly Field, Texas. It was organized into the first Aero construction squadron designated for deployment to the American Expeditionary Forces in France. After basic training at Kelly Field, the squadron was sent to the Aviation Concentration Center, Garden City, New York in mid-September 1917 for subsequent movement to France. It embarked on the Cunard Liner SS Pannonia, suffering a stormy and unpleasant voyage across the Atlantic. It arrived at Liverpool, England on 29 October. After a few days in England, the squadron arrived at Rest Camp No. 2, Le Havre, France on 1 November.

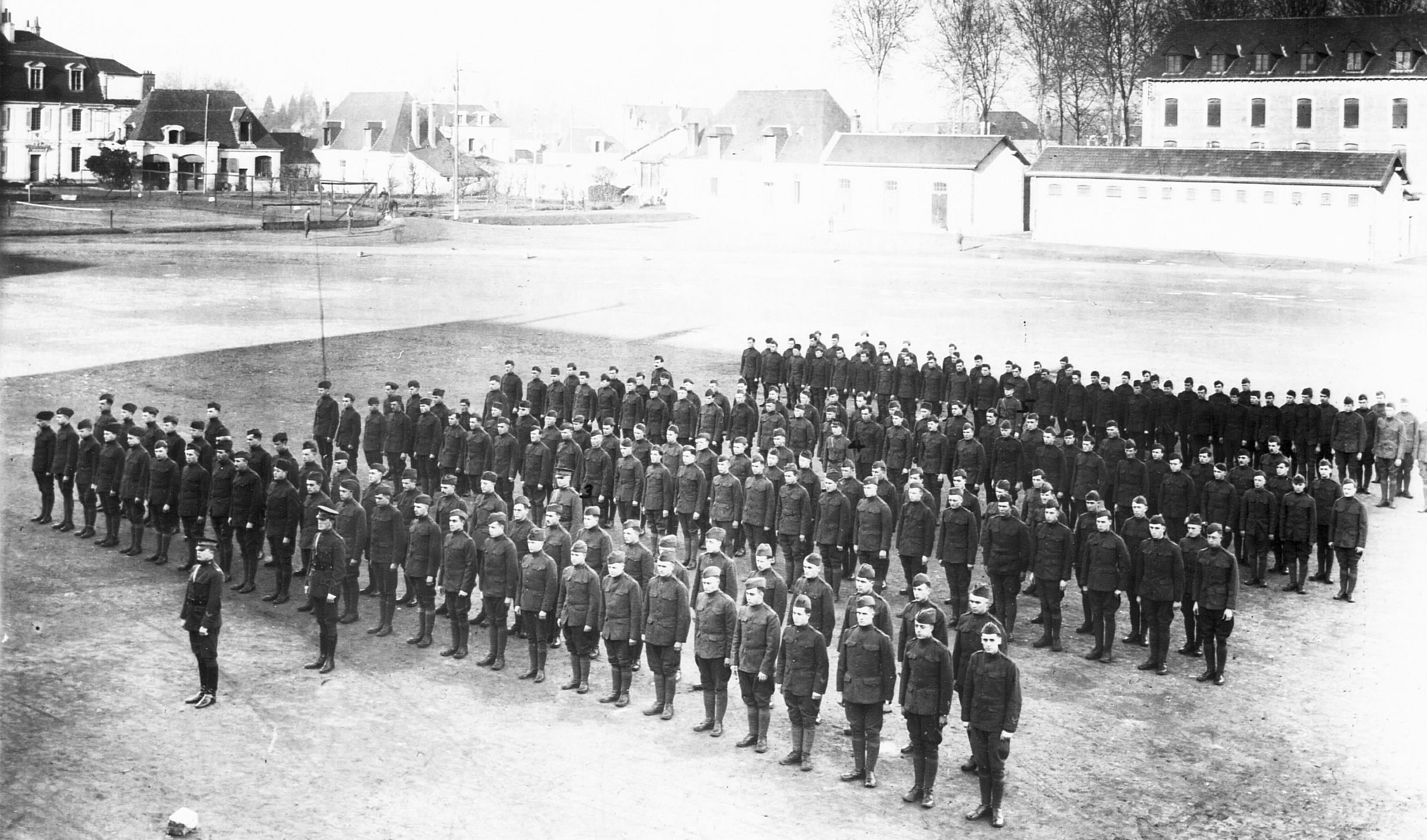
Formation of the 462d Aero Squadron, probably taken in Germany during the summer of 1919 just prior to its demobilization

The first meaningful work of the squadron was at the Third Aviation Instruction Center, Issoudun Aerodrome in Central France. It arrived on 3 November to help construct barracks and shops from lumber. It also erected hangars and did the necessary construction work to bring the airfield into an operational school for training pursuit (fighter) pilots. It also began work on six airfields to support the training school, building roads, putting up hangars, and installing water and electrical systems. A detachment of the squadron was sent to the Second Aviation Instruction Center, Tours Aerodrome. In doing this work, the squadron got the reputation of being one of the best, and fastest, all around construction squadrons in the AEF.

In May 1918, the squadron was then reassigned to the First Army Air Service, and began constructing combat airfields to support the St. Mihiel Offensive. Throughout the year, it was moved from place to place, erecting hangars, constructing buildings and preparing airfields for use by Air Service planes. At Parois Aerodrome in the Meuse, it constructed 12 hangars and 23 barracks, the flying field being full of former trenches and shell holes that had to be filled in. During the Meuse-Argonne Offensive in early November, it moved to Buzancy to reconstruct a former German airfield that was littered with munitions and other hazardous materiel. However, the war ended on 11 November before the airfield could be put to use.

After the armistice, the squadron was reassigned to the Third Army Air Service and moved to Trier Airdrome, Germany as part of the Army of Occupation. The former German Airfield there was prepared for seven American Aero Squadrons to use, which was done in less than a week. It then moved to Weißenthurm to construct another Aerodrome for Third Army. It remained in the Rhineland until the summer of 1919 until it was ordered, along with the Third Army Air Service to demobilized. After turning in all equipment at the 1st Air Depot at Colombey-les-Belles Aerodrome, the unit moved to a channel port where it boarded a troop ship, returning to the United States in August 1919. The men of the squadron were discharged and returned to civilian life.

=== Inter-war period ===
The 48th School Squadron was activated in 1927 as part of the 11th School Group at Kelly Field, Texas. A part of the Air Corps Primary Flying School, it trained aviation cadets using the Consolidated PT-1, with tandem seats and a Wright E engine. In 1930, the squadron was consolidated with the 462d Aero Squadron.

By the fall of 1931, construction of Randolph Field was essentially completed, and the primary flying school at Kelly Field was moved to the new installation. With the transfer of the school, the 48th School Squadron was inactivated on 31 December 1931 It was activated again at the Air Corps Technical School at Chanute Field, Illinois in August 1933. In March 1935, the squadron became the 48th Pursuit Squadron, but it was inactivated in September 1936 and disbanded on 1 January 1938.

=== World War II ===
A new 48th Pursuit Squadron was activated in January 1941. The squadron was equipped with Lockheed P-38 Lightnings in 1941 and assigned to Hamilton Field, California. From 5 February to 3 June 1942 it flew air defense patrols along the California coast. Redesignated the 48th Fighter Squadron, it was deployed to the European Theater of Operations in August 1942 to fly escort missions for Boeing B-17 Flying Fortress and Consolidated B-24 Liberator heavy bombers as part of VIII Fighter Command.

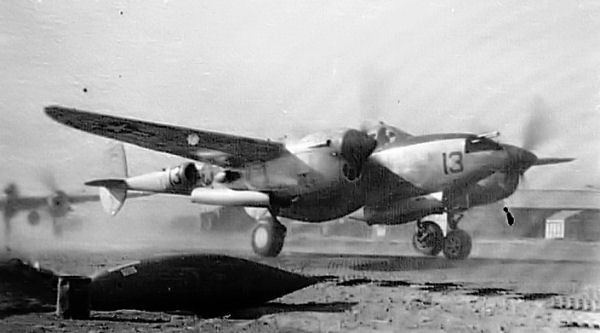
P-38 of the 48th Fighter Squadron – Taken in North Africa

The squadron was sent to North Africa in late 1942 as part of the Operation Torch invasion forces, taking up station in Algeria. It was reassigned to the Twelfth Air Force and flew fighter escort missions for the Flying Fortresses operating from Algeria as well as tactical interdiction strikes on enemy targets of opportunity in Algeria and Tunisia during the North African Campaign.

Following the German defeat and withdrawal from North Africa the squadron participated in the Allied invasions of Sicily and Italy and the subsequent drive of the United States Fifth Army up the Italian peninsula. It was engaged primarily in tactical operations after November 1943, supporting ground forces and attacking enemy targets of opportunity such as railroads, road convoys, bridges, strafing enemy airfields and other targets. The squadron was deployed to Corsica in 1944 to attack enemy targets in support of the Free French Forces in the liberation of the island and to support Allied forces in the invasion of southern France. The squadron continued offensive operations until the German capitulation in May 1945. The unit was inactivated in the fall 1945 in Italy.

=== Cold War Air Defense ===
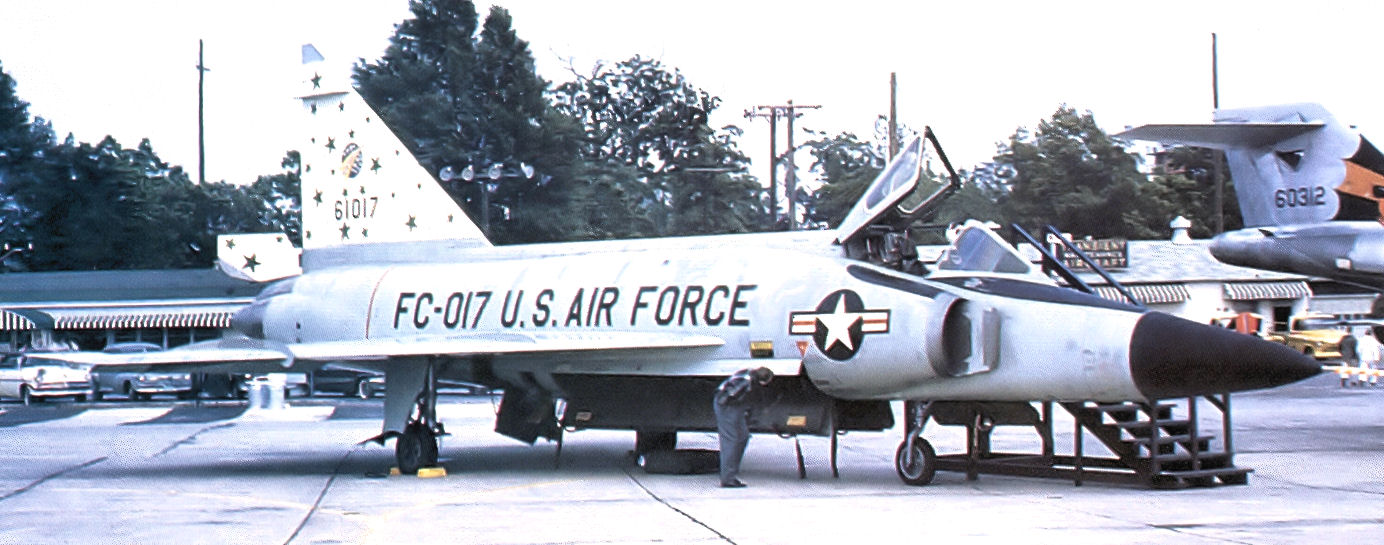
Convair F-102A-55-CO Delta Dagger 56-1017, about 1959

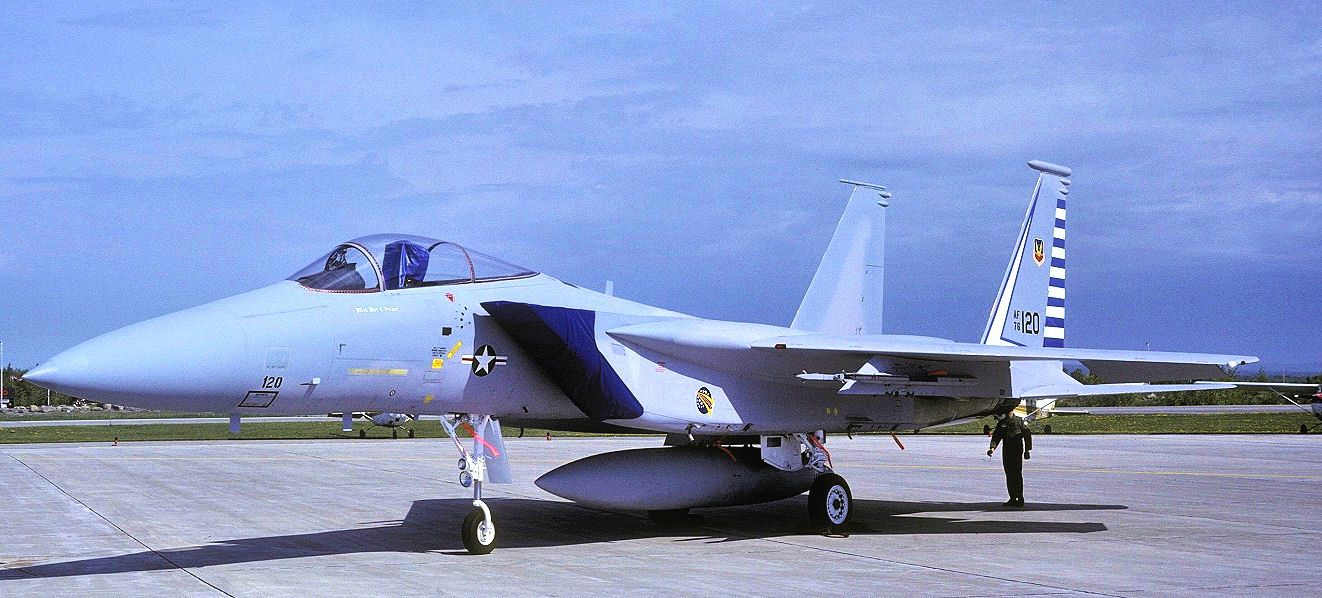
48th Fighter-Interceptor Squadron- F-15 – Langley AFB

It was reactivated in 1946 as part of Air Defense Command to perform air defense of the eastern United States. the squadron was activated at Dow Field in November 1946 with Republic P-47 Thunderbolts. In October 1947 a transition into Republic P-84B Thunderjets was completed. These were flown until the unit was temporarily inactivated on 2 October 1949.

The squadron was redesignated the 48th Fighter-Interceptor Squadron and reactivated in November 1952 at Grenier Air Force Base, New Hampshire, with F-47 Thunderbolts, replacing the New Hampshire Air National Guard's 133d Fighter-Interceptor Squadron, which was released from federal control. A relocation to Langley Air Force Base was completed in early 1953 along with a transition into F-84Gs and then Lockheed F-94C Starfires in the fall of 1953. In the summer of 1957 the squadron completed a transition into Convair F-102A Delta Daggers followed by another in the fall of 1960 to Convair F-106 Delta Darts. It deployed to Florida in 1962 during Cuban Missile Crisis.

The 48th flew McDonnell Douglas F-15A Eagles from 1982 to 1991, when many of the F-15 were transferred to the Missouri and Hawaii Air National Guard, and 3 or 4 going to Aerospace Maintenance and Regeneration Center. The 48th continued training and operational exercises until inactivation in 1991.

== Lineage ==
462d Aero Squadron

- Organized as the 48th Aero Squadron on 4 August 1917

Redesignated 435th Aero Squadron on 1 February 1918
Redesignated 462d Aero Squadron (Construction) on 3 March 1918
Demobilized on 11 August 1919

- Reconstituted and consolidated with the 48th School Squadron in 1930

48th Pursuit Squadron

- Constituted as the 48th School Squadron on 6 February 1923

Activated on 1 August 1927
Consolidated with the 462d Aero Squadron in 1930
Inactivated on 1 September 1931

- Activated on 1 August 1933

Redesignated 48th Pursuit Squadron on 1 March 1935
Inactivated on 1 September 1936
Disbanded on 1 January 1938

- Reconstituted and consolidated with the 48th Fighter-Interceptor Squadron in 1956

48th Flying Training Squadron

- Constituted as the 48th Pursuit Squadron (Fighter) on 20 November 1940

Activated on 15 January 1941
Redesignated 48th Fighter Squadron (Twin Engine) on 15 May 1942
Redesignated 48th Fighter Squadron, Two Engine on 28 February 1944
Inactivated on 9 September 1945

- Redesignated 48th Fighter Squadron, Jet-Propelled and activated on 20 November 1946

Redesignated 48th Fighter Squadron, Jet on 26 July 1948
Inactivated on 2 October 1949

- Redesignated 48th Fighter-Interceptor Squadron on 11 September 1952

Activated on 1 November 1952

- Consolidated with the 48th Pursuit Squadron in 1956

Inactivated on 31 December 1991

- Redesignated 48th Flying Training Squadron on 25 April 1996

Activated on 1 July 1996

=== Assignments ===
- Unknown, 4 August 1917 (Note: Probably assigned to Post Headquarters, Kelly Field while at Kelly and possibly to the Aviation Concentration Center at Mineola.)
- Third Aviation Instruction Center, November 1917 (detachment with Second Aviation Instruction Center, December 1917 – April 1918)
- Advance Section, Service of Supply, April 1918
- First Army Air Service, August 1918 (Note: Robertson and Maurer in Combat Squadrons each indicate the squadron was assigned directly to the headquarters of the numbered army. However, each had an intermediate headquarters for its aviation units.)
- Third Army Air Service, November 1918 – June 1919
- Unknown, until 11 August 1919
- 10th School Group, 1 August 1927
- 24th School Wing, 15 July–1 September 1931
- Air Corps Technical School, 1 August 1933
- 3d Wing, 1 March 1935 – 1 September 1936 (attached to Air Corps Technical School)
- 14th Pursuit Group (later 14th Fighter Group), 15 January 1941 – 9 September 1945
- 14th Fighter Group, 20 November 1946 – 2 October 1949
- 4707th Defense Wing, 1 November 1952
- 4710th Defense Wing (later 4710th Air Defense Wing), 14 January 1953
- 85th Air Division, 1 March 1956
- Washington Air Defense Sector, 1 September 1958
- 33d Air Division, 1 April 1966
- 20th Air Division, 19 November 1969
- 23d Air Division, 1 March 1983
- First Air Force, 1 July 1987
- Southeast Air Defense Sector, 1 December 1987 – 31 December 1991
- 14th Operations Group, 1 July 1996 – present)

=== Stations ===
- Kelly Field, Texas, 4 August 1917
- Mineola, New York, 21 September–13 October 1917
- Issoudun Aerodrome, France, 4 November 1917 (detachment at Tours Aerodrome, France 2 December 1917 – 15 April 1918)
- Delouze Aerodrome, France, 29 April 1918
- Vaucouleurs Aerodrome, France, 20 August 1918 (detachment at Bovee)
- Bulainville (for Pretz-en-Argonne Airdrome ?), France, 17 September 1918
- Vadelaincourt, France (191 September 1918 (detachment at Foucaucourt Aerodrome)
- Lisle-en-Barrois Aerodrome, France, 21 September 1918 (detachment at Foucaucourt Aerodrome)
- Parois Aerodrome, France, 6 October 1918
- Buzancy Aerodrome, France, 6 November 1918)
- Mercy-le-Haut, France, 20 November 1918
- Trier Aerodrome, Germany, c. 2 December 1918
- Weißenthurm, Germany, c. January 1919 – 1919
- Mitchel Field, New York, c. 29 July–11 August 1919
- Kelly Field, Texas, 1 August 1927 – 1 September 1931
- Chanute Field, Illinois, 1 August 1933 – 1 September 1936
- Hamilton Field, California, 15 January 1941
- March Field, California, 10 June 1941 – 20 July 1942 (operated From: San Diego, California, 5 February-3 June 1942)
- RAF Atcham, England, 18 August–28 October 1942
- Tafaraoui Airfield, Algeria, 11 November 1942
- Maison Blanche Airport, 16 November 1942
- Youks-les-Bains Airfield, Algeria, 20 November 1942
- Berteaux Airfield, Algeria, 5 January 1943
- Mediouna Airfield, French Morocco, 28 February 1943
- Telergma Airfield, Algeria, 6 May 1943
- El Bathan Airfield, Tunisia, 3 June 1943
- Sainte Marie du Zit Airfield, Tunisia, 25 July 1943 (operated From: Sicily, Italy 6–18 September 1943)
- Triolo Airfield, Italy, 12 December 1943
- Lesina Airfield, Italy, September–9 September 1945
- Dow Field (later (Dow Air Force Base), Maine, 20 November 1946 – 2 October 1949
- Grenier Air Force Base, New Hampshire, 1 November 1952
- Langley Air Force Base, Virginia, 14 January 1953 – 31 December 1991
- Columbus Air Force Base, Mississippi, 1 July 1996– present)

=== Aircraft ===
- A-3 (1935–1936)
- O-1 (1935–1936)
- O-19 (1935–1936)
- P-12 (1935–1936)
- P-26 Peashooter (1935–1936)
- P-40 Warhawk (1941)
- P-66 Vanguard (1941)
- P-43 Lancer (1941)–
- Lockheed P-38 Lightning (1941–1945)
- Republic P-47 (later F-47) Thunderbolt (1946–1949, 1952)
- F-84G Thunderjet (1947–1949, 1953)
- F-94C Starfire (1953–1957)
- F-102 Delta Dagger (1957–1960)
- F-106 Delta Dart (1960–1982)
- F-15 Eagle (1981–1991)
- T-1 Jayhawk (1996–present)

== See also ==
- List of American aero squadrons
- List of United States Air Force Aerospace Defense Command Interceptor Squadrons
