= Flying Division, Air Training Command =

Former US military unit

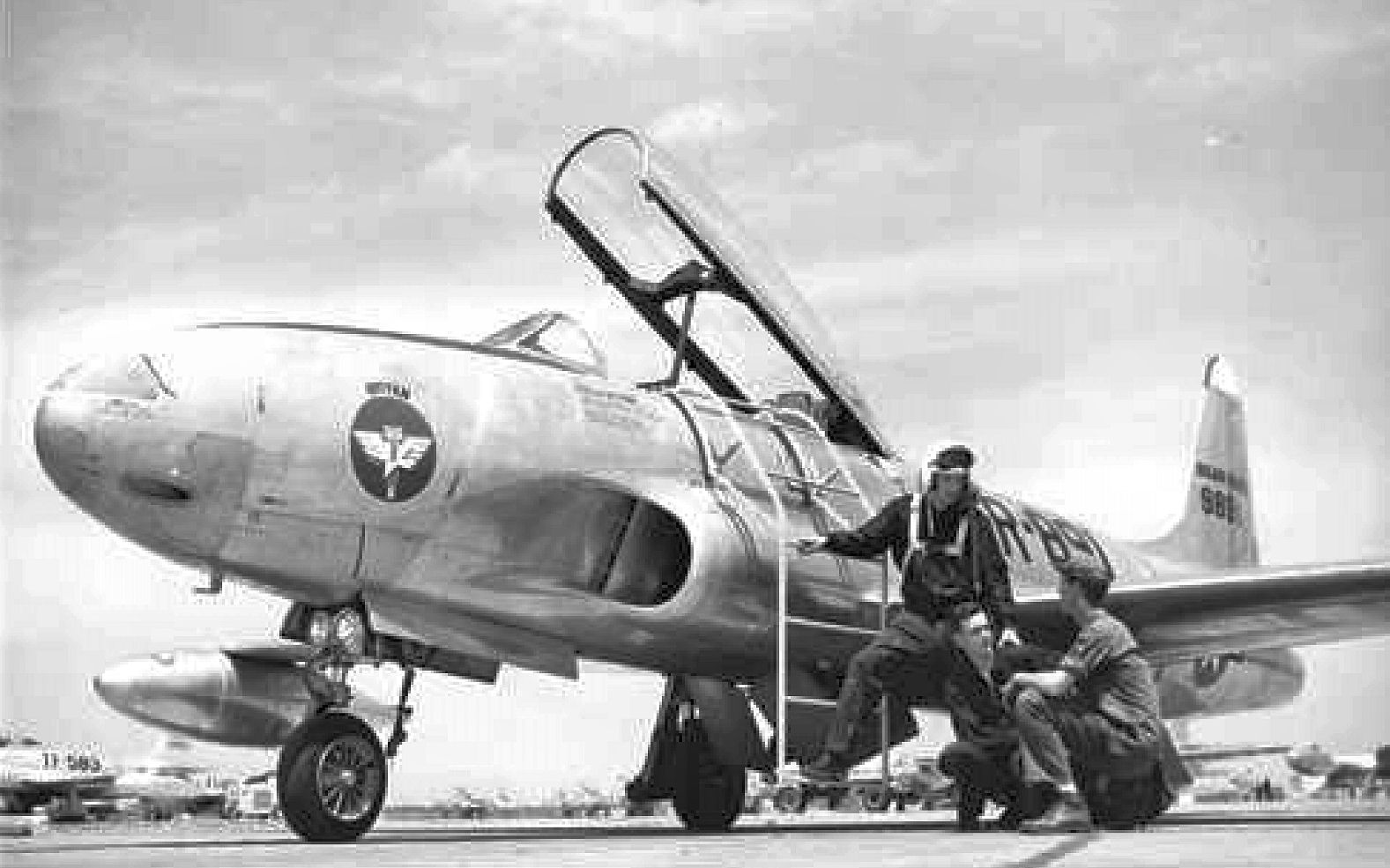
- Postwar T-33A Shooting Star jet fighter training
- Active: 1926–1949
- Disbanded: 14 November 1949
- Country: United States
- Branch: U.S. Army Air Forces; United States Air Force
- Type: Command and Control
- Role: Training
- Size: Command
- Part of: AAF Training Command; Air Training Command
- Motto: Ut Viri Volent
- Colors: Ultramarine blue and golden orange
- Engagements: World War II – American Campaign

Insignia
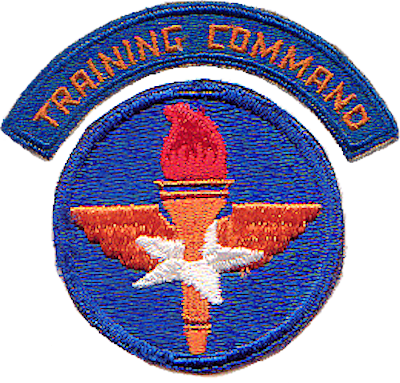
- Shoulder sleeve insignia

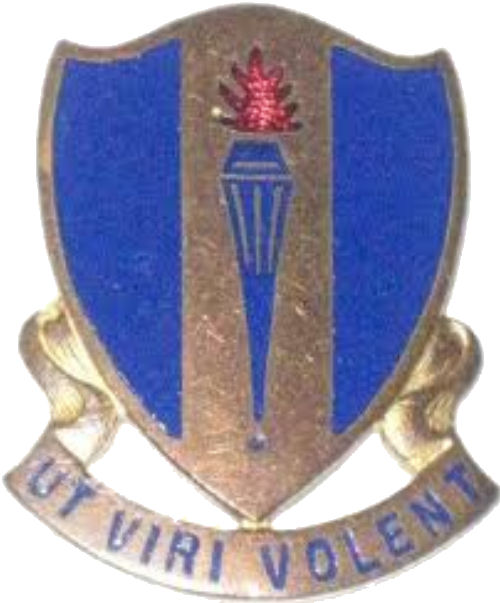
- Distinctive unit insignia

The Flying Division, Air Training Command, was a training formation of the United States Air Force. The unit was established in 1926 as the Air Corps Training Center to be the primary pilot training center for the Air Corps. It was reorganized into one of three training commands created by the Office of the Chief of the Air Corps in 1940 to accommodate the large number of air cadets being recruited as a result of the expansion of the corps after the fall of France. During World War II, thousands of cadets attended various flight schools throughout the Central United States being trained as pilots for fighters, bombers and transports. It also trained the navigators, bombardiers and gunners necessary for the bombers to attack enemy targets in the combat areas overseas. After World War II, it became the primary pilot and aircrew training unit of the United States Air Force Air Training Command.

== History ==
With the demobilization of the Air Service after World War I, the Army's air arm remained quite small during most of the interwar period.

=== Army Air Service ===
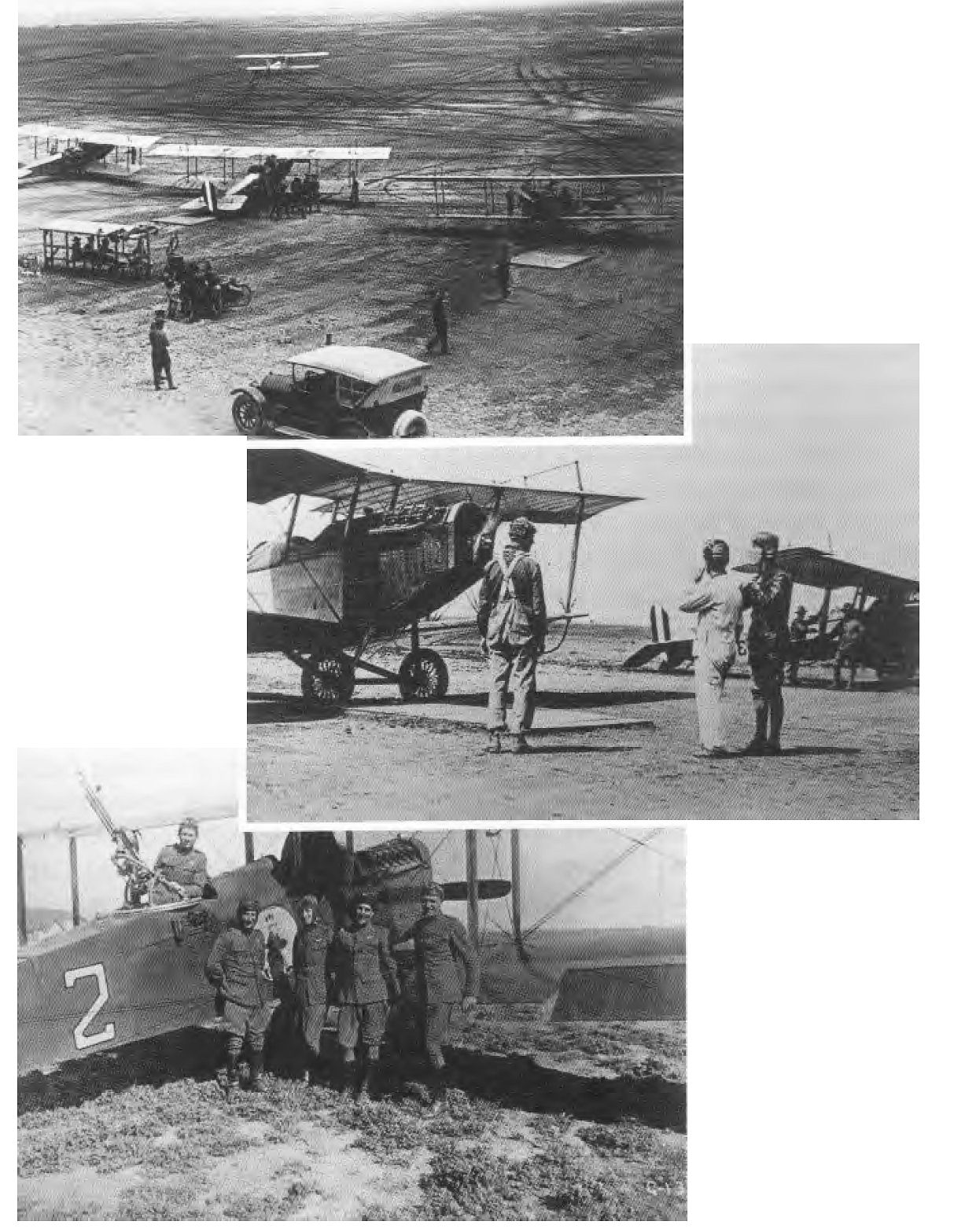
Post World War I flight training at Kelly Field Texas.

Primary flight training was held only at March Field in California and Carlstrom Field in Florida. The pilot school course combined ground school and elementary flight training. Cadets flew training flights in wartime surplus Curtiss JN-4D Jennies and also deHavilland DH-4s. The first class of cadets at both March and Carlstrom were enlisted men from various Air Service units. Civilians constituted most of the second class. Advanced training was held at Post Field, Fort Sill, Oklahoma for observers and pilots. Pursuit and bombardment training took place at Kelly Field.

On 4 June 1920, the National Defense Act of 1920 took effect and the United States Army Air Service was statutorily recognized as the combatant air arm of the United States Army. At the time, the Air Service had 1,155 Regular officers; by year’s end, there were 975. Of that number, only 642 were pilots.

The Training and Operations Group of the Air Service had hoped to graduate thirty men per month, but in the last six months of 1920, Carlstrom had graduated thirty-six officers and fifty-six cadets; March had graduated twenty-five officers and sixty-seven cadets. A number of the students in the early class, especially at Carlstrom Field, were naval officers not destined for Army squadrons. However, neither of the primary pilot schools had executive officers and that Carlstrom did not even have an Officer in Charge of Flying. The schools keenly felt the critical shortage of manpower. They did not have enough enlisted mechanics to keep the airplanes fully operational. Too few instructors remained in the service to teach students, assuming that students could be recruited in reasonable numbers.

For a time after the war, the commissioned grades of the Air Service held no vacancies. Furthermore, Congress forbade new Army enlistments in early 1921, which effectively curtailed the training new cadets.

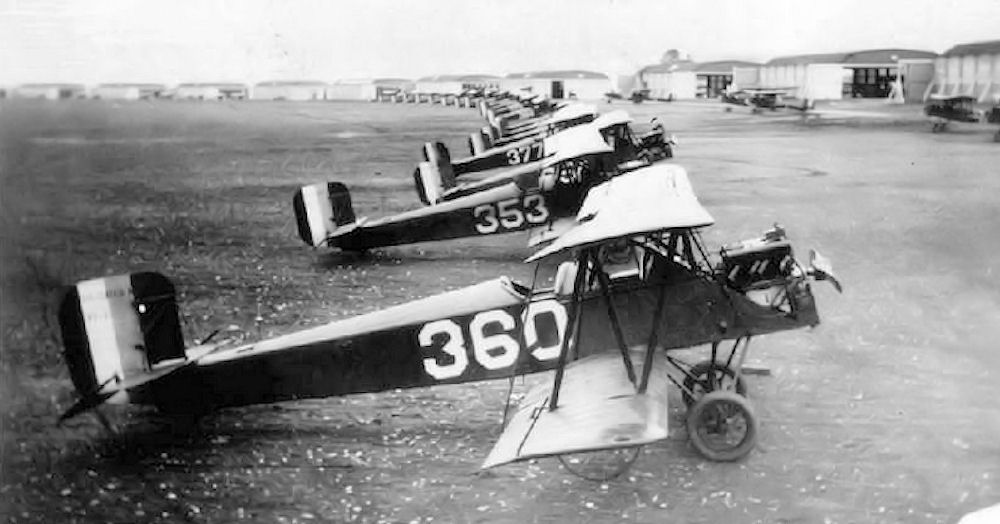
11th School Group Consolidated PT-1 trainers, Brooks Field, Texas, March 1926.

It was decided to close March and Carlstrom and consolidate all flight training at Brooks and Kelly Fields. By 1 September 1922, the Air Service Primary Flying School 11th School Group was operational at Brooks; the Advanced Flying School 10th School Group was operational at Kelly Field. Students graduating the primary flying school at Brooks Field went on to the Advanced Flying School at Kelly Field.

To be eligible to enter flight training, a candidate had to be an unmarried male citizen of the United States between the ages of twenty and twenty-seven and have a high school diploma or its equivalent. Applicants took a physical and educational examination, and those accepted were assigned to a primary flight school class at Brooks Field. Until 1926, most students learned to fly on the JN-6H. The Advanced Flying School divided its system of instruction into basic and advanced phases. Basic training continued the staged instruction of primary training in which all students worked through increasingly difficult maneuvers. Advanced students spent approximately twelve weeks performing, figure-eights, 180- and 360-degree turns, performance flights, formations, and cross-country and night flying. The students were then moved into specialized flying of observation, bombing, pursuit, or attack aircraft.

=== Air Corps Training Center ===
March 1927 Kelly and Brooks Field Texas Pilot Graduation Classbook

Flying Division, Air Training Command's origins begin in 1922 when the Army Air Service consolidated its center for primary training at Brooks Field, Texas, and its advanced center at Kelly Field, Texas. In the era after World War I, each phase of instruction lasted about six months, with the school at Kelly being divided into three months of basic and advanced instruction. With the decision by the Coolidge Administration to expand the Air Service, the Army established the Air Corps Training Center in San Antonio, with the two fight schools, and adding the School of Aviation Medicine at Brooks Field.

As the new center began to carry out its mission of improving the supervision of flying training, it discovered that the facilities in the San Antonio area were insufficient to accommodate the expanded number of cadets entering primary training. Hence, primary pilot training resumed at March Field, California, from 1927 to 1931.

The decision in 1927 to continue the system of a hierarchy of training schools led to the search for another primary flying field close to the hub of activity and the good weather in Texas. The investigation resulted in the selection of an area seventeen miles northeast of San Antonio. Opened on 1 January 1931, Randolph Field was trumpeted as the "West Point of the Air".

With the opening of Randolph Field primary flight training was transferred from March to the new facility there. The Air Corps Training Center at Randolph Field was in charge of the entire Army pilot training program in the United States from 1931 to 1939. The Center developed an efficient, well-coordinated flying training program that focused on the quality of its pilots. It was not only critical to the development of military flight training, but also to the training of American pilots, who after graduation spread out over the world, some to commercial airline jobs in Latin America and the Philippines, others to the government or industry occupations that took them to Europe and Asia. However, the program only produced about 200 pilots a year.

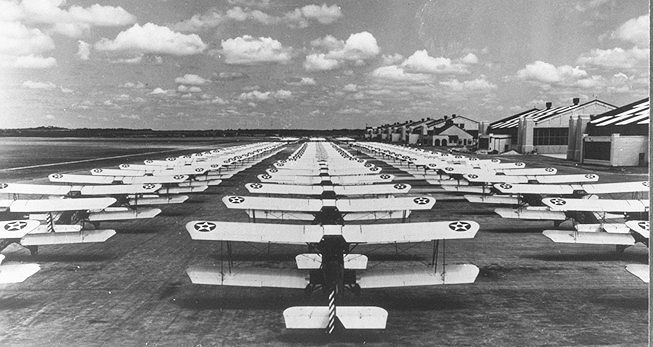
A field of Consolidated PT-3s stands ready for trainees

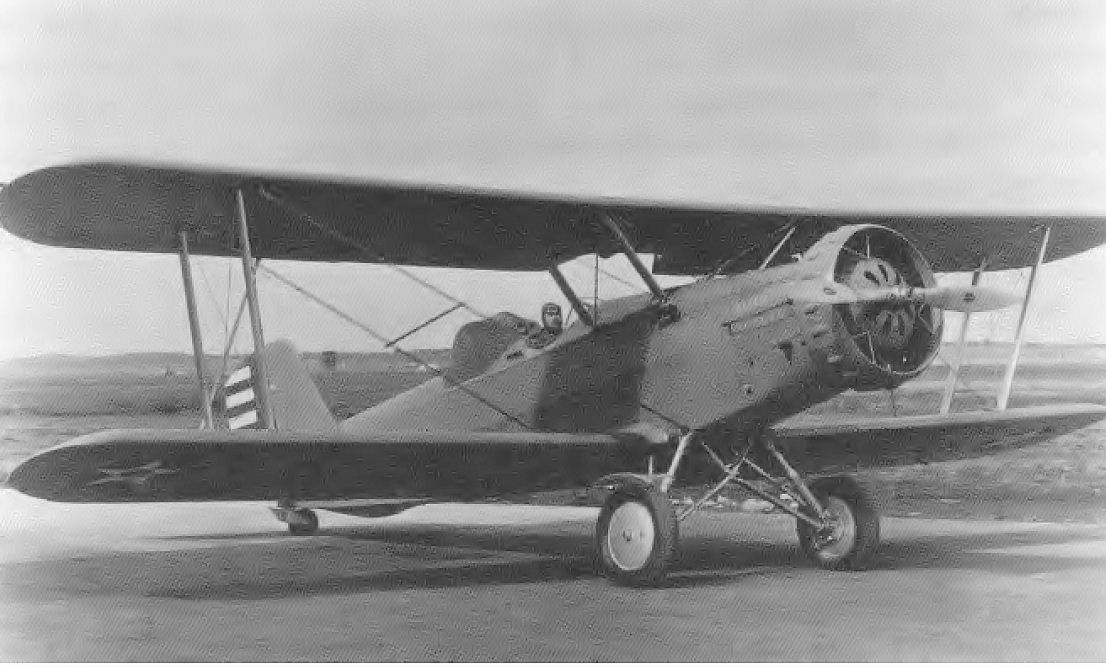
An early model Douglas BT-2 (O-37) equipped with a flying blind hood.

The size of its aircraft inventory and the number of airmen who trained at Randolph Field failed to equal the compound’s magnificence. By 1934 the school could graduate 150 cadets a year, although it had increased the number of flying hours by thirty-five and expanded the syllabus. Between the time in October 1931, when the first school troops reported to Randolph from the old primary schools at Brooks and March Fields, and 1 March 1935, when GHQ Air Force took form, slightly more than 2,000 would-be pilots reported to the Primary Flying School. Cadets constituted approximately 75 percent of the students reporting, and nearly 47 percent graduated.

The creation of the GHQ Air Force made 1935 a banner year, as the air arm moved a step closer to that longed-for reality. GHQAF gave the Chief of the Air Corps responsibility for overseeing individual training at the flying schools. The Training Section reviewed the programs of instruction at the Primary and Advanced Flying Schools, the Air Corps Tactical School, and the Air Corps Technical School; reviewed training programs submitted by the War Department; supervised preparation and revision of pertinent training materials including manuals, regulations, circulars, and films; maintained various types of training records and statistics; and reviewed and recommended matters concerning the training of the National Guard and Air Reserve.

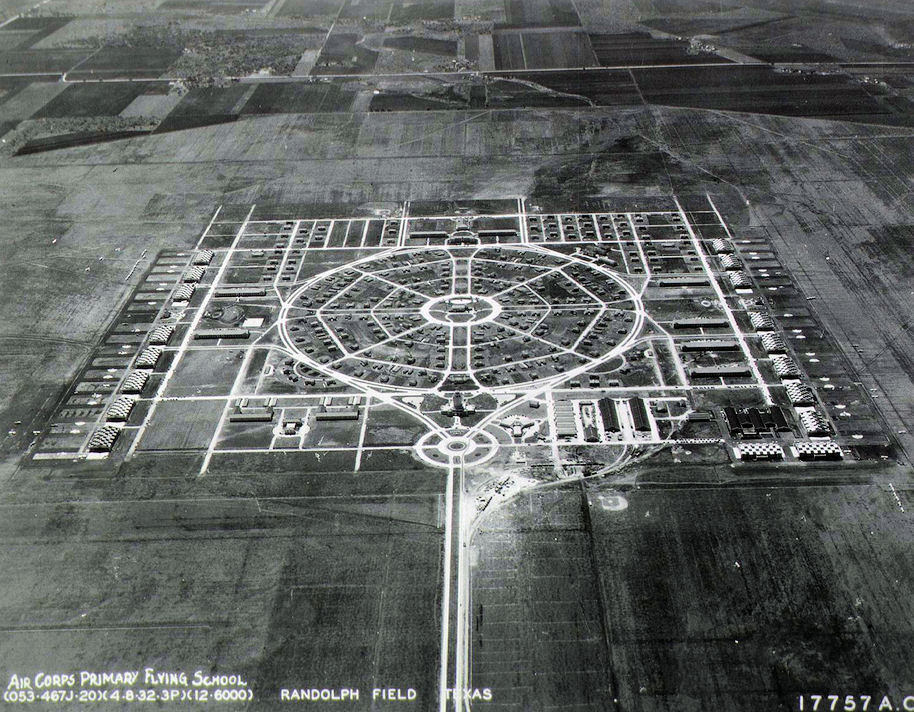
Randolph Field, Texas, 1931

In late 1937 Chief of the Air Corps Maj. Gen. Oscar Westover submitted to the General Staff a statement of Air Corps objectives that ratified pilot specialization and pinpointed desired stops in the now-established professional educational system along an upward path toward promotion and leadership. Following graduation from the Training Center, all officers would join a tactical unit for at least two years. Thereafter individuals might compete for additional education and training.

In 1939 only two Air Corps flying schools were operating, Randolph Field and, for advanced training, Kelly Field with Brooks as a subpost. Beginning in 1939, the Air Corps contracted primary flight training to civilian schools, and Randolph Field's mission shifted to basic pilot training. It was General Arnold's belief that by turning over the responsibility for primary training to other agencies, he could free the Air Corps to concentrate its full resources on later phases of training, and thus in effect expand the capacity.

=== World War II ===
On 24 May 1940, General Henry H. Arnold submitted a plan to the War Department for 3 training centers. When the new centers for the West Coast (HQ at Moffett Field CA) and Southeast (Maxwell Field AL) were established on 22 August 1940; the existing "Air Corps Training Center" was redesignated the Gulf Coast Air Corps Training Center. Funding of a 30,000-pilot training program was approved on 5 April 1941, and included new GCACTC bases at "Enid, Okla.; Perrin Field, Sherman, Tex.; Waco, Tex.; Moore Field, Mission, Tex.; Lubbock, Tex.; Midland, Tex.; and Lake Charles, La." In 1941, "thirty-two major flying fields comprise[d] the Gulf Coast Air Corps Training Center" for basic and advanced flying training plus 16 civilian flight schools by October (a bombing range was also part of the center).

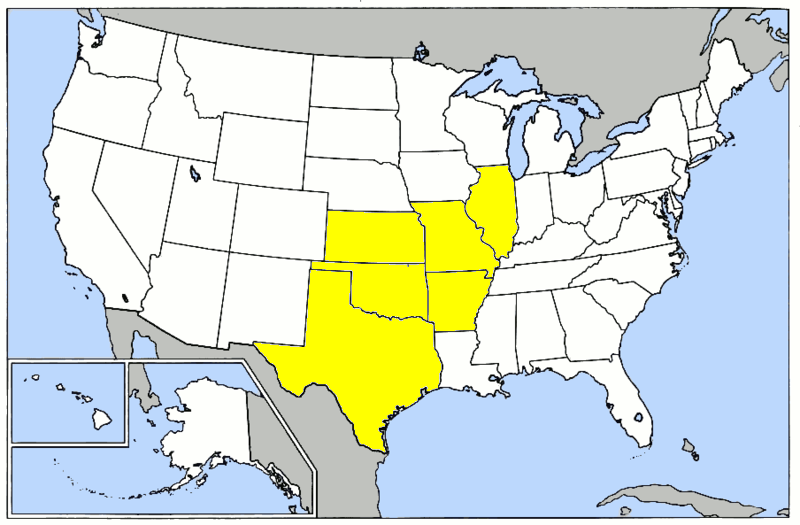
World War II locations of airfields controlled by the Central Flying Training Command, AAFTC NOTE: Marfa Army Airfield, Pecos Army Airfield, & Wink Field in West Texas were part of the West Coast ACTC.

The Central Instructors School began at Randolph in January 1942, and the first "flying sergeants" graduated as combat pilots in May 1942 "at a civil contract flying school in the Gulf Coast Air Corps Training Center"

On 26 September 1942, the GCACTC's Advanced Twin Engine and Bombardier Training Center at Midland, Texas, was redesignated Midland Army Airfield's Army Air Forces Bombardier School (colloq. Bombardier College) which operated 23 bombing ranges in West Texas (the school had moved to Albuquerque Army Air Base by 28 February 1945).

In conjunction with the USAAF Flying Training Command merging with the Technical Training Command; on 31 July 1943, the Gulf Coast Air Corps Training Center was redesignated as the Central Flying Training Command when the GCACTC schools were consolidated with the separate navigator training (4 schools including 1 at Ellington Field that had been a bombardier school) and The consolidation supported January 1943 Casablanca Conference decision regarding airpower in the European Theatre and the resulting "Combined Bomber Offensive from the United Kingdom" plan, which required aircrews for 4 development phases (944, 1192, 1746, & 2702 bombers) through 31 March 1944.

By 1944, Central Flying Training Command (CFTC) controlled a large number of training schools in the Southwestern United States and established several Wings to provide organizational command and control over them, based on both training types and geography. The schools operated by CFTC part of the Aviation Cadet Training Program. These were:

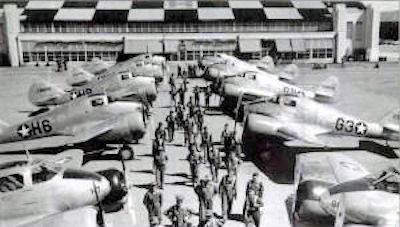
Instructors and air cadets at Randolph Field, Texas with Curtiss-Wright AT-9 advanced two-engine trainers, 1944

- Classification: This was the stage where it would be decided whether the cadet would train as a navigator, bombardier, or pilot
- Preflight: Ground training for all air cadets. Successful completion meant being assigned to a flying school for training. "Washouts" were returned to the regular Air Corps ranks for reassignment.
- Primary (Phase I): Taught basic flying using two-seater training aircraft. Usually taught by contract flying schools operated by the WFTC
- Basic (Phase II): Formation flying, air navigation, cross-country flying skills were taught.
- Advanced (Phase II): Single or multi-engine aircraft schools for cadets becoming fighter, bomber or transport pilots. After graduation, the successful Air Cadet received his "wings" and were commissioned Second Lieutenants. In addition, experienced pilots in the field were sent to Training Command "transition schools" to acquire additional single or multi-engine flying ratings.

In addition to the American Air Cadets, Cadets from the British Royal Air Force and Free French Air Force were trained in flying skills. CFTC also operated aircrew schools for Navigators, Bombardiers and flexible aerial gunners. Radio operators were centrally trained at Scott Field, Illinois. Other aircrew positions, such as B-29 flight engineers and RADAR operators were also trained later in the war as training requirements presented themselves. This included the first jet pilots in 1945.

=== Postwar era ===
Shortly after the end of World War II on 15 December 1945, Central Flying Training Command consolidated with Western Flying Training Command on 1 November 1945 and was re-designated Western Flying Training Command. This reflected the massive demobilization after the end of the war and the closure of the majority of the wartime training bases.

On 15 December 1945 Western Flying Training Command consolidated with the Eastern Flying Training Command. The single entity became Army Air Forces Flying Training Command on 1 January 1946, with its headquarters at Randolph Field, Texas. On 1 November 1946, the Flying Training Command was re-designated as the Flying Training Division of the new Air Training Command, established as part of the postwar reorganization of the Army Air Forces.

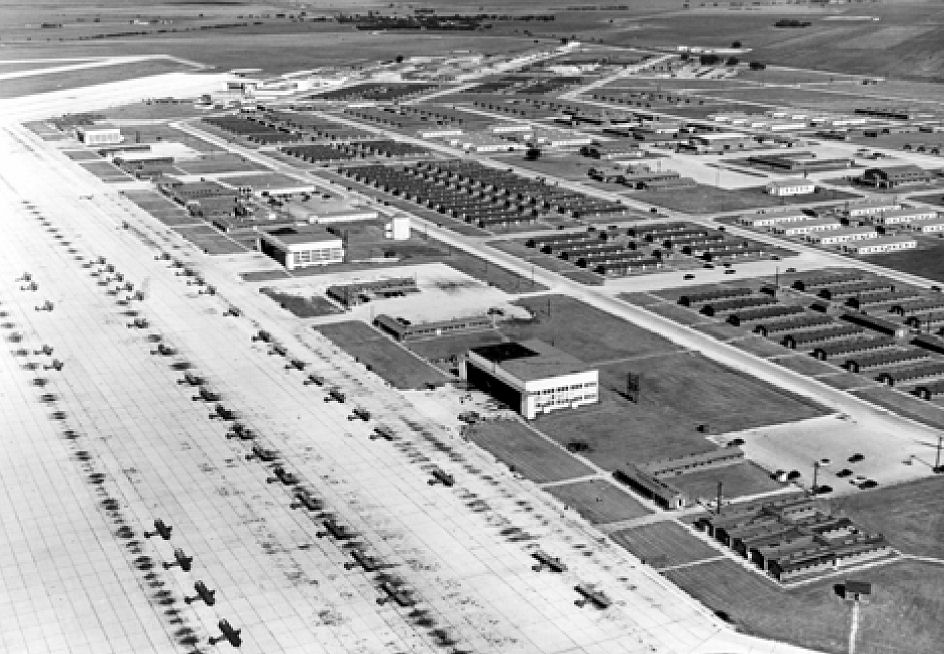
May 1946 photo of the parking ramp of San Marcos Field, Texas which operated the Flying Division helicopter and liaison schools

By 1946, all the wartime Flying Training Wings were disbanded, and command and control were consolidated into the Flying Training Division. The flight schools at the bases which remained open were consolidated into the Army Air Forces (later Air Force) base units. After the establishment of the United States Air Force in September 1947 and the implementation of the Hobson Wing-Base plan in 1948, the Base Units were discontinued, and ATC established new Pilot Training Wings at each base. This new plan made the training organizations uniform with the other major commands throughout the Air Force.

In addition, the pilot training program was consolidated into two classes, Basic and Advanced. Also, the wide variety of training aircraft was reduced to streamline the training program. Jet training aircraft and courses were also added, along with helicopter training as the new wartime technologies were added into the postwar Air Force inventory as fully operational weapons systems.

Austere postwar military budgets led to additional consolidations and all of the flying programs suffered from shortages of aircraft replacement parts, qualified maintenance personnel, and instructors—problems that existed been with the schools throughout the postwar era. The last half of 1949 was an exercise in austerity. President Harry S. Truman decided that the country could only afford a 48-group Air Force. With only a minimum of operating funds available, the Secretary of Defense directed major spending cuts throughout the Department of Defense (DOD). In a re-organization, Flying Division, Air Training Command was inactivated on 14 November 1949 when Air Training Command absorbed its subordinate Divisions into its command organization to comply with the budget reduction directive.

== Lineage ==
- Constituted as the Air Corps Training Center
- Activated on 1 September 1926
- Redesignated Gulf Coast Air Corps Training Center on 8 July 1940
- Redesignated Army Air Forces Gulf Coast Training Center on 29 October 1942
- Redesignated Central Flying Training Command on 31 July 1943
- Redesignated Western Flying Training Command on 15 December 1945
- Redesignated Army Air Forces Flying Training Command on 1 January 1946
- Redesignated Flying Division, Air Training Command on 1 July 1946
- Inactivated on 14 November 1949

=== Assignments ===
- Office of the Chief of Air Corps, 1 September 1926
- Air Corps Flying Training Command (later Army Air Forces Flying Training Command, Army Air Forces Training Command, Air Training Command), 23 January 1942 – 14 November 1949

=== Stations ===
- San Antonio, Texas, 1 September 1926
- Randolph Field (later Randolph Air Force Base), Texas, 1 January 1931 – 14 November 1949

=== Major Components ===
==== Inter-war years ====
Brooks Field, San Antonio, Texas
Air Service (later Corps) Primary Flying School
11th School Group, 1 September 1922 – 1 October 1931
School of Aerospace Medicine, 30 June 1926 – 30 October 1931

March Field, Riverside, California
Air Corps Primary Flying School
13th School Group, 31 July 1927 – 30 April 1931

Kelly Field, San Antonio, Texas
Air Service (later Corps) Advanced Flying School, 22 June 1922-
10th School Group, 22 June 1922 – 15 July 1931
24th School Wing 1 August 1927 – 1 October 1931

Randolph Field, San Antonio, Texas
Air Corps Primary Flying School*, 31 December 1931-
School of Aerospace Medicine, 30 October 1931 – 15 September 1944

*All primary flying school units consolidated at Randolph Field, 31 December 1931

==== World War II ====
- 31st Flying Training Wing (Primary)

Headquarters:

Enid Army Airfield, Oklahoma, 16 Jan 1943
Fort Worth Army Airfield, Texas, 31 May-30 December 1945

- 32d Flying Training Wing (Basic)

Headquarters:

Perrin Field, Texas, 16 January 1943
Randolph Field, Texas, 31 October 1945 – 13 October 1946

- 33d Flying Training Wing (Advanced, Two Engine)

Headquarters:

Blackland Army Airfield, Texas, 16 January 1943
Waco Army Airfield, Texas, 8 Jul 1944
Randolph Field, Texas, 31 October 1945 – 13 October 1946

- 34th Flying Training Wing (Bombardier and Specialized Two/Four-Engine)

Headquarters:

San Angelo Army Airfield, Texas, 8 January 1943
Midland Army Airfield, Texas, 25 May 1945 – 16 June 1946

- 77th Flying Training Wing (Advanced, Single Engine)

Headquarters:

Foster Army Airfield, Texas, 25 August 1943
Bryan Army Air Base, Texas, 26 March 1945 – 16 June 1946

- 78th Flying Training Wing (Classification/Preflight)

Headquarters:

San Antonio Aviation Cadet Center, Texas, 25 August 1943 – 30 June 1945

- 79th Flying Training Wing (Gunnery)

Headquarters:

Harlingen Army Airfield, Texas, 25 August 1943
Maxwell Field, Alabama, 15 October-30 December 1945.

- 80th Flying Training Wing (Navigation and Glider)

Headquarters:

San Marcos Army Airfield, Texas, 25 August 1943
Ellington Field, Texas, 1 January 1945 – 16 June 1946

==== Postwar ====
- Randolph Field (later Air Force Base), Texas

2532d Army Air Forces (later Air Force) Base Unit
3510th Pilot Training Wing (Basic)

- Barksdale Field (later Air Force Base), Louisiana

331st Army Air Forces (later Air Force) Base Unit
3500th Pilot Training Wing (Advanced, Multi-Engine)

- Goodfellow Field (later Air Force Base), Texas

2533d Army Air Forces Base Unit
3545th Pilot Training Wing (Basic)

- Mather Field (later Air Force Base), California

1505th Army Air Forces (later Air Force) Base Unit
3535th Bombardier Training Wing

- Las Vegas Field (later Air Force Base), Nevada

3006th Army Air Forces Base Unit
3595th Pilot Training Wing (Advanced, Single-Engine)

- San Marcos Field, Texas (later Air Force Base

2456th Army Air Forces (later Air Force) Base Unit
3585th Pilot Training Wing (Liaison-Helicopter)

- Perrin Field (later Air Force Base), Texas

2621st Army Air Forces Base Unit
3585th Pilot Training Wing (Basic)

- Waco Field (later Air Force Base), Texas

2543d Army Air Forces Base Unit
3565th Pilot Training Wing (Basic)

- Enid Field (later Air Force Base), Oklahoma

2518th Army Air Forces Base Unit
3575th Pilot Training Wing (Advanced, Multi-Engine)

- Williams Field (later Air Force Base), Arizona

3010th Army Air Forces (later Air Force) Base Unit
3525th Pilot Training Wing (Advanced, Single-Engine)

=== Major Aircraft ===
==== Inter-war years ====
Primary trainers

Consolidated PT-1, 1921–1928
Consolidated PT-3 (PT-11, PT-12), 1927–1937
Boeing-Stearman PT-13, 1937-

Basic trainers

Curtiss-Wright (de Havilland) DH-4 1921–1932
Douglas O-2K (Converted to BT-1), 1930–
Douglas O-32A (Converted to BT-2), 1930-

Advanced trainers

Curtiss P-1 Hawk (Converted to AT-4, AT-5), 1926–

==== World War II ====
Primary flight training

Boeing-Stearman PT-17, Fairchild PT-19 and Ryan PT-22 twin-seat, single engine trainers

Basic flight training

Vultee BT-13 and Vultee BT-15

Advanced flight training

North American AT-6 (single engine); Cessna AT-17 (two-engine)

Specialized schools:

Curtiss-Wright AT-9s were used for high performance two-engine training in preparation for Lockheed P-38 Lightning training
Beechcraft AT-10s were used for pilots in training for two engine bombers (B-25s and B-26s)
Beechcraft AT-11s were used for pilots in training for C-47 transports along with bombardier training
Beechcraft AT-7s were used for two-engine pilot training and also navigator training
Boeing B-17s and Consolidated B-24s were used for four-engine pilot training
L-2, L-3, L-4, TG-5 and TG-6s were used for glider and liaison pilot training
Gunnery training schools flew A-33, AT-6s, AT-1s, B-34s, B-10s and RP-63s for air-to-air flexible gunnery training.

==== Postwar ====
- Basic flight training

North American T-6G Texan

- Advanced, Single-Engine

North American F-51D Mustang

- Advanced, Multi-Engine

Douglas A-26 Invader
North American B-25 Mitchell

- Advanced, Jet (Williams, Las Vegas)

Lockheed T-33 Shooting Star

- Liaison-Helicopter

Piper L-4 Grasshopper
Aeronca L-16A Grasshopper
Sikorsky R-5
Sikorsky R-6

- Navigation

Convair T-29

== List of notable commanders ==
- Gerald C. Brant, 4 October 1940–22 October 1941
- Frank P. Lahm, 23 October 1941 – 30 November 1941
- Hubert R. Harmon, 1 December 1941–September, 1942
