= 42nd Attack Squadron =

42d Attack Squadron

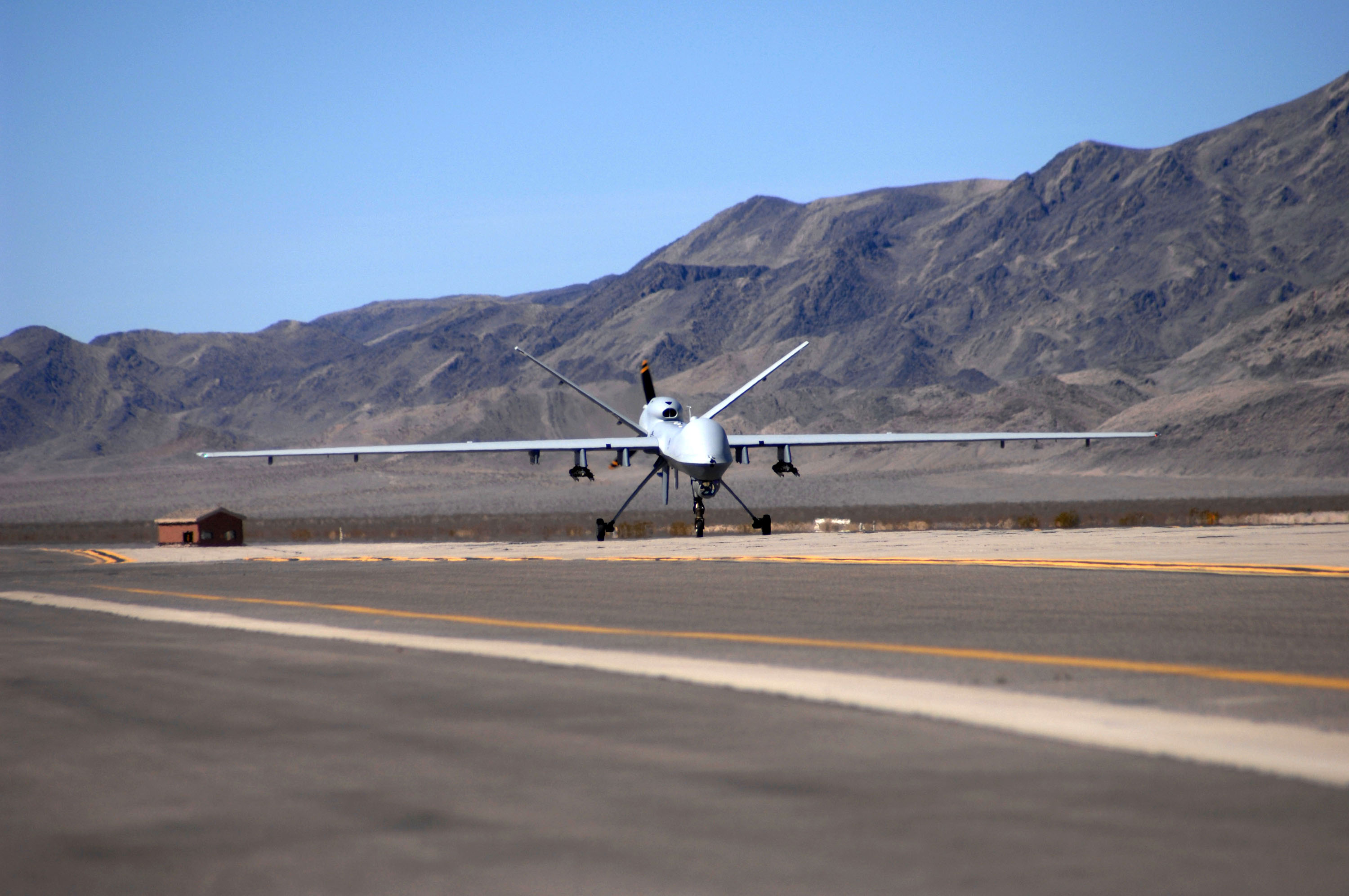
- First squadron MQ-9 Reaper at Creech AFB
- Active: 1917–1919; 1922–1936; 1940–1963; 2006–2020; 2026-present
- Country: United States
- Branch: United States Air Force
- Type: Squadron
- Role: Unmanned Aerial vehicle
- Part of: Air Combat Command
- Garrison/HQ: Creech Air Force Base, Nevada
- Decorations: Distinguished Unit Citation; Navy Presidential Unit Citation; Air Force Meritorious Unit Award; Air Force Outstanding Unit Award

Commanders
- Notable commanders: Lt Gen Roger M. Ramey; Maj Gen Orvil A. Anderson

Insignia
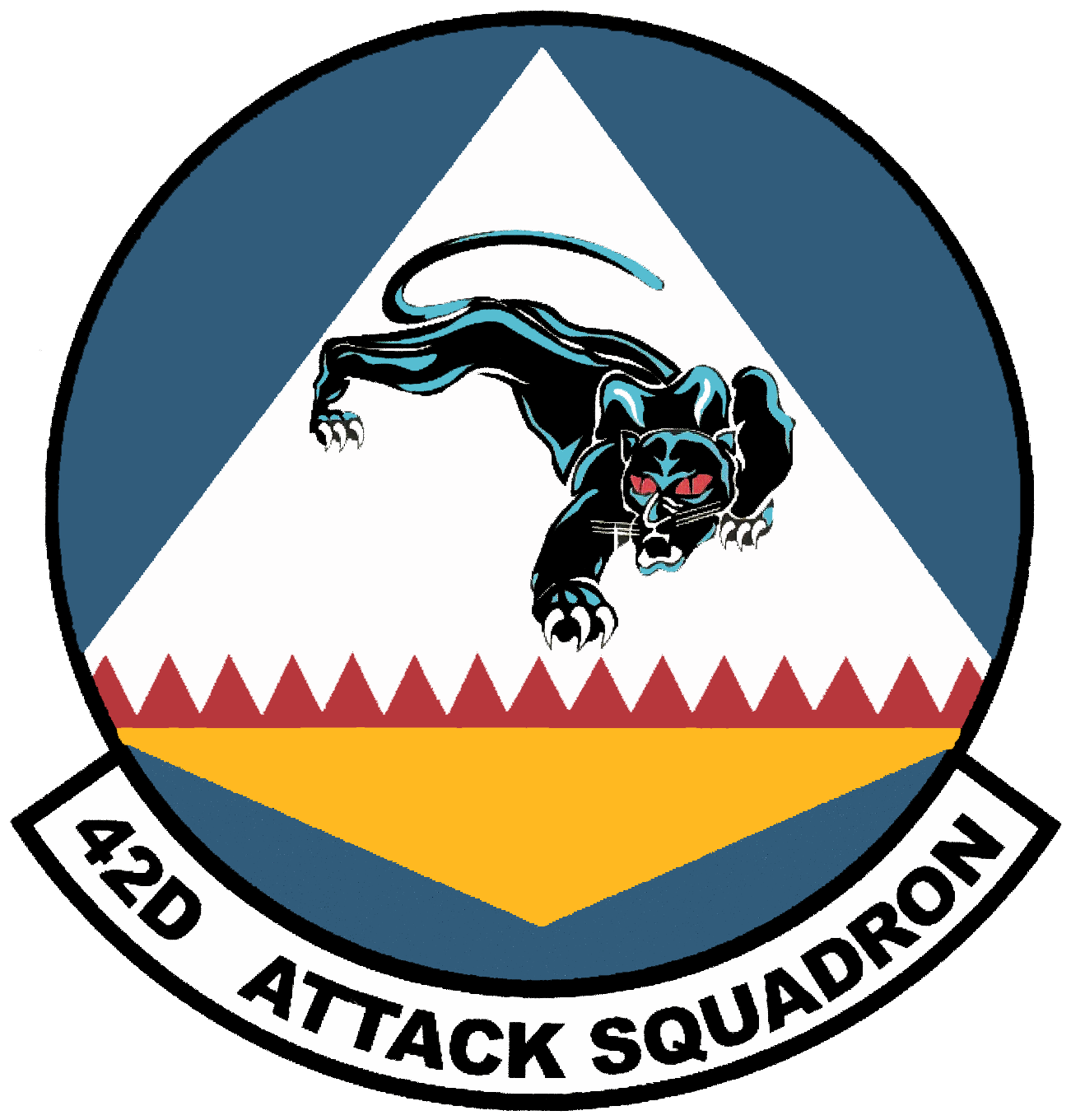
- 42nd Attack Squadron emblem (Note: Approved 30 November 2009.)

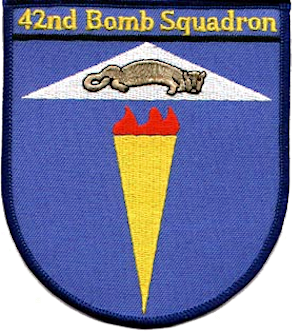
- 42nd School Squadron emblem (Note: Approved 20 January 1925. Description: A blue shield charged with a gold torch paleways, in the chief a white triangle displaying a puma observing its prey, dark brown shading into gray on under side with stripes of very dark brown, crouching on a brown branch of a tree.)

The 42d Attack Squadron is a United States Air Force unit assigned to the 25th Attack Group located at Creech Air Force Base near Indian Springs, Nevada. It flew the General Atomics MQ-9 Reaper unmanned aerial vehicle. The 42d oversaw the training and combat deployment of aerial vehicle and sensor operators assigned to the Reaper.

Created as the first operational MQ-9 Reaper squadron in 2006, the squadron flew its final sortie on 31 January 2020, following which its personnel and equipment were withdrawn, although it remained active as a "dormant" unit.

== History ==
=== World War I ===
The first predecessor of the squadron was organized as the 42d Aero Squadron on 17 June 1917, shortly after the United States declared war on Germany. Based at Camp Kelly, Texas, the squadron trained new pilots as part of the United States Army Air Service until it was demobilized on 21 February 1919. They also had a football team that once played against the Dayton Triangles.

=== Interwar years ===
The second predecessor of the squadron was organized in 1922 as the 42d Squadron (School) and became the 42d School Squadron in January 1923 as part of the 10th School Group at Kelly Field. In April 1924 it was consolidated with the 42d Aero Squadron. The 42d squadron continued its flying training role as part of the United States Army Air Corps in 1926, and was assigned to the Advanced Flying School at Kelly Field in 1931.

On 1 March 1935, with the activation of the General Headquarters Air Force, the squadron was redesignated the 42d Bombardment Squadron, although it remained a training squadron at Kelly until its inactivation in September 1936.

It was organized once again only a month later, as a Regular Army inactive unit assigned to the Eighth Corps Area, on 23 October 1936. (Note: Regular Army Inactive units were units that were constituted in the regular army. Although they were not activated, they were organized with reserve personnel during the 1920s and 1930s. Even though they had reserve personnel assigned, they were not Organized Reserve units. Because they had no regular personnel they were still considered inactive in the regular army. Clay, p. vi.) Until September 1939, the squadron existed only as an inactive cadre of Organized Reserve officers, at Brownsville Municipal Airport, Texas.

On 1 February 1940, squadron was activated as one of the original four squadrons of the 11th Bombardment Group at Hickam Field, Hawaii. Beginning in May 1941, the squadron began training with the Boeing B-17D Flying Fortress, with the capability to fly longer missions from its base at Hickam.

=== World War II ===
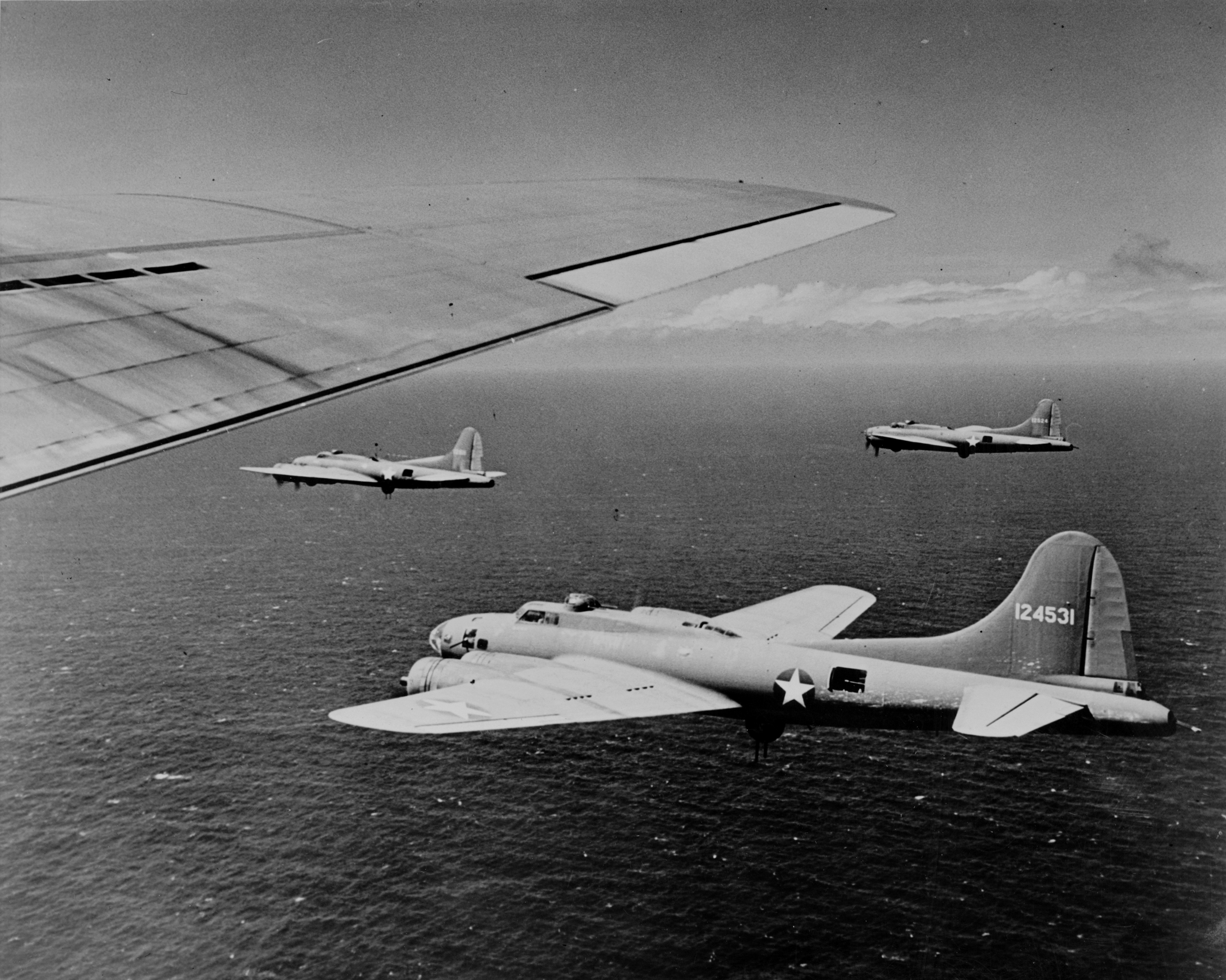
11th Group B-17F Flying Fortress bombers over the Southwest Pacific in 1942 (Note: The Boeing B-17F-20-BO Flying Fortress, serial 41-24531 visible on the right was shot down by a Japanese Mitsubishi A6M Zero fighter over Tonolei harbour, Buna Island, Solomon Islands on 18 November 1942. During the attack the pilot Maj. Allen J. Seward, and the copilot Lt. Jack Lee were killed. One engine caught on fire, but Col. LaVerne Saunders made a water landing about 50 km from Tonolei harbour near a very small island. An Australian coastwatcher reached the survivors about three hours later. The crew was taken to Vella Lavella Island an picked up by a Navy Consolidated PBY-5 Catalina and returned to Guadalcanal.)

The squadron was at Hickam during the Japanese attack on Pearl Harbor on 7 December 1941. The squadron flew patrol and search missions from the Hawaiian Islands, including air support during the Battle of Midway. In June 1942, shortly after the Battle of Midway, the 11th Group was authorized as a mobile force by the Army Air Forces in order to respond to a Navy request by Admiral Nimitz for long-range armed search planes to locate Japanese fleets, accompanied with firepower to withstand defending Japanese interceptors while tracking the fleet. The 11th Group left Hawaii to support Navy operations in the South Pacific Theater during the Guadalcanal and Northern Solomon Islands Campaigns.

The squadron moved to the New Caledonia on 22 July 1942 and became part of Thirteenth Air Force. It bombed airfields, supply dumps, ships, docks, troop positions, and other objectives in the South Pacific from July to November 1942, and received a Distinguished Unit Citation for those operations. It continued operations in the South Pacific, attacking Japanese airfields, installations, and shipping until late March 1943.

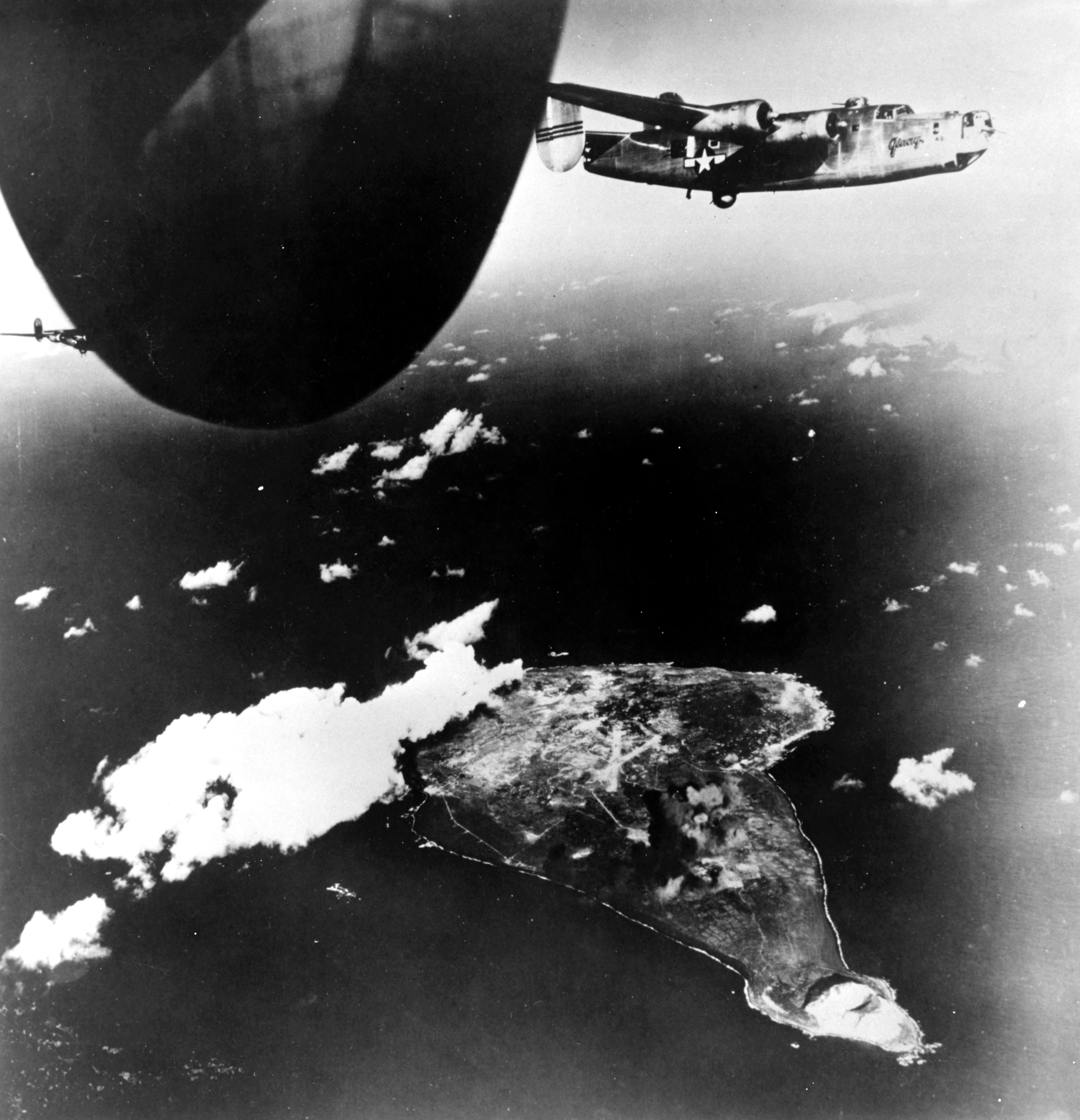
11th Group B-24 Liberators after attacking Iwo Jima on 15 December 1944

The squadron returned to Hawaii and the control of Seventh Air Force on 8 April 1943. In Hawaii, the squadron equipped with Consolidated B-24 Liberator bombers, which it flew until the end of the war. Its training Included missions against Wake Island and other central Pacific bases held by the Japanese. It deployed to the Gilbert Islands on 9 November 1943 and resumed combat participating in the Allied offensive through the Gilbert, Marshall and Marianas Islands, while operating from Funafuti, Tarawa, and Kwajalein.

"The [squadron] moved to Guam on 25 October 1944 and attacked shipping and airfields in the Volcano and Bonin Islands. It moved to Okinawa on 2 July 1945 to participate in the final phases of the air offensive against Japan, bombing railways, airfields, and harbor facilities on Kyushu and striking Japanese airfields in Eastern China."

=== Postwar operations in the Pacific ===
After V-J Day, the squadron flew surveillance and reconnaissance missions over China and ferried former prisoners of war to the Philippines. In December 1945 the squadron moved without personnel or equipment to Fort William McKinley, Philippines. At the end of April 1946, it was designated as a very heavy bomber unit. The following month, it moved to Northwest Field, Guam and began to re-equip with Boeing B-29 Superfortresses, but terminated all operations and training by October. The squadron remained on Guam on paper until inactivating on 20 October 1948.

=== Strategic Air Command ===
The squadron was reactivated as a unit of the United States Air Force on 1 December 1948. Assigned to the 11th Bombardment Group as part of the Strategic Air Command, it flew Convair B-36 Peacemaker intercontinental bombers from Carswell Air Force Base, Texas. In 1957 it moved to Altus Air Force Base, Oklahoma, to convert to Boeing B-52 Stratofortresses.

In 1960 was reassigned to the 4043rd Strategic Wing, being re-equipped with B-52E intercontinental heavy bombers. The squadron moved to Wright-Patterson Air Force Base, Ohio by SAC to disperse its heavy bomber force. Conducted worldwide strategic bombardment training missions and providing nuclear deterrent. Was inactivated in 1963 when SAC inactivated its strategic wings, replacing them with permanent Air Force Wings. Squadron was inactivated with its aircraft, personnel and equipment transferred to the 34th Bombardment Squadron.

In 1989-90 it was part of the 11th Strategic Wing at RAF Fairford in the UK, as the 42nd Strategic Squadron.

=== Unmanned aerial vehicles ===
On 9 November 2006, the squadron was redesignated the 42d Attack Squadron and reactivated at Creech Air Force Base, Nevada, initially as part of the 57th Wing before being assigned as one of the six unmanned aerial vehicle squadrons of the 432nd Wing, and the only squadron designated as an attack squadron.

The 42nd received its first General Atomics MQ-9 Reaper on 13 March 2007. Officially combat-operational in Afghanistan since September 2007, the typical MQ-9 system consists of several aircraft, a ground control station, communications equipment/links, spares, and active duty and/or contractor personnel. The crew consists of one unmanned aerial system pilot, one sensor operator and one mission intelligence coordinator.

The squadron flew its last combat sortie on 31 January 2020, following which all personnel and equipment were withdrawn from the unit, although it remained active as a "paper unit." The 42 ATKS was reactivated at Creech AFB, Nevada in March 2026 as part of a reorganization of the MQ-9 fleet.

== Lineage ==
42d Aero Squadron

- Organized as the 42d Aero Squadron on 13 June 1917
- Demobilized on 21 February 1919
- Reconstituted on 8 April 1924 and consolidated with the 42d School Squadron as the 42d School Squadron

42d Attack Squadron

- Authorized 10 June 1922 as the 42d Squadron (School)

Organized on 5 July 1922
Redesignated 42d School Squadron on 25 January 1923
Consolidated with the 42d Aero Squadron on 8 April 1924
Redesignated 42d Bombardment Squadron on 1 March 1935
Inactivated on 1 September 1936

- Organized as a Regular Army Inactive unit on 23 November 1936
- Redesignated 42d Bombardment Squadron (Medium) on 22 December 1939

Activated on 1 February 1940
Redesignated 42d Bombardment Squadron (Heavy) on 11 December 1940
Redesignated 42d Bombardment Squadron, Heavy c. 1 August 1944
Redesignated 42d Bombardment Squadron, Very Heavy on 30 April 1946
Inactivated on 20 October 1948

- Redesignated 42nd Bomb Squadron, Heavy and activated on 1 December 1948

Discontinued and inactivated on 1 February 1963

- Redesignated 42d Attack Squadron on 24 October 2006
- Activated on 9 November 2006

=== Assignments ===
- Unknown, 13 June 1917 – 21 February 1919 (Note: Probably Post Headquarters, Kelly Field and Wilbur Wright Field.)
- 10th School Group, 5 July 1922
- Air Corps Advanced Flying School, 16 July 1931
- 3d Wing, GHQ Air Force, 1 March 1935 – 1 September 1936 (attached to Air Corps Advanced Flying School)
- Eighth Corps Area as a Regular Army Inactive unit on 23 November 1936
- 11th Bombardment Group, 1 February 1940 – 20 October 1948
- 11th Bombardment Group, 1 December 1948 (attached to 11th Bombardment Wing after 16 February 1951)
- 11th Bombardment Wing, 16 June 1952
- 4043rd Strategic Wing, 1 June 1960
- 57th Operations Group, 9 November 2006
- 432nd Operations Group, 1 May 2007
- 25th Attack Group, 12 July 2019 – 2020; 2026-present

=== Stations ===
- Camp Kelly, Texas, 13 June 1917
- Wilbur Wright Field, Ohio, 25 August 1917 – 21 February 1919
- Kelly Field, Texas, 5 July 1922 – 1 September 1936
- Brownsville Municipal Airport, Texas as a Regular Army Inactive unit on 23 November 1936
- Hickam Field, Hawaii, 1 February 1940
- Kualoa Airfield, Hawaii, 5 June 1942
- Mokuleia Airfield, Hawaii, 8 July 1942
- Plaine Des Gaiacs Airfield, New Caledonia, 22 July 1942
- Luganville Airfield, Espiritu Santo, New Hebrides, 23 November 1942
- Kualoa Point Field, Hawaii, 8 April 1943
- Funafuti Airfield, Nanumea, Gilbert Islands, 9 November 1943
- Mokuleia Field, Hawaii, 9 January 1944
- Kahuku Army Air Field, Hawaii, 19 March 1944
- Mokuleia Field, Hawaii, 13 June 1944
- Agana Airfield, Guam, Marianas Islands, 22 September 1944
- Yontan Air Base, Okinawa, Ryukyu Islands, 2 July 1945
- Fort William McKinley, Luzon, Philippines, 11 December 1945
- Northwest Field (Guam) (later Harmon Field), Guam, 15 May 1946 – 20 October 1948
- Carswell Air Force Base, Texas, 1 December 1948
- Altus Air Force Base, Oklahoma, 13 December 1957 – 1 June 1960
- Wright-Patterson Air Force Base, Ohio, 1 June 1960 – 1 February 1963
- Creech Air Force Base, Nevada. 9 November 2006

=== Aircraft ===
- Standard J-1, 1917–1919
- Curtiss JN-4, 1917–1919
- Airco DH.4, 1917–1919, 1923–1931
- Douglas O-2, 1926–1933
- Curtiss O-11 Falcon, 1930–1932
- Thomas-Morse O-19, 1930–1935
- Keystone B-3, 1935–1936
- Keystone B-4, 1935–1936
- Keystone B-5, 1935–1936
- Douglas B-18 Bolo, 1940–1941
- Boeing B-17 Flying Fortress, 1941–1943
- Consolidated B-24 Liberator, 1943–1945
- Boeing B-29 Superfortress, 1946
- Convair B-36 Peacemaker, 1949–1957
- Boeing B-52 Stratofortress, 1958–1963
- General Atomics MQ-1 Predator, 2006–2013
- General Atomics MQ-9 Reaper, 2006-2020; 2026–present

== Decorations ==

- Distinguished Unit Citation

South Pacific, 31 July-30 November 1942

- Navy Presidential Unit Citation

Pacific Theater, 7 August-9 December 1942

- Air Force Outstanding Unit Awards

6 August 1954 – 15 July 1957
27 October 1958 – 1 June 1960
28 May 2019

- Meritorious Unit Award

15 November 2019

== See also ==
- List of American aero squadrons
- List of B-52 Units of the United States Air Force
