= Horace Meek Hickam =

United States Army Air Corps officer

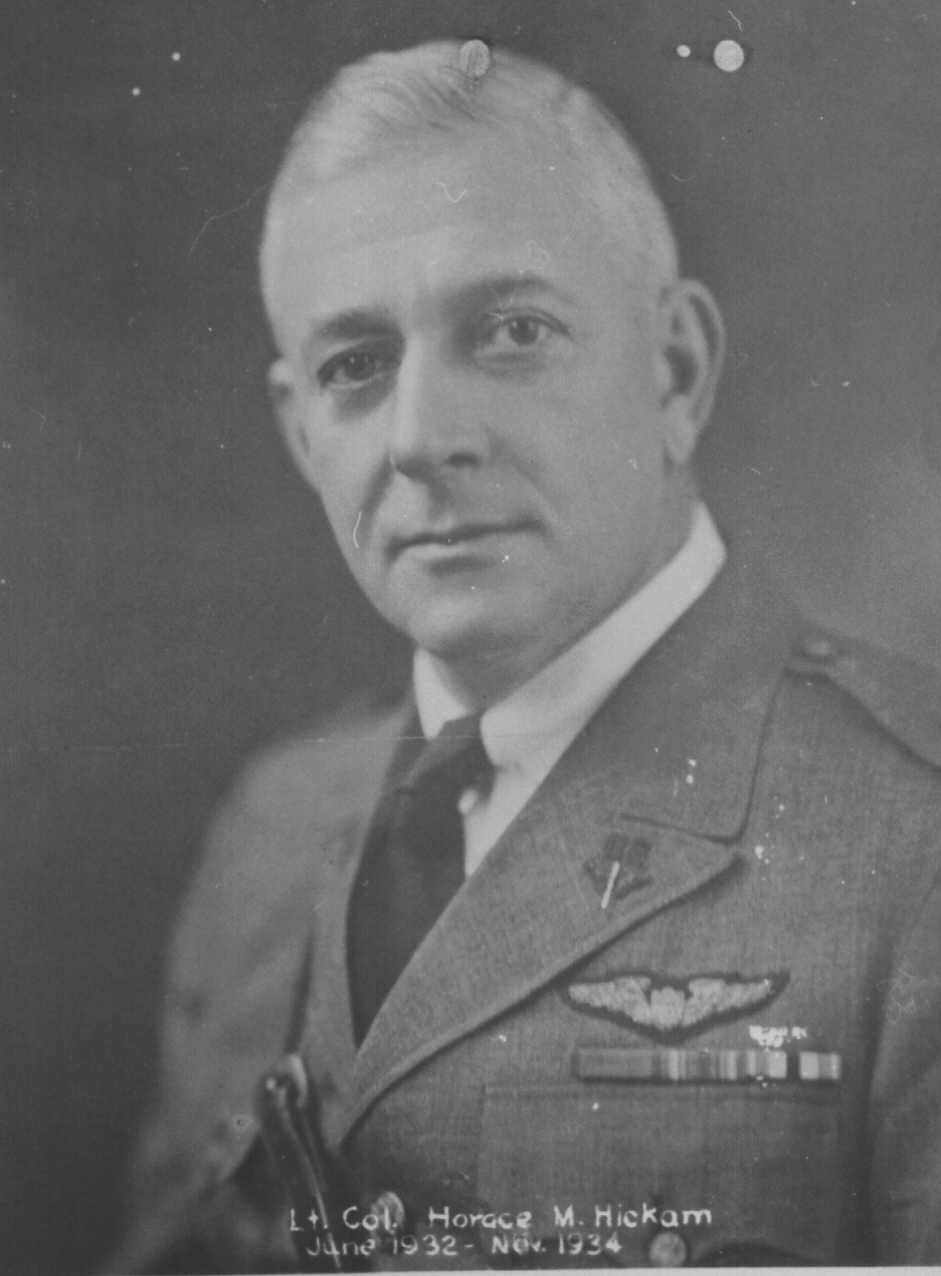
- Colonel Horace Hickam
- Born: August 14, 1885; Spencer, Indiana, US
- Died: November 5, 1934 (aged 49); Galveston, Texas, US
- Burial place: Arlington National Cemetery; Arlington, Virginia
- Military career
- Allegiance: United States of America
- Branch: U.S. Army Air Corps
- Service years: 1908–1934
- Rank: Lieutenant Colonel
- Commands: 3rd Attack Group
- Conflicts: Mexican Punitive Expedition
- Awards: Silver Star

Horace Meek Hickam (August 14, 1885 – November 5, 1934) was a pioneer airpower advocate and an officer in the United States Army Air Corps. Hickam Air Force Base, Hawaii, is named in his honor.

== Background ==
The son of a lawyer, Hickam was born in Spencer, Indiana, the eldest of four children. While a student at the Indiana University in Bloomington, he was a member of the Indiana National Guard, then received an appointment to the United States Military Academy, where he excelled in both academics and athletics. Hickam graduated 46th in his West Point class on 14 February 1908 and was commissioned second lieutenant, 11th Cavalry, serving in Vermont 1908–09, Georgia 1909–11, and Texas 1911–13.

In 1911, while at Fort Sam Houston, Texas, Hickam received flying training in addition to his regularly assigned duties. In January 1914, he was transferred to the 8th Cavalry, then in the Philippines, arriving at Camp Stotsenberg in December 1913. A year later he was promoted to fill a first lieutenant vacancy in the 7th Cavalry, also at Camp Stotsenberg, and returned with the 7th Cavalry to the United States in December 1915 to Douglas, Arizona. He served in Mexico as part of the Mexican Punitive Expedition and saw action on March 19, 1916, at Guerrero; April 22, at Tomochic, Chihuahua, where he was awarded the Silver Star in an action against Villistas led by Candelario Cervantes; and at Piojo Canyon on June 20. In November 1916, Hickam left the 7th Cavalry to serve as a Professor of Military Science at the University of Maine and received promotion to captain of Cavalry, in May 1917, after the United States entered World War I. He joined the 18th Cavalry in July, but this unit was redesignated as field artillery.

== Air Service and Air Corps duty ==
Hickam's association with aviation began with the United States' entry into World War I. On 22 September 1917, he received temporary promotion to major in the Aviation Section, U.S. Signal Corps and was assigned to organize the Aviation Concentration Camp at Garden City, New York. From October 1917 to May 1918 he served as executive officer of the Aeronautical General Supply Depot and Concentration Barracks there.

In May 1918 he reported to Rockwell Field, California, for pilot training and received a Junior Military Aviator rating on 16 June 1918, as a member of the U.S. Air Service. Hickam continued advanced flying training at Dorr Field, Arcadia, Florida. From 30 September 1918 to 30 January 1919, he was commandant of both the Pursuit School and the Aerial Gunnery School at Carlstrom Field.

On January 21, 1919, Major Hickam was appointed chief of the Information Division, Office of the Director of Air Service, in Washington D.C., where he supervised the first written history of the Air Service. He reverted to his permanent rank of captain on 30 June 1920, received a promotion to major, Cavalry on 1 July, when the National Defense Act of 1920 took effect, and received a transfer to the Air Service in the grade of major on 6 August 1920.

In January 1923, Hickam became assistant commandant of the Advanced Flying School, Kelly Field, Texas, and commanded the 10th School Group to 1 August 1925. In November 1925, while a student at the Air Service Tactical School at Langley Field, Virginia, he testified on behalf of airpower and a separate Air Force before the Morrow Board, appointed by President Coolidge and chaired by Dwight Morrow to offset adverse political effects of the court martial of Billy Mitchell. After graduation from ASTS, Hickam next was a student at the Command and General Staff College (Fort Leavenworth, Kansas) 1926–27, and at the Army War College (Washington, D.C.) 1927–28, as preparation for a four-year detail to the War Plans Division of the General Staff.

Hickam was promoted to lieutenant colonel on March 1, 1932, and given command of the 3rd Attack Group, based at Fort Crockett, Galveston, Texas. From February to June 1934, during the Air Mail scandal, he commanded mail delivery operations in the Central Zone, headquartered in Chicago.

On May 10, 1926, while a student at the ASTS, he collided in mid-air during a flight formation with fellow student, Major Harold Geiger. Hickam parachuted to safety, and narrowly escaped death. This resulted in Hickam's initiation into the famed "Caterpillar Club," a fraternal order with membership based on surviving an emergency parachute jump.

== Death ==
Hickam was killed in a landing accident at Fort Crockett, Galveston, Texas, on November 5, 1934. Flying a Curtiss A-12 Shrike, 33-250, of the 60th Service Squadron, he was practicing night landings on an unlighted strip when his aircraft struck an embankment and flipped over. Hickam, age 49, was buried at Arlington National Cemetery.

== Honors ==
On May 21, 1935, a new flying field at Honolulu, Hawaii, was designated Hickam Field; it was activated on September 15, 1938, is now Hickam Air Force Base. The 80th anniversary of the dedication of Hickam Field was commemorated in Air Force Magazine on May 29, 2015.

Veterans of Foreign Wars Post 970 is named after Hickam. The post is located next to Hickam Air Force Base.
