= 11th School Group =

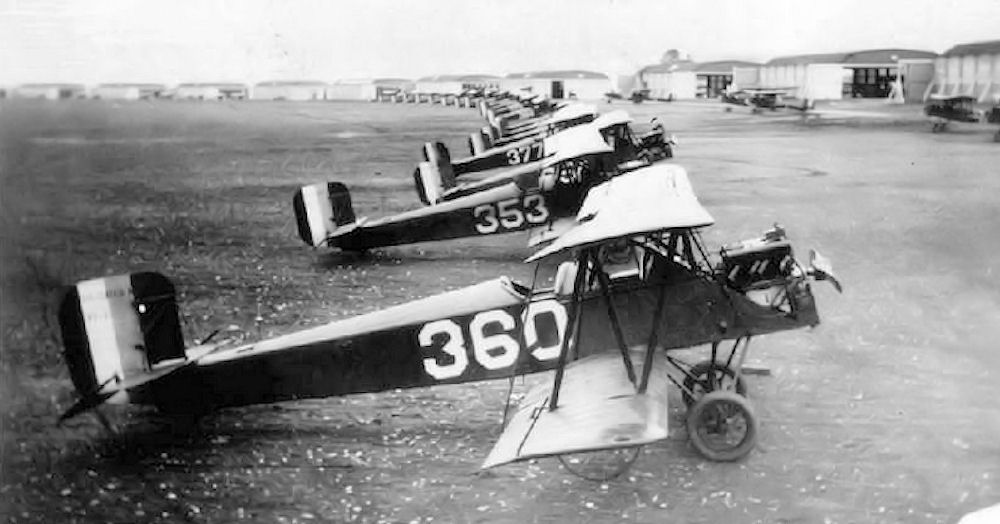
- 11th School Group Consolidated PT-1 trainers, Brooks Field, Texas, March 1926.
- Active: 1922-1931
- Country: United States
- Branch: United States Army Air Service; United States Army Air Corps
- Type: Command and Control
- Role: Flying Training

Commanders
- Notable commanders: Maj. Ralph Royce 1 September 1922 – 26 June 1926; Maj. James E. Chaney, 26 June 1926 – 16 July 1927; Maj. Shepler W. FitzGerald, 16 July 27 – 25 August 1930; Lt. Col. Henry B. Clagett, 25 August 1930 – 1 October 1931

Insignia
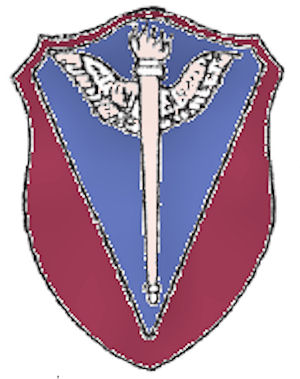
- 11th School Group Emblem

The 11th School Group was a United States Army Air Service and United States Army Air Corps unit. It was last assigned to the 24th School Wing, and was demobilized on 31 December 1931 at Brooks Field, Texas.

The unit was an early United States Army Air Service flying training group, becoming the center for Primary Army pilot training in 1922. It was demobilized in 1931 when primary flying training was consolidated at Randolph Field, Texas.

== History ==
Brooks Field, Texas opened in 1918 during World War I. It was the home of the Aviation Flight Instructor School during the war. With the end of the war, Brooks became the home of the Air Corps Balloon and Airship School in May 1919. Budget restrictions and other factors brought on a major Air Service reorganization in 1922. It was decided to move the Balloon and Airship School to Scott Field, Illinois and to consolidate aircraft flying training in San Antonio, Texas, with Brooks Field for Primary Training and Kelly Field for Advanced Training.

With the decision to consolidate made, the Air Service Primary Flying School at Carlstrom Field, Florida, was closed and a new one opened at Brooks Field. The 11th School Group was organized to perform duties as the headquarters for the new Air Corps Primary Flying School. Three Flying Training Squadrons (46th, 47th, 48th) were assigned to the group to train the flying cadets.

The Air Service revamped the course and extended it to nine months but later trimmed it to six with two classes a year. The first part consisted of ground school, stressing military training as well as classwork more directly related to the business of flying.

Flying training comprised the second half of the primary course. Starting with straight-and-level flying accompanied by an instructor in a dual trainer, the student advanced step by step until he could solo, execute a variety of maneuvers, and deal with many of the situations arising in flight. If the cadet review board (Benzine Board) did not get him, he graduated with the rating of junior airplane pilot (JAP). In 1927 basic flight training moved out of the advanced phase and combined with primary. At that point, primary-basic changed to eight months in length and advanced to four months.

When primary training got under way at Brooks field, the dual trainer was the Curtiss JN-6H Jenny. Brooks later accepted other planes, including Vought VE-7s and TA-3s, for evaluation, but Curtiss JNs were used until 1926. The beginning class in March of that year was the first without Jennies. Students now flew in the new Consolidated PT-1, with tandem seats and a Wright E engine.

The decision by the Coolidge Administration in 1926 to expand the Air Corps found the facilities in San Antonio were insufficient to accommodate the expanded number of cadets entering primary training. Also the growth of the City of San Antonio created hazards for training. As a result, two additional training squadrons (51st and 52d) were authorized at Brooks, and March Field, California, was re-opened as a primary pilot training school in July 1927 as a temporary measure. Plans were put into place to expand the facilities in San Antonio with a single large field outside of the city to house all flying training. The new field, which constituted the largest construction project for the Army Corps of Engineers since the Panama Canal was named Randolph Field.

By the fall of 1931, construction of Randolph was essentially completed, and the primary schools at Brooks and March were moved to the new installation. With the transfer of the school, the 11th School Group was demobilized on 31 December 1931.

=== Lineage ===
- Organized on 1 September 1922 as the 11th Group Headquarters (School)

Re-designated 25 January 1923 as 11th School Group
Demobilized on 31 December 1931

=== Assignments ===
- Air Service (later Corps) Primary Flying School, 1 September 1922
- 24th School Wing, 8 July 1927 – 31 December 1931

=== Components ===
Flying Training Squadrons

- 46th School Squadron 1 September 1922 – 31 December 1931
- 47th School Squadron 1 September 1922 – 31 December 1931
- 48th School Squadron 1 September 1922 – 31 December 1931
- 51st School Squadron 1 August 1927 – 31 December 1931
- 52nd School Squadron 1 August 1927 – 31 December 1931

Support Squadrons

- 62d Service Squadron, 1 September 1922 – 1 June 1931
- 20th Photo Section, 1927-1929
- 24th Photo Section, 1927-1929

=== Stations ===
- Brooks Field, Texas, 1 September 1922 – 30 April 1931

== See also ==
- Flying Division, Air Training Command
- Army Air Forces Training Command
- List of Training Section Air Service airfields

World War I training fields of the Air Service, United States Army
