= 13th School Group =

World War I era US military unit

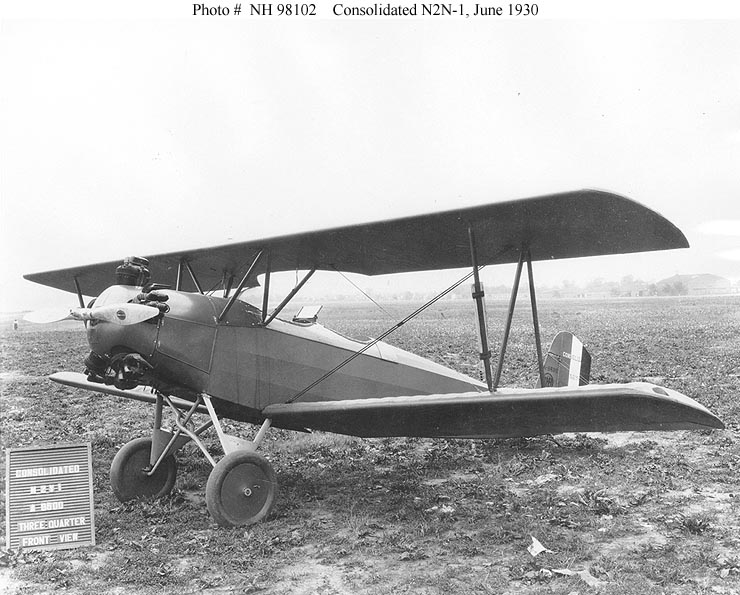
- Photo of a Consolidated N2Y trainer. The 13th School Group flew the Army model of this aircraft, the PT-3A at March Field
- Active: 1927–1931
- Country: United States
- Branch: United States Army Air Corps
- Type: Command and Control
- Role: Flying Training

Commanders
- Notable commanders: Capt. Rosenham Beam, 31 July – 22 August 1927; Maj. Millard F. Harmon, 22 August 1927 – 29 July 1930; Maj. Floyd N. Keesling, 29 July – 5 August 1930; Maj. Joseph T. McNarney, 5 August 1930 – 30 April 3131

The 13th School Group was a unit of the United States Army Air Corps. It was last assigned to the 24th School Wing, and was demobilized on 30 April 1931 at March Field, California. The unit was an early United States Army Air Corps flying training group, and the first major unit assigned to March Field after its re-opening in 1927.

== History ==
During World War I, March Field was a major primary pilot training base for the Air Service, with its graduates being sent to advanced training schools before being deployed to the American Expeditionary Force in France. The school was closed after the armistice in February 1919.

In July 1919, Congress authorized resumption of enlistment of flying cadets on a limited basis, and the school at March Field was re-opened which offered a combined ground school and primary flight training using surplus Curtiss JN-4 Jennies. A shortage of money and failure of the training program to become as large as planned, prompted the closing of the primary school at March Field in 1921, and March became a storage depot. In 1922 it was decided to centralize all flying training in San Antonio, Texas.

The decision by the Coolidge Administration in 1926 to expand the Air Corps found the facilities in San Antonio insufficient to accommodate the expanded number of cadets entering primary training. As a result, March Field was re-opened as a primary pilot training school in July 1927, and the 13th School Group was designated to perform duties as the headquarters for the new Air Corps Primary Flying School. Flight training was conducted in Consolidated PT-1 and PT-3s, which had taken over from the Curtiss Jennies. There were three school squadrons assigned, along with support squadrons.

Even before the school at March opened, it was known it was a temporary unit, as plans were ongoing to expand the facilities in San Antonio. With the opening of Randolph Field in 1931, the primary pilot training at March ended in April 1931 and March Field became the home of the new 1st Bombardment Wing.

The group was activated again in 1943, but Standard military units, based on relatively inflexible tables of organization were proving not well adapted to the training mission. Accordingly, a more functional system was adopted in which each base was organized into a separate numbered unit. The 13th Technical School Group was disbanded a year later when all units at Chanute Field were replaced by the 3502d Army Air Forces Base Unit.

== Lineage ==
- Constituted as the 13th Group (School) on 6 February 1923

Redesignated 8 March 1929 as 13th School Group
Activated on 31 July 1927
Disbanded on 30 April 1931

- Reconstituted and redesignated 13th Technical School Group

Activated on 28 February 1943
Disbanded on 30 April 1944

=== Assignments ===
- 24th School Wing, 8 July 1927 – 30 April 1931
- Central Technical Training Command, 28 February 1943 – 30 April 1944

=== Components ===
Flying Training Squadrons

- 47th School Squadron, 31 July 1927 – 30 April 1931
- 53d School Squadron, 31 July 1927 – 30 April 1931
- 54th School Squadron, 31 July 1927 – 30 April 1931

Support Squadrons

- 69th Service Squadron, 31 July 1927 – 30 April 1931
- 70th Service Squadron, 31 July 1927 – 30 April 1931
- 23d Photo Section, 31 July 1927 – 30 April 1931

=== Stations ===
- March Field, California, 31 July 1927 – 30 April 1931
- Chanute Field. Illinois, 28 February 1943 – 30 April 1944

== See also ==
- Army Air Forces Training Command
- List of Training Section Air Service airfields

World War I training fields of the Air Service, United States Army
