= 10th School Group =

Inactive USAF unit

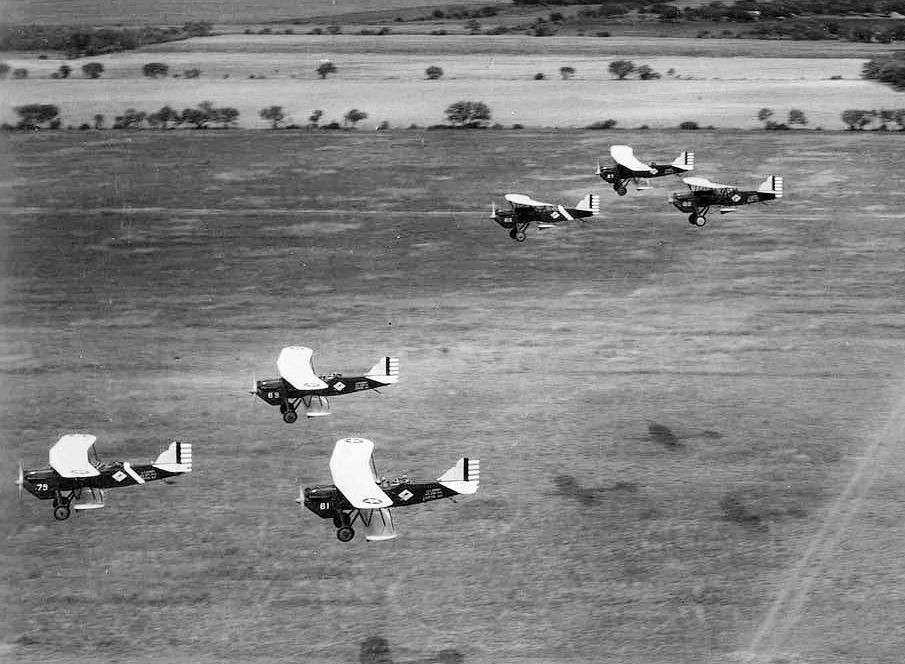
- 10th School Group Curtiss AT-4 Hawk Trainers in formation
- Active: 1922–1931
- Country: United States
- Branch: United States Army Air Service (later Corps)
- Type: Command and Control
- Role: Flying Training

Commanders
- Notable commanders: Maj. John N. Reynolds, 22 June-1 September 1922; Maj. Lewis H. Brereton, 1 September–November 1922; Lt. Col. John H. Howard, November 1922-16 January 1923; Maj. Horace M. Hickam, 16 January 1923 – 1 August 1925; Maj. Frank M. Andrews, 15 September 1925 – 1 September 1927; Capt. Raymond E. O’Neill, 26 April 1927 – 3 June 1928; Maj. James E. Chaney, 4 June 1928 – 1 July 1930; Maj. Clarence L. Tinker, 1 July-6 August 1930; Maj. Frederick L. Martin, 6 August 1930 – 15 July 1931

Insignia
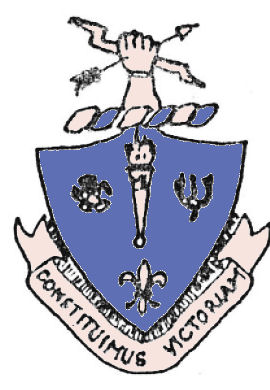
- 10th School Group Emblem

The 10th School Group is an inactive United States Air Force unit. It was last assigned to the 24th School Wing, and was demobilized on 15 July 1931 at Duncan Field (Kelly Field No. 1), Texas.

The unit was an early United States Army Air Service flying training group, becoming the center for Advanced Army pilot training in 1922. It was demobilized in 1931 as part of a reorganization of flying units in the San Antonio, Texas, area.

== History ==
=== Origins ===
Kelly Field, Texas, was the major Air Service facility in the United States during World War I. During the war, approximately 250,000 men were organized into aero squadrons at Kelly. Of the 23,000 who had begun preflight training during World War I, over 11,000 completed primary flying instruction, received their wings and were commissioned as 2d lieutenants before entering four weeks of advanced training either in the United States or Europe. Kelly Field graduated 1,459 pilots and 398 flying instructors during the course of the war.

Advanced flying training during the war occurred primarily at Ellington Field, Texas, where bombing instruction was taught. Taliaferro Field, Texas, among other locations, provided reconnaissance and observation training, while pursuit (fighter) courses were restricted to the 3d Air Instructional Center, Issoudun Aerodrome, France because of a lack of necessary equipment in the United States.

At the end of the war, the Air Service, along with the rest of the Army, faced crucial reductions and most wartime training fields were closed. Kelly, however, was one of the few that remained open. After a hiatus in training during 1919, pilot instruction resumed with both advanced pursuit and bombardment instruction being taught at Kelly, with the 1st Pursuit and 1st Day Bombardment Groups providing training in those branches of aviation. Cadets arriving at the 1st Pursuit Group in the summer of 1920 had finished primary training, but had not yet graduated from either JN-4 or JN-6 Jennies. Their advanced instruction at Kelly started with formation flying, stunting in formation, combat with camera guns, observation, elements of bombing, and elementary gunnery in JN training planes. After flying in Dayton-Wright DH-4s the students progressed to Royal Aircraft Factory S.E.5s.

=== Advanced Flying School ===
Budget reductions and a need for better coordination of flight training brought on a major Air Service reorganization in 1922. San Antonio thereupon became the flying training center of the Air Service. In the reorganization of 1922, the Air Service opened an Advanced Flying School at Kelly Field to take over training formerly performed by the tactical units and by the Observation School at Post Field, Oklahoma. To accommodate this consolidation, the Air Corps Advanced Flying School was organized at Kelly Field Number 1, which let the tactical units operate from the main field (Kelly Field Number 2). The 10th School Group was organized on 19 July 1922 to perform duties as the headquarters for the school. Four Flying Training Squadrons (40th, 41st 42d 43d) were assigned to the group to train the students.

The pursuit course taught pilots tactics; acrobatics; and fancy formation, night, and cross-country flying. They became proficient in landing on small fields, aerial gunnery, individual combat, battle maneuvers, and bomb dropping. Initially flying Curtiss Jennies for gunnery training, they were assigned to DH-4s and then to SE-5s. Training exposed them to Army paperwork and the duties of operations, armament, radio, engineering, supply, and mess officers. Running about six months, the course aimed to do more than just qualify men for the silver wings of the airplane pilot. It sought to turn out first-rate pursuit pilots who were confident, accurate flyers and excellent shots, possessing quick keen judgment.

Advanced training in bombardment and observation, like that in pursuit, entailed work in classrooms and hangars as well as in the air. Students flew DH-4s and were schooled in flying, bombsights, camera obscura, gunnery, and, among other things, the history of the development of aviation.

At the Observation School, students transitioned to and learned DH-4 airplanes. There were courses on formation and cross-country flying; visual and photographic reconnaissance; surveillance; intelligence; liaison with ground forces; observation and adjustment of artillery fire; map reading; meteorology; maintenance and operation of radio, telephone, and telegraph; Liberty engines; and rigging.

Cadets completing advanced training were certified for appointment in the Officers' Reserve Corps. Most newly rated pilots who had enlisted as cadets took discharges and entered the Reserve Corps. Those who had been enlisted men when they entered flying training reverted to their enlisted rank and remained on duty. Under Army and Air Service regulations, enlisted men who went through pilot training and were certified for or held Reserve commissions were permitted to pilot aircraft. In fact, there were suggestions that the Air Service use more enlisted and fewer commissioned pilots, if for no other reason than to save money. Some people would go so far as to let enlisted men be pilots in tactical units, with commissioned officers serving as their flight leaders and commanders.

However, the Air Service wanted all pilots to be commissioned officers as it cost the government at least $25,000 to teach a man to fly. Assuming the enlisted graduate elected to stay in the Air Corps, he had but a few years (perhaps just a few months) before he could no longer pass the physical examination for flying. An officer at this point could still serve in administrative and staff positions. But an enlisted pilot who could no longer fly was of no more use than an ordinary enlisted man. Enlisted pilots often sought more lucrative jobs available in civilian life. Their Reserve commissions also created a problem. While some Reserve officers served as enlisted men, others served as officers. Nevertheless, the Air Service always had some enlisted pilots during the 1920s. A board of officers reviewing the program suggested enlisted pilots be used chiefly as transport and ferrying pilots rather than in tactical units.

The Advanced Course at Kelly originally ran eight months but later was reduced to six with two classes a year. Each student chose one of the branches of aviation (Pursuit, Bombardment, Observation). Graduates got the rating of airplane pilot. In the late 1920s, the World War I Curtiss Jennies, SE-5s and the DH-4s were phased out, and the Air Corps began ordering modifications of the Curtiss P-1 Hawk for pursuit training (AT-4, AT-5 and AT-5As). Bombardment training was performed in the Keystone B-4A, while reconnaissance and observation was taught in the Thomas-Morse O-19E and the O-39 Falcon.

In 1925, Kelly Field No. 1 was renamed Duncan Field in honor of Lieutenant Colonel Thomas Duncan. Formerly stationed at Kelly Field, Duncan died in an airplane accident at Bolling Field in Washington, DC. Kelly Field No. 2 became simply, Kelly Field. However, both fields conducted their training, maintenance, command, and supply functions separately for the next 18 years.

The decision by the Coolidge Administration in 1926 to expand the Air Corps mainly affected the primary flying school. However, a fifth advanced training squadron (39th) was added to the group in 1927. In 1929, the 48th School Squadron was added as a sixth squadron.

=== Inactivation ===
Initially, plans were to consolidate all flying training in San Antonio at the new Randolph Field as the growth of the City of San Antonio created hazards for training. However, it was found that Randolph Field would become quite congested with only primary and basic training located there. In 1931, a reorganization of flying training in the Air Corps led to the demobilization of the 10th School Group, and its squadrons being transferred to Randolph. The advanced school at Kelly, however, remained with students being assigned directly to the school. (This changed in 1936, when students were assigned to designated squadrons (61st, 62d, 63d, 64th) instead of directly to the school).

=== Lineage ===
- Organized as 10th Group Headquarters (School) on 22 June 1922

Re-designated as 10th School Group 25 January 1923
Demobilized on 15 July 1931

=== Assignments ===
- 1st Wing (Provisional), 19 July 1922
- 1st Wing, 6 February 1923
- 24th School Wing, 8 July 1927 – 15 July 1931

=== Components ===
Flying Training Squadrons

- 39th School Squadron, 1 August 1927 – 15 July 1931
- 40th School Squadron, 10 June 1922 – 15 July 1931
- 41st School Squadron, 10 June 1922 – 15 July 1931
- 42d School Squadron, 10 June 1922 – 15 July 1931
- 43d School Squadron, 10 June 1922 – 16 July 1931
- 48th School Squadron, 8 May 1929 – 15 July 1931

Support Squadrons

- 68th Service Squadron 1923–31
- Air Park No. 13 1922–23
- 22d Photo Section 1922–31

=== Stations ===
- Kelly Field No. 1 (later Duncan Field), Texas, 19 July 1922 – 15 July 1931

== See also ==
- Flying Division, Air Training Command
- Army Air Forces Training Command
- United States Army World War I Flight Training

World War I training fields of the United States Army Air Service
