= 24th School Wing =

Former US military unit

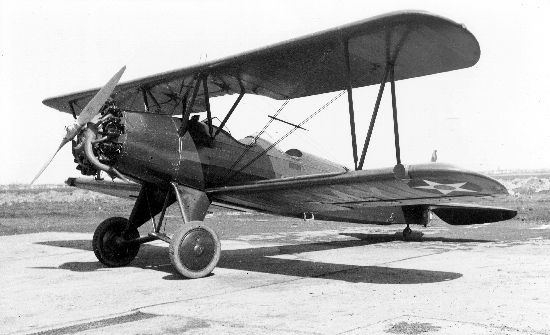
- The Consolidated PT-3 was the standard Air Corps Primary trainer in the late 1920s and early 1930s
- Active: 1927–1931
- Country: United States of America
- Branch: United States Army Air Corps
- Type: Flying Training Command and Control

Commanders
- Notable commanders: Maj. James E. Chaney, 31 August 1927 – 6 August 1930; Maj. Frederick L. Martin, 6 August 1930 – 22 September 1931; Maj. Max F. Schneider, 22 September – 1 October 1931

The 24th School Wing was a training unit of the United States Army Air Corps. It was last assigned to the Air Corps Advanced Flying School, and was disbanded on 1 October 1931 at Kelly Field, Texas. While active, the wing served as the headquarters for the Air Corps' three groups training aircrew, which were located in Texas and California.

The 24th School Wing is not related to the United States Air Force 24th Special Operations Wing, which was established on 19 November 1942.

== History ==
The 24th School Wing was organized at Kelly Field, Texas in 1927 to command the flying training units of the Air Corps. Air Corps Flying Schools were located in the San Antonio, Texas area at Kelly Field and at Brooks Field and at March Field near Riverside, California.

In 1922, the Air Corps had reorganized the method it used for pilot training, with Brooks Field, Texas becoming the center for primary training and Kelly Field, Texas the center for advanced training. By 1927, three training squadrons had been set up at Brooks and five at Kelly. With the beginning of the five-year expansion program of the Air Corps in 1926, it was found that the existing facilities in the San Antonio area would be insufficient to support the expansion, and a third training group would need to be established at March Field, a former World War I training field which had been closed in 1922. With a third group of four squadrons at March, a wing was needed as an intermediate level of command to avoid having too many units being assigned directly to school Headquarters at Kelly Field. Upon activation at Kelly Field, the wing transferred personnel from the 10th School Group.

In the late 1920s, the growth of the City of San Antonio created hazards for pilot training. In June 1927 General Frank Lahm suggested the construction of a single large field outside of the city to house all flying training. Congress funded the new field's construction but not the purchase of the land, so the city of San Antonio borrowed the $546,000 needed to purchase the site selected for what became Randolph Field. By the fall of 1931, construction was essentially completed at the new facility, so the Air Corps Training Center at Kelly Field and the primary schools at Brooks and March moved to the new installation.

With the opening of facilities at Randolph, the school at March Field was closed and March became a tactical flying field. The 24th School Wing was disbanded on 1 October 1931 and its subordinate units were absorbed into the Air Corps Primary Flying School at Randolph Field and the Advanced Flying School at Kelly Field. Wing personnel were transferred to the 10th School Group.

== Lineage ==
- Constituted in the Organized Reserve on 23 March 1924 as 24th Wing Headquarters (School)

Withdrawn from the Organized Reserve 1 August 1927 and allotted to the Regular Army
Activated on 1 August 1927
Redesignated as 24th Wing (School) in July 1928
Redesignated 24th School Wing on 8 March 1929
Disbanded on 1 October 1931

=== Assignments ===
- 12th Air Brigade (School), 23 March 1924 (Organized Army Reserve, not active)
- Air Corps Advanced Flying School, 1 August 1927 – 1 October 1931

=== Components ===
- 10th School Group, 1 August 1927 – 15 July 1931

Kelly Field, Texas

- 11th School Group, 1 August 1927 – 1 October 1931

Brooks Field, Texas

- 13th School Group, 1 August 1927 – 30 April 1931

March Field, California

=== Stations ===
- Kelly Field, Texas, 1 August 1927 – October 1931

== See also ==
- Flying Division, Air Training Command
- Army Air Forces Training Command
