= Training Command =

Training Command may refer to:

Albania

- Albanian Training and Doctrine Command

Australia

- Training Command - Army (TC-A), Australian Army, now part of "Forces Command"
- Training Command (RAAF) (1953–2006), now named "Air Force Training Group RAAF"

Bangladesh

- Army Training and Doctrine Command

Canada

- Canadian Forces Training Command

India

- Army Training Command
- Training Command

Korea

- Republic of Korea Air Force Education and Training Command

Pakistan

- PAF Air Education and Training Command

Serbia

- Training Command

Singapore

- Training Command (Singapore)

Sri Lanka

- Army Training Command (Sri Lanka)

UK

- RAF Flying Training Command
- RAF Personnel and Training Command
- RAF Technical Training Command
- RAF Training Command

USA

- Air Education and Training Command (since 1993), United States Air Force
- Air Training Command (1946–1993), United States Air Force
- Army Air Forces Training Command (1943–1946), U.S. Army Air Force
- Central Flying Training Command
- Central Technical Training Command
- Eastern Flying Training Command
- Eastern Technical Training Command
- Maritime Civil Affairs and Security Training Command
- Naval Air Training Command
- Naval Education and Training Command
- Naval Nuclear Power Training Command
- Naval Special Warfare Advanced Training Command
- Northwest African Training Command
- Recruit Training Command, Great Lakes, Illinois
- USAAF Central Technical Training Command
- Western Flying Training Command
- Western Technical Training Command
- 108th Training Command (Initial Entry Training) (since 1946), United States Army Reserve
