= Army Air Forces Training Command =

Former command of the U.S. Army Air Forces (1942-1946)

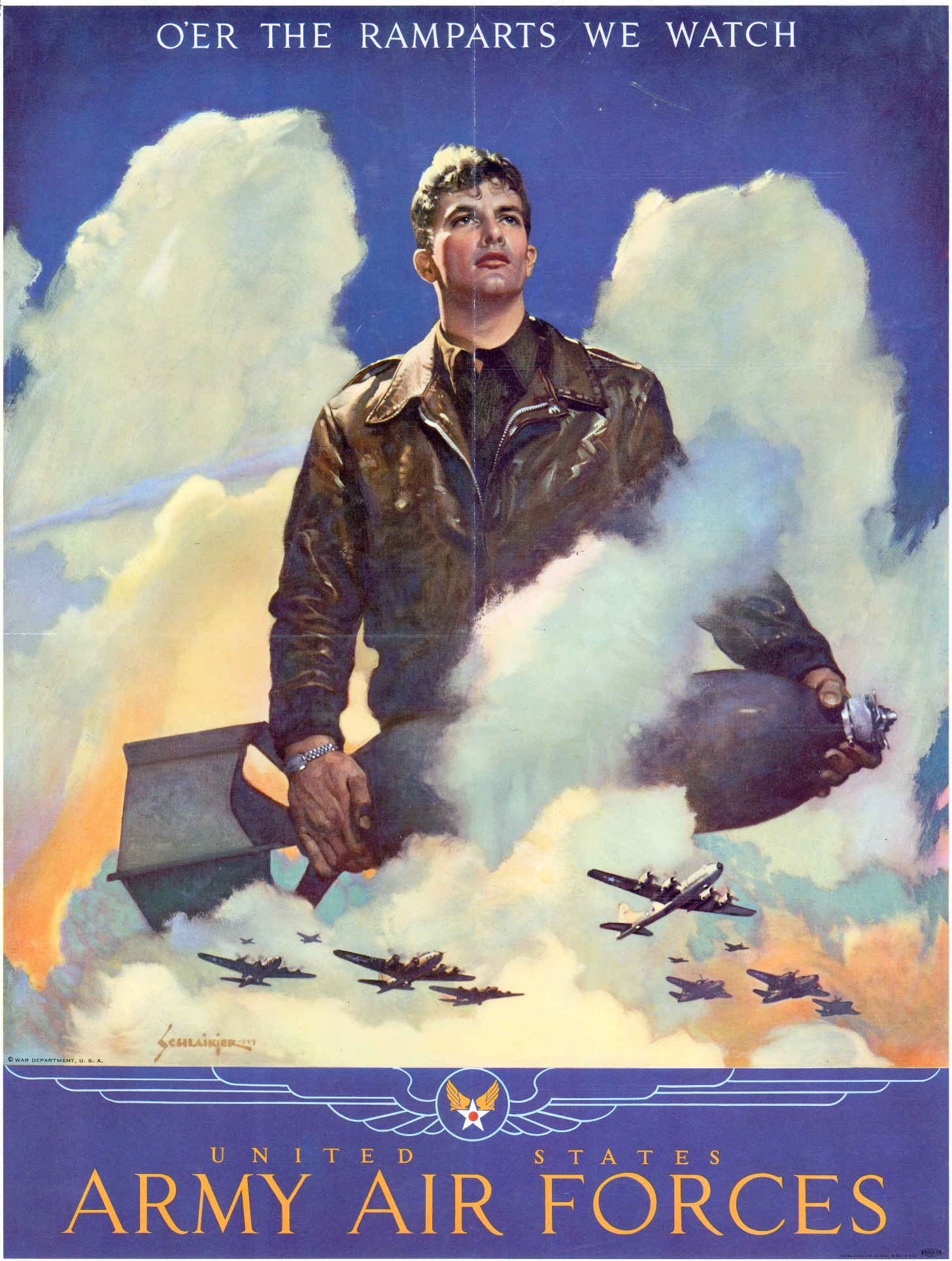
- United States Army Air Forces recruiting poster
- Active: 1942–1946
- Disbanded: 1 July 1946
- Country: United States
- Branch: Army Air Forces
- Type: Command and Control
- Role: Training
- Size: Command
- Part of: Army Air Forces
- Garrison/HQ: Fort Worth, Texas
- Nickname: AAFTC
- Motto: Sustineo Alas
- Colors: Ultramarine blue and golden orange
- Engagements: World War II – American Campaign

Commanders
- Notable commanders: Lt. Gen. Barton K. Yount

Insignia
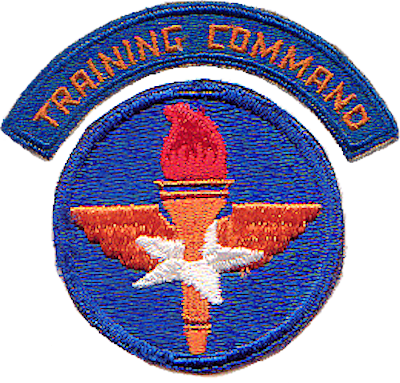
- Shoulder sleeve insignia

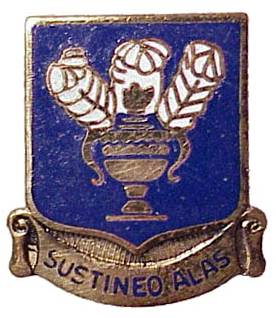
- Distinctive unit insignia

The United States Army Air Forces during World War II had major subordinate Commands below the Air Staff level. These Commands were organized along functional missions. One such Command was the Flying Training Command (FTC). It began as Air Corps Flying Training Command on 23 January 1942, was redesignated Army Air Forces Flying Training Command (AAFTC) on 15 March 1942, and merged with Army Air Forces Technical Training Command to become Army Air Forces Training Command on 31 July 1943. Continuing service after the war, it was redesignated Air Training Command on 1 July 1946. During the consolidation of Air Force Major Commands in the retrenchment of the 1990s, Air Training Command assumed control of Air University and became Air Education and Training Command on 1 July 1993—today's Air Education and Training Command (AETC), which celebrated its 75th anniversary 23 January 2017. see the Lineage and honors statement for AETC.

Army Air Forces Flying Training Command's mission was conducting the flying program for new Army pilot candidates and air cadets. The program was divided in to stages including primary, advanced and specific classification such as pursuit, twin engine and multi-engine. These phases were prelude to Operational or Replacement training or crew training.

== Overview ==
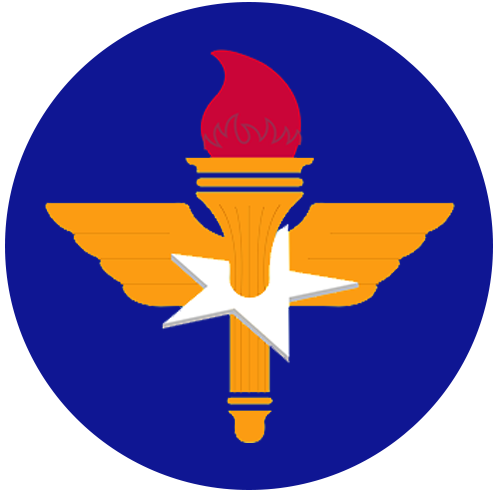
USAAF Training Command SSI

AAFTC was created as a result of the merger of the Army Air Forces Flying Training Command and the Army Air Forces Technical Training Command on 31 July 1943. Constituted and established on 23 January 1942. Its mission was to train pilots, flying specialists, and combat crews. Re-designated on or about 15 March 1942, after the Army Air Forces became an autonomous arm of the United States Army.

During its lifetime, the command struggled with the challenge of a massive wartime expansion of the air forces. Throughout 1942, the need for combat crew personnel far exceeded the current and contemplated production of the command's flying training schools. The rate of expansion of housing and training facilities, instructors, as well as the procurement of aircraft and other equipment, though at a breakneck pace, constrained the rate of increase of production. Facilities were used to their maximum capacity as quickly as they could be stood up. Some schools were expanded while they were still under construction. New airfields had to be located in areas with sufficient flying space free of other air traffic, and the West Coast training center faced the extraordinary requirement to avoid sites near the internment camps for Japanese-Americans.

== History ==
During World War II, the training of its officers and enlisted men was one of the chief functions of the United States Army Air Forces, consuming a great deal of money, people, equipment, and time. Such training encompassed both flying personnel along with the ground support personnel needed to have a military force trained to defeat the enemy forces threatening the United States.

When the Air Corps began to lay its plans for expansion in the fall of 1938, one of its major tasks was the provision of facilities for the additional thousands of men to be trained in (1) basic military courtesies, customs and traditions, to include classification of personnel for advanced training. (2) Flying and flight crew operations of military aircraft, and (3) the technical training necessary for the even larger numbers of men to be taught to service and maintain aircraft and aircraft equipment.

=== Basic Military Training and Classification ===
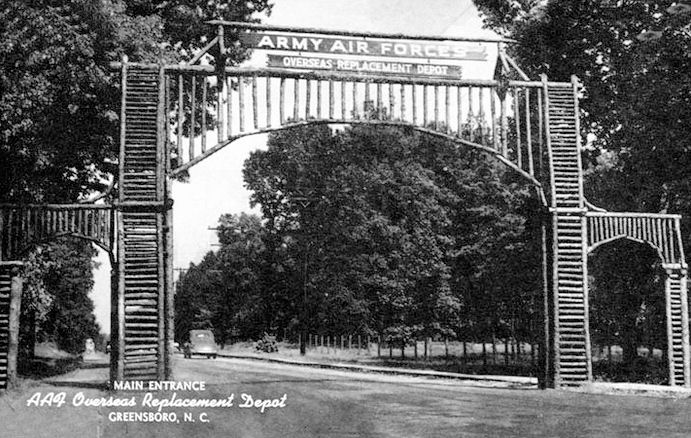
Entrance gate to the Greensboro Center, welcoming new recruits to the United States Army Air Forces

The United States has traditionally fought its wars with a citizen military mobilized and trained after the emergency arises. Its members on their induction into the military face an abrupt transition to a life and pattern of behavior altogether foreign to their previous experience. For their assistance the military has provided an initial period of basic military training, a course of instruction intended to transform the raw recruit into an airman. Only after completion of basic training are recruits, in theory, advanced to instruction in the technical specialties to which they are assigned.

Upon entry into the Army Air Service in the 1920s, each man received some basic training. The mechanic school at Kelly Field, Texas (later Chanute Field, Illinois) emphasized technical training, and for the following two decades, the amount of military training provided to new enlisted personnel undergoing technical instruction varied with their unit commanders, who had sole responsibility for the program.

In 1935 efforts to change this arrangement began, but the real change occurred in 1939 when the Army proposed that each component arm and service set up their own enlisted replacement centers. Army Air Corps policy had been to furnish initial basic training for recruits at established stations, followed by about a month's preparatory training at Scott Field, Illinois, before they went to Chanute for specialized training.

==== Basic Training Centers (BTC) ====
In 1940 the War Department authorized the establishment of Air Corps enlisted replacement centers for the initial training of recruits. The Air Corps established the first of these centers at Jefferson Barracks, Missouri, in the summer of 1940, though formal activation did not occur until 21 February 1941. Since the road ahead for most AAF enlistees led toward some specialized technical training, the replacement centers were placed under the jurisdiction of the Air Corps Technical Training Command.

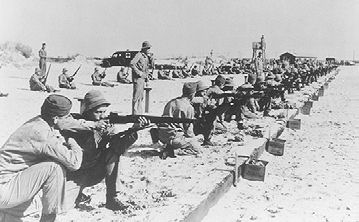
Basic small arms training on the beach, Atlantic City, New Jersey center, 1942

That fall the Technical Training Command activated two more basic training centers at Keesler Field, Mississippi, and Sheppard Field, Texas, where the command already had mechanic schools. A group of officers and enlisted men from Scott Field became the initial staff for Jefferson Barracks, and it, in turn, provided cadres to staff the replacement training centers at Keesler and Sheppard. These installations did the same for subsequent replacement training centers. The curriculum of indoctrination training lasted six weeks. It consisted of:

- Basic military general orders, military conduct, close order and open order drill.
- Familiarization with all standard weapons, assembly, cleaning and utilization.
- Physical training with obstacle course.
- Gas mask training and procedures.
- Rifle range qualification on the 30 cal carbine rifle
- One week of field training

By the time of the attack on Pearl Harbor, the Air Corps had 21,000 recruits at the three replacement training centers. The subsequently phenomenal growth of technical school quotas made these three centers inadequate to supply recruits for technical training, so the number of basic training centers expanded to 12 (plus one provisional center) by the spring of 1943. This included new dedicated BTC facilities set up at Greensboro, North Carolina, Miami Beach and St. Petersburg, Florida, and Atlantic City, New Jersey.

By mid-1943, the basic training mission declined in size because requirements for technical training centers were being met. Consequently, some of the 13 centers were inactivated, while others moved to technical training centers such as Amarillo Field, Texas, that had previously not had replacement training centers. As lessons from combat theaters found their way into the training program, more attention was paid to camouflage, individual security, defense against air attack, scouting and patrolling, and recognition of American aircraft--subjects combined in 1944 into a nine-hour course.

==== Military Operational Specialty (MOS) Classification ====
All men were tested during the recruit training and indoctrination period to determine their eligibility for assignment to meet the enlarged technical training goals. A soldier's qualification card (WD AGO Form 20), which occupied a central place in the scheme of classifying and assigning enlisted men, was filled out partly at the AAF reception center prior to entering training and more fully later at the BTC. This form was kept current throughout their career by the addition of pertinent information; it followed him wherever he went until he died in the service or was discharged, at which time the form was forwarded to the Adjutant General for permanent filing.

The AAF used a series of test batteries and interviews to ascertain the job experience and mental equipment of recruits. An important phase of the classification of recruits was the interview which uncovered such civilian experiences as skills derived from employment or hobbies and the extent and type of schooling. The objective was to establish a relationship between civilian occupational experiences and a job specialty that would be most useful to the AAF. After the interview a classifier reviewed the recruit's papers and made a recommended assignment to an MOS. By 1938, high school diplomas or direct, qualifying experience was required for entry in the Air Corps Technical School at Chanute Field, IL, but by World War II, the requirement was dropped to accommodate the vast numbers of personnel required to operate a vast Air Force.

Once the trainee was evaluated, tested and a recommended MOS assigned, after graduation they were assigned to various Advanced Technical Schools for specialization training. Recruits who were classified as possible flying personnel were sent to one of the three preflight and classification centers of the Flying Training Commands (Eastern, Central or Western) for further classification as a flying air cadet for, bombardier, navigator or flexible gunner training.

==== Officer Candidate/Training School ====
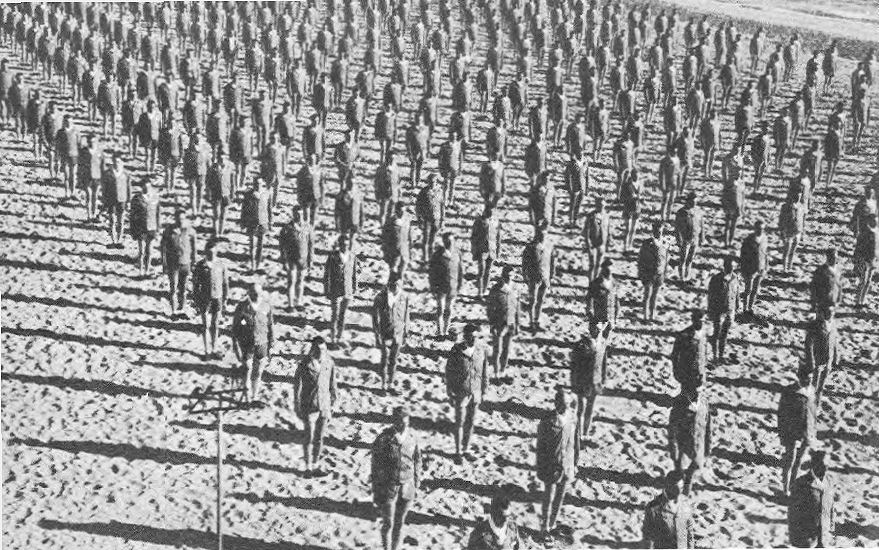
Officer candidates performing calisthenics on the beach, Miami Beach Training Center OCS training, Florida

Training for non-rated offers was needed to relieve flying officers of their nonflying duties during the wartime expansion of the Air Corps and the Army Air Forces. The Officer Candidate School began as a 12-week course, but it expanded to 16 weeks in 1943. It also began as a uniform program for all officer candidates, but after 1943 the last phase of training was divided into specialized training for adjutants and personnel officers, as well as supply, mess, intelligence, guard company, and training officers. Later, it expanded to include physical training and technical officers.

The Army Air Forces also commissioned some individuals with special qualifications directly from civilian life. These people required some military training, so Training Command also set up an Officer Training School (OTS) at the Miami Beach Training Center, Florida to provide six weeks of military instruction. Most OTS students were 30 years old or more, with the bulk of them in their 30s or 40s. They came from all walks of life, but most were teachers, businessmen, or professionals such as attorneys and accountants. Also, the value of World War I veterans ("Retreads") who had obtained professional degrees between the wars was utilized in administrative roles such as Station Adjutants and Group Ground Commanders and underwent OTS training. The majority were slated for administrative or instructional duties in the Army Air Forces, but there were others such as airline pilots who became Air Transport Command ferry pilots, under the wartime-era Service Pilot rating. Beginning in the winter of 1942, Medical, Dental, and Sanitary Corps officers also attended Officer Training School in courses separate from those for other officers.

==== Women's Army Auxiliary Corps ====
Public Law 554 on 15 May 1942 created a Women's Army Auxiliary Corps for service with the Army of the United States. In September 1943 the WAAC was replaced by the Women's Army Corps (WAC). The measure permitted the enlistment of 150,000 women between the ages of twenty-one and forty-five, but the executive order which established the corps set an initial strength limit of 25,000. It was typical of the AAF, with its long-cherished ideas of independence, to desire a separate women's corps completely independent of the women serving with other branches of the Army.

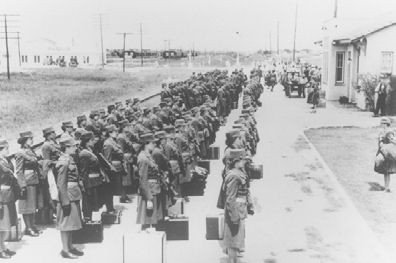
Members of the first WAAC contingent to arrive at Randolph Field, September 1942.

WAACs went through indoctrination training at Fort Des Moines, Iowa under Army Service Forces (ASF) auspices. Once completed, they began to arrive at Army Air Force stations in September. The influx of 27,000 recruits did not pose a major training problem for the AAF. There was no need for elaborate technical training because the majority of women, in contrast to the seventeen- and eighteen- year-old boys being inducted, had a usable skill before they enlisted, often in the highly prized clerical field. The AAF proposed and pioneered in a time-saving policy of avoiding unnecessary training for women already qualified.

AAF policy did not prevent specialist training for women who would benefit by it or were highly qualified for it; in fact, the AAF early opened to women virtually its entire roster of job specialties and schools. On 20 November 1943 WACs were declared eligible to attend any noncombat training course attended by AAF men, provided that the training would in a station commander's opinion increase an individual's job efficiency or would enable her to be utilized in some higher skill for which she had unusual aptitude or civilian background.

The job training of women was so completely integrated with the entire AAF training program that virtually no separate statistics are available as a basis for comparing the record of the women with male trainees. Obviously, this policy meant that the WACs had to be as well qualified as men to enroll in and graduate from a training course. It is known only that approximately 2,000 women completed courses in AAF technical schools, including those for Link-trainer instructors, airplane mechanics, sheet-metal workers, weather forecasters, weather observers, electrical specialists of several kinds, teletype operators, control-tower specialists, cryptographers, radio mechanics, parachute riggers, bombsight-maintenance specialists, clerks, photo-laboratory technicians, and photo-interpreters.

The AAF showed no reluctance in opening up its noncombat jobs to women, even jobs which required "unwomanly" mechanical skills. Toward the end of the war there was an increase in the number of women on technical assignments, when it became difficult to obtain enlisted men in the top intelligence brackets required by some of the work. At the peak of WAC enrollment, in January 1945, more than 200 different job categories were filled by enlisted women, while WAC officers held more than 60 different types of jobs in addition to that of company officer. A flexible system of assignment enabled the AAF to use WACs with special skills found in only a very few women, like those who were skilled as chemists, cartographers, geodetic computers, topographers, sanitary inspectors, and even dog-trainers. But as might be expected, a high percentage—-about 50 percent—-of the WACs held administrative or office jobs. These clerks, typists, and stenographers were doing what they had been doing in civilian life.

=== Flying Training ===
Until the late 1930s, flying training in the Air Service and Air Corps remained quite small after the rapid demobilization with the end of World War I. In 1922 all flying training was consolidated in Texas, considered to be an ideal location because of climate and other factors. Brooks Field became the center for primary training and Kelly Field, San Antonio, TX for advanced training. However, it was discovered that facilities in the San Antonio area were insufficient to accommodate the number of cadets entering primary training. Hence, in violation of the principle of geographic concentration, primary pilot training was also performed at March Field, California, from 1927 to 1931.

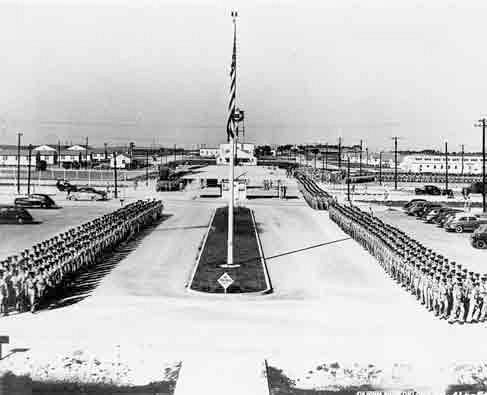
Cadets march through the main gate at the San Antonio Aviation Cadet Center. In the early 1940s, San Antonio was one of the three locations where Training Command processed and classified aircrew candidates for training.

Another problem for the training center was the growth of the city of San Antonio, which created hazards for training. Consequently, in June 1927 plans were created for the construction of a single large airfield outside of the city to house all flying training. The United States Congress funded the new field's construction but not the purchase of the land, so the city of San Antonio borrowed the $546,000 needed to purchase the site selected for what became Randolph Field. By the fall of 1931, construction was essentially completed, so the Air Corps Training Center at Duncan Field, San Antonio, Texas adjacent to Kelly Field and the primary schools at Brooks and March moved to the new installation.

Advanced training remained at Kelly because experience showed that Randolph Field would become quite congested with only primary and basic training located there. Following the expansion, the number of pilots in training declined until only 184 graduated in 1937, compared to an average of 257 per year prior to 1931. But with the emergence of Nazi Germany as a potential threat to the United States, the Air Corps proposed a period of expansion to train 4,500 pilots over a two-year period.

On 8 July 1940, the Air Corps reorganized its re-designated its training centers to manage the growing number of flying schools.

- The Southeast Air Corps Training Center headquartered at Maxwell Field, Alabama, managed those in the eastern third of the nation, basically east of the Mississippi River. This was upgraded to a command level on 31 July 1943 and re-designated as the Eastern Flying Training Command
- The Gulf Coast Air Corps Training Center at Randolph Field handled those in the central sector, from west of the Mississippi River to the Rocky Mountains. This was upgraded to a command level on 31 July 1943 and re-designated as the Central Flying Training Command
- The West Coast Air Corps Training Center at Moffett Field, California (later moved to Santa Ana Army Air Base), managed those in the western tier, consisting of the Pacific Coast to the Rocky Mountains. This was upgraded to a command level on 31 July 1943 and re-designated as the Western Flying Training Command

In addition to the American Air Cadets, Cadets from the British Royal Air Force and Free French Air Force were trained in flying skills. CFTC also operated aircrew schools for Navigators, Bombardiers and flexible aerial gunners. Radio operators were centrally trained at Scott Field, Illinois. Other aircrew positions, such as B-29 flight engineers and RADAR operators were also trained later in the war as training requirements presented themselves. This included the first jet pilots in 1945.

==== Flying Training Stages ====
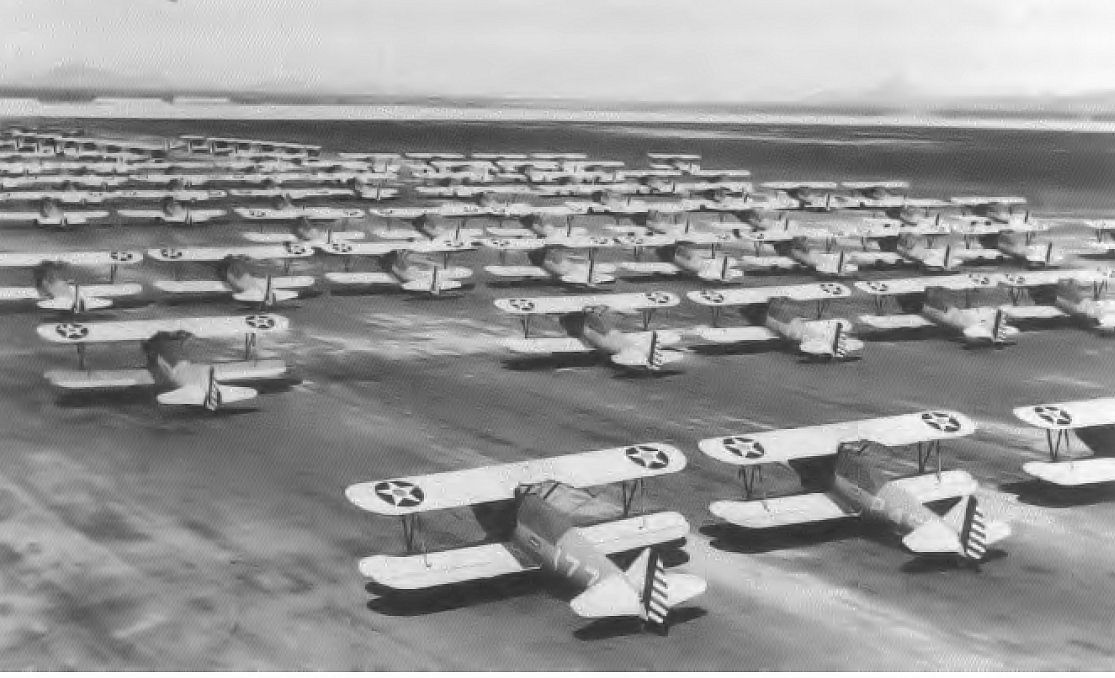
Photo of PT-13 Stearmans lined up at Randolph Field. These were the principal trainers used by the United States Army Air Corps in primary flight training.

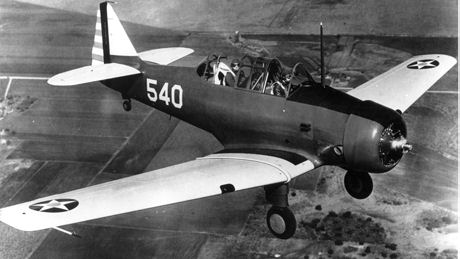
BT-13 "Valiant" which served as a basic trainer during the war years

Each of the geographically aligned flying training commands followed the same methodology for training Air Cadets. Training came in five stages.

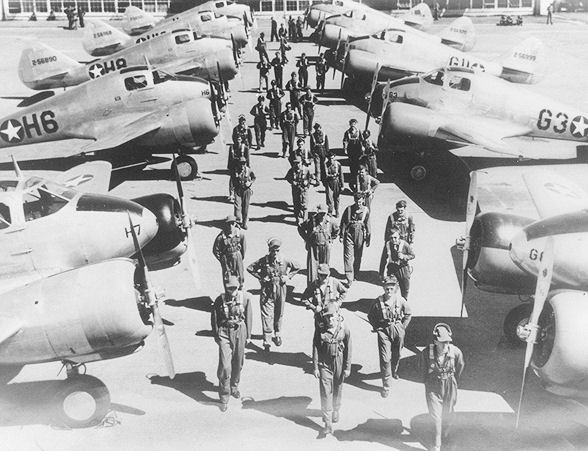
During 1943 the first class of twin-engine bomber instructors entered training at Randolph AAF, Texas. Shown here are a number of the instructor trainees walking between rows of AT-9 "Jeep" aircraft, one of the principal aircraft used in the advanced phase of pilot training.

The Initial classification stage lasted 1 to 2 weeks and processed the cadet and issued him his equipment. This was the stage where it would be decided whether the cadet would train as a navigator, bombardier, or pilot. The education and training stages were 9 weeks each. Each 9 week stage was divided into two 4.5 week (63 day) halves: a lower half and an upper half . The lower half was made up of students just beginning the stage and the upper half was made up of the students who were half-finished. The more experienced cadets would (hopefully) help the new cadets get through the section before they were promoted to the next stage.

===== Pilot Training Program =====
====== AAFTC Training Stages ======
- Pre-Flight stage taught the mechanics and physics of flight and required the cadets to pass courses in mathematics and the hard sciences. Then the cadets were taught to apply their knowledge practically by teaching them aeronautics, deflection shooting, and thinking in three dimensions. Typically, cadets reported to a preflight school at the San Antonio Aviation Cadet Center; Maxwell Field, Alabama, or Santa Ana Army Air Base, California.
- Primary Pilot Training taught basic flight using two-seater training aircraft. Performed at civilian-operated flight schools for primary training. At peak strength there were 56 such schools in operation. The most popular primary trainers were the Stearman PT-13 and PT-17 "Kaydet," the Fairchild PT-19 "Cornell," and the Ryan PT-20 "Recruit."
- Basic Pilot Training taught the cadets to fly in formation, fly by instruments or by aerial navigation, fly at night, and fly for long distances. Cadets flew aircraft such as the Vultee BT-13 "Valiant" and were evaluated to determine who should go into single-engine advanced training and who should proceed to twin-engine training.
- Advanced Pilot Training placed the graduates in two categories: single-engined and multi-engined. Single-engined pilots flew fighters and fighter-bombers. Multi-engined pilots learned to fly transports and bombers. First they flew Trainer aircraft, then transitioned to front-line aircraft. Those students selected for single-engine training flew the AT-6 "Texan," and those who went into twin-engine training flew the Curtiss AT-9 "Jeep," the all-wood Beechcraft AT-10 "Wichita," or the Cessna AT-17 "Bobcat."
- B-29 Superfortress Transition Training Until the fall of 1944, Second Air Force provided all B-29 Superfortress transition training for the Army Air Forces. Then, on 12 September 1944, HQ AAF directed Training Command to establish B-29 schools for the transition of crews consisting of pilots, copilots, and flight engineers. By late September, plans called for five schools to provide transition training in very heavy bombers, including a school for the TB-32 Dominator at Fort Worth, Texas. Training of pilots and flight engineers as instructors got underway at Maxwell Field, Alabama, on 20 September 1944, when the school took over facilities previously used for B-24 Liberator training. Limited availability of B-29s restricted training, but by November regular training of crews had begun at Maxwell on B-29s stripped of their armament and gear. Further expansion of training was limited by continued delays in the delivery of B-29s, so Second Air Force continued to provide the bulk of B-29 transition training.

====== OTU-RTU Training ======
Graduates of advanced training schools were commissioned as Second Lieutenants and awarded their "Wings" (Pilot, Bombardier, Navigator, Gunner). After completion of individual training, pilots were given eight to twelve weeks of training as a team in new combat groups using the same aircraft they would use in combat. This training was provided by one of the Numbered Air Forces (First, Second, Third, Fourth Air Force) at bases controlled by Operational Training Units (OTUs).

By the end of 1943, however, when the formation of new combat groups (except for B-29 units) was virtually completed and the demand for replacement pilots (to replace casualties) in the deployed combat groups was high, Replacement Training Units (RTU) replaced the OTUs. RTUs were also under the jurisdiction of one of the four numbered air forces. Men designated as replacements were sent to an RTU group where they received a similar though shorter course than that given in an OTU. As they completed the required phases of training, individuals and crews were drawn from the RTU and given deployment orders overseas to their assigned group in the combat areas.

Generally OTU-RTU training responsibility was set up as follows:

- Second Air Force was principal center for developing heavy (B-17, B-24) and very heavy (B-29) bombardment groups, and the training of replacement personnel
- First Air Force and Fourth Air Force trained fighter units. First Air Force generally trained P-47 Thunderbolt groups and replacement pilots, while Fourth Air Force trained P-38 Lightning two-engine groups and replacements. P-51 groups and pilots were trained generally equally by both air forces.
- Third Air Force trained light and medium bomber (A-20, A-26, B-25, B-26) units and also photo-reconnaissance units and pilots.
- I Troop Carrier Command performed the special task of training transport units and replacement pilots for air movement of troops and equipment.

Ferrying and transport pilot training for C-54s and other four-engine transports was managed separately by Air Corps Ferrying Command (later Air Transport Command). Initially the command trained its own crews by recruiting directly from civilian life a large number of flyers, many of the civilians were subsequently commissioned as non-combat service pilots, a rating for which the qualifications were somewhat lower than those for combat duty. However, as the number of routes and scope of Air Transport Command increased, the Air Transportation Division of ATC in time had to rely on military personnel. To provide training for use of its own planes and for the special requirements of its far-flung operations, the division began operating an OTU in 1942, drawing on the graduates of the Training Command advanced two and four-engine flight schools.

Air Transport Command operated a night and instrument training school at St. Joseph Army Air Field, Missouri. The school at Homestead Army Airfield, Florida was a four-engine transport school. Reno Army Air Base, Nevada specialized on training C-47 and C-46 pilots for China-India operations, flying "The Hump" across the Himalayan Mountains. Although Homestead and Reno conducted full transport crew training, graduation of students was on an individual, rather than crew, basis. A specialized fighter transition school for the ATC Ferrying Division was established at Palm Springs Army Airfield, California in November 1943, however it was moved in the spring of 1944 to Brownsville Army Airfield, Texas.

===== Aircrew Training Classifications =====
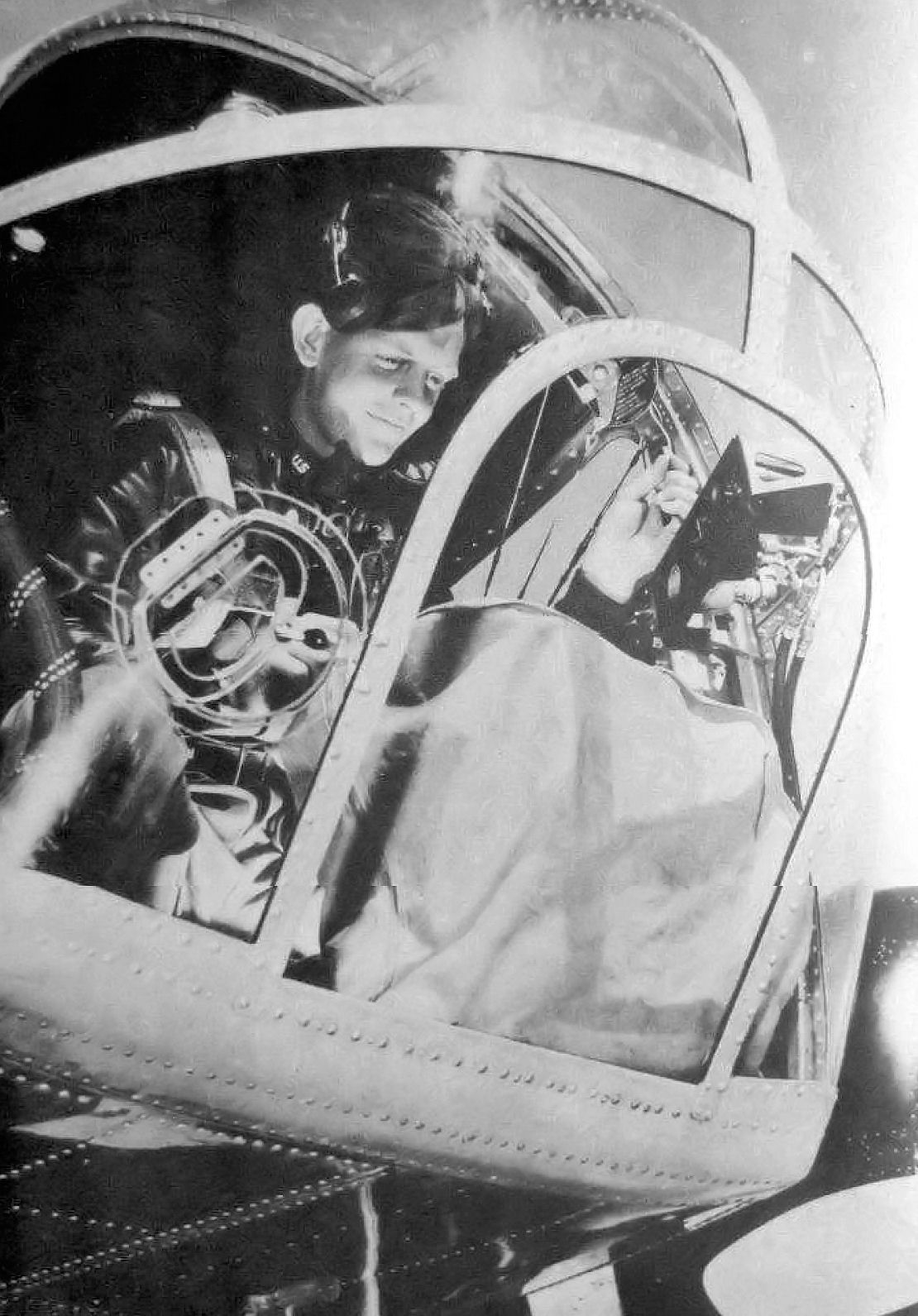
Bombardier Training dropping practice bombs from an AT-11 at Midland Army Airfield, Texas

- Bombardier Training

Nine locations in Central and Western Flying Training Commands provided bombardier training.

- Flexible Gunnery Training

At the time of the attack on Pearl Harbor, the Army Air Corps still did not have a specialized school for flexible gunnery. Three schools opened in December 1941, and the program grew rapidly. In July 1943 flexible gunnery schools had possessed few tactical aircraft with which to train, mainly 55 twin-engine B-34 Lexingtons (Lockheed Venturas). By December 1944 they had 440 four-engine aircraft (173 B-17 Flying Fortresses, 255 B-24 Liberators, and 12 YB-40 Flying Fortresses). By the latter date, students on gunnery missions fired from these, while two-engine aircraft towed targets and single engine tactical aircraft simulated attacks on the bombers. Unfortunately, towed targets hardly resembled attacking fighter aircraft, but one device that more closely simulated combat conditions was a camera gun that students "fired" at fighter aircraft flying in normal attack patterns toward the bombers. These cameras, which came into general use during 1944 and 1945.

- Flight Engineer Training

In putting together the curriculum for training pilots and copilots on the B-29 Superfortress, Training Command could make use of its experience in transition training for heavy bombers. No such experience was available in the case of flight engineers, because the B-29 was the first AAF aircraft that required a flight engineer. This individual operated the engine control panel of the aircraft. Located behind the pilot, the panel contained all operating instruments but those the pilot used to control the altitude and direction of the B-29. At the direction of the pilot, the flight engineer used these instruments to adjust the throttles, fuel mixture, supercharger, and propeller pitch. He also computed the aircraft's cruising range, fuel consumption, engine performance, weight and balance, and airworthiness. Flight engineers underwent comprehensive training at Amarillo and Lowry Fields before assignment to B-29 transition training.

- Navigator Training

Until the early 1930s, pilots had been their own navigators. Then as airlines began to make long-distance flights, they added a navigator to the flight crew. The military, however, continued to treat navigation training as part of pilot training. Consequently, when it, too, began to see a need for specialized navigators, in July 1940 the Army signed a contract with Pan American Airways, Incorporated, to provide training in navigation and meteorology to flying cadets, an arrangement that continued until 1944. In November 1940 the Air Corps opened its first navigator school at Barksdale Field, Louisiana.

==== Contract Primary Flying Training ====
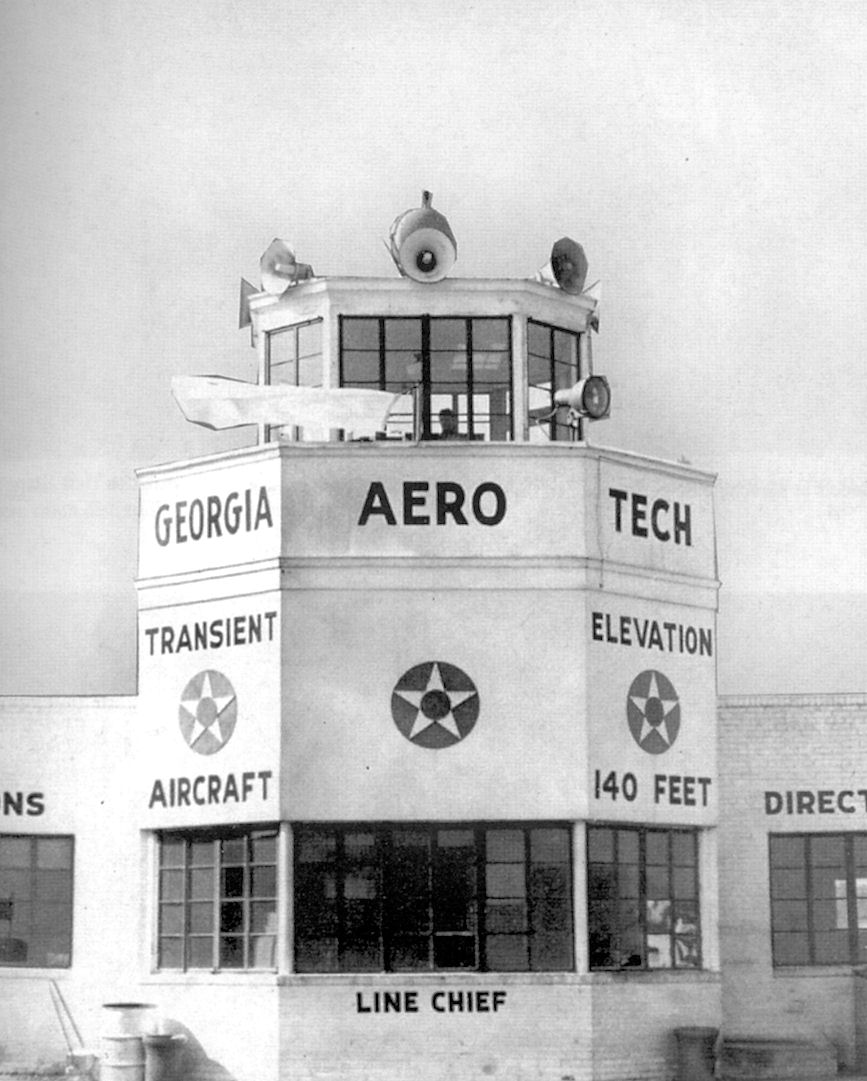
Control tower at Daniel Field, Georgia

Beginning in 1939, the Army contracted with nine civilian flying schools to provide primary flying training, while Randolph handled basic training, now completely separate from primary. Kelly Field, with Brooks as a subpost, took care of advanced flying training. In July 1939 the full course of flying instruction was shortened in length from a year to nine months—three for each phase. The number of primary contract schools expanded to 41 by the time of the Japanese attack on Pearl Harbor, and to 60 at various times in 1943.

To the flying cadets, the Contract Flying Schools (CFS) were just another training assignment—although the flight instructors were civilian contractors, the cadets still experienced the discipline and drudgery of military life. The CFS's were assigned to the various Flying Training Commands, and each had a designated USAAF Flying Training Detachment assigned for supervision and liaison with the command.

According to the contract, the government supplied students with training aircraft, flying clothes, textbooks, and equipment. Schools furnished instructors, training sites and facilities, aircraft maintenance, quarters, and mess halls. From the Air Corps, schools received a flat fee of $1,170 for each graduate and $18 per flying hour for students eliminated from training. Trainers used were primarily Fairchild PT-19s, PT-17 Stearmans and Ryan PT-22s, although a wide variety of other types could be found at the airfields.

At one time or another during World War II, 64 contract schools conducted primary training, with a maximum of 56 schools operating at any one time. During the course of the war, the schools graduated approximately 250,000 student pilots. All of the CFS's were inactivated by the end of the war.

==== Contract glider training ====
During World War II civilian flying schools, under government contract, provided a considerable part of the flying training effort undertaken by the United States Army Air Forces. In 1941 the Air Corps directed Flying Training Command to establish a glider training program. Contract schools opened soon after. Students learned to perform maintenance and, in an emergency, to rebuild wrecked gliders. This was a relatively simple operation, considering that the primary glider consisted of little more than a shell, equipped with radio, wheels, and brakes.

By late 1944 Training Command ended all glider instruction, both flying and technical. Rather than create a separate glider force, the Army Air Forces had decided it would be more profitable to train its troop carrier pilots to also operate gliders.

==== The Tuskegee Airmen ====
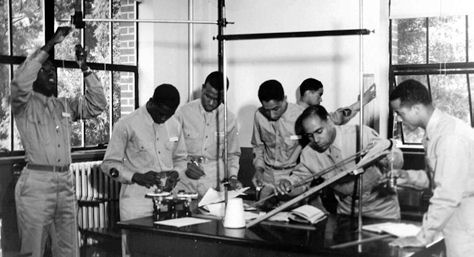
Aviation cadets conduct a physics class laboratory experiment at Tuskegee Institute

On 7 March 1942, the first African Americans to become military pilots received their wings at Tuskegee Field, Alabama. For many this event marked 25 years of determined effort to include blacks in military aviation. As early as 1917, Walter White, Director of the National Association for the Advancement of Colored People (NAACP), had called for the inclusion of blacks in the Air Corps only to be told that "no colored squadrons were being formed at the present time." Finally, on 21 March 1941, the Air Corps activated the 99th Pursuit Squadron, which became the first squadron of what became the renowned Tuskegee Airmen.

After the first class of five pilots graduated, it took until July 1942 for enough black airmen to complete flight training for the squadron to reach full strength. Even then, the Army was not ready to send black pilots overseas. Under the command of Capt Benjamin O. Davis, Jr., the 99th remained at Tuskegee and received additional training to prepare for combat. In April 1943 the unit deployed to French Morocco in North Africa.

Eventually enough graduates were available to comprise four fighter squadrons: the 100th, 301st, and 302d, all of which had also begun at Tuskegee before completing their training in Michigan. These squadrons, and the 99th were formed into the 332d Fighter Group.

As the war progressed the 332d's squadrons established an enviable combat record. On 11 July 1944, P-51 Mustangs from the 332d Fighter Group shot down 18 enemy fighters while flying escort for a large bomber formation. On 24 March 1945, while escorting B-17 Flying Fortresses during a raid on a tank factory in Berlin, the 332d's pilots downed three German jet fighters. For their actions, the 332d and three of its squadrons—the 99th, 100th and 301st—earned Distinguished Unit Citations.

==== Women Airforce Service Pilots ====
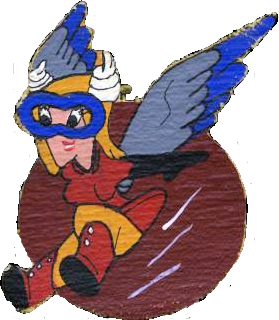
World War II WASP A-2 jacket patch.

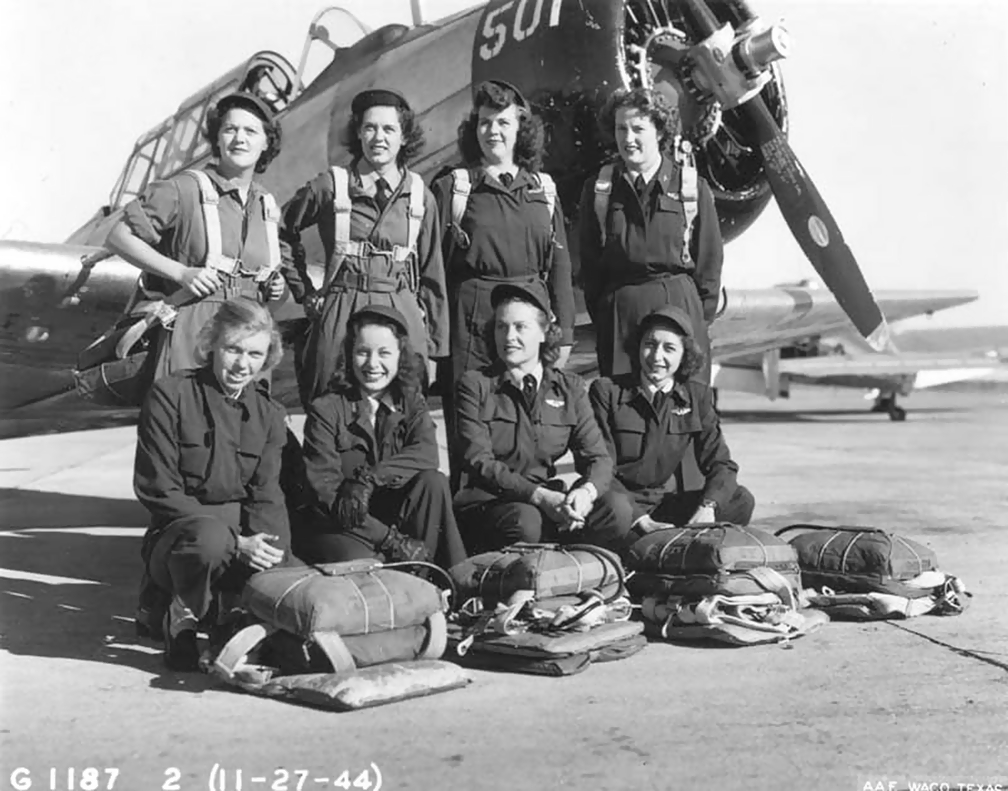
Eight WASPs gather on the ramp at Waco Field, Texas, for a final group picture before the WASP was disbanded on 20 December 1944

The Women Airforce Service Pilots of World War II were pioneers, the first licensed women pilots in the United States to fly military aircraft for a military service. The WASP was formed in August 1943 from two earlier, relatively independent programs for women pilots: Women's Auxiliary Ferrying Squadron (WAFS) and Women's Flying Training Detachment (WFTD).

As early as 1939, Jackie Cochran had suggested recruiting and training women to fly military aircraft. On 7 October 1942, shortly after the WAFS was formed, General Arnold inaugurated a flight training program to produce 500 women ferry pilots. He appointed Cochran as the director of flying training, and by October 1942, 40 women had been accepted and sent for training at Howard Hughes Airport in Houston, Texas. The unit was called the WFTD, or among the women it was known as the "Woofteddies".

When facilities at Houston proved too limited, a new school was opened in February 1943 at Avenger Field, Sweetwater, Texas, and training at Houston soon phased out. On 5 August 1943, the WAFS and the women of Cochran's WFTD school were united as the WASP. Cochran was named Director of Women Pilots, and Nancy Love continued in the WASP as executive of the Ferrying Division of the Air Transport Command.

Classes entered the WASP program at monthly intervals. A total of 18 classes completed training: 8 in 1943 and 10 in 1944. Of the 25,000 women who applied for flight training, 1,830 were accepted, and of those, 1,074 received their wings. Entrance requirements remained essentially the same as those for the WAFS, except the age requirement was dropped from 21 to 18, and the flight experience was set at only 200 hours. That requirement was later dropped to 35 hours, and the 200-horsepower rating requirement was eventually eliminated.

The WASPs flew all types of military aircraft, including North American AT-6 Texan, Beechcraft AT-10 Wichita, Beechcraft AT-11 Kansan, and Vultee BT-13 Valiant trainers; Douglas C-47 Skytrain, Douglas C-54 Skymaster, and Lockheed C-60 Lodestar transports; Curtiss A-25 Shrike (SB2C Helldiver) and Douglas A-26 Invader attack aircraft; Consolidated B-24 Liberator, North American B-25 Mitchell, Martin TB-26 Marauder, and Boeing B-29 Superfortress bombers; Lockheed P-38 Lightning, Curtiss P-40 Warhawk, Republic P-47 Thunderbolt, and North American P-51 Mustang fighters. In addition to ferrying, the WASPs performed many other tasks such as glider and target towing, radar calibration flights, aircraft testing, and other noncombat duties to release male pilots for overseas action. The WASPs flew approximately 60 million miles and suffered 38 fatalities, or 1 to about 16,000 hours of flying.

The WASPs were employed under the Civil Service program. It was always assumed they would become part of the Army when a proper place within the military organization could be found for them. In fact, bills were introduced in Congress to give them military rank, but even with General Arnold's support, all efforts failed to absorb the WASPs into the military. On 20 December 1944, the Army Air Forces, citing the changing combat situation, disbanded the WASP program. The WASPs returned to civilian life with no veterans' benefits.

In 1977 the United States Congress finally granted benefits to the 850 remaining WASPs.

==== Foreign flying training ====
In World War I, partially trained American pilots arrived in Europe unprepared to fight the Germans. They completed their training in French, British, and Italian schools in aircraft not available in the United States. Mechanics, too, received training overseas. The British helped train US ground crews at their airfields and in their factories. So too, did France. Based on that foundation, the air arm of the US Army grew quickly and compiled a credible combat record during World War I.

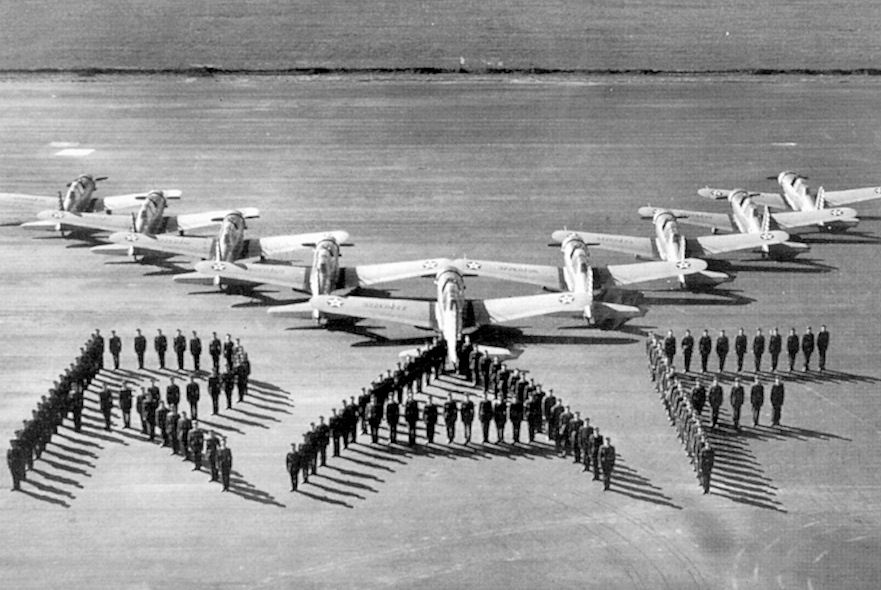
Royal Air Force cadets on parade at Cochran Army Airfield, Georgia, 1942

Two decades later, with World War II looming large, the United States had a chance to reciprocate. When the Lend-Lease Act became law on 11 March 1941, the British were isolated, facing a hostile continent. France had fallen in 1940, the British had retreated from Dunkirk at the same time, and the Germans had not yet reneged on the Hitler–Stalin non-aggression pact of 1939. Only the Royal Air Force (RAF), by denying air superiority to the Luftwaffe, had prevented a German invasion of the British Isles.

Aware of the RAF's urgent need for additional training facilities, the United States offered the British over 500 aircraft for use in the training of British pilots in the United States. General Hap Arnold also arranged for civilian contractors to set up schools exclusively for training British pilots. The schools would accept 50 RAF students every 5 weeks for a 20-week course in order to produce 3,000 pilots a year. Known as the British Flying Training School Program, it was unique among the programs the Air Corps offered to Allied nations inasmuch as the British dealt directly with the contractors and completely controlled all aspects of the flying training process. Basically, the Air Corps just helped the RAF and the contractors select the sites for the schools and then supervised their construction. The schools were located at Mesa, Arizona; Lancaster, California; Clewiston, Florida; Miami and Ponca City, Oklahoma; Terrell, Texas; and, briefly, Sweetwater, Texas.

The United States also assisted the Chinese Air Force. The Air Corps conducted most of the training for the Chinese at three Arizona installations: Luke, Williams, and Thunderbird Fields. Training the Chinese presented some special challenges. Because of their small stature some students could not reach all the controls. That problem was usually solved through the use of extra cushions and occasionally by switching them to another type of airplane. A bigger problem was the language barrier. It took all the interpreters the Air Corps could muster to support the training programs for the Chinese. In the end, 3,553 Chinese received flying and technical training, including 866 pilots.

While the preponderance of students trained in the United States during World War II were British, French, or Chinese, over 20 other nations also sent students. Most came from Latin America, most notably Brazil and Mexico. A smattering of others came from Australia, Turkey, the Netherlands, and the Soviet Union.

=== Technical Training ===
==== Origins ====
During World War I, the school at Kelly Field had trained over 2,000 more mechanics. Though the school in St Paul closed after the end of the war, Kelly remained in operation and trained some 5,000 more mechanics before January 1921. When the supply depot at Love Field, Dallas, closed in 1921 and moved to Kelly, the Air Service mechanics's school was forced to move to Chanute Field, Illinois. In 1922, the school was expanded when the photography school at Langley Field, Virginia, and the communications school at Fort Sill, Oklahoma, both joined the mechanics course at Chanute, congregating all technical training in the Air Service at that location. The facility at Chanute was re-designated as the Air Corps Technical School in 1926, with the former separate schools becoming "Departments".

In 1930, two more Departments were established at Chanute, the Department of Clerical Instruction and the Department of Armament. Technical training expanded in 1938 at Lowry Field, Colorado, when the Photography, Armament and Clerical instruction were moved from Chanute to the new facilities in Denver. In 1939, Scott Field, Illinois, came under the Air Corps Technical School when the Department of Basic Instruction, responsible for the basic training of all new recruits, was established at Scott. It moved to Chanute in 1940 when Scott became the Air Corps Radio school.

==== Technical Training Command ====
On 1 June 1939, the Air Corps Technical School at Chanute Field was elevated to the Command level, being re-designated as Air Corps Technical Training Command. With the expansion of the Air Corps after May 1940, technical training was expanded rapidly. By early November 1941, students were entering technical training at the rate of 110,000 per year, and after the Japanese attack on Pearl Harbor the student flow rose sharply: 13,000 men entered technical training schools in January 1942 and 55,000 in December 1942.

To accommodate this rapid growth in students, additional installations were established. New technical training bases included Keesler Field, Mississippi, and Sheppard Field, Texas, both activated in 1941 with a mission of technical training. Also, because technical schools did not require flying facilities, the Army Air Forces took over a total of 452 hotels, as well as warehouses, theaters, convention halls, athletic fields, parking lots, and various other structures to accommodate student classroom space. The number of hotels at the peak of training included 337 in Miami Beach, Florida; 62 in St. Petersburg, Florida; 46 in Atlantic City, New Jersey; three in Chicago, Illinois, and two in Grand Rapids, Michigan.

The heavy burden of the greatly expanded program for technical training had forced the Air Corps to establish the Air Corps Technical Training Command on 1 March 1941. Temporary headquarters for the new command was established at Chanute Field on 26 March; In September a permanent headquarters for the command was selected at Tulsa, Oklahoma. Further decentralization was achieved by grouping the technical schools into two districts. In a functional arrangement which placed basic military and aviation mechanic training under one command and remaining specialties under another, the first district included Scott Field, Lowry Field, and Fort Logan; the second district was composed of Chanute Field, Keesler Field, Sheppard Field, and Jefferson Barracks.

This organization was abandoned on 10 March 1942 when Air Corps Technical Training Command revised the two districts and announced that four technical training districts would be established on a geographical basis to manage the expansion. These were:

- 1st Technical Training District, Greensboro Center, North Carolina
- 2nd Technical Training District, St. Louis, Missouri
- 3rd Technical Training District, Tulsa, Oklahoma
- 4th Technical Training District, Denver, Colorado

Later, in November 1942, a 5th Training District with headquarters at Miami Beach, Florida, was created to supervise the numerous technical training activities in Florida.

On 31 July 1943, the Army Air Forces reorganized AAF Training Command with the establishment of subordinate commands, three for flying training and three for technical training. The five districts that had belonged to Technical Training Command were disbanded and realigned.

- First District at Greensboro became the Eastern Technical Training Command (ETTC)
- Second District in St Louis was renamed the Central Technical Training Command (CTTC)
- Fourth District in Denver was renamed the Western Technical Training Command (WTTC)

The Third District at Tulsa, Oklahoma was divided between WTTC and CTTC. The Fifth District in Miami Beach was absorbed into the ETTC.

Requirements in the combat theaters for graduates of technical training schools and even pilots proved to be smaller than initially expected, so the Army Air Forces reduced the size of these training programs in January 1944. the Central Technical Training Command in St. Louis was discontinued 1 March 1944. All schools previously in the central command, with the exception of Keesler Field, became part of the eastern command. Keesler went to the western command. Simultaneously, the headquarters of Eastern Technical Training Command moved from Greensboro, North Carolina, to St Louis.

==== Technical MOS Classifications ====
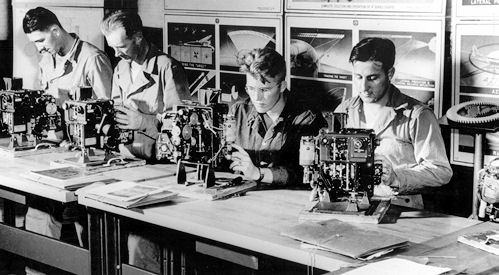
The bombsight was the key to successful missions. Here, Lowry Field students inspect and adjust Sperry bombsights.

- Aircraft Maintenance

Of the constellation of technical training courses offered to officers and enlisted men in 116 different schools (32 of them factory schools) at the end of 1944, many involved advanced training in aircraft maintenance. One of the most important of these was a power plant course designed to produce engine specialists. This covered maintenance of standard aircraft engines and their accessories, including superchargers, generators, starters, and carburetors.

- Armament Maintenance

Among other specialists trained in technical training schools were experts in armament maintenance. Combat aircraft were complex, including much lethal equipment, such as machine guns, cannons, bombs, and related gun turrets and bombsights. Such equipment exceeded the capabilities of general airplane mechanics and required the technical expertise of specialized armament maintainers.

- Communications and RADAR

As communications equipment became increasingly specialized, the AAF found it necessary to establish more and more courses of training in the operation and maintenance of radio and radar devices. In 1944 some men were being trained solely as radio mechanics, some as radio operators, and still others as radio operator-mechanics (ROM's). The radar training programs were marked by much more specialization. The term "radar," a word coined from "radio detection and ranging," was almost as new to the AAF as it was to the general .public.

- Aerial Photography

During the war great strides were made in the art of aerial photography, and this means of reconnaissance became indispensable to planning, executing, and appraising a wide variety of military operations. Having a large share of the responsibility for training personnel in this work, the AAF developed, in addition to aerial photographers, such specialists as camera repairmen, laboratory technicians, and cinematographers.

- Meteorology

Weather affects all flying, and its importance to military flying can be crucial. In order to get the weather information essential to its operations, the AAF maintained in the AAF Weather Service a world-wide chain of weather stations for observation and forecasting of atmospheric conditions. Routine observation and recording of weather data were performed by enlisted personnel of the lower grades, and the analysis of weather maps and the preparation of forecasts were made by commissioned officers and enlisted personnel of the higher grades.

- Services Specialties

Air Corps functions, such as those belonging to the Medical, Ordnance, and Finance Departments, the Signal, Engineer, Quartermaster, and Military Police Corps, and the Chemical Warfare Service. Most of the enlisted personnel of these branches were classified as nonspecialists and did not attend service schools. Appropriate training for specialists was provided partly by the AAF and partly by the particular branches concerned, but in keeping with the move toward integration of arms and services personnel, the AAF assumed increasing control over their training.

=== Army Air Forces Base Units ===
In April 1944 the Army Air Forces developed a new, temporary organization known as the Army Air Forces Base Unit (AAFBU), usually referred to as "AAF Base Units" to standardize unit designations assigned to bases, one for each base in the United States, with separate additional base units to provide personnel overhead for wings, regions, and higher echelons. All organizations on the base were designated as squadrons of the base unit, identified by letters from "A" to "Z". Personnel were reassigned to the new squadrons, and the previous squadron designations were inactivated.

To the basic numerical designation and the "AAFBU" designation, the new units could have a parenthetical suffix that indicated the unit's function. Because the base units could be designated, organized, and discontinued by the commands, air forces, and centers, they were in effect major command-controlled (or MAJCON) units, the first of their kind.

Despite some resistance, the experiment was destined to leave its mark on postwar organization of the United States Air Force. In September 1947, upon establishment of the U.S. Air Force, all AAF base units were re-designated as Air Force Base Units (AFBUs); but by mid-1948 the remaining base units were discontinued or re designated into a new type of four-digit T/D unit (Hobson Plan), the direct predecessor of the MAJCON system.

=== Postwar era ===
By the end of 1945, the primary functions of AAF Training Command had become the rapid separation of eligible personnel from the Army Air Forces and the recruiting of Regular Army enlistees to operate the post-war air forces. Consequently, in early September Training Command headquarters set up a demobilization unit in its Personnel (A-1) Division, and on 22 October it established a Recruiting Section. Its goal was to create an entirely voluntary force, preferably one consisting of experienced, three-year reenlistees.

==== Consolidations ====
As World War II approached its conclusion (effectively on 14 August but formally not until 2 September), training activities and the strength of Training Command declined. The end of the war in Europe in May caused the focus of training to shift from the needs of the European Theater to those of the Pacific, particularly courses associated with very heavy bombardment. Then, with the cessation of hostilities in the Pacific, most training ceased for those students not planning to remain in the post-war air forces. Before that time, however, the trend in training had gone increasingly toward specialized training on particular types of aircraft. Then during the last four months of 1945, rapid retrenchment in training occurred, and emphasis shifted to separating people from the Army Air Forces and reorganizing Training Command for its still undetermined peacetime goals.

By January 1945 basic military training had become a comparatively minor part of Training Command's activities. Only three centers remained active – Amarillo, Sheppard, and Keesler. Buckley Field stopped basic training in December 1944, but it was early 1945 before all trainees had assignments. Only about 19,000 soldiers were in basic training in January, as compared to the peak figure of 135,796 in February 1943.

==== Flying training reorganization ====
By mid-October 1945 Training Command reassigned all people and equipment in Western Flying Training Command to the jurisdiction of its central counterpart, which on 1 November 1945, became known as Western Flying Training Command. Then on 15 December the enlarged western command absorbed Eastern Flying Training Command. The single entity became Flying Training Command on 1 January 1946, with its headquarters at Randolph Field, Texas.

In June 1945 the San Antonio Aviation Cadet Center transferred to the Personnel Distribution Command. In preparation for that event, also in June, the Officer Candidate School transferred from the aviation cadet center to Maxwell Field, Alabama.

Many pilot training installations discontinued training in 1945. The last contract primary pilot schools ended their operations in October. By that time, only Goodfellow Field, Texas, and Tuskegee Field, Alabama, continued to offer primary pilot training. The last class of black pilots graduated from primary training at Tuskegee on 20 November. Goodfellow's last primary class transferred to Randolph Field to finish training. Randolph began primary training on 26 December.

By the end of 1945, only Perrin Field, Texas, and Tuskegee Field continued to provide basic pilot training. The remaining active advanced single-engine schools were at Luke Field, Arizona; Stewart Field, New York; and Tuskegee. Advanced twin-engine training continued only at Enid Field, Oklahoma; Turner Field, Georgia; and Tuskegee. The 28th, 29th, 31st, 35th, 36th, 74th, 78th, 79th, 81st, and 83d Flying Training Wings were also inactivated.

==== Establishment of Air Training Command ====
On 1 July 1946, AAF Training Command was redesignated as Air Training Command.

On 27 September 1947, Air Training Command became a major command of the United States Air Force. On 1 July 1993, it was consolidated with Air University and became today's AETC, celebrating its 75th year of continuous service 23 January 2017. See: https://www.aetc.af.mil/News/Article-Display/Article/1055698/aetcs-75th-anniversary-and-the-birth-of-a-professional-air-force/

== Lineage ==
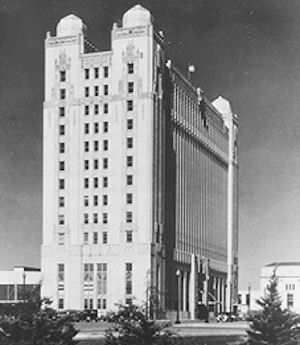
From 1943 to 1946, AAF Training Command was headquartered in Fort Worth, Texas. The command initially occupied the top four floors of the Texas and Pacific Railway office building.

- Constituted and established as: Air Corps Flying Training Command, 23 January 1942

Re-designated as: Army Air Forces Flying Training Command, abt 15 March 1942

- Constituted and established as: Air Corps Technical Training Command, 23 January 1942

Re-designated as: Army Air Forces Technical Training Command, abt 15 March 1942

- Re-designated as Army Air Forces Training Command on 1 July 1943

Re-designated as Air Training Command on 1 July 1946
Redesignated as Air Education and Training Command 1 July 1993

== Assignments ==
- Chief of Air Corps, 23 January 1942
- Headquarters, Army Air Forces, 7 July 1943 – 1 July 1946

== Stations ==
- Washington, D.C., 23 January 1942
- Fort Worth, Texas, 1 July 1942
- Barksdale Field, Louisiana, 25 February – 1 July 1946
- Scott AFB, Illinois, 17 October 1949
- Randolph AFB, Texas, 15 September 1957

== Sub-Commands ==
=== Flying Training ===
see the individual wing for a list of schools and bases assigned

Eastern Flying Training Command (EFTC)

Established as: Southeast Air Corps Training Center, 8 July 1940
Re-designated: Eastern Flying Training Command, 31 July 1943 – 15 December 1945

Headquarters: Maxwell Field, Alabama, 8 July 1940 – 15 December 1945

- 27th Flying Training Wing (U.S. Army Air Forces) Basic Flight Training

Headquarters:

Cochran Army Airfield, Georgia, 17 December 1942 – 15 December 1945
Randolph Field, Texas, 16 December 1945 – 16 June 1946

- 28th Flying Training Wing (U.S. Army Air Forces) Advanced Flight Training, Single-Engine

Headquarters:

George Army Airfield, Illinois, 26 December 1942
Craig Field, Alabama, 15 August 1943 – 30 December 1945

- 29th Flying Training Wing (U.S. Army Air Forces) Primary Flight Training

Headquarters:

Moody Field, Georgia, 26 December 1942
Napier Field, Alabama, 1 April 1945 – 16 June 1946

- 30th Flying Training Wing (U.S. Army Air Forces) Advanced Flight Training, Two Engine

Headquarters:

Jackson Army Airbase, Mississippi, 26 December 1942
Columbus Army Airfield, Mississippi, 15 September 1943
Turner Army Airfield, Georgia, 13 September 1944
Randolph Field, Texas, 31 July – 13 October 1946.

- 74th Flying Training Wing (U.S. Army Air Forces) Classification/Preflight/Specialized/Navigation

Headquarters:

Maxwell Field, Alabama, 16 September 1943 – 30 December 1945

- 75th Flying Training Wing (U.S. Army Air Forces) Gunnery

Headquarters:

Buckingham Army Airfield, Florida, 25 August 1943 – 16 June 1946

- 76th Flying Training Wing (U.S. Army Air Forces) Specialized Four-Engine Training

Headquarters:

Smyrna Army Airfield, Tennessee, 25 August 1943 – 16 June 1946

Central Flying Training Command (CFTC)

Established as: Gulf Coast Air Corps Training Center, 8 July 1940
Re-designated: Central Flying Training Command, 31 July 1943
Re-designated: Western Flying Training Command, 15 December 1945
Re-designated: Army Air Forces Flying Training Command, 1 January – 1 July 1946

Headquarters: Randolph Field (later Randolph Air Force Base), Texas, 1 January 1931 – 14 November 1949

- 31st Flying Training Wing (Primary)

Headquarters:

Enid Army Airfield, Oklahoma, 16 January 1943
Fort Worth Army Airfield, Texas, 31 May – 30 December 1945

- 32d Flying Training Wing (Basic)

Headquarters:

Perrin Field, Texas, 16 January 1943
Randolph Field, Texas, 31 October 1945 – 13 October 1946

- 33d Flying Training Wing (Advanced, Two Engine)

Headquarters:

Blackland Army Airfield, Texas, 16 January 1943
Waco Army Airfield, Texas, 8 Jul 1944
Randolph Field, Texas, 31 October 1945 – 13 October 1946

- 34th Flying Training Wing (Bombardier and Specialized Two/Four-Engine)

Headquarters:

San Angelo Army Airfield, Texas, 8 January 1943
Midland Army Airfield, Texas, 25 May 1945 – 16 June 1946

- 77th Flying Training Wing (Advanced, Single Engine)

Headquarters:

Foster Army Airfield, Texas, 25 August 1943
Bryan Army Air Base, Texas, 26 March 1945 – 16 June 1946

- 78th Flying Training Wing (Classification/Preflight)

Headquarters:

San Antonio Aviation Cadet Center, Texas, 25 August 1943 – 30 June 1945

- 79th Flying Training Wing (Gunnery)

Headquarters:

Harlingen Army Airfield, Texas, 25 August 1943
Maxwell Field, Alabama, 15 October – 30 December 1945.

- 80th Flying Training Wing (Navigation and Glider)

Headquarters:

San Marcos Army Airfield, Texas, 25 August 1943
Ellington Field, Texas, 1 January 1945 – 16 June 1946

Western Flying Training Command (WFTC)

Established as: West Coast Air Corps Training Center, 8 July 1940
Re-designated: Western Flying Training Command, 31 July 1943 – 1 November 1945

Headquarters: Santa Ana Army Air Base, California, 1 April 1942 – 1 November 1945

- 35th Flying Training Wing Basic/Advanced Flight Training (California)

Headquarters:

Merced Army Airfield, California, 8 January 1943
Minter Field, California, 11 September 1943 – 16 June 1946

- 36th Flying Training Wing Primary Flight Training

Headquarters:

Victorville Army Airfield, California, 8 January 1943
Santa Ana Army Air Base, California, 21 December 1943 – 1 November 1945

- 37th Flying Training Wing Basic/Advanced Flight Training (Arizona)

Headquarters:

Luke Field, Arizona, 8 January 1943 – 16 June 1946

- 38th Flying Training Wing Bombardier and Specialized 2/4-Engine Training

Headquarters:

Roswell Army Airfield, New Mexico, 8 January 1943
Kirtland Field, New Mexico, 10 September 1943
Williams Field, Arizona, 26 February 1945 – 16 June 1946

Headquarters:

Santa Ana Army Air Base, California, 25 August 1943
1104 W. 8th St., Santa Ana, California, 15 December 1944 – 1 November 1945

- 83d Flying Training Wing

Headquarters:

Douglas Army Airfield, Arizona, 25 August 1943 – 20 December 1943
(No units ever assigned)

=== Technical Training ===
see the individual wing for a list of schools and bases assigned

AAF Eastern Technical Training Command (AAFETTC)

Established as: 1st District, AAF Technical Training Command, 10 March 1942
Re-designated: AAF Eastern Technical Training Command, 31 August 1943
Re-designated: Technical Training Command, 15 October 1945 – 1 July 1946

Headquarters:

Greensboro, North Carolina, 10 March 1942
St. Louis, Missouri, 1 March 1944
Scott Field, Illinois, 15 October 1945 – 14 November 1949

AAF Central Technical Training Command (AAFCTTC)

Established as: 2nd District, AAF Technical Training Command, 10 March 1942
Re-designated: AAF Central Technical Training Command, 31 August 1943 – 1 March 1944

Headquarters:

St. Louis, Missouri, 10 March 1942 – 1 March 1944

AAF Western Technical Training Command (AAFWTTC)

Established as: 4th District, AAF Technical Training Command, 10 March 1942
Re-designated: AAF Western Technical Training Command, 31 August 1943 – 15 October 1945

Headquarters:

Denver, Colorado, 24 March 1942 – 15 October 1945

Notes: The 3rd District, AAF Technical Training Command at Tulsa, Oklahoma (10 March 1942 – 31 August 1943) was divided between AAFWTTC and AAFCTTC. The 5th District at the Miami Beach Training Center, Florida (20 November 1942 – 31 August 1943) was absorbed into the AAFETTC.

== See also ==
- Operational - Replacement Training Units
- I Troop Carrier Command (conducted troop carrier training, coordinated with AAFTC)
