= Logan School =

Logan School may refer to:

- Logan School for Creative Learning, Denver, Colorado
- Logan School (Columbia, South Carolina), listed on the U.S. National Register of Historic Places
