= Chapel No. 1 =

Historic chapel in Denver, Colorado, US

- U.S. National Register of Historic Places
- Colorado State Register of Historic Properties
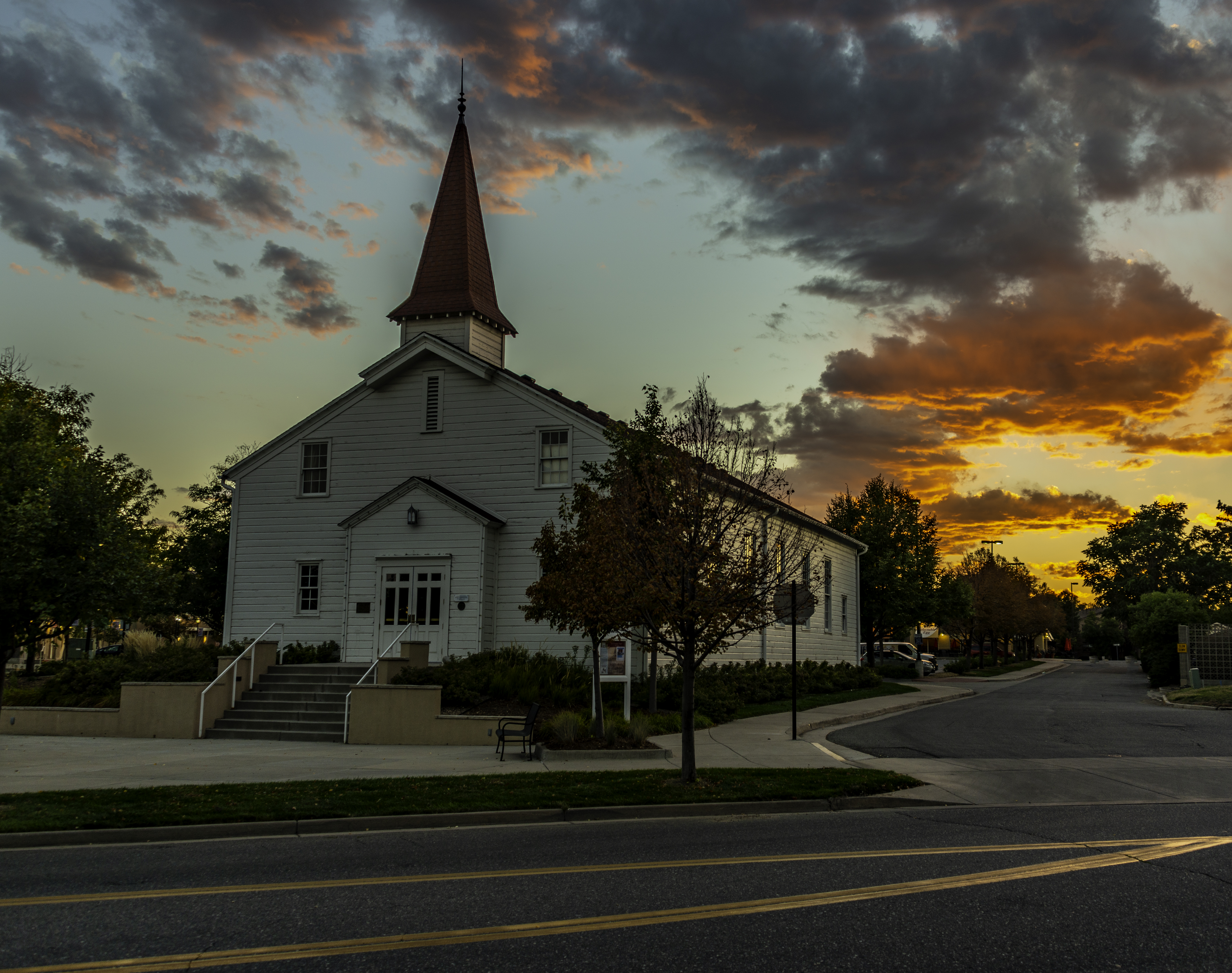
- Side view of the chapel

- Location within Colorado Location within the United States
- Location: Reeves St. on Lowry Air Force Base, Denver, Colorado
- Coordinates: 39°43′16″N 104°54′4″W
- Built: 1941
- Architect: United States Army
- NRHP reference No.: 82002292
- CSRHP No.: 5DV.193
- Added to NRHP: May 6, 1982

Chapel No. 1 or Eisenhower Memorial Chapel is a historic chapel located at the former Lowry Air Force Base in Denver, Colorado, United States. Built in 1941, it was listed on the National Register of Historic Places in 1982.
