= Lowry Air Force Base =

Former US Air Force base in Denver, Colorado

- Part of Air Training Command (ATC)
- Located in Aurora and Denver, Colorado
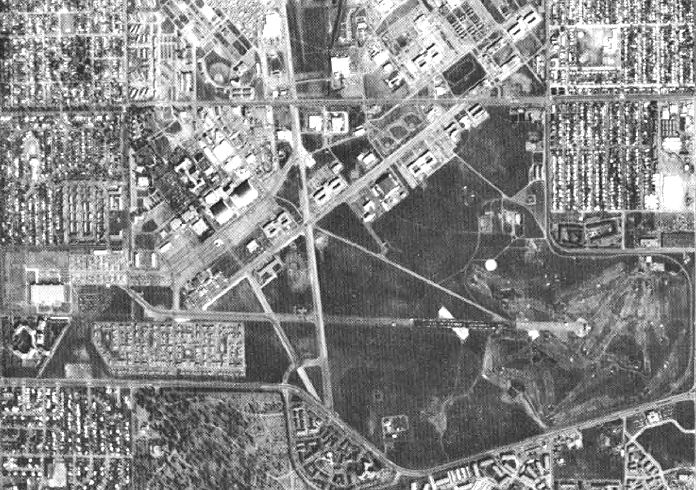
- Lowry Air Force Base and nearby residential areas in March 1987

Site information
- Type: USAF base
- Code: GNIS: 2089348; FFID: CO857002413000 USAF: 08007F
- Owner: City & County of Denver
- Controlled by: United States Air Force
- Condition: Denver neighborhood

Location
- Coordinates: 39°43′23″N 104°53′31″W

Site history
- Built: 1937–1941
- In use: 12 Dec 1938 – 30 Sep 1994 (base); 1938–1966 (airfield)
- Demolished: numerous buildings

Garrison information
- Garrison: Lowry Technical Training Center

Lowry Air Force Base (Lowry Field from 1938 to 1948) is a former United States Army Air Forces (USAAF) training base during World War II and a United States Air Force (USAF) training base during the Cold War. From 1955 to 1958, it served as the initial site of the U.S. Air Force Academy. It is a U.S. Formerly Used Defense Site (B08CO0505).

Lowry AFB shown with 2 Titan I launch complexes and missile plant PJKS

== Background ==
The City of Denver, Auraria, and Highland was chartered as the 1859 territorial capital after the start of the 1858 Pike's Peak gold rush. In 1887, Fort Logan was established in the modern Denver Metropolitan Area. East of the state capital, military training at Montclair, Colorado, began at the future airfield when the 1887 Jarvis Hall Military School opened. Montclair was incorporated into Denver in 1903 and Jarvis Hall burned down in 1904. At the military school site the Agnes Phipps Memorial Sanatorium was established as a tuberculosis hospital in 1904 at 520 Rampart Way (cf. "East 6th Avenue and Quebec Street") by Lawrence C. Phipps Sr., and in the 1930s the sanatorium included 17 buildings designed by the Gove and Walsh firm.

"After several fires at Chanute Field and deterioration of the buildings" in Illinois, a 1934 Air Corps announcement solicited a replacement training location and Denver submitted a bid. The City of Denver purchased the sanatorium for an airfield after a 1935 municipal bond vote. On 27 August 1937, the Denver Branch, Air Corps Technical School, was formed with Departments of Photography and Armament ("photography training moved from Chanute Field"), and the WPA converted the sanatorium grounds into a Colorado military airfield. In February 1938 the airfield being installed adjacent to Fairmont Cemetery was assigned to the Air Corps Technical School headquartered at Chanute, and "the Denver branch of the Army Air Corps became an Army post of 880 acres."

== Original Lowry Field ==
The name Lowry Field was originally assigned to an airfield consisting of property taken over by the Colorado National Guard, having a southern border along East 38th Avenue between Dahlia & Holly Streets. It was named for Second Lieutenant Francis Lowry, the only Colorado pilot killed in combat in World War I. The airfield was used by the 120th Observation Squadron, 45th Division Aviation. In 1924, the 120th began flying Curtiss JN-4Es (better known as Jennies) at the new airfield.

A 28 October 1926 photo shows the Fokker BA-1 trimotor Josephine Ford of the Byrd Arctic Expedition being refueled at the original Lowry Field. Charles Lindbergh and his Spirit of St. Louis made a scheduled stop at Lowry on 1 September 1927 during his 48 state sponsored tour. Jack Taylor died on the maiden voyage of the Cheyenne-Pueblo-Denver contract airmail route from Lowry to Cheyenne when his aircraft exploded on 10 December 1927. He was flying a large Douglas mail plane for Western Air Express Inc. near Lowry.

During the latter part of 1937 the name "Lowry Field" was transferred from the Colorado National Guard facility to the new Denver Branch, Air Corps Technical School. In early 1938, after about a year of overlapping operations, the 120th Observation Squadron moved to their new quarters at the Denver Municipal Airport; remaining there until mobilization for World War II took place on 6 January 1941. The 19 officers and 116 enlisted members of the squadron then moved to Biggs Army Airfield, Texas.

In 1938, the former Lowry Field was renamed Combs Field when Harry B. Combs began leasing the airfield. He and a partner opened Mountain State Aviation, a fixed-base operation and flight training facility. Mountain State would go on to train over 9,000 pilots for World War II through the Civilian Pilot Training Program at the location. In 1936, Combs had joined the 120th Observation Squadron, flying the 0-19 E variant and gaining enough flying time to earn his instructor’s rating.

== Lowry Field ==
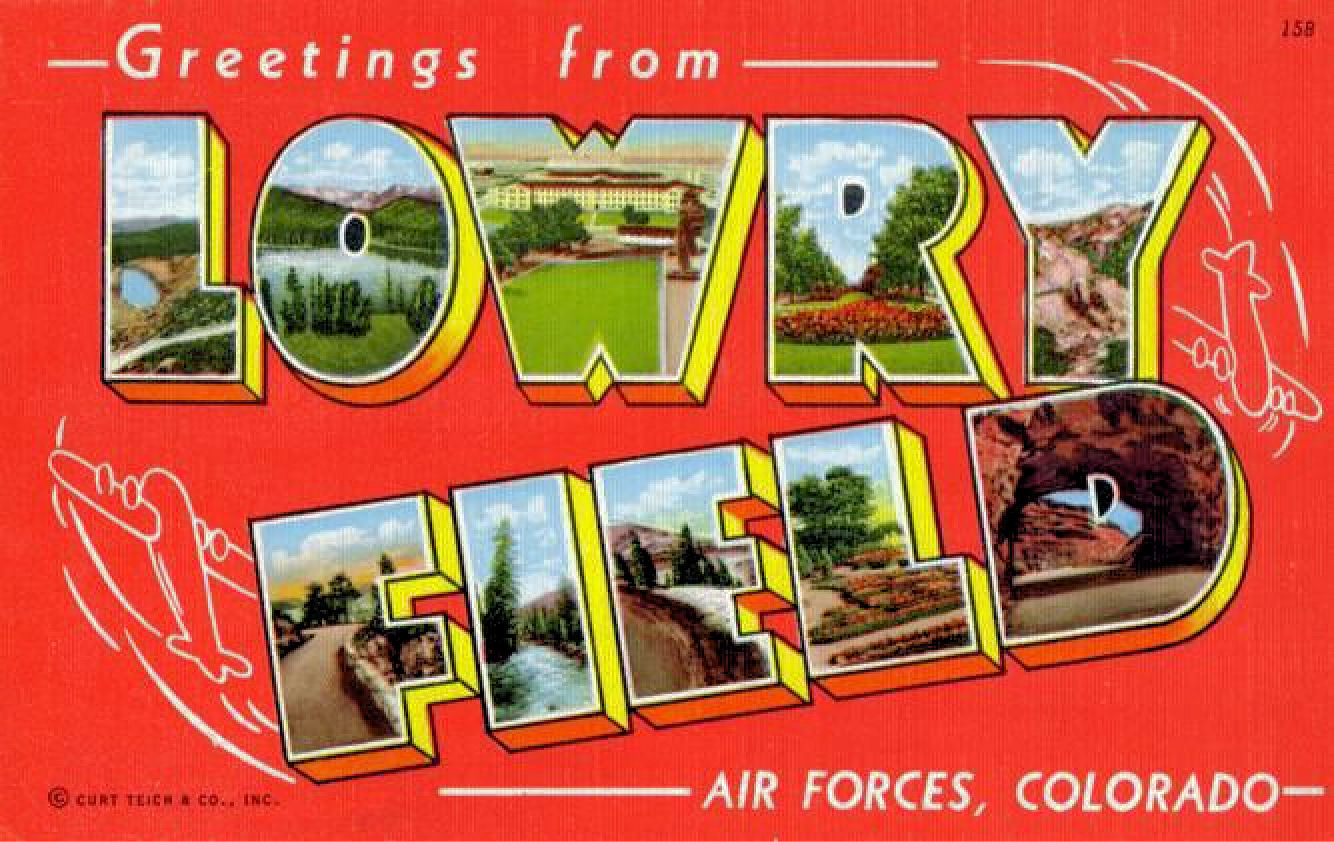
World War II Postcard of Lowry Field

Lowry Field was assigned to the new Army Air Field on 11 March 1938. Photographic courses began prior to the field's completion and runway paving. The paved runway opened on 4 April (first used by a B-18 Bolo). The sanatorium's main building became the Army post's headquarters, and the largest single barracks (3,200 men) was completed in mid-1940. The "Northeast-Southwest runway was completed in 1941" and on 1 March 1941, the Air Corps Technical School moved an "A.A.F. Clerical School" for Air Corps Clerks (384 hours) to Fort Logan from Lowry. Beginning 16 July 1940, the 1st class of the AAF bombardier schools was at Lowry and used the nearby bombing and gunnery range through 14 March 1941, graduating three classes of instructors who opened the Barksdale Field bombardier school.

== Fourth Technical Training District ==
Lowry training for Boeing B-29 Superfortress pilot qualification and for B-29 operational crew readiness began in 1943, and the base had a July 1943–Jan 1944 clerical school. In 1944 expansion of Lowry's airfield was planned and Lowry gained B-29 Flight Engineer training.

Lowry transferred under Technical Training Command in mid-October 1945 (Air Training Command on 1 July 1946) and by the end of 1945, Lowry's separation center was processing an average of 300 discharges a day. The nearby bombing range was transferred from Buckley Field, by authority of Technical Division, Air Training Command, to Lowry A.F.B. on 20 September 1946. In July 1947, formal courses in Intelligence Training were established at Lowry for combat reporting, photographic intelligence, prisoner of war interrogation, and briefing and interrogation of combat crews.

== USAF base ==
Lowry Air Force Base was designated on 24 June 1948 and on 26 August 1948 established all Lowry training organizations under the 3415th Technical Training Wing (redesignated "Lowry Technical Training Center" on 1 Jan 1959). Lowry provided Operation Hayride emergency response for people and livestock threatened by eighteen December 1948 – January 1949 snowstorms from Utah to Kansas (e.g., a C-47 of the 2151st Air Rescue Unit delivered 115 blankets and 30 cases of C rations on 4 January to 482 people at Rockport, Colorado.) By 25 August 1949, the 3903rd Radar Bomb Scoring Squadron had a unit based at Lowry which operated a Strategic Air Command radar station (Lowry's radar annex was at Genesee Mountain Park.)

In 1951, plans called for the headquarters of Technical Training Air Force to be at Lowry and after expansion at the beginning of the Korean War, Lowry courses included photography, armament, rocket propulsion, electronics, radar-operated fire-control systems, computer specialties, gun and rocket sights, and electronically operated turret systems. The 3415th Wing formed a Guided Missiles Department on 7 June 1951 and from 1952 to 1955, Lowry functioned as President Dwight D. Eisenhower's Summer White House. Beginning in September 1954, the 3415th TTW moved intelligence, comptroller, and transportation training programs to Sheppard AFB. On 11 July 1955, the first class of 306 USAF Academy cadets was sworn in at Lowry.

In 1956 Lowry's bombing range support ended when the bombing range mission was terminated and Lowry's first general courses for missiles were developed. Courses were for Falcon, Rascal, Snark, and Navajo missiles and in 1958, Nuclear Weapons Training. Also early in 1958, the USAF concluded that the new NORAD headquarters (different from the planned Cheyenne Mountain nuclear bunkers for NORAD and the Denver ADS) should be relocated from Ent AFB to Lowry AFB (CO Springs' Chidlaw Building became the new NORAD HQ). In 1960, Lowry was the 3rd ranked technical training base of ATC.

== ICBM headquarters and training ==
The Air Force Ballistic Committee, formed in 1955, approved the former bombing range on 13 March 1958 for the first Titan I ICBM launch complex (the Titan missile plant was built at Waterton Canyon.) The 703d Strategic Missile Wing was activated on 25 September 1958 and redesignated the 451 SMW on 1 July 1961, at the same time the 848th and the 849 SMS were redesignated the 724th and 725 SMS. Construction on all nine silos at the three launch complexes for the 724 was completed by 4 August 1961. On 18 April 1962, Headquarters SAC declared the 724th SMS operational, and 2 days later the first Titan Is went on alert status. A month later, the sister 725th SMS (initially designated the 849th SMS) declared it had placed all nine of its Titan Is on alert status, which marked a SAC first. Both the 724th and 725th Strategic Missile Squadrons formed components of the Lowry-headquartered 451st Strategic Missile Wing. The "original class of instructors" for the Mace missile course at Lowry graduated from the "G.L. Martin factory training course in Baltimore MD in 1960" and by early 1961, Lowry's personnel course moved to Greenville AFB.

By 1962, Lowry's Department of Missile Training was graduating over 1,000 trained missile specialists per year, and the "Tactical Missile School at Lowry" (e.g., for Matador missile training) in January 1962 "was located in the Black Hangar". On 25 June 1965, the 724th and 725th Strategic Missile Squadrons were inactivated, and the last missile supported by Lowry was removed on 14 April 1965.

== Air Intelligence Training Center ==
The Armed Forces Air Intelligence Training Center was established at Lowry effective 1 July 1963 with student training beginning on 17 July (by 14 March, "the Defense Department had assigned responsibility for all DOD air intelligence training and advanced training in photographic, radar, and infrared interpretation to the Air Force.") In 1965, the runway was closed, and all Lowry AFB flying activities moved to nearby Buckley Air National Guard Base. Ten courses from Amarillo AFB were planned to be moved to Lowry in mid-1968, and Amarillo's 3320th Retraining Group for convicted airmen moved to Lowry 1 July – 1 September 1967. In 1974, the Air Staff approved Lackland AFB's Special Treatment Center to transfer to the 3415th Special Training Group at Lowry AFB. In addition to Air Force personnel, the U.S. Navy also sent junior officers (ensigns and lieutenants) for initial intelligence training at Lowry, along with enlisted personnel newly graduated from boot camp for their "A" school instruction as intelligence specialists.

Construction began in 1970 for enlisted and officer billeting facilities to replace World War II vintage barracks, five 1,000-man dormitories and completed by 1974, a 187-space mobile home park. Other added facilities included a youth center, a child-care center, a chapel (in addition to the 1941 chapel), and a new Airmen's Open Mess. In 1976, the Defense Finance and Accounting Service (formerly Air Force Accounting & Finance Center) & the Air Reserve Personnel Center opened in the Gilchrist Building (Building 444).

The AFAITC school remained at Lowry from 1963 to 1988, before moving to Goodfellow AFB, in San Angelo, Texas. US Navy intelligence training for both junior officers and enlisted personnel was shifted to the new Navy Marine Corps Intelligence Training Center (NMITC) at Dam Neck, in Virginia Beach, Virginia.

== USAF School of Applied Aerospace Sciences, Lowry ==
In 1972, the 3415th Technical Wing became the USAF School of Applied Aerospace Sciences, Lowry. The Department of Aerospace Munitions Training continued missile training and in 1978 was redesignated the 3460th Training Group. In 1980 Lowry acquired a Davis-Monthan AFB B-52D and stabilized another B-52 for training ALCM and SRAM loading procedures. New courses in the 1970s and 1980s included flight line and in-shop avionics maintenance courses for the F-4 Phantom II, F-111 Aardvark, A-10 Warthog, F-15 Eagle and F-16 Fighting Falcon (e.g., communications, flight controls, navigation, weapons guidance, and electronic countermeasures & warfare systems). In 1982, Lowry's 1941 Eisenhower Memorial Chapel (cf. the Eisenhower Chapel at Fort Knox) was listed in the National Register of Historic Places. The National Geospatial Agency's Integrated Operations Center was in Denver and by 1983, Lowry had the Air Intelligence Officer Course

LGM-118 Peacekeeper ICBM training began at Lowry in 1985, and after Lowry became the primary training center for USAF space operations, Undergraduate Space Training's 1st graduation was in 1987. The 3301st Undergraduate Space Training unit moved to Vandenberg AFB, CA in 1991, prior to Lowry AFB closure. Lowry also handled ground & armament training for several interceptor models, the A-10 Thunderbolt II, and the B-1 Lancer.

After being considered for closure in 1978 and since "Lowry lacked a runway" (all runways closed and all USAF flight operations terminated, July 1966), Lowry AFB was designated for closure by BRAC 1991. The 3400th Technical Training Wing inactivated on 27 April 1994, and the base officially closed on 30 September 1994. The National Civilian Community Corps used Lowry facilities from 1994 until 2004; and Space Systems Support Group Detachment 1 "located at the former Lowry AFB" in March 1995 moved to Peterson AFB. The Bonfils Blood Center "became the first commercial tenant at Lowry" in the former commissary during September 1995, and the site development company was presented facility and real estate awards in 1997 (asbestos was remediated from the Formerly Used Defense Site of "1,866 acres"—remediation at buildings included Building 402:PCBs, 606: groundwater, & 1432: soil).

== Closure ==
The Buckley Annex was the remaining military installation after the "Whole Base Transfer" of Lowry AFB in 2006, the year the USGS listed the closed Lowry AFB in the Geographic Names Information System. In 2007, the annex of 70 acres (28 ha) with DFAS & ARPC was planned for closure. The last remaining Air Force facility at Lowry was the Air Reserve Personnel Center, which BRAC 2005 moved to Buckley AFB in August 2011. The Buckley Annex' Whole Base Transfer was in 2012, and the "final stages of cleanup" of the base and annex were underway in February 2013.

Most of the base is now the Lowry, Denver, neighborhood with 2 hangars used for the Wings Over the Rockies Air and Space Museum, the former Building 1499 for the Big Bear Ice Rink, a dormitory for the Logan School for Creative Learning, and base officer housing and other facilities for the Stanley British Primary School. A dormitory and a former medical building on the east end of the base are owned by the state as part of the Higher Education and Technology campus. The last remaining military facility at the former Lowry base was the Defense Finance and Accounting Service Finance Center (6760 E Irvington Place), which had its own USAF Base Facility identifier in 2004 (08002D). The Lowry Community Master Association (LCMA) is located at 7581 E Academy Blvd, the former hangar with the name "Lowry Air Force Base" and which also has suites for Martifer Solar USA, Mor Beverage Corp, Montessori Casa International, and Extra Space Storage. Bishop Machebeuf Catholic high school is located in the Lowry neighborhood.

== Assignments and major units ==
- Air Corps Technical School, 27 Aug 1937
- Air Corps Technical Training Command, 26 March 1941 (AAF Technical Training Command on 15 March 1942)
- AAF Training Command, 31 July 1943 (Air Training Command on 1 July 1946)
- Air Educational and Training Command, 1 June 1992 – 27 April 1994

Major units

- Denver Branch, February 1938
- 3415th Technical Training Wing, 26 August 1948–

redesignated 3415th Technical School, USAF
Lowry Technical Training Center, 1 January 1959
USAF School of Applied Aerospace Sciences, Lowry, 1 August 1972 – 1 April 1977

- 380th Bombardment Group (Heavy) March–April 1943 (B-24s)
- 389th Bombardment Group, 19 April – 1 June 1943
- 446th Bombardment Group, 8 June – 19 October 1943
- 331st Twin Engine Fighter Training Group, 24 October 1943 – 1 January 1944
- 322d Troop Carrier Wing, 12 Jun 1947 – 27 June 1949
- USAF Technical Gunnery School, 12 October 1950 – 1 January 1960
- USAF Academy, 14 August 1954 – 19 July 1959
- 703d Strategic Missile Wing, 25 September 1958 – 1 July 1961

Redesignated 451st Strategic Missile Wing, 1 July 1961 – 25 June 1965

- USAF Intelligence Training Center, 1 July 1963 – 27 April 1994
- 3400th Technical Training Wing, 1 April 1977 – 1 January 1978; 1 November 1979 – 27 April 1994

== See also ==
External image
- Carillon & hq structures
- Missiles on Lowry

- Western Technical Training Command
