= Fort Logan =

Former fort in Colorado, U.S.

Coordinates: 39.644°N 105.044°W

- Denver, Colorado
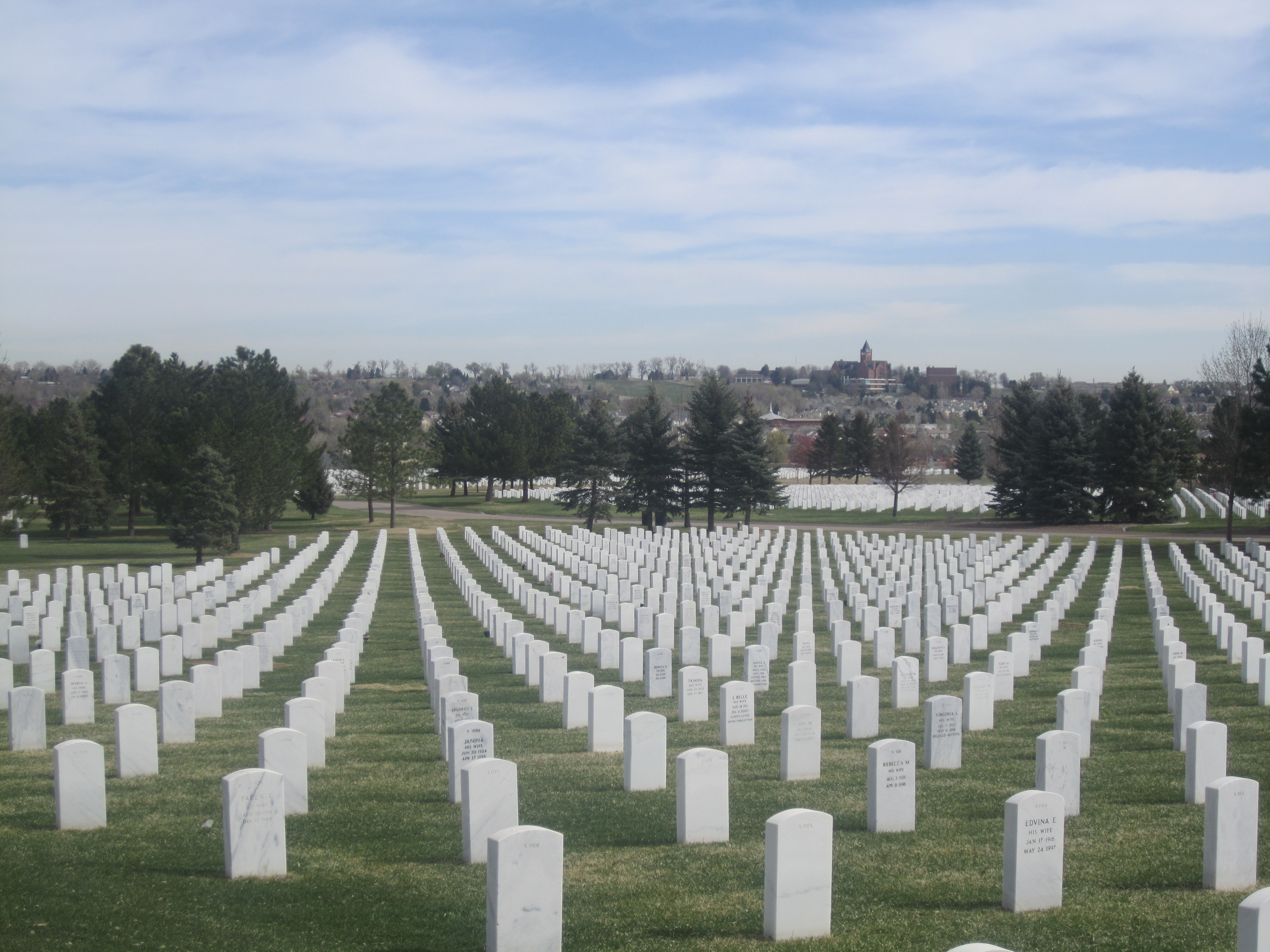
- Graves at Fort Logan National Cemetery on the site of the old Fort Logan burial grounds.

Site information
- Type: Fort

Site history
- Built: 31 October 1887
- Built by: United States Army
- In use: 1887 – 1946
- Fate: 75 Acres became Fort Logan National Cemetery, much of the remainder given to Colorado Mental Health Institute

Fort Logan was a military installation located eight miles southwest of Denver, Colorado. It was established in October 1887, when the first soldiers camped on the land, and lasted until 1946, when it was closed following the end of World War II. After the fort closed the site was used as a mental health center and part of the land was set aside for the Fort Logan National Cemetery.

Initially named Fort Sheridan, in 1889 the fort was named after Union General John A. Logan, commander of US Volunteer forces during the American Civil War.

== History ==
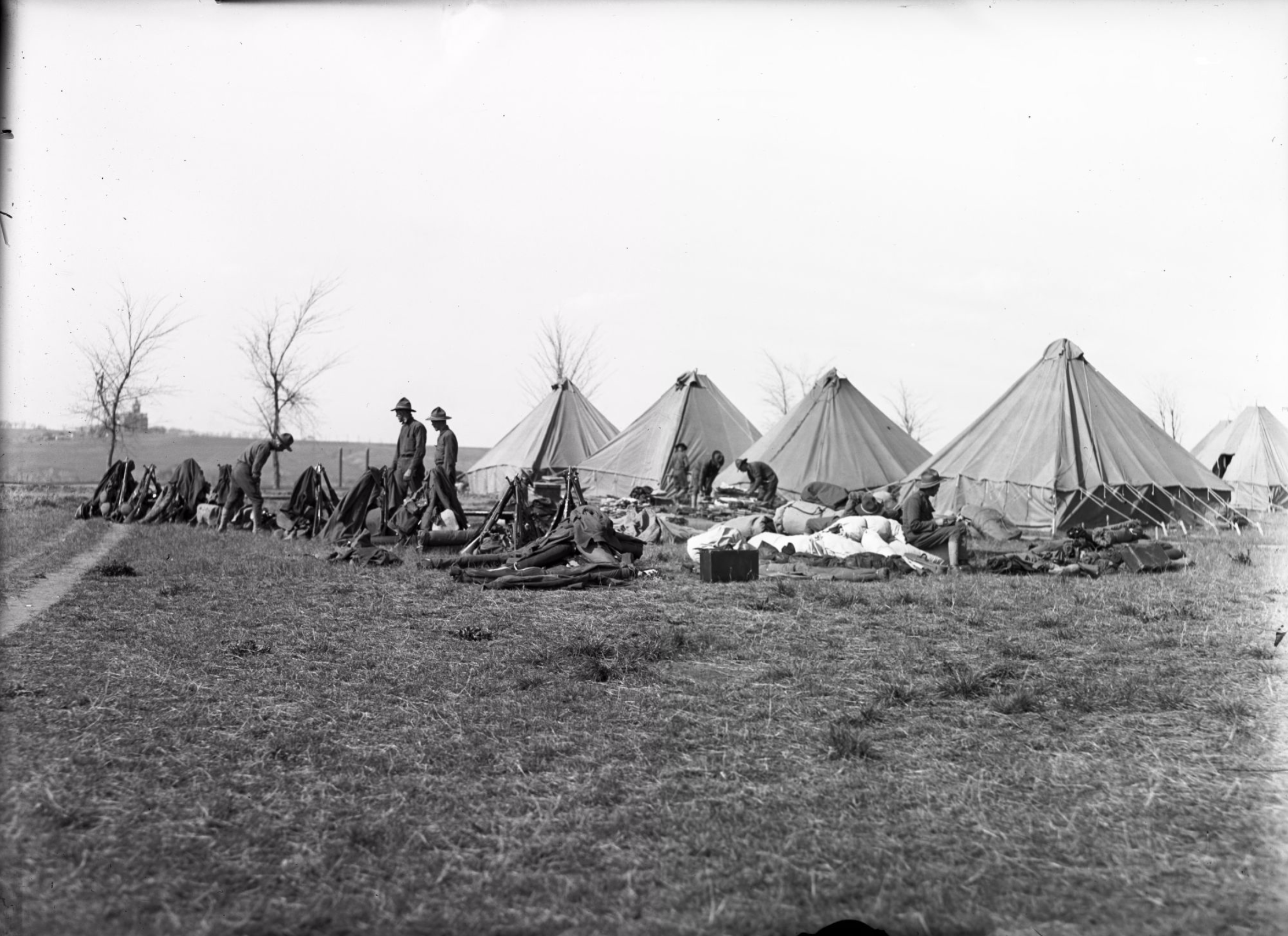
Troops encamped at Fort Logan, Colorado, 1917 or 1918, with Loretto Heights in the background

Toward the end of the 19th century, conflicts between Native Americans and expanding American interests were becoming less common. The United States Army began looking to cut costs by closing isolated frontier forts and start using the railroads to transport troops and supplies.

Denver citizens were concerned about their safety due to the influx of settlers from the east. They petitioned the United States Army to build a post. Colorado Senator Henry M. Teller introduced a bill in Congress 1886 for construction of a post, which was signed in February 1887. The fort, originally known as "the camp near the city of Denver" first housed members of the 18th Infantry from Leavenworth, Kansas and Fort Hays, who arrived in October 1887. They established a temporary barracks and guardhouse while permanent buildings were constructed. Initially, the post responded to local civil and labor disputes.

The camp was a treeless plateau located about eight miles southwest of the city. Unofficially the local citizens began to refer to it as "Fort Sheridan" after General Philip Sheridan who had selected the site. Sheridan preferred having his name associated with a fort north of Chicago and on 5 April 1889, had the camp designated "Fort Logan" after John Alexander Logan, who led Union Army volunteer forces during the Civil War. Logan was the head of the post-war organization Grand Army of the Republic and issued General Orders No. 11, establishing May 30 as "Decoration Day", now called Memorial Day, to honor the Civil War dead. In 1889, the town of Fort Logan was established that included the base and surrounding land.

A three-acre cemetery was established in 1889. The first recorded burial was for Mable Peterkin, daughter of Private Peterkin, who died on June 28, 1889.

This new "urban-type" fort began construction quickly, though the final buildings were not completed until 1897. The fort had a parade ground and quarters, including the 1888 building for Field Officer's Quarters by Frank J. Godavent which still stands today and was restored in 2009. As infantry barracks were completed, the 7th Infantry left Fort Laramie, Wyoming, and made Fort Logan their permanent home. In 1894, the first cavalry units were posted to Fort Logan and remained until 1904.

Troops from Fort Logan participated in military actions right from the start. In December 1890, troops were deployed to South Dakota to intercept Sioux tribal bands. In 1894 troops were called in to quell civil strife resulting from Governor Davis Hanson Waite's siege of city hall. Later in the year they were deployed south during the Pullman Strike. Units from Fort Logan also participated in the 1898 Spanish–American War.

In 1908, the site added 340 acres, bringing their total to 940 acres. In 1909 the fort was reduced to a recruit depot and continued in that role until 1922, when the 38th Infantry was garrisoned at the post.

It was the only major military post in Colorado during World War I.

In 1927, an Engineering unit occupied Fort Logan and made major updates to the site during the Great Depression.

Fort Logan was also the site of a Citizens' Military Training Camp during the 1920s.

On 1 March 1941, the Army Air Corps moved an Army Air Forces Clerical School to Fort Logan from Lowry Army Airfield. Thus the installation came under the control of Western Technical Training Command. In 1942 the Administrative Inspector School was opened which trained air inspectors. In April 1944, Fort Logan was transferred from the Western Technical Training Command to the AAF Air Service Command for training injured soldiers in civilian trades. In addition the fort was briefly used as a prisoner of war camp in 1943 and 1944. After the war the fort was declared surplus and negotiating over what to do with the land commenced. It was closed in May 1946.

Some land was sold, 75 acres (including the burial ground) were set aside for the Fort Logan National Cemetery, and the rest was donated to the state of Colorado. The state used the site as a mental health center and the first patients were admitted in 1961. In 1991 the center was renamed to the Colorado Mental Health Institute at Fort Logan.

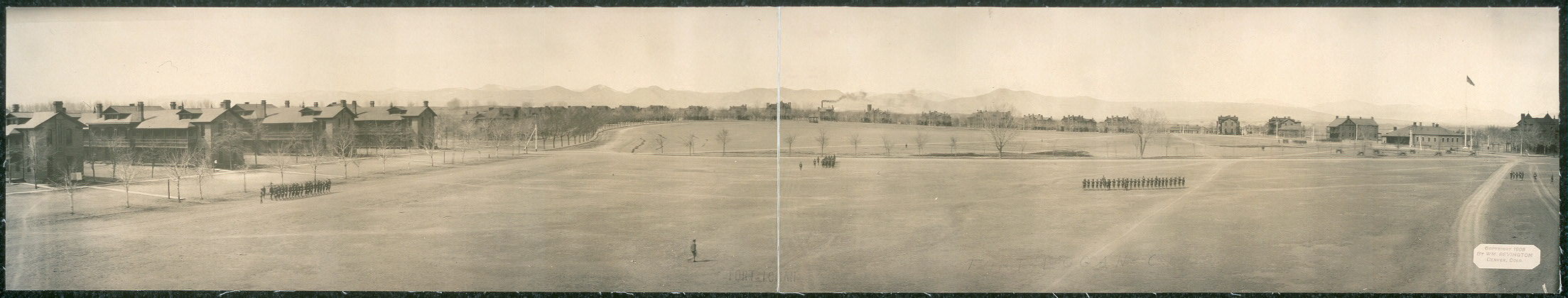
Panoramic image of Fort Logan, 1908, William Bevington

== Aftermath ==
When the post was no longer required, some of the land was used for creation of the Fort Logan National Cemetery in 1949. A Queen Anne style officer's quarters building was made into a museum. Most of the land was donated in 1960 to the state of Colorado was used for the Fort Logan Mental Health Center.

== People ==
- From 1889 to 1897, Medal of Honor recipient and Civil War veteran, Major General Henry C. Merriam, then Colonel, was commander of the 7th Infantry Regiment assigned to the fort.
- From 1901 to 1902, Medal of Honor recipient and Civil War veteran, Lieutenant General Arthur MacArthur, Jr., father of General Douglas MacArthur, was commandant of the fort.
- From 1924 to 1925, US President and General Dwight D. Eisenhower, then Major, was a recruiting officer at the fort.

== See also ==
- Western Technical Training Command
