= Atlantic City Training Center =

Former US military facility in Atlantic County, New Jersey

- USAAF Basic Training Center No. 7
- Atlantic City, New Jersey
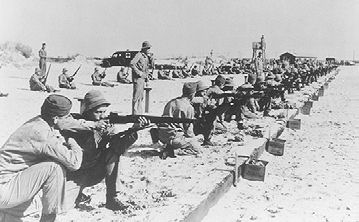
- Small Arms Training, Atlantic City, New Jersey - 1942

Site information
- Condition: Urbanized area

Location
- Atlantic City Training Center
- Coordinates: 39°21′17″N 74°26′19″W

Site history
- Built: 1942
- In use: 1942–1945
- Battles/wars: World War II

Garrison information
- Garrison: United States Army Air Forces
- Occupants: AAF Training Center (Basic)

The Atlantic City Training Center is a closed United States Army Air Forces center in Atlantic City in Atlantic County, New Jersey, United States. It was last assigned to the United States Army Air Forces Personnel Distribution Command. It was closed in 1945.

Opened in January 1942, the Atlantic City Training Center was a large enlisted basic training centers (BTC) of the Army Air Forces during World War II. The basic training center closed on 28 February 1944 and the facility was transferred to the AAF Personnel Distribution Command. It arranged the deployment of airmen to overseas groups and squadrons in combat theaters around the world until being closed in 1945 with the end of the war.

== History ==
The need to train the tens of thousands of men entering the Army Air Corps in 1942 led to the decision by the service to open additional Basic Training Centers (BTC). In June 1942, Atlantic City was selected for a BTC, and with time of the essence, the War Department leased hotels, apartment houses, and other miscellaneous building to accommodate trainees. With the assistance of public officials and owners of the city's hotels, forty-five hotels were provided for United States Military occupancy.

Included in the Army’s acquisitions was the Atlantic City Convention Hall, the largest structure of its kind in the world (at that time), to be used as the Headquarters of Basic Training Center No. 7. The main hall was used for mass exercises and physical training where up to four thousand men could do calisthenics together. Most of the other space was used for offices. The government also renovated the facility.

On 22 July 1942, the first trainees arrived for six weeks of indoctrination training. It consisted of:

- Basic military general orders, military conduct, close order and open order drill.
- Familiarization with all standard weapons, assembly, cleaning and utilization.
- Physical training with obstacle course.
- Gas mask training and procedures.
- Rifle range qualification on the 30 cal carbine rifle
- One week of field training

One part of the Atlantic City Center was the training of illiterate recruits how to read and write. Without these skills, a modern war machine could not function as designed. This task fell to the Army’s Special Training Units. The 704th Training Group, from Jefferson Barracks, Missouri, came to Atlantic City to assist the newly activated 565th Technical School Squadron. It was their mission to see that every recruit reached a fourth grade reading/writing level within twelve weeks. Instructions in reading and writing were added to the other training and drilling that recruits practiced daily.

Overcrowded conditions, however led the War Department to open a facility in Greensboro, North Carolina in 1943, and many of the men assigned to Atlantic City were sent to North Carolina to the new Basic Training Center No. 10 there. Basic training ended at Atlantic City on 28 February 1944 and jurisdiction of Greensboro was transferred to Personnel Distribution Command. The mission became preparing personnel for combat duty overseas. AAF personnel, many who had completed basic training at Atlantic City were assigned to one of the overseas air forces, equipped and scheduled for deployment to whatever part of the world they were needed.

In February 1945, overseas shipments were ended and the facility was inactivated later that year with the end of the war. All leases were terminated and the facilities returned to their civilian owners. The military facilities were completely redeveloped in the postwar years, and was incorporated into the city's urban community and there is no evidence today of the center.

Most military written records about the Atlantic City Training Center were destroyed during the 1950s and 1960s. According to an archivist at the National Archives, College Park, Maryland, the decision was made to destroy written World War II records if they were not directly related to combat units. Basic Training Center No. 7 was not considered directly connected to combat units, and its records were disposed of.

== See also ==
- New Jersey World War II Army Airfields
- Eastern Technical Training Command
