= Technical Division, Air Training Command =

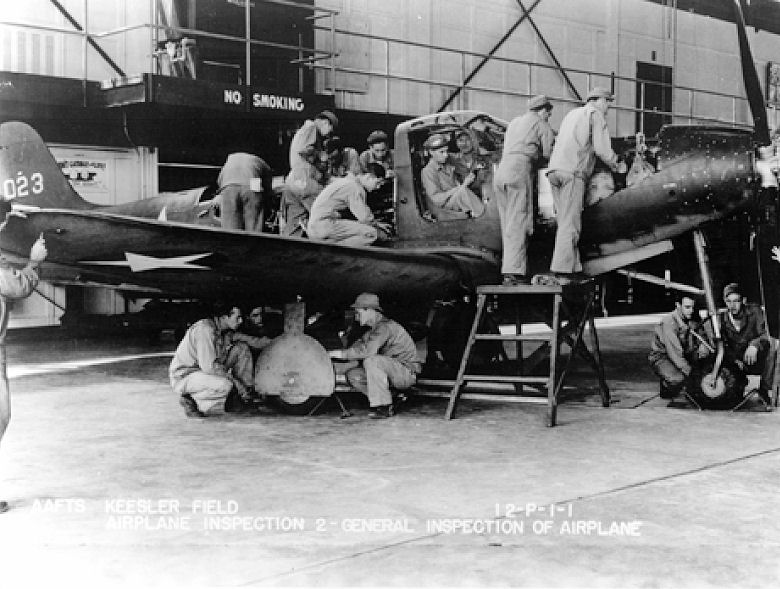
- Aircraft Mechanic Students at Keesler Field, Mississippi performing a general inspection of a Bell P-39 Airacobra ground training aircraft
- Active: 1943–1949
- Country: United States
- Branch: United States Air Force
- Role: Command of technical training units
- Part of: Air Force Training Command

The Technical Division, Air Training Command is an inactive United States Air Force unit. It was assigned to the Air Training Command, stationed at Scott Air Force Base, Illinois. It was inactivated on 14 November 1949.

== History ==
=== Origins ===
Technical training in the Air Service began about the same time as pilot training. In order to keep its airplanes operational, there was a need for skilled mechanics and other technicians. At first, men who already possessed some mechanical experience received training at civilian trade schools and state universities. Problems arose and the expense led the Army to set up two mechanic schools, one at Kelly Field, Texas and another in a large building in St Paul, Minnesota that the War Department took over.

During World War I, the school at Kelly Field had trained over 2,000 more mechanics. Though the school in St Paul closed after the end of the war, Kelly remained in operation and trained some 5,000 more mechanics before January 1921. When the supply depot at Love Field, Dallas, closed in 1921 and moved to Kelly, the Air Service mechanics's school was forced to move to Chanute Field, Illinois. In 1922, the school was expanded when the photography school at Langley Field, Virginia, and the communications school at Fort Sill, Oklahoma, both joined the mechanics course at Chanute, congregating all technical training in the Air Service at that location. The facility at Chanute was re-designated as the Air Corps Technical School in 1926, with the former separate schools becoming "Departments".

In 1930, two more Departments were established at Chanute, the Department of Clerical Instruction and the Department of Armament. Technical training expanded in 1938 at Lowry Field, Colorado, when the Photography, Armament and Clerical instruction were moved from Chanute to the new facilities in Denver. In 1939, Scott Field, Illinois, came under the Air Corps Technical School when the Department of Basic Instruction, responsible for the basic training of all new recruits, was established at Scott. It moved to Chanute in 1940 when Scott became the Air Corps Radio school.

=== Technical Training Command ===
On 1 June 1939, the Air Corps Technical School at Chanute Field was elevated to the Command level, being re-designated as Air Corps Technical Training Command. With the expansion of the Air Corps after May 1940, technical training was expanded rapidly. By early November 1941, students were entering technical training at the rate of 110,000 per year, and after the Japanese attack on Pearl Harbor the student flow rose sharply: 13,000 men entered technical training schools in January 1942 and 55,000 in December 1942.

To accommodate this rapid growth in students, additional installations were established. New technical training bases included Keesler Field, Mississippi, and Sheppard Field, Texas, both activated in 1941 with a mission of technical training. Also, because technical schools did not require flying facilities, the Army Air Forces took over a total of 452 hotels, as well as warehouses, theaters, convention halls, athletic fields, parking lots, and various other structures to accommodate student classroom space. The number of hotels at the peak of training included 337 in Miami Beach, Florida; 62 in St. Petersburg, Florida; 46 in Atlantic City, New Jersey; three in Chicago, Illinois, and two in Grand Rapids, Michigan.

The heavy burden of the greatly expanded program for technical training had forced the Air Corps to establish the Air Corps Technical Training Command on 1 March 1941. Temporary headquarters for the new command was established at Chanute Field on 26 March; In September a permanent headquarters for the command was selected at Tulsa, Oklahoma. Further decentralization was achieved by grouping the technical schools into two districts. In a functional arrangement which placed basic military and aviation mechanic training under one command and remaining specialties under another, the first district included Scott Field, Lowry Field, and Fort Logan; the second district was composed of Chanute Field, Keesler Field, Sheppard Field, and Jefferson Barracks.

This organization was abandoned on 1 November 1941 when Air Corps Technical Training Command revised the two districts and announced that four technical training districts would be established on a geographical basis to manage the expansion. These were:

- First Technical Training District, Greensboro Center, North Carolina
- Second Technical Training District, St. Louis, Missouri
- Third Technical Training District, Tulsa, Oklahoma
- Fourth Technical Training District, Denver, Colorado

Later, in November 1942, a Fifth Training District with headquarters at Miami Beach, Florida, was created to supervise the numerous technical training activities in Florida.

On 31 July 1943, the Army Air Forces reorganized AAF Training Command with the establishment of subordinate commands, three for flying training and three for technical training. The five districts that had belonged to Technical Training Command were disbanded and realigned.

- First District at Greensboro was replaced by the Eastern Technical Training Command
- Second District in St Louis was replaced by the Central Technical Training Command (CTTC)
- Fourth District in Denver was replaced by the Western Technical Training Command (WTTC)

The Third District at Tulsa, Oklahoma was divided between WTTC and CTTC. The Fifth District in Miami Beach was absorbed into the ETTC.

Requirements in the combat theaters for graduates of technical training schools and even pilots proved to be smaller than initially expected, so the Army Air Forces reduced the size of these training programs in January 1944. The Central Technical Training Command in St. Louis was discontinued 1 March 1944. All schools previously in the central command, with the exception of Keesler Field, became part of the eastern command. Keesler went to the western command. Simultaneously, the headquarters of Eastern Technical Training Command moved from Greensboro, North Carolina, to St Louis.

=== Postwar era ===
With the end of the war in September 1945, on 15 October Training Command delegated all stations and activities of the Western Technical Training Command to the jurisdiction of the Eastern Technical Training Command, which it re-designated as Technical Training Command. Its headquarters was moved to Scott Field, Illinois. Most training schools were closed as part of the demobilization of the armed forces. Technical Training Command retained seven bases as training schools:

- Scott Field, Illinois

3505th Army Air Forces Base Unit (Technical School)
3310th Technical Training Wing

- Chanute Field, Illinois

3502d Army Air Forces Base Unit (Technical School)
3345th Technical Training Wing

- Keesler Field, Mississippi

3704th Army Air Forces Base Unit (Technical School and Basic Training Center)
3380th Technical Training Wing

- Boca Raton Field, Florida

3501st Army Air Forces Base Unit (Technical School, Radar)
School inactivated 5 May 1947

- Lowry Field, Colorado

3705th Army Air Forces Base Unit (Technical School)
3415th Technical Training Wing

- Buckley Field, Colorado

3702d Army Air Forces Base Unit (Technical School)
Placed on inactive status 10 July 1946; later became a sub-field of Lowry AFB

- Amarillo Field, Texas.

3701st Army Air Forces Base Unit (Technical School, Basic Training Center)
Placed on inactive status 17 July 1946

On 1 July 1946, with the establishment to Air Training Command, Technical Training Command was re-designated as Technical Division, Air Training Command. Also, the training schools at the bases which remained open were consolidated into the Army Air Forces (later Air Force) base units. After the establishment of the United States Air Force in September 1947 and the implementation of the Hobson Wing-Base plan in 1948, the Base Units were discontinued, and ATC established new Technical Training Wings at each base. This new plan made the training organizations uniform with the other major commands throughout the Air Force.

Boca Raton Field was severely damaged by several hurricanes in the fall of 1947. It had already been targeted for closure, but the hurricanes accelerated the move of what could be salvaged of its facilities to Keesler. It took Keesler personnel several weeks to dry out and repair radar equipment. As a result, the radar school didn't open at its new location until early 1948.

Austere postwar military budgets led to additional consolidations and all of the technical programs suffered from shortages of instructors—problems that existed been with the schools throughout the postwar era. The last half of 1949 was an exercise in austerity. President Harry S. Truman decided that the country could only afford a 48-group Air Force. With only a minimum of operating funds available, the Secretary of Defense directed major spending cuts throughout the Department of Defense (DOD). In a re-organization, Technical Division, Air Training Command was inactivated on 14 November 1949 when Air Training Command absorbed its subordinate Divisions into its command organization to comply with the budget reduction directive.

=== Lineage ===
- Constituted as the Eastern Technical Training Command

Activated on 31 August 1943
Redesignated Army Air Forces Technical Training Command on 15 October 1945
Redesignated Technical Division, Air Training Command on 1 July 1946
Inactivated on 14 November 1949

=== Assignments ===
- Army Air Forces Training Command (later Air Training Command), 31 August 1943 – 14 November 1949

=== Schools ===
- Basic Training Center #7, Atlantic City Training Center, New Jersey
- RADAR Technical School, Boca Raton Army Airfield, Florida
- Basic Training Center #10; HQ ETTC, Greensboro Training Center, North Carolina
- Aircraft Mechanics Technical School; Basic Training Center, Gulfport Field, Mississippi
- Aircraft Mechanics/Weapons Technical School; Basic Training Center #2, Keesler Field, Mississippi (Reassigned to WTTC, 1 March 1944)
- Basic Training Center #4; Officer Candidate School, Miami Beach Training Center, Florida
- Weapons/Photography Technical School; Basic Training Center #9, Seymour Johnson Field, North Carolina
- Basic Training Center #6, St. Petersburg Training Center, Florida (moved to Lincoln AAF Nebraska, WTTC, 1943)
- Intelligence Technical School; Aviation Cadet School; Radio Technical School, Yale University, New Haven, Connecticut

Added 1 March 1944 when consolidated with Central Technical Training Command:

- Aircraft Mechanics Technical School, Chanute Field, Illinois
- Aircraft Engine Technical School, Stout Army Air Field, Indiana
- Basic Training Center #1, Jefferson Barracks, Missouri
- Radio Mechanics/Radio Operation Technical School, Scott Field, Illinois
- Radio Mechanics/Aircraft Radio Maintenance Technical School, Sioux Falls Army Air Field, South Dakota
- Radio Mechanics/Radio Operation Technical School, Tomah Army Airfield Technical School, Wisconsin
- Radio Mechanics/Radio Operation Technical School, Truax Field, Wisconsin

=== Stations ===
- Greensboro Center, North Carolina, 1 November 1941
- St. Louis, Missouri, 1 March 1944
- Scott Field, Illinois, 15 October 1945 – 14 November 1949
