= St. Petersburg Training Center =

- USAAF Basic Training Center No. 6
- St. Petersburg, Florida
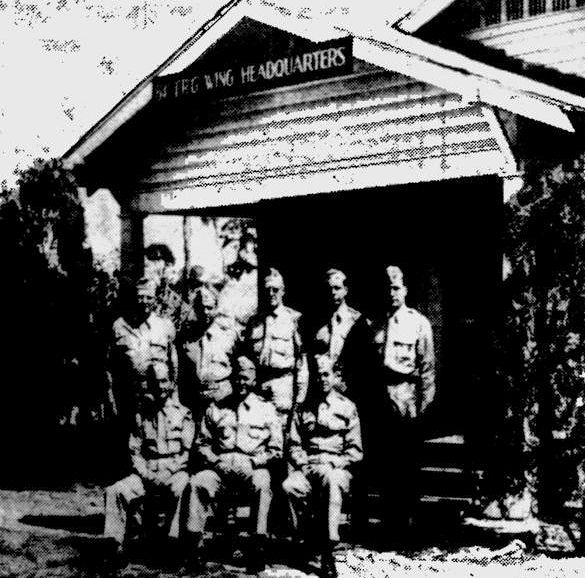
- Officer staff of the St Petersburg Training Center Headquarters, St. Petersburg, Florida, April 1943

Site information
- Condition: Urbanized area

Location
- St. Petersburg Training Center
- Coordinates: 27°57′48″N 82°45′51″W

Site history
- Built: 1942
- In use: 1942–1943
- Battles/wars: World War II

Garrison information
- Garrison: United States Army Air Forces
- Occupants: AAF Training Center (Basic)

The St. Petersburg Training Center is a closed United States Air Force facility that was located in St. Petersburg, Florida. It was last assigned to the United States Army Air Forces Personnel Distribution Command. It was closed in 1945.

Opened on 6 July 1942, the St. Petersburg Training Center was an enlisted basic training centers (BTC) of the Army Air Forces during World War II. The basic training center closed on 19 July 1943 and was moved to Lincoln Army Airfield, Nebraska. Subsequently, the facility was transferred to the AAF Personnel Distribution Command. It arranged the deployment of airmen to overseas groups and squadrons in combat theaters around the world.

== History ==
The need to train the tens of thousands of men entering the Army Air Corps in 1942 led to the decision by the service to open additional Basic Training Centers (BTC). In June 1942, St. Petersburg, Florida was selected for a BTC, and with time of the essence, the War Department leased hotels, apartment houses, and other miscellaneous building to accommodate trainees. With the assistance of public officials and owners of the city's hotels, sixty-two hotels were provided for United States Military occupancy. The facility was located in Downtown St. Petersburg, and during its year of operation, additional locations in Clearwater and Clearwater Beach were leased by the War Department. A Rifle Range was located on the beach in Clearwater.

The first personnel arrived on 6 July 1942 when the 604th Technical School Squadron (later the 607th Training Group) arrived. The 603d TSS (later 607th TG) arrived on the 9th and the 586th TSS (later 603d TG) on 11 July. All four units moved into the Vinoy Hotel in St. Petersburg, Florida which had been leased by the War Department. These units set up the basic training center, the first recruits arrived at AAF Basic Training Center No. 6 at the end of August 1942.

Army Air Forces basic training consisted of:

- Basic military general orders, military conduct, close order and open order drill.
- Familiarization with all standard weapons, assembly, cleaning and utilization.
- Physical training with obstacle course.
- Gas mask training and procedures.
- Rifle range qualification on the 30 cal carbine rifle
- One week of field training.

During the next twelve months, thousands of trainees were given basic Army Air Force indoctrination, and classified into their military occupational specialties (MOS). From the St. Petersburg Center, after graduation they were assigned to various Technical Schools for advanced training. Some were sent to Maxwell Field, Alabama where they attended aviation pre-flight school for initial training as air cadets, where they could be further classified for pilot, navigator, bombardier or flexible gunnery training.

At the end of May 1943, it was announced by the First Technical Training District, Army Air Forces Technical Training Command at Greensboro Center, North Carolina, that the St. Petersburg training center would be closed, and the facility would be transferred to Lincoln Army Airfield, Nebraska. The last trainees began graduating in June, with the last class ending in the beginning of July. The permanent party personnel were given new assignments and on 19 July 1943, the flag came down at its headquarters.

All leases were terminated and the facilities returned to their civilian owners. The military facilities were completely redeveloped in the postwar years, and was incorporated into the city's urban community. Today, no evidence of the facility remains.

== Major units assigned ==
- USAAF Basic Training Center No. 6

603d, 604th, 607th Training Group, 6 July 1942 – 19 July 1943

== See also ==
- Florida World War II Army Airfields
- Eastern Technical Training Command
