= Logan School for Creative Learning =

The Logan School for Creative Learning

Location
- 1005 Yosemite St., Denver, Colorado; 39°43′53″N 104°53′13″W

Information
- Former name: The Denver School
- Type: Private/Independent
- Established: 1981
- Head of school: Nicole Girvan
- Teaching staff: 26
- Grades: K – 8
- Enrollment: 241
- Average class size: 19
- Student to teacher ratio: 1:9
- Education system: Co-ed
- Campus size: 13 acres (5.3 ha)
- Campus type: Urban
- Teams: Logan Lightning (athletic, formerly Logan Learners)
- Accreditations: Association of Colorado Independent Schools (ACIS) and National Association of Independent Schools (NAIS)
- Website: www.theloganschool.org

The Logan School for Creative Learning is a Co-ed private school in Denver, Colorado that serves students in grades K-8 on a 13-acre campus. The Logan School's mission is to provide an experience-based education to students with above average cognitive abilities. Students are co-architects of their own education, choosing and designing their own unit of study.

== History ==
The Logan School for Creative Learning (previously The Denver School for the Gifted and Creative) was founded by Patti McKinnell in 1981. It began with seven children in a church basement on South Federal Boulevard in Denver. In 1999, The Logan School moved to the former Lowry Air Force Base, where it is one of several independent schools on a 1,866-acre (7.55 km^{2}) site that has been redeveloped as a mixed-use urban community.

Nicole Girvan is the current Head of School.

McKinnel retired at the end of the 2019–2020 school year.

== Recognition ==
Some Logan students have received an award from the National Renewable Energy Laboratory (NREL) for their work.

== Athletics ==
Students on sports teams compete against other schools in the area. Sports offered as of 2020 include: co-ed cross country, girls volleyball, boys and girls basketball, co-ed ultimate frisbee and girls soccer.

== Admission process ==
The admission process includes a tour and information session, application, student questionnaire, teacher recommendation and the completion of either a Wechsler or Differential Ability Scales test. Once all the paperwork is submitted, a parent interview and classroom observation may be scheduled. A panel reviews each application to determine the school's ability to serve the applicant, after which families are notified if they will be offered a position, or if their child will be added to a waiting list.
