= Western Technical Training Command =

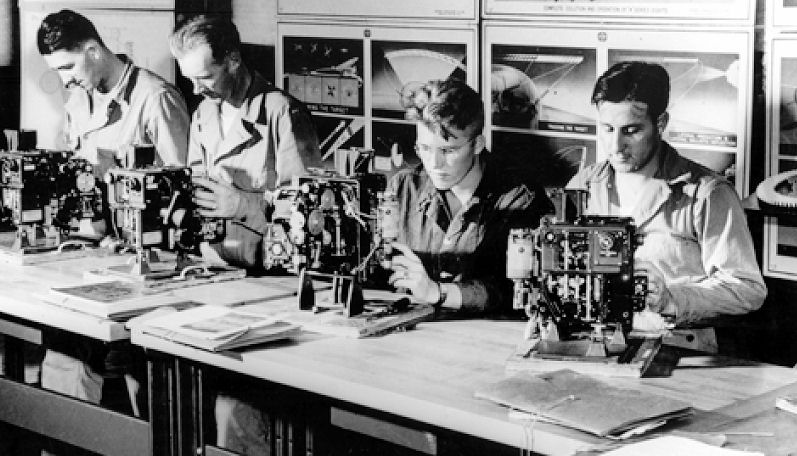
- Bombsight Maintenance training course, Lowry Field, Colorado, 1944
- Active: 1941–1945
- Country: United States
- Branch: United States Army Air Forces
- Type: Command and Control
- Role: Training
- Part of: Army Air Forces Training Command
- Engagements: World War II: World War II American Theater

Western Technical Training Command was a command of the United States Army Air Forces. It was assigned to the Army Air Forces Training Command, and stationed at Denver, Colorado throughout its existence. It was inactivated on 15 October 1945.

== History ==
The command was established initially on 1 November 1941 as a result of the expansion of the Air Corps after May 1940. By early November 1941, students were entering technical training at the rate of 110,000 per year, and Air Corps Technical Command set up five geographically separated districts to manage the expansion.

Fort Logan appears to have come under the command's jurisdiction on 1 March 1941, when a clerical school was moved there from Lowry Army Airfield.

Fourth Technical Training District was headquartered at Denver, Colo., on 5 March 1942 and construction of a cantonment at the Lowry Auxiliary Landing Field ("Lowry Field Number 2") "began on 5 May 1942" where armament training commenced 6 July 1942. Circa January 1943, Lowry's courses for "communications, engineering, armament and photography aviation cadets" transferred to Yale University which was the lead for contract facilities.

On 31 July 1943, the new Western Training Training Command was activated. It was a redesignation of the Fourth Technical Training District and also absorbed a portion of the former Third Technical Training District that had been previously headquartered at Tulsa, Oklahoma. The Central Technical Training Command in St. Louis was discontinued 1 March 1944. Keesler Field was the only installation added to WTTC as a result of the disestablishment of CTTC.

Requirements in the combat theaters for graduates of technical training schools and even pilots proved to be smaller than initially expected, so the Army Air Forces reduced the size of these training programs in January 1944. With the end of the war in September 1945, on 15 October Western Technical Training Command was inactivated. All its units and stations were reassigned to the Eastern Technical Training Command.

=== Lineage ===
- Established as Fourth Technical Training District, on 1 November 1941

Re-designated: Western Technical Training Command, on 31 August 1943
Inactivated on 15 October 1945.

=== Assignments ===
- Air Corps Technical Training Command, 1 November 1941
- Army Air Forces Technical Training Command, 1 March 1942
- Army Air Forces Training Command, 31 July 1943 – 15 October 1945

=== Schools ===
- Aircraft Mechanics Technical School; Basic Training Center #8, Amarillo Field, Texas
- Weapons/Photographic Technical School, Buckley Field, Colorado
- Administration Technical School; Miscellaneous Support Services training, Fort Logan, Colorado
- Quartermasters Technical School; Basic Training Center #5, Kearns Center, Utah
- Aircraft Mechanics/Weapons Technical School; Basic Training Center, Keesler Field, Mississippi (After 1 March 1944)
- Engine Mechanics Technical School; Basic Training Center #6, Lincoln Army Air Field, Nebraska
- Weapons/Photographic Technical School; Miscellaneous training, Lowry Field, Colorado
- Civil Engineering Technical School; Basic Training Center #3, Sheppard Field, Texas
