= Central Technical Training Command =

Former military unit in St. Louis, Missouri

Coordinates: 38°38′58″N 90°16′14″W

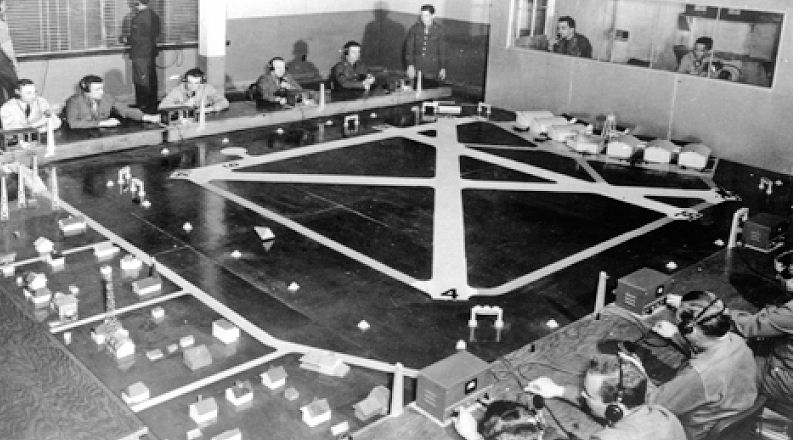
- The Airfield Control Tower course at Chanute Field used a model airfield to teach students.
- Active: 1941–1944
- Country: United States
- Branch: United States Army Air Forces
- Type: Command and Control
- Role: Training
- Part of: Army Air Forces Training Command
- Engagements: World War II: World War II American Theater

Central Technical Training Command is an inactive United States Air Force unit. It was assigned to the Army Air Forces Training Command, stationed at Saint Louis, Missouri. It was inactivated on 1 March 1944.

== History ==
The command was established initially on 1 November 1941 as a result of the expansion of the Air Corps after May 1940. By early November 1941, students were entering technical training at the rate of 110,000 per year, and Air Corps Technical Command set up five geographically separated districts to manage the expansion. The Second Technical Training District controlled technical training schools in the Great Lakes area.

On 31 July 1943, the Army Air Forces continued with organizational actions related to the activation of Training Command. The five districts that had belonged to Technical Training Command were transferred to the new AAF Training Command. However, on 31 August 1943, Training Command disbanded two of the districts and merged them into three, being Eastern, Central and Western Training Commands. Central Training Command remained under the command of former Second District commander, Major General Frederick L. Martin upon its creation until it disbanded. For its last three months of existence, it was under the acting command of Brigadier General Sheplar Fitzgerald while Martin was hospitalized.

With the war winding down, requirements in the combat theaters for new graduates of technical training schools and even pilots proved to be smaller than initially planned for, so the Army Air Forces reduced the size of these training programs in January 1944. The Central Technical Training Command in St. Louis was discontinued 1 March 1944. All schools previously in the central command became part of the Eastern command.

=== Lineage ===
- Established as Second Technical Training District, on 1 November 1941

Re-designated: Central Technical Training Command, on 31 August 1943
Inactivated on 1 March 1944.

=== Assignments ===
- Air Corps Technical Training Command, 1 November 1941
- Army Air Forces Technical Training Command, 1 March 1942
- Army Air Forces Training Command, 31 July 1943 – 1 March 1944

=== Schools ===
- Aircraft Mechanics Technical School, Chanute Field, Illinois
- Aircraft Engine Technical School, Stout Army Air Field, Indiana
- Basic Training Center #1, Jefferson Barracks, Missouri
- Radio Mechanics/Radio Operation Technical School, Scott Field, Illinois
- Radio Mechanics/Aircraft Radio Maintenance Technical School, Sioux Falls Field, South Dakota
- Radio Mechanics/Radio Operation Technical School, Tomah Army Airfield Technical School, Wisconsin
- Radio Mechanics/Radio Operation Technical School, Truax Field, Wisconsin

=== Stations ===
- St. Louis, Missouri, 1 November 1941 – 1 March 1944
