= Greensboro Training Center =

1940s US Army Air Forces installation in North Carolina

- USAAF Basic Training Center No. 10; Greensboro Overseas Replacement Depot
- Part of USAAF Eastern Technical Training Command
- Greensboro, North Carolina
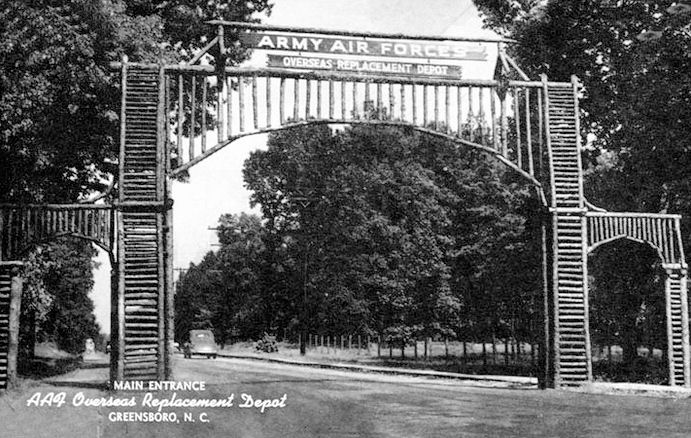
- Main Gate at the Greensboro North Carolina Overseas Replacement Depot, 1944

Site information
- Condition: Urbanized area

Location
- Greensboro Training Center
- Coordinates: 36°05′14″N 79°45′47″W

Site history
- Built: 1942
- In use: 1941–1946
- Battles/wars: World War II

Garrison information
- Garrison: United States Army Air Forces
- Occupants: AAF Training Center (Basic); Overseas Replacement Depot; Separation Center

The Greensboro Training Center (Greensboro Overseas Replacement Depot) is a closed United States Army Air Forces installation. It was last assigned to the United States Army Personnel Distribution Command. It was closed on 15 December 1946.

The Greensboro Center opened in November 1941 as the headquarters of the First Technical Training District, Air Corps Technical Training Command. In 1943, it was expanded to become AAF Basic Training Center No. 10, welcoming nearly 90,000 men into the United States Army Air Forces to undergo basic military training (BMT). Transferred to the Army Personnel Distribution Center in June 1944, the Greensboro Overseas Replacement Depot (ORD), arranged the deployment of over 150,000 airmen to overseas groups and squadrons in combat theaters around the world. With the end of the war in 1945, nearly 30,000 men were demobilized from the Army Air Forces and returned to civilian life at Greensboro.

== History ==
The center was established as a headquarters for the Technical Training Command, First District on 1 November 1941 which operated from the Pilot Life Complex in Sedgefield.

However severe overcrowding at Basic Training Center No. 7 at Atlantic City, New Jersey led to the decision to expand Greensboro in 1942 to accommodate and train recruits. 652 acres on the city's east side was leased for a facility large enough to train and mobilize the tens of thousands of crewmen needed for the air war in Europe and Asia. Strategically located, surrounded by the necessary transportation and support facilities.

Basic Training Center No. 10 opened on 1 March 1943, and during the spring and summer of 1943, carpenters were erecting barracks and warehouses. Trainees endured from four to eight weeks of intensive training in weapons, drill, physical fitness, and chemical warfare. Airmen then left for advanced training at other bases prior to assignment in combat theaters around the world.

At first the center was limited to new recruits, however it was expanded to include new nurses, pre-aviation cadets, convalescents, and regular Army and Service troops. Among the 87,500 trainees who passed through the facility were members of the Women's Army Corps, whose six-week stints trained them in a variety of administrative and support fields. The center also trained African American airmen, a fact that displeased some of Greensboro's citizens. Black servicemen were segregated, and despite their repeated requests for equal treatment as military personnel, their training was restricted to support services and labor battalions.

Training continued by ETTC until 1 May 1944 when jurisdiction of Greensboro was transferred to the AAF Personnel Distribution Command. The mission was changed from basic training to the preparation of airmen and soldiers for overseas combat duty. AAF personnel, many who had completed basic training at Greensboro were assigned to one of the overseas air forces, equipped and scheduled for deployment to whatever part of the world they were needed.

In February 1945, overseas shipments were ended and Personnel Redistribution Center No. 5 was established to begin the task of returning overseas personnel from the European Theater of Operations, and the Mediterranean Theater of Operations to the Pacific Theater to enter combat against the Japanese Empire. With the end of the war in the Pacific, on 17 September 1945 the final mission of Greensboro was initiated, to assist in the expedient separation of personnel back to civilian life. That mission was completed and the Greensboro Center was inactivated on 15 December 1946. It was declared surplus eight days later.

Today, a North Carolina State Historical marker notes the Greensboro Center. It is located west of the intersection of U.S. Route 70 on the south side of East Wendover Avenue in Greensboro. The marker is located at the approximate midpoint of the facility. The facility itself was completely redeveloped in the postwar years, and was incorporated into the city's urban community.

== Major units assigned ==
- Headquarters, Technical Training Command, First District, 1 November 1941 – 30 July 1943
- Headquarters, Eastern Technical Training Command, 31 July 1943 – 1 March 1944
- Basic Training Center No. 10

301st Training Wing
1182–1187th Training Groups

- Overseas Replacement Depot, Greensboro

1060th Army Air Force Base Unit (Overseas Replacement Depot)

== See also ==
- North Carolina World War II Army Airfields
