= List of United States Space Force installations =

Installations operated by the United States Space Force

This is a list of installations operated by the United States Space Force (USSF), located within the United States and abroad. Locations where the Space Force has a notable presence but do not operate the facility will also be listed, as the service branch develops.

== Background ==
The location and number of US Space Force installations is in proportion to the size of the prior US Air Force-led US Space Command, the capabilities of available weapon systems, and the strategies contemplated for their employment. As of December 2020, the number of active duty Space Force bases is six, with several more smaller USSF stations, and most of them located within the continental United States.

== Locations of current US Space Force installations ==
Some installations are still called "Air Force Base", although operated by the US Space Force.

- Buckley Space Force Base in Aurora, Colorado
- Clear Space Force Station in Anderson, Alaska
- Los Angeles Air Force Base in El Segundo, California
- Patrick Space Force Base near Satellite Beach, Florida. (Cape Canaveral Space Force Station is also located in the area, near Kennedy Space Center)
- Peterson Space Force Base in Colorado Springs, Colorado
- Schriever Space Force Base in Colorado Springs, Colorado
- Vandenberg Space Force Base in Lompoc, California

== Contiguous United States ==
Installations and locations in the contiguous United States. For Alaska and Hawaii see Pacific, East Asia and South East Asia section.

US Space Force installations located within mainland United States. Joint bases with a Space Force presence are prefixed JB. Some Bases have not officially named Space Force Installations yet, and are still called "Air Force Base" despite being operated by the Space Force.

Space Operations Command

Space Systems Command

US Space Force installations and locations within the United States
Name	Location	State or area	Coordinates	Wing or unit emblem	Host wing or primary unit	Primary missions and units
Buckley Space Force Base	Aurora	Colorado	39°42′06″N 104°45′06″W		460th Space Wing	Space Base Delta 2; Mission Delta 4; 140th Wing COANG; 743rd MI BN USA; 169th FA BDE COARNG; Combat Logistics Bn 453 USMC; Navy Information Operations Command - Colorado
Peterson Space Force Base	Colorado Springs	Colorado	38°49′25″N 104°41′42″W		Space Base Delta 1	Space Operations Command (SpOC); Space & Missile Defense Command USA; NORAD; USNORTHCOM; Air Combat Command USAF; Air Mobility Command USAF; Air Force Reserve Command; Colorado Air National Guard
Schriever Space Force Base	Colorado Springs	Colorado	38°48′12″N 104°31′32″W		310th Space Wing	2nd Space Wing; 50th Space Wing; Space Base Delta 41
Los Angeles Air Force Base	El Segundo	California	33°55′08″N 118°22′50″W		Space Systems Command (SSC)	Space Base Delta 3
Patrick Space Force Base	Satellite Beach	Florida	28°14′06″N 80°36′36″W		Space Launch Delta 45 (SLD 45)	920th Rescue Wing USAF; 114th Space Control Squadron FLANG
Vandenberg Space Force Base	Lompoc	California	34°43′58″N 120°34′05″W		Space Launch Delta 30 (SLD 30)	381st Training Group USAF; 576th Flight Test Squadron USAF; 195th Wing CAANG
Cheyenne Mountain Space Force Station	Cheyenne Mountain	Colorado	38°44′37″N 104°50′48″W		NORAD	
Cape Cod Space Force Station	Sagamore	Massachusetts	41°45′12″N 70°32′19″W		6th Space Warning Squadron	
New Boston Space Force Station	Hillsborough County	New Hampshire	42°33′53″N 71°22′27″W		23rd Space Operations Squadron	
Cape Canaveral Space Force Station	Cocoa Beach	Florida	28°29′20″N 80°34′40″W		Space Launch Delta 45	System Delta 80

== Overseas ==
United States Space Force installations outside of the contiguous United States.

Space Operations Command

Space Systems Command

US Space Force outside of the contiguous United States
Name	Location	Unit Emblem	Unit Designation	Notes/Mission
RAF Ascension Island	Saint Helena, Ascension and Tristan da Cunha		45th Mission Support Squadron (Detachment 2)	Royal Air Force base made available to the United States by the British government, hosting a Geographically Separate Unit (GSU) of Space Launch Delta 45.
Clear Space Force Station	United States (Alaska)		13th Space Warning Squadron; 213th Space Warning Squadron	Hosting a Geographically Separate Unit (GSU) of Space Delta 4 and the 168th Wing of the Alaska Air National Guard. Operates a radar station for detecting incoming ICBMs and submarine-launched ballistic missiles to NORAD's command center and to provide Space Surveillance data to the USSF.
RAF Feltwell	United Kingdom		73rd Intelligence, Surveillance, and Reconnaissance Squadron (Detachment 4)	Royal Air Force base made available to the United States by the British government, hosting a Geographically Separate Unit (GSU) of Space Delta 7.
RAF Fylingdales	United Kingdom		Space Delta 4 (Operating Location Fylingdales)	Royal Air Force base made available to the United States by the British government, hosting a Geographically Separate Unit (GSU) of Space Delta 4 operating the AN/FPS-132 Upgraded Early Warning Radar.
Ka’ena Point Space Force Station	United States (Hawaii)		21st Space Operations Squadron (Detachment 3)	Tracking station forming part of the Satellite Control Network. Hosting a Geographically Separate Unit (GSU) of Space Delta 6.
Maui Space Surveillance Complex	United States (Hawaii)		15th Space Surveillance Squadron; 20th Space Surveillance Squadron (Detachment 3)	Maui Space Surveillance Complex (MSSC) is located at the 10,023 foot-summit of Haleakala on the island of Maui, Hawaii as part of the Haleakalā Observatory, hosting Geographically Separate Units (GSUs) of Space Delta 2. The MSSC is host to small, medium, and large-aperture tracking optics, including the DoD's largest optical telescope designed for tracking and imaging satellites, with visible and infrared sensors to collect data on near-Earth and deep-space objects.
RAF Oakhanger	United Kingdom		23rd Space Operations Squadron (Operating Location Alpha)	Royal Air Force base made available to the United States by the British government, hosting a Geographically Separate Unit (GSU) of Space Delta 6.
Pituffik Space Base	Greenland		821st Space Base Group; 12th Space Warning Squadron; 23rd Space Operations Squadron (Detachment 1)	Royal Danish Air Force base made available to the United States by the Danish government, hosting Geographically Separate Units (GSUs) of Space Base Delta 1, Space Delta 4, and Space Delta 6. Home to the 12th Space Warning Squadron which operates a Ballistic Missile Early Warning System.

== US Space Force installation terminology ==
In the US Air Force, active duty installations are normally named after notable Air Force personnel, whereas Air Force Reserve and Air National Guard installations are named in the same manner or after the community in which they are located. Because the Space Force is a new service branch, it is defaulting to the current Air Force terminology for its rank structure and location names. It may follow the aforementioned guidelines of the Air Force, follow guidelines of the US Navy, or create its own standard. The USSF does not currently operate a reserve or national guard force.

== See also ==
- List of United States Air Force installations
- List of United States Army installations
- List of United States Marine Corps installations
- List of United States Navy installations
- List of United States Coast Guard installations
- List of United States military bases
- Lists of military installations
