= Buckley Space Force Base =

U.S. Space Force base in Arapahoe County, Colorado, United States

- Aurora, Colorado in the United States
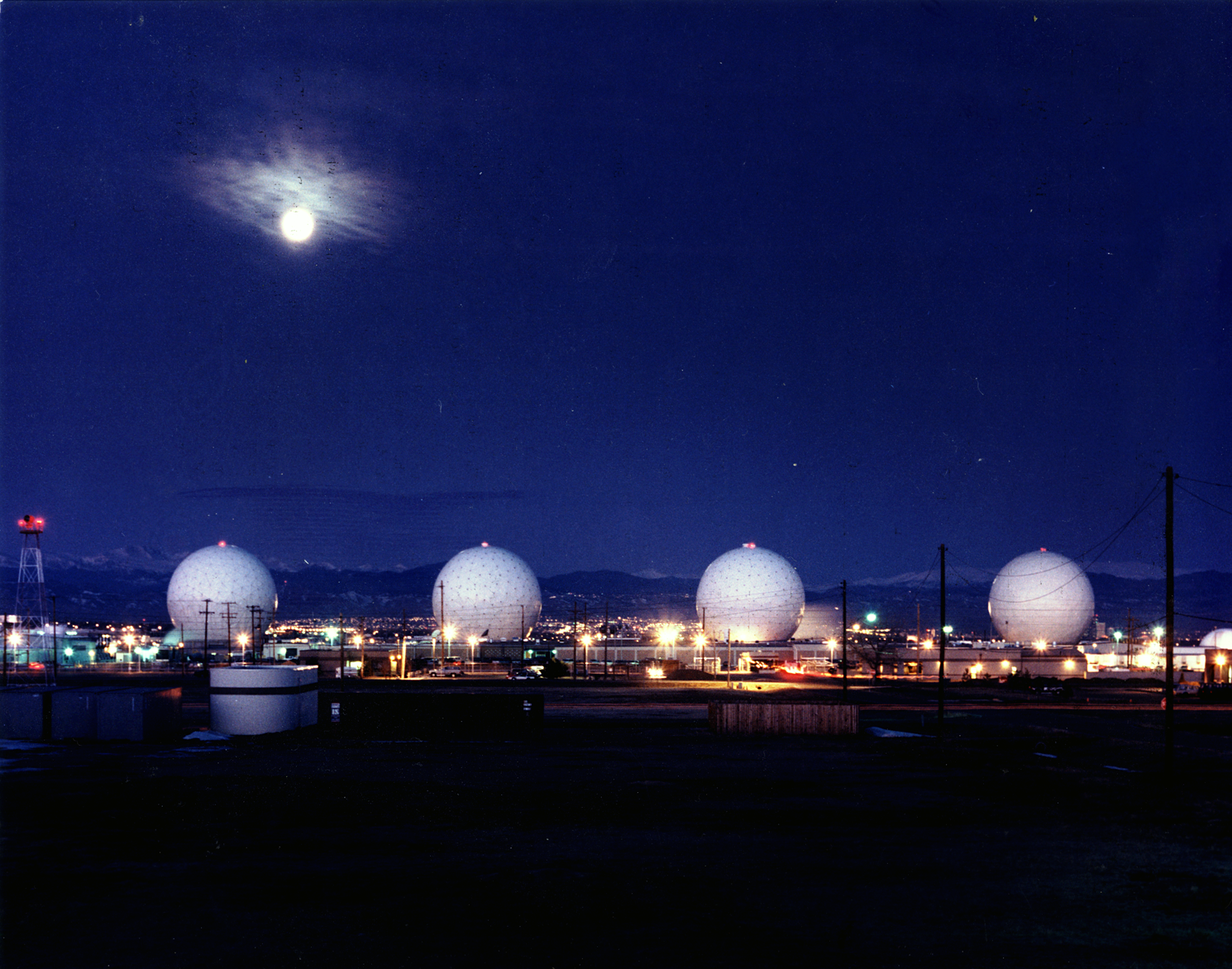
- Radomes protecting satellite dishes and other space operations equipment at Buckley Space Force Base

- Emblem of Space Base Delta 2

Site information
- Type: US Space Force Base
- Owner: Department of Defense
- Operator: United States Space Force
- Controlled by: Space Operations Command
- Website: www.buckley.spaceforce.mil

Location
- Location within Colorado Location within the United States
- Coordinates: 39°42′06″N 104°45′06″W

Site history
- Built: 1938 (as Demolition Bombing Range–Lowry Auxiliary Field)
- In use: 1938 – present

Garrison information
- Current commander: Colonel Marcus D. Jackson
- Garrison: Space Base Delta 2
- Occupants: Space Delta 4; Aerospace Data Facility-Colorado; 140th Wing; Air Reserve Personnel Center; Navy Operational Support Center–Denver; Army Aviation Support Facility

Airfield information
- Identifiers: IATA: BFK, ICAO: KBKF, FAA LID: BKF, WMO: 724695
- Elevation: 1,726.1 meters (5,663 ft) AMSL
Runways
Direction	Length and surface
14/32	3,354.7 meters (11,006 ft) PEM

Buckley Space Force Base (IATA: BFK, ICAO: KBKF, FAA LID: BKF) is a United States Space Force base in Aurora, Colorado, named after United States Army Air Service First Lieutenant John Harold Buckley. The base is run by Space Base Delta 2, with major units including the U.S. Space Force's Space Delta 4 (flies the Defense Support Program and Space-Based Infrared System constellations from Buckley SFB and commands the Space Force's missile warning forces), the Colorado Air National Guard's 140th Wing (flies the F-16C Fighting Falcon), the Denver Naval Operations Support Center, and the National Reconnaissance Office's Aerospace Data Facility-Colorado.

Buckley was established in 1938 by the United States Army Air Corps as Demolition Bombing Range–Lowry Auxiliary Field, before being renamed Buckley Field in 1941, serving as a training base. In 1947, it became Naval Air Station Denver, serving as a reserve air station for the U.S. Navy. In 1961 it became Buckley Air National Guard Base, and had its first space mission in 1969. In 2000, it became Buckley Air Force Base under Air Force Space Command, before assuming its current name of Buckley Space Force Base in 2021.

== History ==
=== Buckley Field (1938–1947) ===
In 1938, the city of Denver purchased a 100-square mile area of land several miles east of the city and donated it to the United States War Department. The United States Army Air Corps used the Demolition Bombing Range–Lowry Auxiliary Field, or Lowry II, as a bombing range, auxiliary landing field, and ammunition depot to support operations from its training sites at Lowry Field. On 14 June 1941, the United States Army Air Forces renamed the base Buckley Field in honor of United States Army Air Service First Lieutenant John Harold Buckley, a World War I pilot from Longmont, Colorado, who flew with the 28th Aero Squadron and was killed in a mid air collision on 27 September 1918 during the Meuse–Argonne offensive.

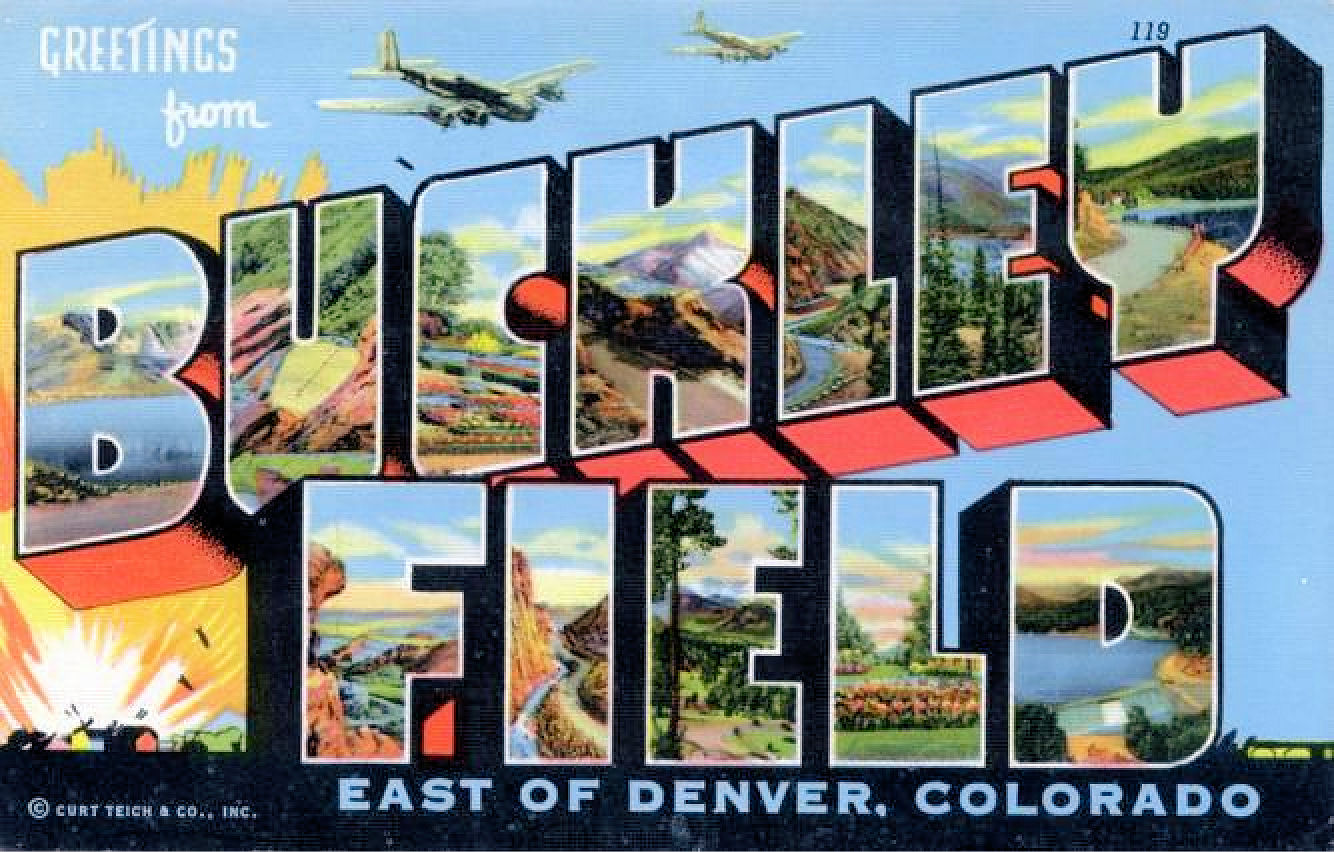
World War II postcard

Prior to the United States' entry into World War II, the War Department assigned Buckley Field as an Army Air Corps Technical School to train an additional 55,000 airmen per year in anticipation of its entry into the conflict on the side of the Allies. Under the command of the 336th Headquarters and Air Base Squadron (Army Air Forces Technical Training Command), later the 3702d Army Air Force Base Unit, construction on the base began in May 1942, resulting in the construction of over 700 buildings. The Technical Training School opened on 1 July 1942, training aircraft fighter armorers, while the nearby technical training school at Lowry Field trained aircraft bomber armorers. In 1943, Buckely Field expanded to include basic training for enlisted personnel and aviation cadets, chemical warfare, and arctic survival training for Air Transport Command's Alaskan Wing. The arctic survival school conducted classroom training at Buckley and field training at Echo Lake, near the summit of Mount Blue Sky. Technical training at the base was under the jurisdiction of the Western Technical Training Command. During the war, Buckley Field graduated over 52,000 armament students, 4,500 arctic survival students, and 37,000 basic trainees.

Following the end of World War II in 1945, Buckley Field fell into disuse and in June 1946, the Army Air Forces Technical Training Command announced that the base would become inactive. In December 1946, the Colorado Air National Guard began to set up operations at the base.

=== Naval Air Station Denver (1947–1960) ===
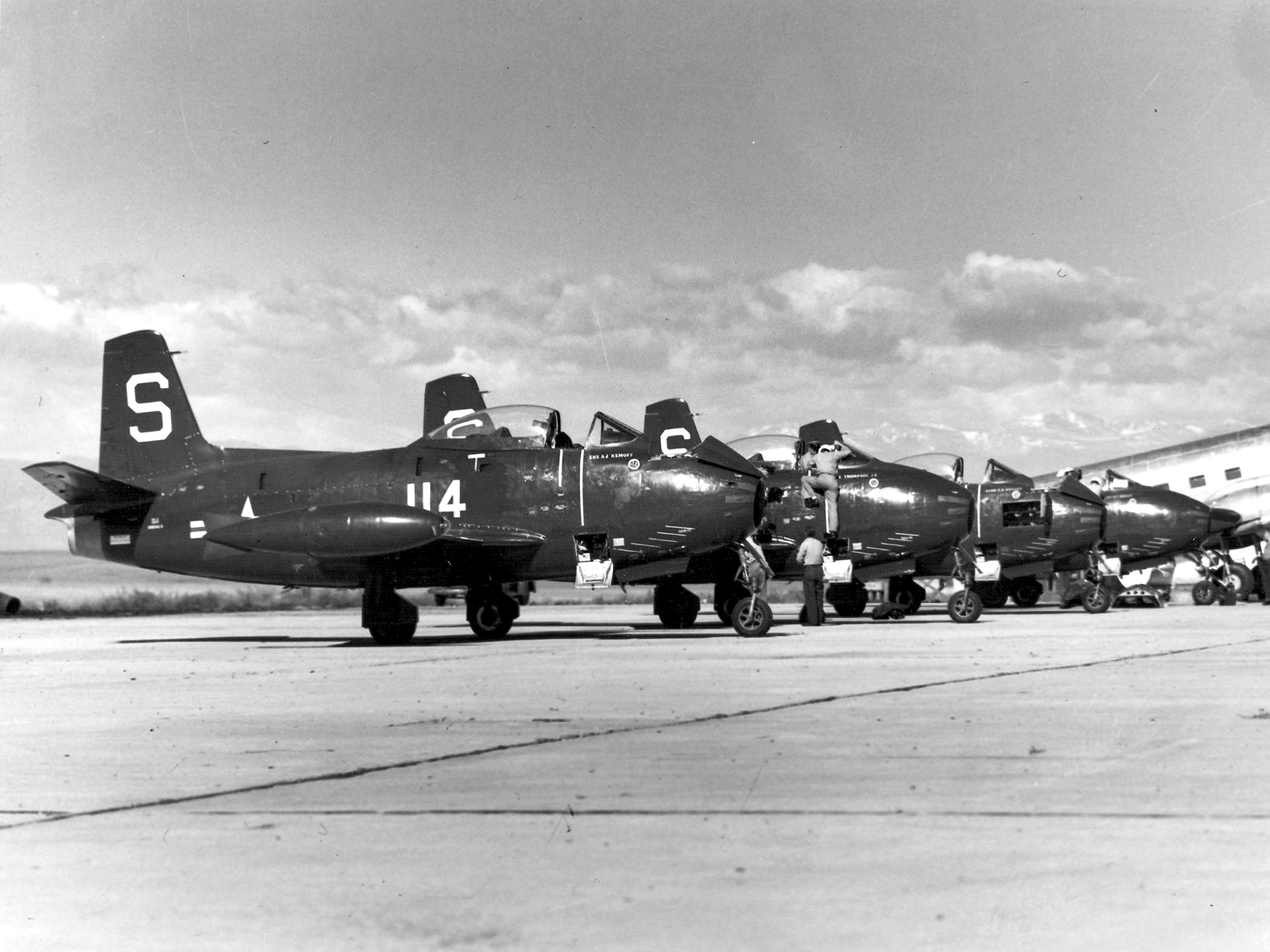
FJ-1 Furies of VF-5A at Naval Air Station Denver in 1949.

In 1946, the Department of the Navy issued a requirement for an inland Naval Air Reserve Station that could serve as a refueling stop for its aircraft, as well as a Naval Reserve station for sailors in New Mexico, Colorado, Wyoming, Utah, and parts of North and South Dakota and Nebraska. The first sailors were assigned to Buckley Field in December 1946, and the base was transitioned to the United States Navy on 28 September 1947, becoming Naval Air Station Denver (NAS–D).

The Colorado Air National Guard remained at the site, with its 86th Fighter Wing continuing flying operations. The 120th Fighter Squadron first flew the North American F-51 Mustang, before transitioning to the Lockheed F-80 Shooting Star in 1953. On 31 October 1950, the 86th Fighter Wing was inactivated, transitioning responsibility for Air National Guard operations to the 140th Fighter Wing. The 140th Fighter Wing was redesignated several times, becoming the 140th Fighter–Bomber Wing in 1951, 140th Fighter–Interceptor Wing in 1955, and the 140th Air Defense Wing in 1957. The 140th Fighter–Bomber Wing briefly deployed to fly in the Korean War. In November 1953, the 140th Fighter–Bomber Wing activated the Minute Men Air National Guard demonstration team, originally flying F-80 Shooting Stars, but later transitioning to the North American F-86 Sabre.

In 1957, a radar detection site administered by the 138th Air Control and Warning Squadron was established.

=== Buckley Air National Guard Base (1960–2000) ===
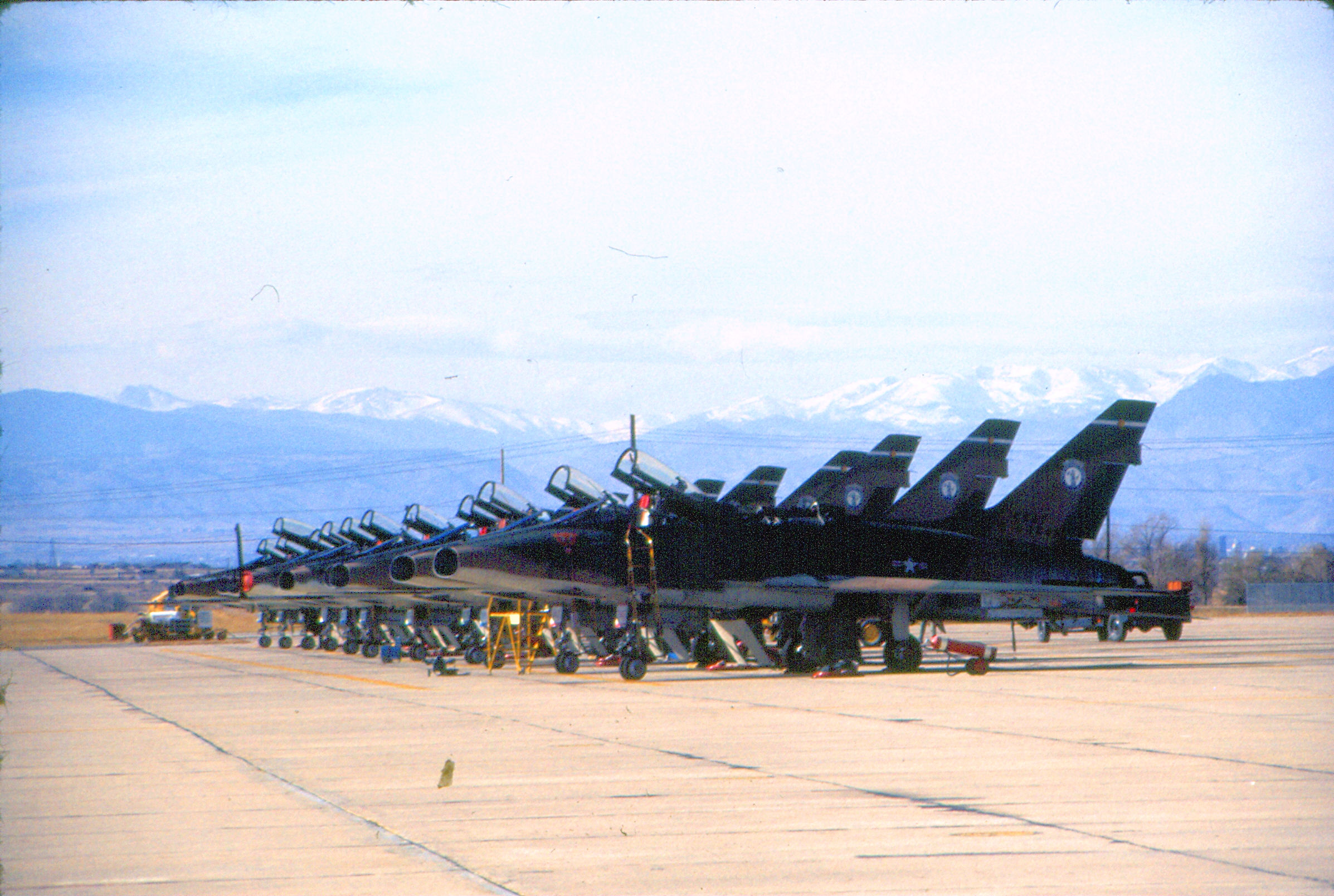
The 140th Tactical Fighter Wing's F-100D Super Sabres on the Buckley Air National Guard Base flightline in 1974.

In June 1959, the Department of the Navy planned to close thirty Naval Air Reserve stations as part of budget cutting measures, including Naval Air Station Denver. On 18 April 1960, the base was turned over to the Department of the Air Force, becoming Buckley Air National Guard Base, the first stand-alone Air National Guard base in the United States Air Force. The United States Navy continued to maintain a Naval Air Reserve Center at the base. During the 1960s, development edged toward Buckley and the land of the air base was annexed to Aurora in 1965 and 1966.

The 140th Air Defense Wing assumed responsibilities for the base. In 1961 the 140th Air Defense Wing became the 140th Tactical Fighter Wing, transitioning from the F-86 Sabre to the North American F-100 Super Sabre. In July 1966, Lowry Air Force Base was forced to cease all flying operations, resulting in Buckley Air National Guard Base the lone military airfield in the Denver area. Starting in July 1961, Buckley Air National Guard Base provided support for the 451st Strategic Missile Wing's HGM-25A Titan I intercontinental ballistic missiles at Lowry Air Force Base. The replacement of the Titan I with the LGM-25C Titan II and LGM-30 Minuteman resulted in the deactivation of the Titan I silos in 1965. In April 1968, the 14th Tactical Fighter Wing became the first Air National Guard unit to be sent to a combat zone since World War II, deploying to Phan Rang Air Base through April 1969 as part of the Vietnam War.

In spring 1969, the United States Air Force began development on the Defense Support Program ground station, beginning Buckley's space history. The first DSP satellites were launched in November 1970 and the ground station began operations in 1971. The 140th Tactical Fighter Wing transitioned to the LTV A-7 Corsair II in 1973, and in 1992, the 140th Tactical Fighter Wing became the 140th Fighter Wing and began transitioning to the General Dynamics F-16 Fighting Falcon. It later became the 140th Wing in 1955. In December 2001, a new Defense Support Program and Space-Based Infrared System ground station was activated.

After the end of the Cold War, the United States Congress' Base Realignment and Closure committees directed the closure of Lowry Air Force Base in 1991 and Fitzsimons Army Medical Center in 1995. In 1996, Air Force Space Command's 21st Space Wing activated the 821st Space Group to manage support in Denver and consolidate the space warning mission (which had been conducted by the 2nd Space Warning Squadron at Buckley).

=== Buckley Air Force Base (2000–2021) ===
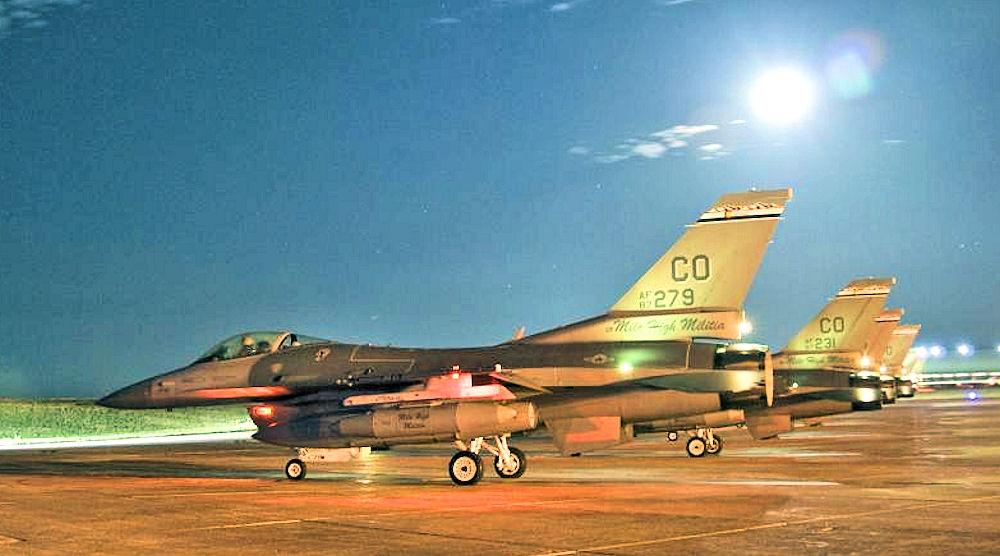
140th Wing F-16C Fighting Falcons at Buckley Air Force Base in 2009

Following the activation of the 821st Space Group in 1996, the space mission at Buckley grew considerably. On 1 October 2000, the Department of the Air Force renamed the base to Buckley Air Force Base and assigned it to Air Force Space Command, with the 821st Space Group responsible for operations. In 2001, the 460th Air Base Wing was activated to manage operations at the base and relieve pressure on the 21st Space Wing. The 821st Space Group was inactivated, while the operational space missions were still controlled by the 21st Space Wing. In 2004, the 460th Air Base Wing became the 460th Space Wing, assuming responsibility for the Defense Support Program and Space-Based Infrared System missions from the 21st Space Wing.

=== Buckley Space Force Base (2021–present) ===
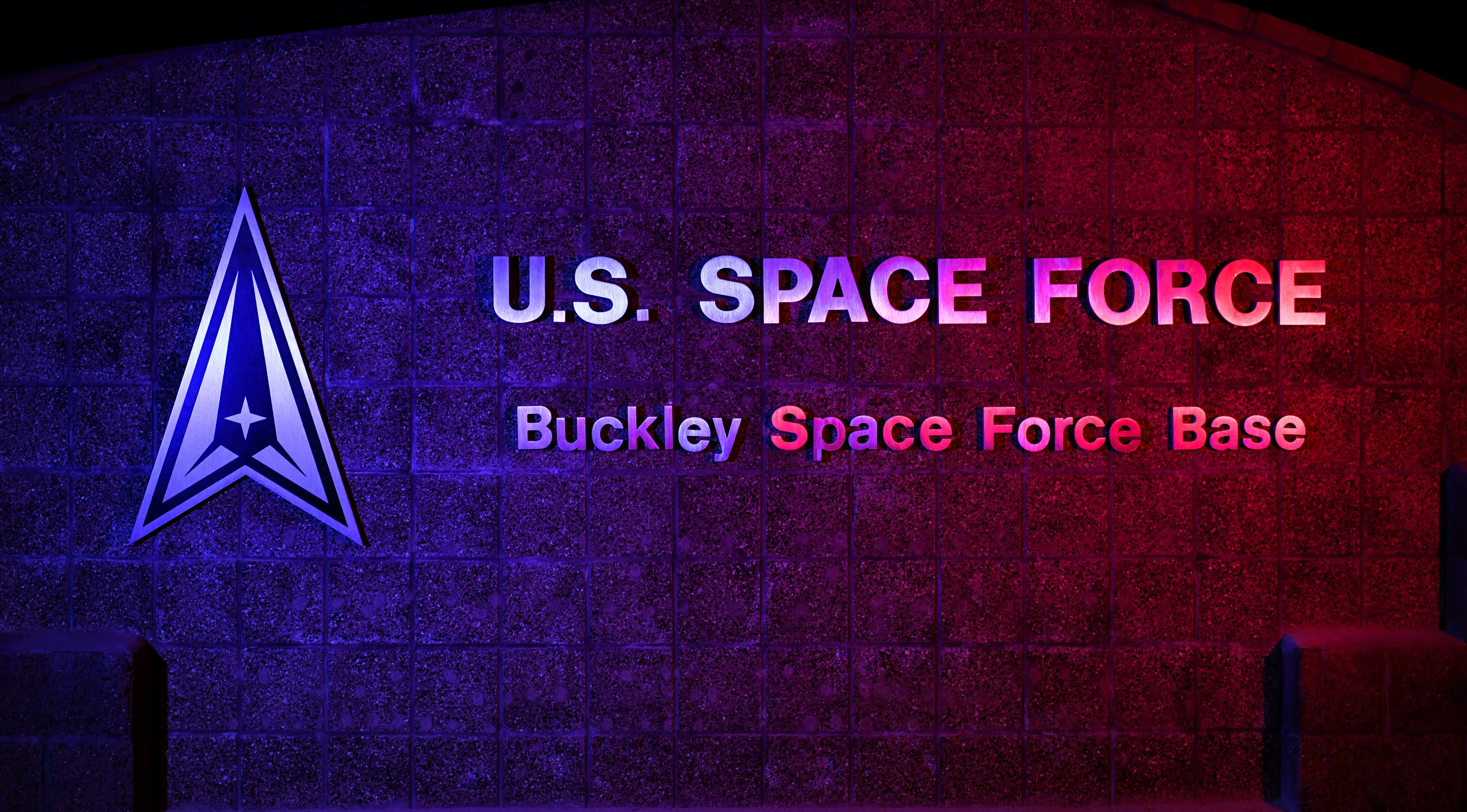
Buckley's updated front entrance at the time of its redesignation as a Space Force installation.

Following the establishment of the United States Space Force, the 460th Space Wing and Buckley Air Force Base's administration transferred from Air Force Space Command to the new service. On 24 July 2020, the 460th Space Wing was inactivated. Base administration was transitioned to Buckley Garrison and the 460th Operations Group became Space Delta 4, combining the space-based missile warning satellites at Buckley and the former 21st Space Wing's network of ground-based missile warning radars. On 4 June 2021, the Buckley Air Force Base was renamed Buckley Space Force Base.

== Units ==
=== United States Space Force ===
As a United States Space Force base, the preponderance of the units at Buckley are from the service.

==== Space Base Delta 2 ====
Space Base Delta 2

Space Base Delta 2 (SBD 2) is responsible for the administration of Buckley Space Force Base under Space Operations Command, taking over the responsibility from the inactivated 460th Space Wing in 2020. It was formerly named Buckley Garrison until being redesignated on 23 May 2022, alongside the inactivation of the 460th Mission Support Group. Space Base Delta 2 also has responsibilities for providing installation support for Cape Cod Space Force Station, Cavalier Space Force Station, and Clear Space Force Station. Space Base Delta 2 supports 3,500 active duty members from every military service, 4,000 National Guard personnel and reservists, four commonwealth international partners, 2,400 civilians, 2,500 contractors, and approximately 88,000 retirees, veterans and dependents combined. Buckley Space Force Base is estimated to contribute $1 billion annually to the local economy.

Space Base Delta 2 is responsible for providing base operating support through security, civil engineer, military/civilian personnel, base services, contracting and logistics functions to 93,000 military, civilian, contractor, retiree, veteran and family members at Buckley Space Force Base along with the bases tenant units in the Front Range area defense community. The 460th Contracting Flight (460 CONF) is responsible for military acquisitions, and is divided into three sub-flights: Infrastructure Support, Base Operation Support, and Plans and Programs. The 460th Security Forces Squadron (460 SFS) is responsible for providing base security, law enforcement, and force protection. The 460th Force Support Squadron (460 FSS) is responsible for military personnel support, manpower management, professional military education support, military and family readiness support, and professional enhancement services, as well as the Buckley Space Force Base honor guard morale, welfare, and recreation programs for Buckley Space Force Base. The 460th Civil Engineer Squadron (460 CES) is responsible for installation engineering, military housing support, environmental engineering, and emergency services. The 460th Logistics Readiness Squadron (460 LRS) is responsible for providing all military logistics support, including vehicles management, traffic management, cargo movement, airlift operations, support agreements, deployment planning and execution, and bulk fuels.

The 460th Medical Group (460 MDG) is divided into two squadrons. The 460th Medical Group is responsible for providing military medicine support, including primary care, flight and operational medicine, dentistry, mental health, public health, physical therapy, optometry, bioenvironmental engineering, medical laboratory, radiology, immunizations, and pharmacy medical support. The 460th Operational Medical Readiness Squadron (460 OMRS) includes six flights: Operational Medicine Flight (Flight Medicine Clinic and Warrior Medicine Clinic), Public Health Flight (including Health Promotions), Bioenvironmental Flight, Optometry Flight, Dental Flight, and Mental Health Flight. The 460th Healthcare Operations Squadron (460 HCOS) consists of seven flights: Family Health Flight (Dependent Care Clinic, Pediatric Clinic, Women's Health Clinic, Radiology, Immunizations, and Physical Therapy), Medical Laboratory Flight, Pharmacy Flight, TRICARE Operations and Patient Administration Flight, Medical Logistics Flight, Resource Management Flight, and Medical Information Systems Flight.

Space Base Delta 2 is composed of the following units at Buckley Space Force Base:
Space Base Delta 2

- 460th Comptroller Squadron (460 CPTS)
- 460th Civil Engineer Squadron (460 CES)
- 460th Contracting Squadron (460 CONS)
- 460th Force Support Squadron (460 FSS)
- 460th Logistics Readiness Squadron (460 LRS)
- 460th Security Forces Squadron (460 SFS)
- 460th Medical Group (460 MDG)
  - 460th Healthcare Operations Squadron (45 HCOS)
  - 460th Operational Medical Readiness Squadron (45 OMRS)

==== Space Delta 4 ====
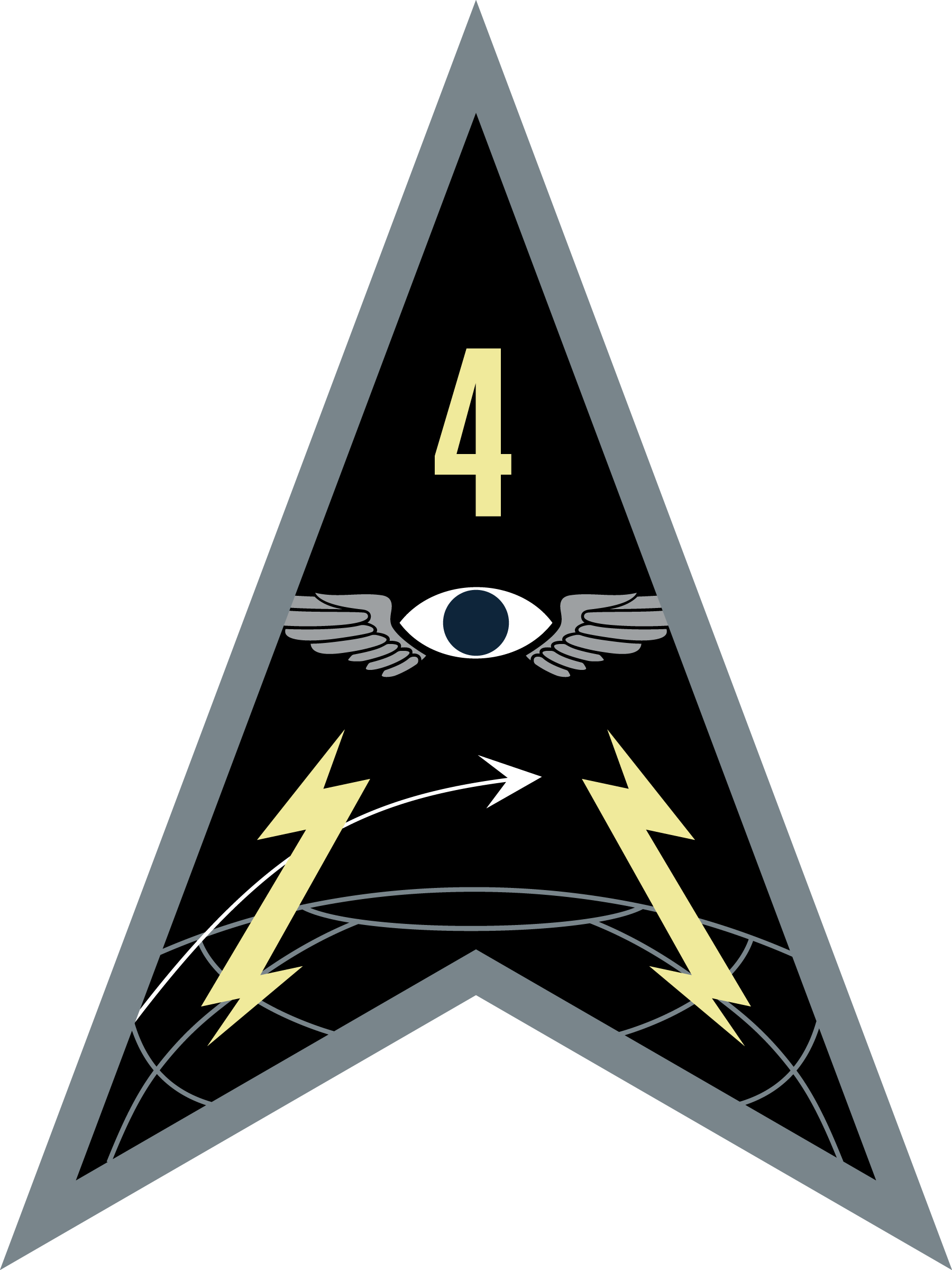
Space Delta 4

Space Delta 4 (DEL 4) is the United States Space Force's missile warning delta and the primary unit at Buckley Space Force Base under Space Operations Command. It was formed from the 460th Operations Group, which managed space-based missile warning satellites, and the 21st Operations Group's ground-based missile warning radars in 2020. Space Delta 4 consists of eight squadrons, one detachment, and one operating location. Four of these are located at Buckley Space Force Base. The 2nd Space Warning Squadron (2 SWS) and 11th Space Warning Squadron (11 SWS) fly the Defense Support Program and Space-Based Infrared System constellations from Buckley Space Force Base, and are responsible for providing missile warning, missile defense, battlespace awareness, and technical intelligence. The 460th Operations Support Squadron (460 OSS) is responsible for providing operational training and certification, tactics development, engineering support, and crew force management for all Space Delta 4 units, while Detachment 1 (DEL 4, DET 1) is responsible for military communications.

Space Delta 4 units not at Buckley Space Force Base include the AN/FPS-132 Upgraded Early Warning Radars operated by the 6th Space Warning Squadron (6 SWS) at Cape Cod Space Force Station, 7th Space Warning Squadron (7 SWS) at Beale Air Force Base, 12th Space Warning Squadron at Pituffik Space Base, 13th Space Warning Squadron (13 SWS) at Clear Air Force Station, and Operating Location–Fylingdales (OL-F) at RAF Fylingdales and the AN/FPQ-16 Perimeter Acquisition Radar Attack Characterization System operated by the 10th Space Warning Squadron (10 SWS) at Cavalier Space Force Station. The 13th Space Warning Squadron also supports the operation of the AN/FPS-108 Cobra Dane at Eareckson Air Station, and both the 7th Space Warning Squadron and 13th Space Warning Squadron support the Missile Defense Agency's Long Range Discrimination Radar at Clear Space Force Station.

Space Delta 4 is composed of the following units at Buckley Space Force Base:
Mission Delta 4 (DEL 4)

- 2nd Space Warning Squadron (2 SWS)
- 11th Space Warning Squadron (11 SWS)
- 460th Operations Support Squadron (460 OSS)
- Detachment 1 (DEL 4, DET 1)

==== Other Space Force units ====
Other units at Buckley Space Force base include Space Delta 6's 64th Cyberspace Squadron and Space Delta 7's Detachment 4, 71st Intelligence, Surveillance, and Reconnaissance Squadron. The 64th Cyberspace Squadron is responsible for defensive cyber operations and Detachment 4, 71 ISRS is responsible for providing intelligence analysis and support to all Space Delta 4 units.

Other Space Force units at Buckley Space Force base include:

- 62nd Cyber Squadron (Space Delta 6)
- Detachment 4, 71st Intelligence, Surveillance and Reconnaissance Squadron (Space Delta 7)

=== United States Air Force ===
==== 140th Wing (Colorado Air National Guard) ====
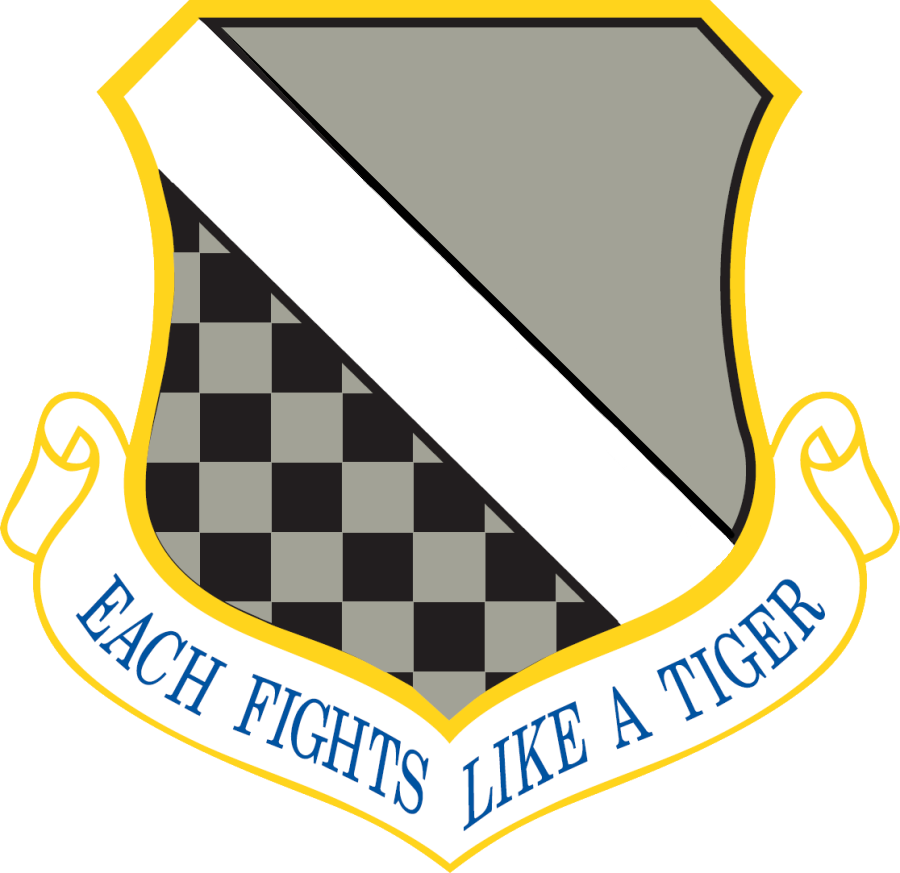
140th Wing

The 140th Wing (140 WG) is the primary unit of the Colorado Air National Guard, consisting of five groups, with four being located at Buckley Space Force Base. The 140th Wing consist of 1600 personnel that fall under three Air Force major commands and Space Force field that provide with fighter, space-based early missile warning and support forces. It consist of the 140th Operations Group, 140th Maintenance Group, 140th Mission Support Group, 140th Medical Group, and the 233rd Space Group (located at Greely Air National Guard Station).

The 140th Operations Group (140 OG) is responsible for flying operations at Buckley Space Force Base and consists of the 120th Fighter Squadron (120 FS), which is equipped with the General Dynamics F-16C Fighting Falcon, and the 140th Operations Support Squadron (140 OSS), which is responsible for airfield management, air traffic control, intelligence, flight records, current operations scheduling, training, control of the Airburst bombing range, weapons and tactics, plans and mobility, and weather forecasting and warning services. The 140th Operations Group is gained by Air Combat Command if activated.

The 140th Maintenance Group (140 MXG) consist of two squadrons and one independent flight. The 140th Maintenance Operations Flight (140 MXOF) provides extensive maintenance analysis data, maintains oversight of wing plans, training, scheduling, and forms documentation for the entire group and manages the Maintenance Operations Center. The 140th Aircraft Maintenance Squadron (140 AMXS) provides intermediate and flight line maintenance. The 140th Maintenance Squadron (140 MXS) is responsible for specialized maintenance of F-16 components, systems and support equipment.

The 140th Mission Support Group (140 MSG) consists of four squadrons and two independent flights. The 140th Force Support Squadron (140 FSS) consists of the Sustainment Services Flight, responsible for lodging, food service, fitness and recreation, Color Guard, mortuary affairs and protocol services, the Manpower and Personnel Flight, responsible for services including military and dependent ID cards, education services and personnel support functions, the Airman and Family Readiness Flight, responsible for emergency assistance and deployment-related support and services, and the Recruiting and Retention office for the Colorado Air National Guard. The 140th Civil Engineer Squadron (140 CES) has a dual mission of providing provide follow-on Prime Base Engineering Emergency Forces and supporting day-to-day operations of base facilities, as well as Environmental, Emergency Management and Explosive Ordnance Disposal (EOD) functions. The 140th Logistics Readiness Squadron (140 LRS) consists of the Fuels Management Flight, Resource Control Center, Materiel Management Flight, and the Readiness Flight. The 140th Security Forces Squadron (140 SFS) is responsible for the safety and security of assigned and transient aircraft, Anti-Terrorism/Force Protection programs and provides Combat Arms Training for all Air Expeditionary Forces assigned to the 140th Wing. The 140th Communications Flight (140 CF) provides communications and information capabilities supporting the 140th Wing. The 240th Civil Engineer Flight (240 CEF) consists of engineers, administration specialists, and fire fighters that design facilities, program, conduct wartime engineer resource management, and are gained by Pacific Air Forces if activated.

The 140th Medical Group (140 MDG) consists of the 140th Medical Squadron (140 MS), which serves as a clinic in support of the 140th Wing by providing physical examinations, immunizations, bioenvironmental engineering, and occupational health management programs. In addition, the 140th MDS also conducts Air Transportable Hospital mission taskings and flight surgeon support to all wing deployments.

Located at Greely Air National Guard Station, the 233rd Space Group (233 SG) consists of the 137th Space Warning Squadron (137 SWS), 233rd Space Communications Squadron (233 SCS), 233rd Security Forces Squadron (233 SFS), and 233rd Logistics Readiness Flight (233 LRF). It operates the Defense Support Program's Mobile Ground Station and is gained by Space Operations Command.

The 140th Wing is composed of the following units at Buckley Space Force Base:
140th Wing

- 140th Operations Group
  - 120th Fighter Squadron
  - 140th Operations Support Squadron
- 140th Maintenance Group
  - 140th Aircraft Maintenance Squadron
  - 140th Maintenance Operations Flight
  - 140th Maintenance Squadron
- 140th Mission Support Group
  - 140th Civil Engineering Squadron
  - 140th Communications Flight
  - 140th Force Support Squadron
  - 140th Logistics Readiness Squadron
  - 140th Security Forces Squadron
  - 240th Civil Engineer Flight
- 140th Medical Group
  - 140th Medical Squadron

==== Air Reserve Personnel Center ====
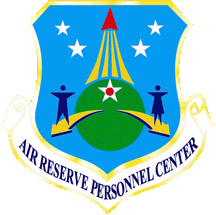
Air Reserve Personnel Center

The Air Reserve Personnel Center (ARPC) is a major command direct reporting unit to Air Force Reserve Command and provides support to both the Air Force Reserve and Air National Guard. It consists of four directorates: the Directorate of Assignments (DPA), which facilities Air Force reserve developmental boards, the Directorate of Total Force Services (DPT), which processes retirements, evaluations, awards and decorations, and DD 214s, the Directorate of Future Operations and Integration (DPX) which is responsible for the internal communication systems that enable technicians to process personnel actions, and the Promotion Board Secretariat which conducts officer promotion boards.

==== 710th Operations Group ====
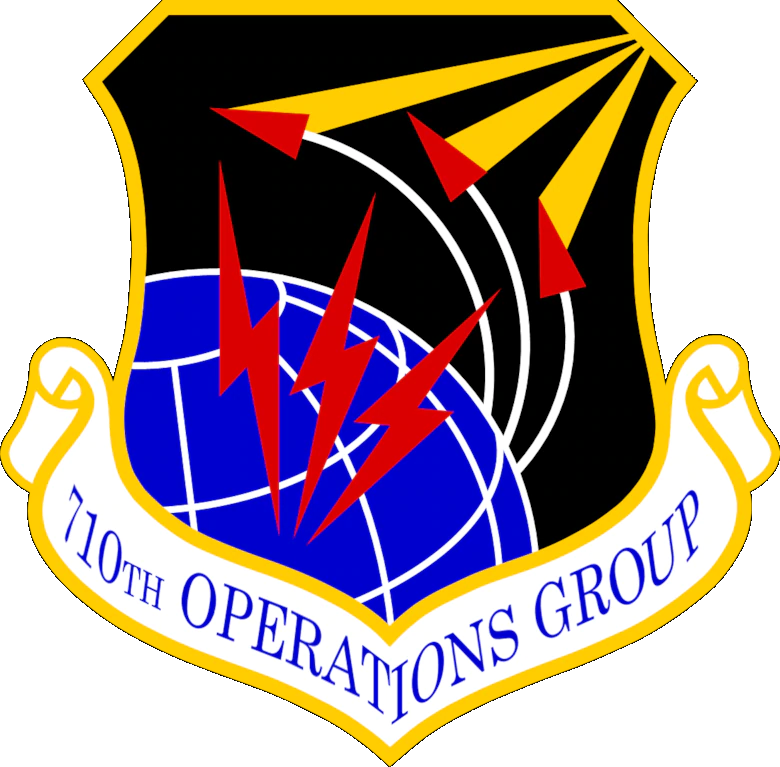
710th Operations Group

The 710th Operations Group (710 OG), part of Air Force Reserve Command's 310th Space Wing is headquartered at Buckley Space Force Base. The 710th Operations Group consists of the 380th Space Control Squadron (380 SPCS), the reserve associate unit to the 16th Space Control Squadron at Peterson Space Force Base under Space Delta 3, the 42nd Combat Training Squadron (42 CTS), the reserve associate unit for the 319th Combat Training Squadron at Peterson Space Force Base under the Space Training and Readiness Delta (Provisional), the 4th Space Warning Squadron (4 SWS), the reserve associate unit for the 11th Space Warning Squadron at Buckley Space Force Base under Space Delta 4 flying the Space-Based Infrared System, the 8th Space Warning Squadron (8 SWS), the reserve associate unit for the 2nd Space Warning Squadron at Buckley Space Force Base under Space Delta 4 flying the Space-Based Infrared System, and the 710th Operations Support Flight (710 OSF) which is composed of 4 flights that provide instructor training, mission qualification training, advanced training, crew force management, weapons and tactics training and comprehensive intel support for all 710th Operations Group units.

The 710th Operations Group is composed of the following units at Buckley Space Force Base:
710th Operations Group

- 4th Space Warning Squadron
- 8th Space Warning Squadron
- 710th Operations Support Flight

==== 544th Intelligence, Surveillance and Reconnaissance Group ====
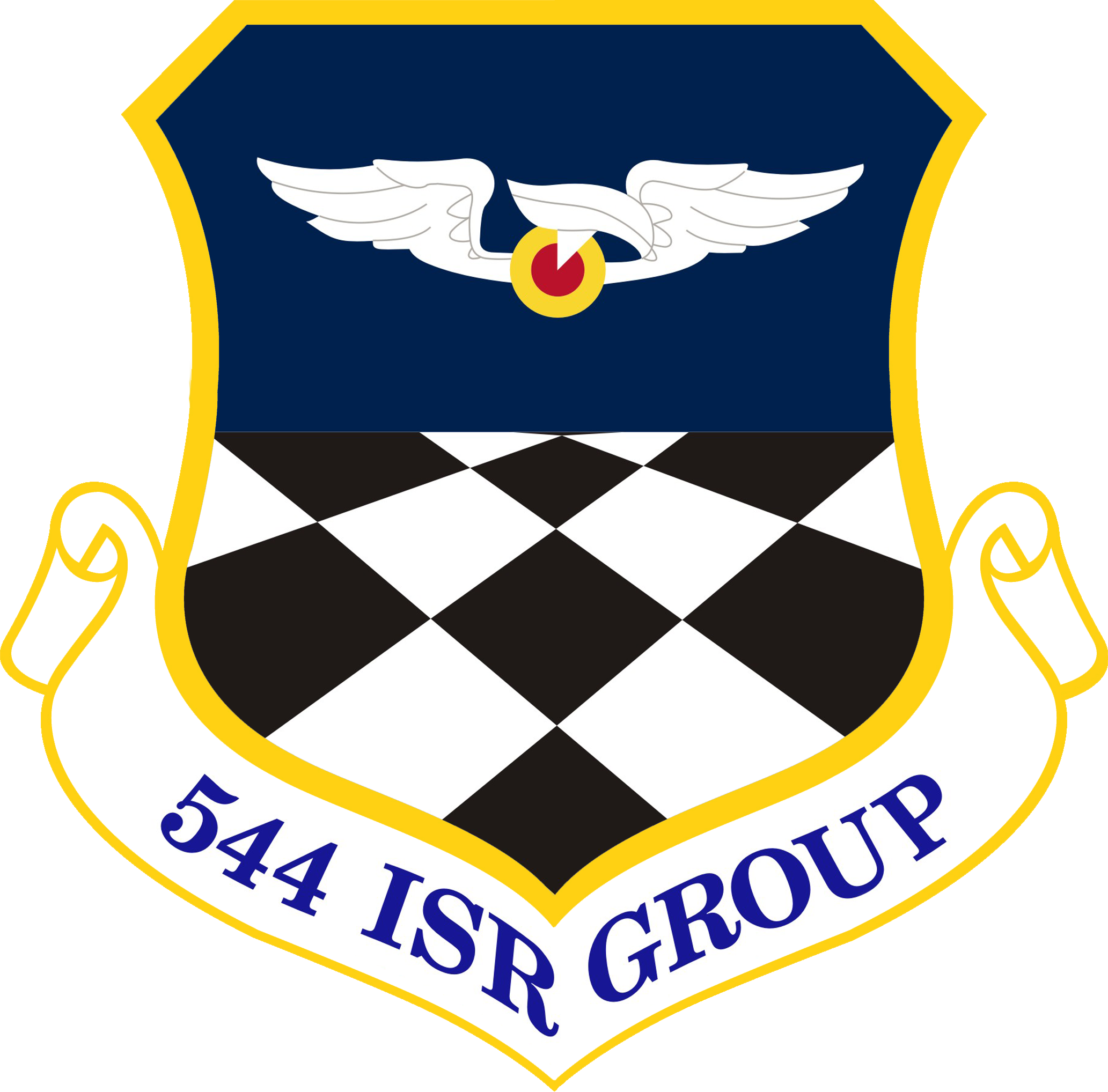
544th ISR Group

The 544th Intelligence, Surveillance and Reconnaissance Group, part of Air Combat Command, is a force provider to the Aerospace Data Facility-Colorado. The 544th Intelligence, Surveillance and Reconnaissance Group was re-established on Sept 27th, 2022 to delivers global, space-related information to national agencies and warfighting commands, provides policy guidance and functional assistance to assigned organizations, and develops mission-based facilities and communication.

The 544th Intelligence, Surveillance and Reconnaissance Group is composed of the following units at Buckley Space Force Base:
544th Intelligence, Surveillance and Reconnaissance Group

- 18th Intelligence Squadron
- 26th Intelligence Squadron
- 566th Intelligence Squadron

=== Joint organizations ===
==== Aerospace Data Facility-Colorado ====
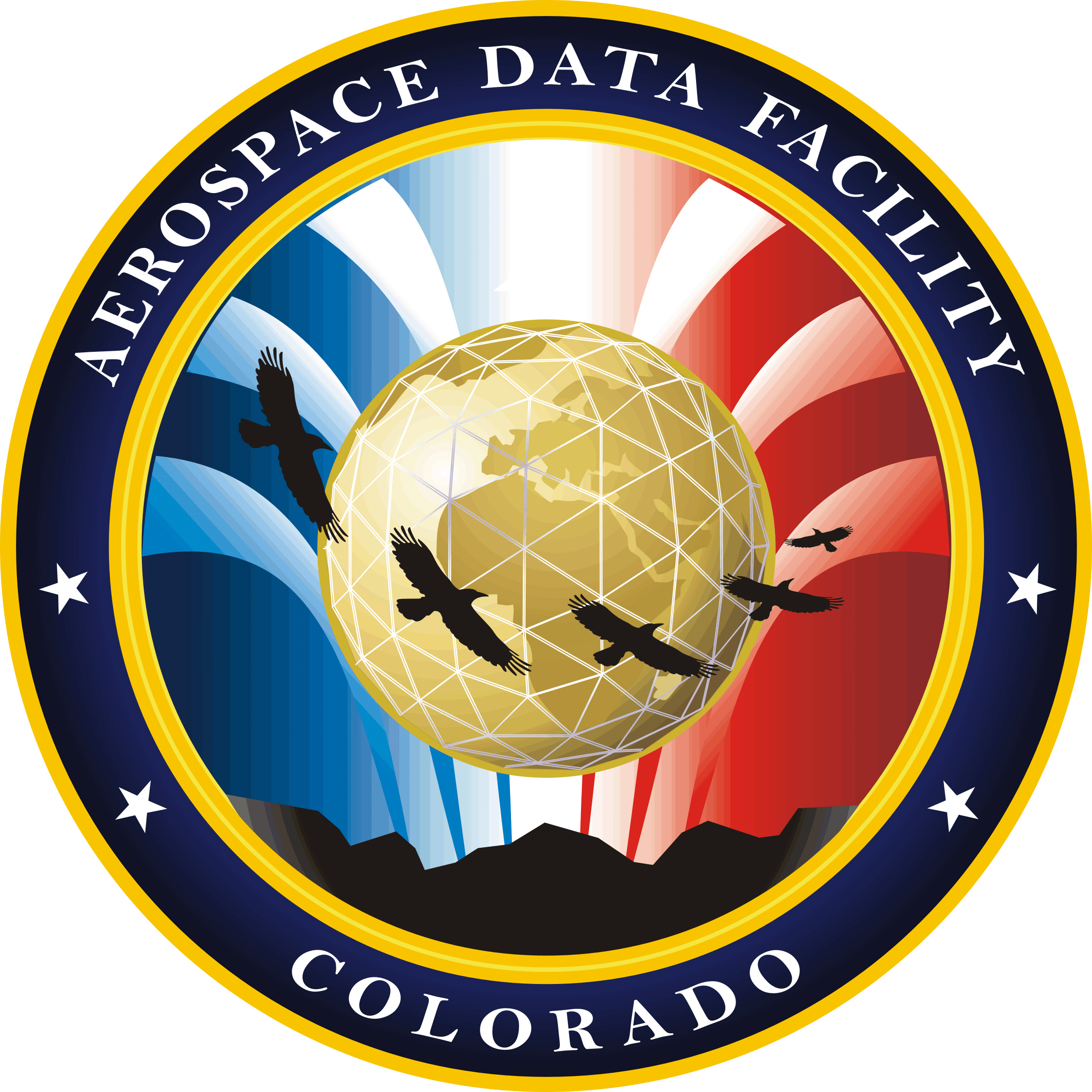
Aerospace Data Facility–Colorado

The National Reconnaissance Office's Aerospace Data Facility-Colorado (ADF–C) is a multi-mission ground station responsible for supporting worldwide defense operations and multi-agency collection, analysis, reporting, and dissemination of intelligence information. It provides data to defense, intelligence, and civil agencies supporting the U.S. Government and its Allies.

==== Joint Overhead Persistent Infrared Center ====
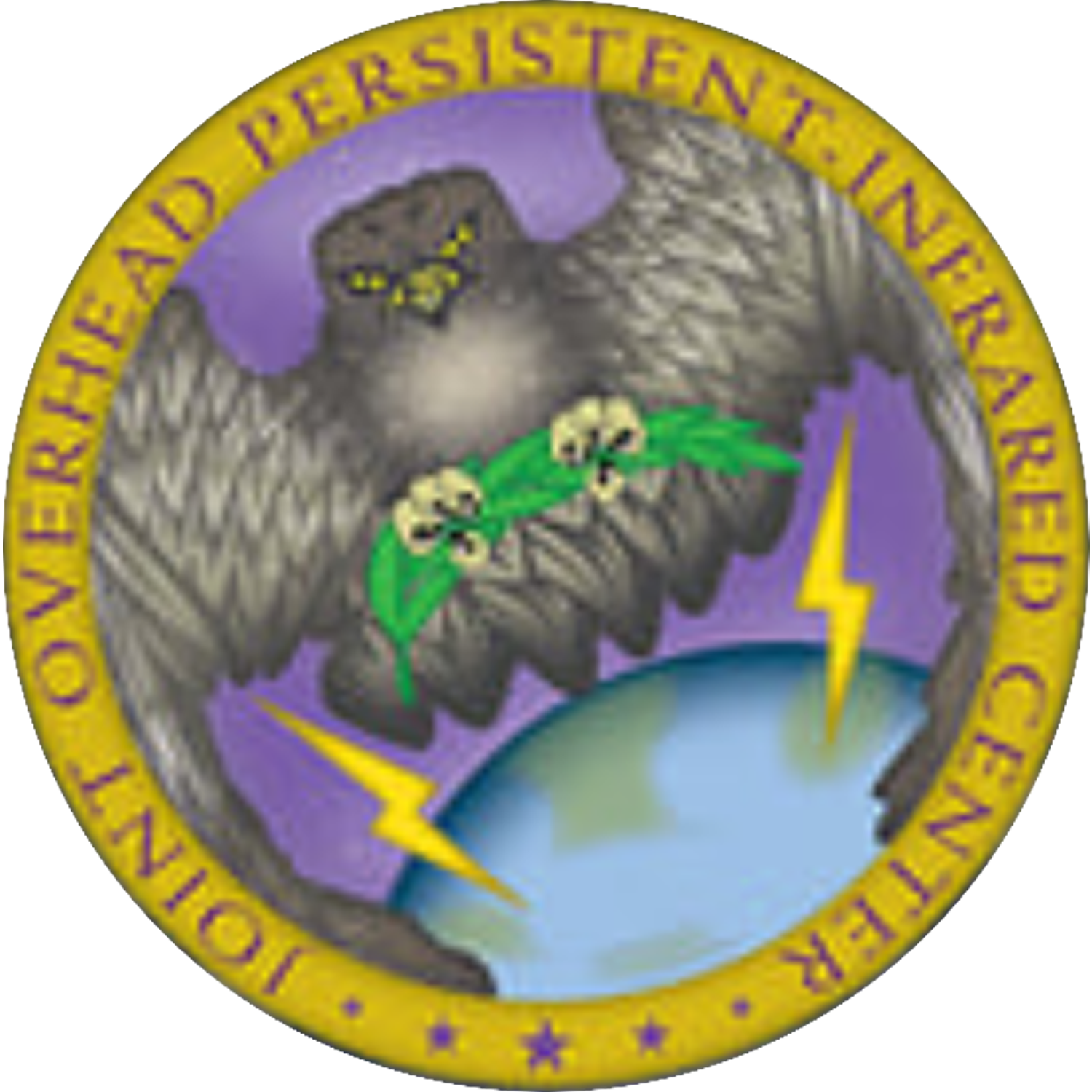
Joint Overhead Persistent Infrared Center

The Joint Overhead Persistent Infrared Center (JOPC) is a joint organization comprising National Geospatial-Intelligence Agency (NGA) and the United States Space Command's Combined Force Space Component Command personnel. The Joint Overhead Persistent Infrared Center conducts integrated mission management to optimize the OPIR enterprise for national-level decision makers, warfighters, and the Intelligence Community. The JOPC plans, tasks, monitors, and assesses OPIR operations and serves as the focal point for 24/7 OPIR reach back and customer support. The JOPC provides tailored support to each of the Combatant Commands (COCOMs) and partner Coalition operations centers including the Australian Space Operations Center (AUSSpOC), Canadian Space Operations Center (CANSpOC), and United Kingdom Space Operations Center (UKSpOC).

==== Joint Force Headquarters-Colorado ====
Joint Force Headquarters-Colorado (JFHQ-CO) is commanded by the Adjutant General of Colorado and consists of the Director of Joint Staff, Ground Forces Component Commander, Air Forces Component Commander, Space Forces Component Command, and commands and controls the Colorado Army National Guard, Colorado Air National Guard, and any other assigned forces. JFHQ-CO provides trained and equipped forces to accomplish federal and state missions, and on the order of the president of the United States or governor of Colorado, executes assigned missions and provides support and/or command and control for other forces, such as DoD elements and agencies.

=== United States Army ===
==== 743rd Military Intelligence Battalion ====
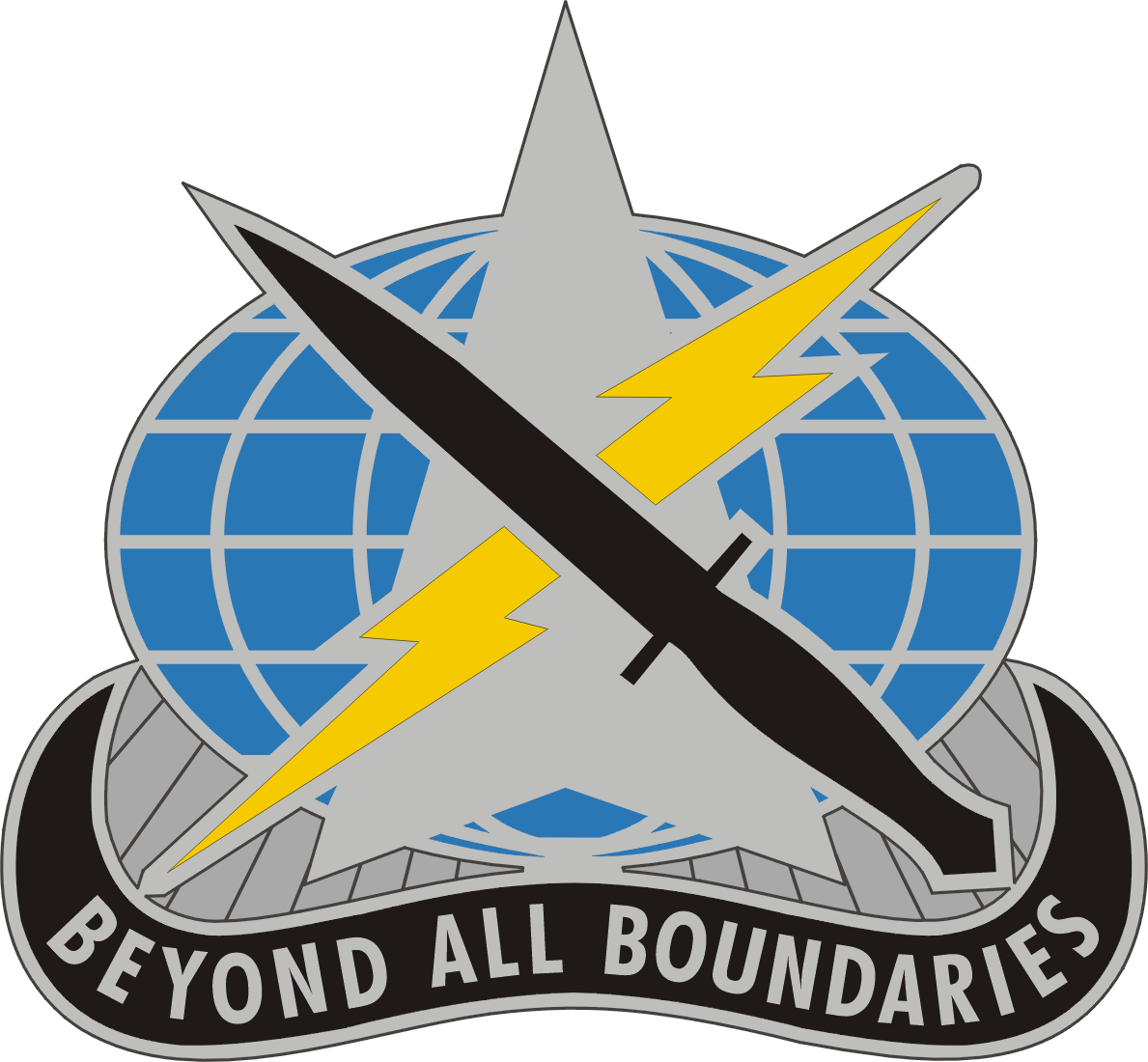
743rd Military Intelligence Battalion

The 743rd Military Intelligence Battalion, organized under the 704th Military Intelligence Brigade conducts worldwide SIGINT operations to enhance battle command and provide information advantage to Army, Joint, and Combined Forces, as well as National Consumers.

==== Colorado Army National Guard ====
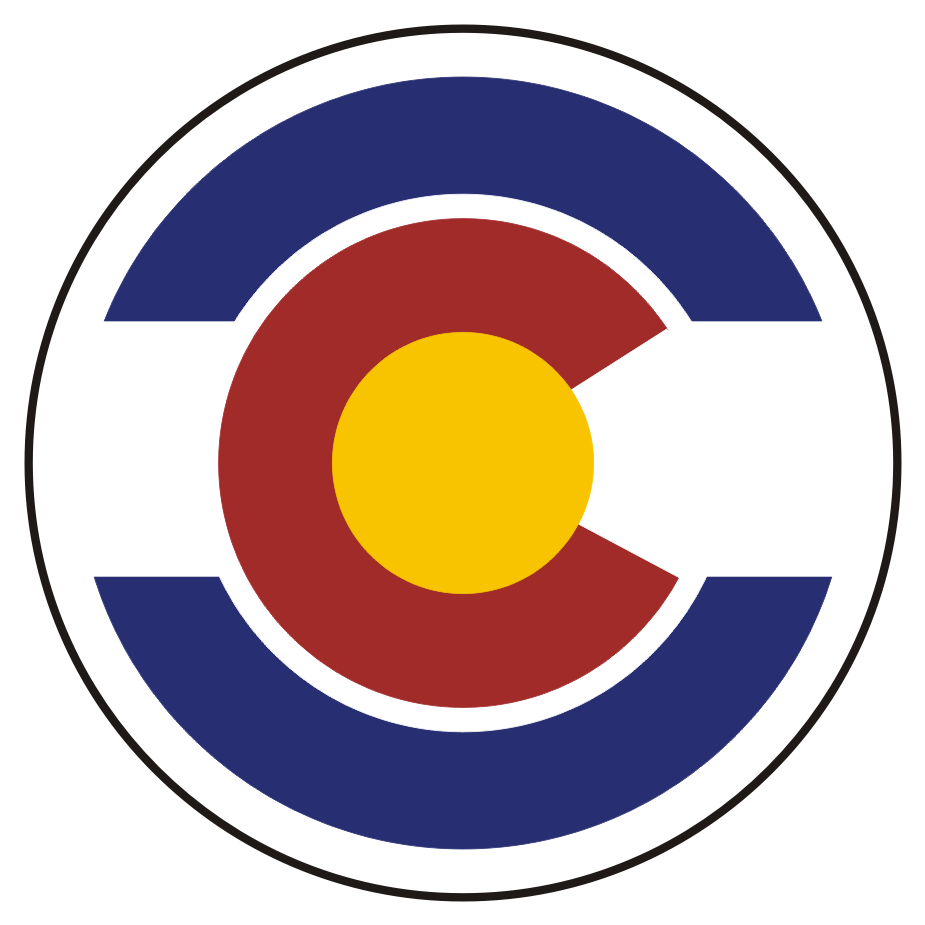
Colorado Army National Guard

The Colorado Army National Guard units at Buckley Space Force Base include the headquarters of the 169th Field Artillery Brigade (in addition to its 540th Network Support Company and 86th Military Intelligence Battalion), the Army Aviation Support Facility (AASF) and 2-135 Aviation Battalion (General Support), Colorado Army National Guard Medical Command, and Special Operations Detachment-Korea. The AASF supports a general support aviation battalion (GSAB), a MEDEVAC detachment, a security and support (S&S) company, and an operational support airlift detachment including over 430 soldiers and 24 aircraft.

Colorado Army National Guard units at Buckley Space Force Base include:

- Army Aviation Support Facility (AASF)
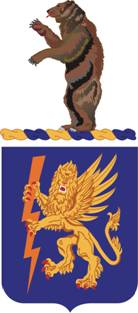
- 2nd Battalion, 135th Aviation Regiment (General Support)
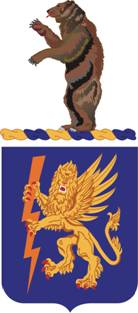
  - Higher Headquarters Company, 2nd Battalion, 135th Aviation Regiment (General Support)
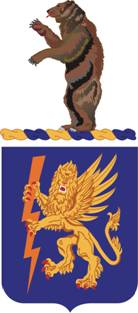
  - Detachment 1, Company B, 2nd Battalion, 135th Aviation Regiment (General Support)
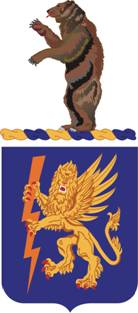
  - Company D, 2nd Battalion, 135th Aviation Regiment (General Support)
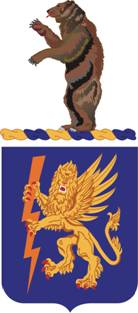
  - Company E, 2nd Battalion, 135th Aviation Regiment (General Support)
  - Company A, 2nd Battalion, 238th Aviation Regiment
  - Detachment 1, Company E, 2nd Battalion, 238th Aviation Regiment
  - Detachment 3, Higher Headquarters Company, 1st Battalion, 168th Aviation Regiment
  - Detachment 1, Company C, 1st Battalion, 168th Aviation Regiment (MEDIVAC)
  - Detachment 3, Company D, 1st Battalion, 168th Aviation Regiment
  - Detachment 3, Company E, 1st Battalion, 168th Aviation Regiment
  - Detachment 1, 131st Aviation Intermediate Maintenance Company
  - Detachment, Company D, 3rd Battalion, 140th Aviation Regiment
- Headquarters, 169th Field Artillery Brigade
  - 540th Network Support Company (under 147th Brigade Support Battalion)
  - 86th Military Intelligence Company (under 147th Brigade Support Battalion)
- Company D, 572nd Engineer Battalion, 86th Infantry Brigade Combat Team (Mountain), Military Intelligence
- Colorado Army National Guard Medical Command
- Special Operations Detachment-Korea (Airborne)

=== United States Marine Corps ===
United States Marine Corps units at Buckley Space Force base include Combat Logistics Battalion 453, Quebec Battery 5-14 Marines, Alpha Company, Marine Cryptologic Support Battalion, and Bravo Company, Marine Corps Forces Reserve Intelligence Support Battalion. Combat Logistics Battalion 453 (CLB 453) is a reserve logistics battalion under Combat Logistics Regiment 4, 4th Marine Logistics Group, Marine Corps Reserve. Quebec Battery is a reserve artillery company that consists of forward observers, the fire direction center, and gun crews manning the M198 howitzer under 5th Battalion, 14th Marine Regiment, 4th Marine Division, Marine Corps Reserve. Company A, Marine Cryptologic Support Battalion's mission is to provide trained, deployable Marines to support operations at Aerospace Data Facility-Colorado. The company maintains personnel readiness to augment Radio Battalions or other operational deployments as required. Bravo Company, Intelligence Support Battalion, Marine Forces Reserve provides task-organized detachments of intelligence personnel to augment active component elements, joint commands, and national agencies.

Marine Corps units at Buckley Space Force base include:

- Combat Logistics Battalion 453, Combat Logistics Regiment 4, 4th Marine Logistics Group, Marine Forces Reserve
- Quebec Battery, 5th Battalion, 14th Marines, 14th Marine Regiment, 4th Marine Division, Marine Forces Reserve
- Company A, Marine Cryptologic Support Battalion
- Bravo Company, Intelligence Support Battalion, Marine Forces Reserve

=== United States Navy ===
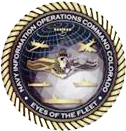
Navy Information Operations Command-Colorado

United States Navy units at Buckley Space Force Base include the Navy Information Operations Command-Colorado and Navy Operations Support Center-Denver. The Navy Information Operations Command-Colorado was originally activated on 1 November 1995 as Naval Security Group Activity Denver and assumed its current name in December 2005 and is part of United States Fleet Cyber Command. The Navy Operations Support Center-Denver is descended from the original Naval Air Reserve Station–Denver mission.

Navy units at Buckley Space Force base include:

- Navy Information Operations Command-Colorado (United States Fleet Cyber Command)
- Navy Operations Support Center-Denver (United States Navy Reserve)

=== United States Coast Guard ===
The United States Coast Guard Cryptologic Unit-Colorado (CGCU-Colorado) was commissioned at Buckley Space Force Base on 3 October 2007 and conduct technical training and analysis of the maritime domain in support of tactical and operational fleet commands, the Coast Guard Intelligence enterprise, and combatant commanders. In conjunction with their daily analytical duties, members of the unit simultaneously develop, train and refine their cryptologic skills to support future afloat operations in the Coast Guard.

== Base assignment and major units ==
Name	Military service	Assigned command	Higher headquarters/ garrison	Major units
Demolition Bombing Range–Lowry Auxiliary Field (1938–14 June 1941)	United States Army	United States Army Air Corps	Lowry Field	Air Corps Technical School (1938–26 March 1941)
Buckley Field (14 June 1941 – 28 September 1947)	United States Army	United States Army Air Forces	Lowry Field	Air Corps Technical Training Command (26 March 1941 – 1 November 1941); Fourth Technical Training District (1 November 1941 – 31 August 1943); Western Technical Training Command (31 August 1943 – 15 October 1945); Army Air Forces Training Command (15 October 1945–June 1946)
Naval Air Station Denver (28 September 1947 – 18 April 1960)	United States Navy	Naval Air Reserve Command		86th Fighter Wing (3 July 1946 – 31 October 1950); 140th Fighter Wing (31 October 1950 – 12 April 1951); 140th Fighter-Bomber Wing (12 April 1951 – 1 July 1955); 140th Fighter-Interceptor Wing (1 July 1955 – 1 July 1957); 140th Air Defense Wing (1 July 1957–)
Buckley Air National Guard Base (18 April 1960 – 1 October 2000)	United States Air Force	Air National Guard	140th Air Defense Wing (–1 January 1961); 140th Tactical Fighter Wing (1 January 1961 – 15 March 1992); 140th Fighter Wing (15 March 1992 – 1 July 1995); 140th Wing (15 March 1992–)	2nd Space Communications Squadron (1 May 1992 – 1 May 1993); 2nd Space Warning Squadron (1 May 1993–); 821st Space Group (1996–)
Buckley Air Force Base (1 October 2000 – 4 June 2021)	United States Air Force	Air Force Space Command	821st Space Group (1 October 2000 – 1 October 2001) 460th Air Base Wing (1 October 2001 – 19 August 2004); 460th Space Wing (19 August 2004 – 24 July 2020)	460th Operations Group (19 August 2004 – 24 July 2020); Aerospace Data Facility-Colorado; 140th Wing
Buckley Space Force Base (4 June 2021–present)	United States Space Force	Space Force Combat Forces Command	Space Base Delta 2	Space Delta 4 Aerospace Data Facility-Colorado 140th Wing

== See also ==
- List of United States Space Force installations
