= 4th Space Warning Squadron =

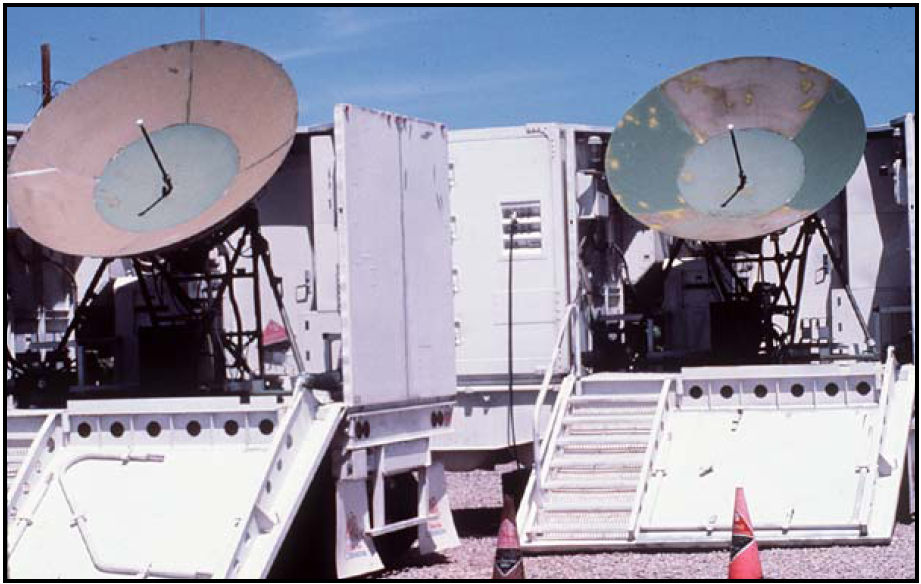
- Mobile communication antennas at Holloman AFB
- Active: 1992-1997; 2019-present
- Country: United States
- Branch: United States Air Force
- Role: Missile Warning
- Motto(s): Cavete Vos Qui Infranos; (Latin: "Beware You Who Are Below Us")
- Decorations: Air Force Outstanding Unit Award

Insignia
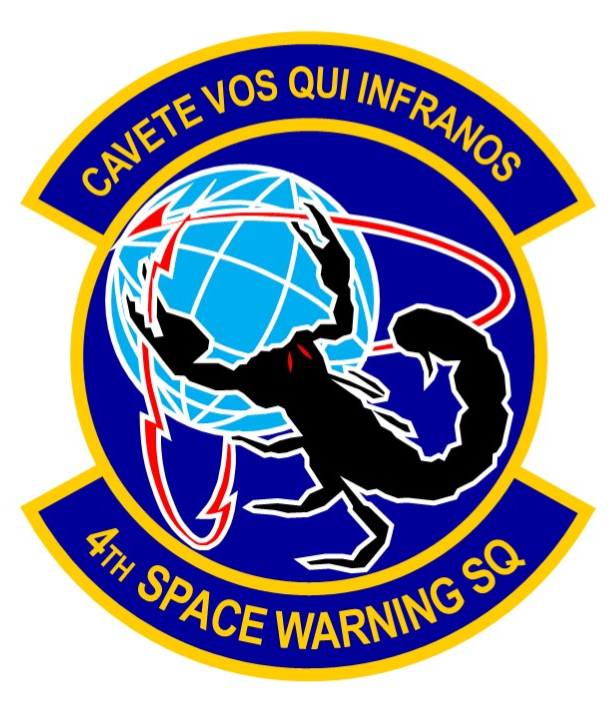
- 4th Space Warning Squadron emblem (approved 2 March 1995) (Note: Heraldic description: azure, a globe in dexter chief celeste gridlined of the first, overall a silhouette of a scorpion sable fimbriated argent and grasping in its pincers an orbital ring fesswise charged with a flight symbol and an orbital ring of a lightning flash palewise both enfilling the globe gules; all within a diminished bordure or.)

The 4th Space Warning Squadron is an active United States Air Force Reserve Command unit, formerly located at Holloman Air Force Base, New Mexico, and now located at Buckley Space Force Base. The unit was activated on 3 August 2019. It was previously activated in May 1992 as the 4th Space Communications Squadron, when it took over the mission and personnel of the 4th Satellite Communications Squadron, before being inactivated in March 1996. The squadron's primary mission is to provide mobile Defense Support Program support in case of hostilities.

== Mission ==
The squadron provided worldwide missile warning, space launch and detection in the event of an attack against the United States.

== History ==
The 4th Space Warning Squadron was activated on 15 May 1992, when it took over the mobile Defense Support Program (DSP) satellite mission which had been performed since 1983 at Holloman Air Force Base, New Mexico by the 1025th Satellite Communications Squadron, Mobile (Note: The 1025th was designated by Air Force Space Command and activated on 1 October 1983 and was assigned directly to Space Command, then to the 1st Space Wing. It was inactivated on 1 August 1986, when its mission, personnel and equipment were transferred to the 4th Satellite Communications Squadron, Mobile.) and the 4th Satellite Communications Squadron, Mobile. (Note: The 4th AACS Squadron, Mobile was activated at Elmendorf Air Force Base on 16 February 1954, assigned to the 1804th AACS Group and inactivated on 18 December 1957. Mueller, p. 163 (dates at Elmendorf). It was disbanded on 15 June 1983, but reconstituted as the 4th Satellite Communications Squadron, Mobile and activated on 1 August 1986, when it took over the assets of the inactivating 1025th Satellite Communications Squadron, Mobile. It was inactivated on 15 May 1992, being replaced by the 4th Space Communications Squadron. Fifteen days later it was activated as the 4th Communications Squadron at Seymour Johnson Air Force Base, North Carolina and is still active there.)

The squadron employed the Air Force's only strategic survivable, mobile ground system to receive early warning missile attack data. The 4th provided survivable and endurable missile warning detection to the National Command Authority and had the ability to survive and operate through all phases of trans/post attack. Unlike fixed units, the 4th was designed to be mobile, and could deploy to any location in the world. In addition, the DSP satellites provided immediate, worldwide missile warning, space launch, and nuclear detonation detection.

The squadron mission was transferred to the 137th Space Warning Squadron of the Colorado Air National Guard in Greeley, Colorado in fall 1997.

== Lineage ==
- Constituted as the 4th Space Communications Squadron on 1 May 1992

Activated on 15 May 1992
Redesignated 4th Space Warning Squadron on 16 October 1992
Inactivated c. 30 September 1997
Activated on 3 August 2019

=== Assignments ===
- 310th Space Wing, 3 August 2019 - present
- 21st Space Wing, 15 May 1992 – c. 30 September 1997

=== Stations ===
- Buckley Space Force Base, Colorado, 3 August 2019 - present
- Holloman Air Force Base, New Mexico, 15 May 1992 – c. 30 September 1997

== Commanders ==
- Lt Col Donald P. Knight (c. 1996)
- Lt Col Jeremy Cotton (2022 - 2024)
- Lt Col Meagan M. Tovado (2024 - Present)

=== Awards and campaigns ===
Award streamer	Award	Dates	Notes
	Air Force Outstanding Unit Award	1 October 1992-30 September 1994	4th Space Communications Squadron (later 4th Space Warning Squadron)
	Air Force Outstanding Unit Award	1 October 1995-1 March 1996	4th Space Warning Squadron
