= 86th Fighter Wing (Air National Guard) =

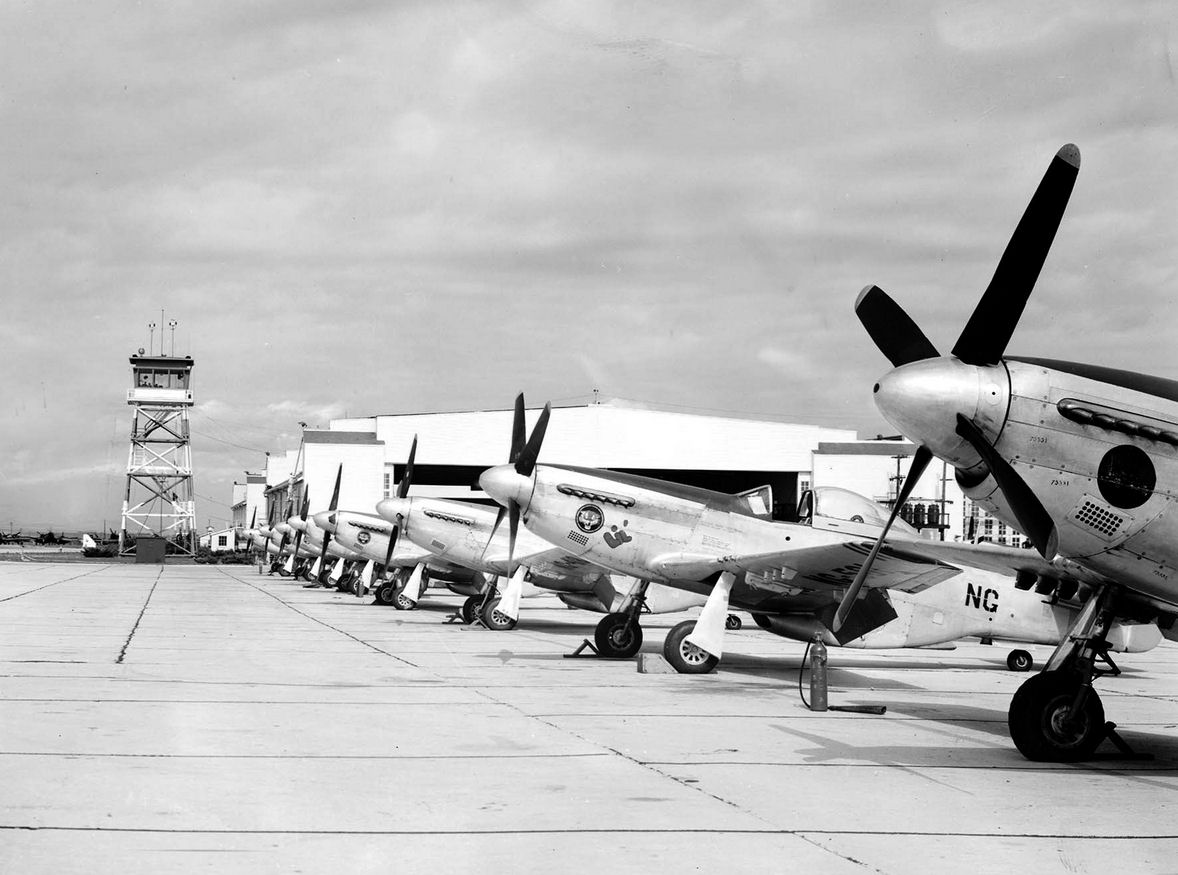
- F-51 Mustangs of the 120th Fighter Squadron, Colorado Air National Guard, November 1946. The 120th was the first federally recognized Air National Guard unit in the United States.
- Active: 1943–1946; 1946-1950
- Country: United States
- Branch: United States Air Force
- Type: Wing
- Role: Command and Control
- Part of: Colorado Air National Guard

The 86th Fighter Wing (86 FW) is a disbanded unit of the United States Air Force, last stationed at Buckley Field, Denver, Colorado. It was withdrawn from the Colorado Air National Guard (CO ANG) and inactivated on 31 October 1950.

This wing is not related to the United States Air Force 86th Fighter Wing that was Constituted on 1 July 1948 and activated in Germany the same day by the United States Air Forces in Europe.

== History ==
=== World War II ===
Activated as an intermediate echelon organization for Fifth Air Force in late 1943.

From May 1944 to August 1945, it commanded various groups that were attached for brief periods in the Southwest Pacific Area. After the end of hostilities, the wing became responsible for establishing and operating an aircraft warning system in the Philippine Islands.

The unit was inactivated on 15 March 1946.

=== Air National Guard ===
Allocated to the Colorado Air National Guard to command Colorado ANG units as well as others in the Rocky Mountain region (Idaho, Montana, Wyoming, and New Mexico). Extended federal recognition and activated on 3 July 1946.

At the end of October 1950, the Air National Guard converted to the wing-base (Hobson Plan) organization. As a result, the wing was withdrawn from the Colorado ANG and was inactivated on 31 October 1950. The 140th Fighter Wing was established by the National Guard Bureau, allocated to the state of Colorado, recognized and activated 1 November 1950; assuming the personnel, equipment and mission of the inactivated 86th Fighter Wing.

=== Lineage ===
- Constituted as 86th Fighter Wing on 19 November 1943

Activated on 1 December 1943
Inactivated on 15 March 1946.

- Allotted to the Colorado ANG on 24 May 1946

Extended federal recognition and activated on 3 July 1946
Inactivated, and returned to the control of the Department of the Air Force, on 31 October 1950

- Disbanded on 15 June 1983

=== Assignments ===
- Fourth Air Force, 1 December 1943
- Fifth Air Force, 1 May 1944 – 15 March 1946

Attached to: 308th Bombardment Wing, 16 January – 15 March 1946.

- Colorado Air National Guard, 3 July 1946 – 31 October 1950

=== Components ===
==== World War II ====
- 8th Fighter Group: 1 May 1944 – 16 August 1945
- 49th Fighter Group: 1 May 1944 – 9 January 1945
- 58th Fighter Group: 1 May – 25 August 1944

==== Colorado Air National Guard ====
- 140th Fighter Group, 3 July 1946 – 31 October 1950
- 186th Fighter Squadron, 27 June 1947 – 31 October 1950 (Montana ANG)
- 187th Fighter Squadron, 11 August 1946 – 31 October 1950 (Wyoming ANG)
- 188th Fighter Squadron, 7 July 1947 – 31 October 1950 (New Mexico ANG)
- 190th Fighter Squadron, 13 October 1946 – 31 October 1950 (Idaho ANG)

=== Stations ===
- March Field, California, 1 December 1943 – 25 March 1944
- Finschhafen Airport, New Guinea, 1 May 1944
- Middleburg Airfield, New Guinea, 4 August 1944
- Sansapor Airfield, New Guinea, 19 August 1944
- San Marcelino Airfield, Luzon, Philippines, 16 January 1945 – 15 March 1946.
- Buckley Field, Denver, Colorado, 3 July 1946 – 31 October 1950
