= Gregory T. White =

U.S. Air Force general

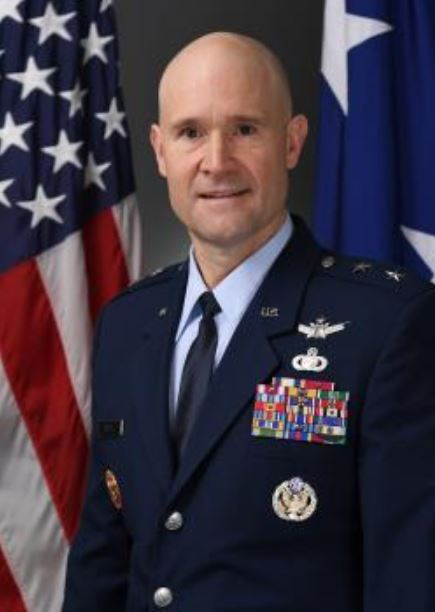
- Official portrait, 2022
- Military career
- Allegiance: United States
- Branch: United States Air Force
- Service years: 1990–2023
- Rank: Major General
- Commands: 233rd Space Group; 137th Space Warning Squadron
- Conflicts: Gulf War; Iraq War
- Awards: Legion of Merit (2)

Gregory T. White is a retired United States Air Force major general who last served as the Director of Space Operations of the National Guard Bureau from 2020 to 2023. He previously served as the Air National Guard assistant to the director of operations and communications of the Air Force Space Command from 2018 to 2020.

Military offices
New title	Director of Space Operations of the National Guard Bureau; 2020–2023	Succeeded by Edward L. Vaughan
