= Rocky Mountain EAA Regional Fly-In =

- Genre: Air show
- Dates: June
- Venue: Front Range Airport
- Locations: Aurora, Colorado
- Country: U.S.A.
- Organizer: Experimental Aircraft Association

The Rocky Mountain EAA Regional Fly-In is an annual gathering of aviation enthusiasts held each summer at Front Range Airport near Aurora, Colorado. It is held just prior to the national fly-in held at Oshkosh, typically in mid to late June, and serves the same purpose specific to the Rocky Mountain region. Likewise, it hosted by the Experimental Aircraft Association and therefore the focus is on kit-built aircraft, although enthusiasts and interests concerning general aviation and military aircraft are also in-force. Because the Rocky Mountain EAA Fly-In is region-specific and lacks the national attention of the Oshkosh event, the focus tends to lean more towards the general attendees and the aircraft they had brought with them, rather than on vendors, manufacturers and aviation and national celebrities such as Burt Rutan (although their presence is still heavily felt).

In addition to general attendees who happen to bring their own aircraft, key events also include those hosted by the Colorado Air National Guard and due to the smaller nature of the Fly-In, remote-controlled model aircraft also have a prominent role in the event. Aviation-related craft fairs are also present.
