= Air Reserve Personnel Center =

U.S. Air Force field operating agency

Coordinates: 39°42′29″N 104°46′24″W

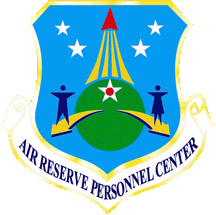
- Air Reserve Personnel Center badge
- Active: 1 November 1953, to present
- Country: United States
- Branch: Air Force Reserve Command
- Type: Numbered Air Force Headquarters equivalent
- Size: Military 222; Civilian 255; Contractors 139
- Part of: AFRC Robins AFB, Georgia
- Headquarters: Buckley Space Force Base, Aurora, Colorado
- Nickname: ARPC
- Motto: Serving Generations of Airmen
- Engagements: Berlin Crisis in 1961; Cuban Missile Crisis in 1962; USS Pueblo Incident in 1968; Southeast Asia in 1968; Desert Shield/Storm in 1990; Operation Noble Eagle; Enduring Freedom from 2001 to present Iraqi Freedom from 2003 to present.

Commanders
- Current commander: Brigadier General Harold W. Linnean III

The Air Reserve Personnel Center manages personnel records for the Air National Guard and Air Force Reserve and it is located at Buckley Space Force Base in Aurora, Colorado. It maintains the virtual Personnel Center, a Web-based portal for Airmen to perform personnel services transactions.

The major command direct reporting unit of Air Force Reserve Command with technical and policy guidance provided by the Chief of Air Force Reserve.

== Operations ==
ARPC is responsible for personnel and administrative support to more than 970,000 Air Force Reserve Command and Air National Guard forces to ensure they are available resources in the event of a national emergency. The center provides support throughout their military careers, from initial entry to retirement, including assignments, promotions and separations

== Units ==
- ARPC Personnel Data Update Branch (DPSD4): provides service to a large customer base including Individual Mobilization Augmentees (IMA), Individual Ready Reservists (IRR) and "Gray Area" retirees.
- ARPC Recognition Services Branch (DPSD3): provides service to a large customer service base to include Individual Mobilization Augmentees, Individual Ready Reserve.
- ARPC Selection Board Secretariat develops and implements personnel policies and procedures relating to officer and enlisted promotions and evaluations for the Reserve components; as well as, managing individual mobilization augmentte performance programs.
- Air Force Reserve Advisory Board: the primary, direct-feed forum to develop and implement clear policies for the Air Force Reserve
- Readiness Management Group: established 1 April 2005, at Air Reserve Personnel Center, Aurora, Colo., and transferred to Robins Air Force Base, Ga., on 1 July 2005, to align administrative control within the Air Force Reserve Command The RMG was inactivated on 30 September 2014. Its mission was taken over by the new Headquarters Readiness and Integration Organization (RIO), which was established as a Direct Reporting Unit (DRU) to ARPC. HQ RIO was activated 1 February 2014.

== History ==
Section source: ARPC Factsheet

The Center was established 1 Nov. 1953, as Detachment 1, Headquarters Continental Air Command, to centralize the custody and maintenance of master personnel records of Reserve Airmen not on extended active duty. The detachment officially began operations 1 March 1954, and soon had responsibilities for a wide variety of personnel actions, including administrative capability for mobilization of the Air Force Reserve.

On 1 Jan. 1957, the organization became Headquarters Air Reserve Records Center, acquiring the status of a numbered Air Force within Continental Air Command. Because of increasing involvement in all areas of personnel management, the Center was renamed the Air Reserve Personnel Center on 1 Sept. 1965. When Continental Air Command was inactivated, ARPC was designated a separate operating agency on 1 Aug. 1968, with no significant change in mission. Responsibility for maintaining personnel records of Air National Guard officers was added in July 1971, and enlisted Airmen in March 1978.

In 1978, its status changed to that of a direct reporting unit and organizational element of the Air Force Reserve. Separate operating agency status was re-established 1 May 1983, and the Center was designated as a field operating agency 5 Feb. 1991. With the establishment of the Air Force Reserve Command (AFRC) on 17 Feb. 1997, ARPC was assigned to AFRC as a major command direct reporting unit.

The center moved from the former Lowry Air Force Base to its current location at Buckley Space Force Base 1 Aug. 2011.

== Mission ==
"To deliver strategic Total Force human resource warfighting capability for the Air Force."

== Vision ==
"To be the recognized leader providing human resource services to generations of Airmen."

== Finance ==
Provides professional financial management services and budget support for Air Reserve Personnel Center headquarters and Select Members of the Ready Reserve.

== See also ==
- Defense Finance and Accounting Service, former Lowry AFB, Denver, CO
- Air Reserve Technician Program
- Civil Reserve Air Fleet
