= 140th Wing =

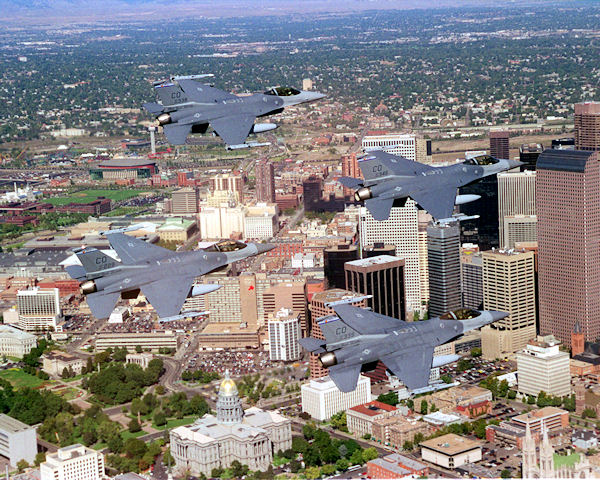
- F-16s of the 140th TFW over Denver, Colorado
- Active: 1950–Present
- Country: United States
- Allegiance: Colorado
- Branch: Air National Guard
- Type: Wing
- Role: Composite Fighter/Transport
- Size: 1400 personnel
- Part of: Colorado Air National Guard
- Garrison/HQ: Buckley Space Force Base, Aurora, Colorado
- Engagements: Vietnam War, Operation Desert Storm, Operation Northern Watch, Operation Southern Watch, Operation Noble Eagle, Operation Enduring Freedom, Operation Iraqi Freedom.

Insignia
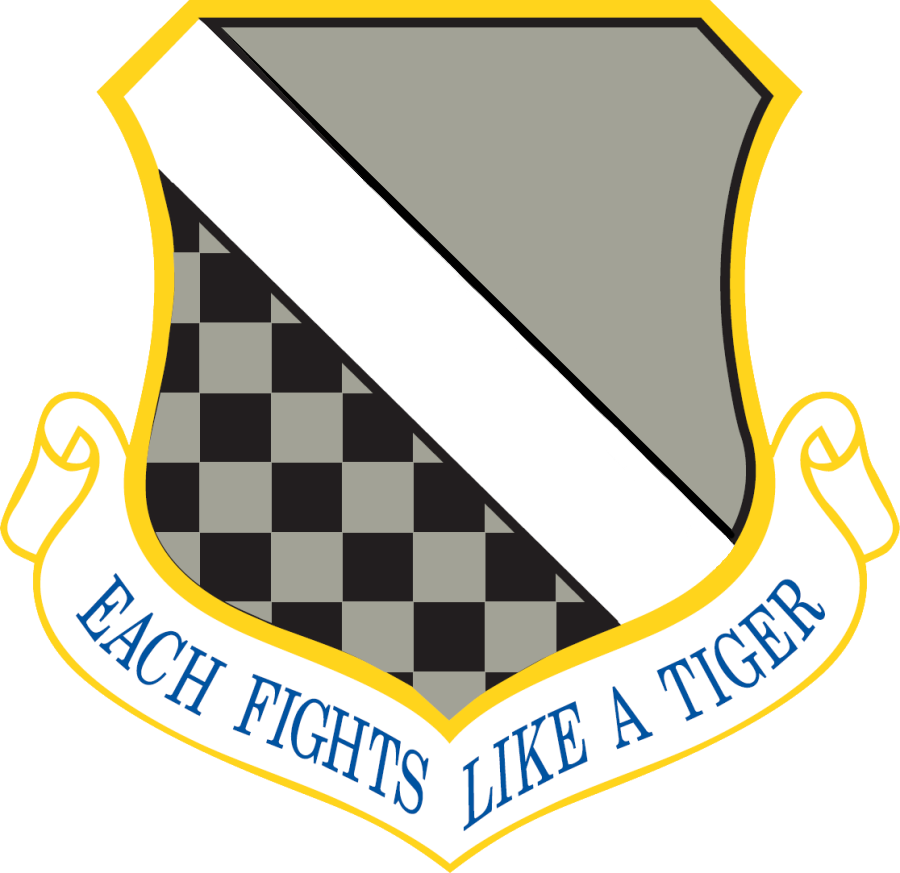
- 140th Wing emblem
- Tail Code: CO "Colorado" tail stripe

The 140th Wing (140 WG) is a unit of the Colorado Air National Guard, stationed at Buckley Space Force Base, Aurora, Colorado. If activated to federal service, the Wing is gained by the United States Air Force Air Combat Command.

The 140th Wing flies the F-16C/D Falcon. It also carries out 137th Space Warning Squadron (Air Force Space Command) and Civil Engineering (Pacific Air Forces) missions. It has over 1200 personnel.

The 120th Fighter Squadron assigned to the Wings 140th Operations Group, is a descendant organization of the World War I 120th Aero Squadron, established on 28 August 1917. It was reformed on 27 June 1923, as the 120th Observation Squadron, one of the 29 original National Guard Observation Squadrons of the United States Army National Guard formed before World War II.

== History ==
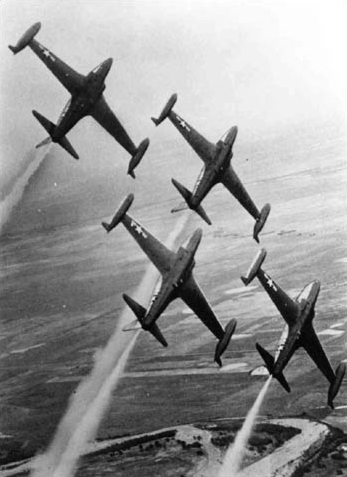
"Minutemen" aerobatics team with F-80Cs, 1956

The wartime 370th Fighter Group was re-activated and re-designated as the 140th Fighter Group, and was allotted to the Colorado Air National Guard on 24 May 1946. It was organized at Buckley Field, Colorado, and was extended federal recognition on 1 October 1946 by the National Guard Bureau. The unit was the first Air National Guard group receiving federal recognition. The 140th Fighter Group was entitled to the history, honors, and colors of the 370th Fighter Group. It was assigned to the 86th Fighter Wing.

During August of '51 they deployed 20 P-51D aircraft and supporting personnel to Wilmington, North Carolina on Operation Southern Pine. It was one of the largest exercises of the era which involved 100,000 troops and over 400 aircraft to defend North and South Carolina from a mock Soviet invasion.

The 140th Fighter Group consisted of the 120th Fighter Squadron at Buckley Field. As part of the Continental Air Command Fourth Air Force, the unit trained for tactical fighter missions and air-to-air combat. On 31 October 1950 the 86th Fighter Wing was inactivated, and the 140th was changed in status to a Wing, taking over the personnel and mission of the 86th.

Organized and received federal recognition, 1 November 1950, assuming personnel and equipment of 86th Fighter Wing (Inactivated)

=== Korean War activation ===
As a result of the Korean War, the 140th Fighter Wing was federalized and brought to active duty on 1 April 1951. The unit was ordered to the new Clovis Air Force Base, New Mexico, which arrived in October 1951. The federalized 140th was a composite organization of activated Air National Guard units, composed of the 120th, the 187th Fighter Squadron (Wyoming ANG) and the 190th Fighter Squadron (Utah ANG). The 140th and its components were equipped with F-51D Mustangs, and were re-designated as Fighter-Bomber squadrons on 12 April 1951.

During their period of federal service, many pilots were sent to Japan and South Korea to reinforce active-duty units. Three hundred and seventy five (375) airmen of the 140th FBW volunteered to take part in the tactical phase of the Charlie Shot of Operation Tumbler-Snapper which was a nuclear bomb test in Nevada. On 22 April 1952, they were among the first troops to go to ground zero an hour after the detonation to simulate an attack. It was also the first time the media was allowed to witness a nuclear test and it was the first event ever to be televised nationally. On 15 November 1952, the elements of the 140th returned to Air National Guard control in their respective states.

=== Cold War ===
Upon return to Colorado state control, the 140th was re-equipped by Tactical Air Command with F-80C Shooting Star jets. On 1 July 1955, the Wing was redesignated as the 140th Fighter-Interceptor Wing, being assigned to the 34th Air Division, Air Defense Command.

In 1958, the 140th FIW implemented the ADC Runway Alert Program, in which interceptors of the 120th Fighter-Interceptor Squadron were committed to a five-minute runway alert. In 1960 the F-86s were again replaced by the F-86L Sabre Interceptor, a day/night/all-weather aircraft designed to be integrated into the ADC SAGE interceptor direction and control system.

=== Tactical Air Command/Vietnam War ===
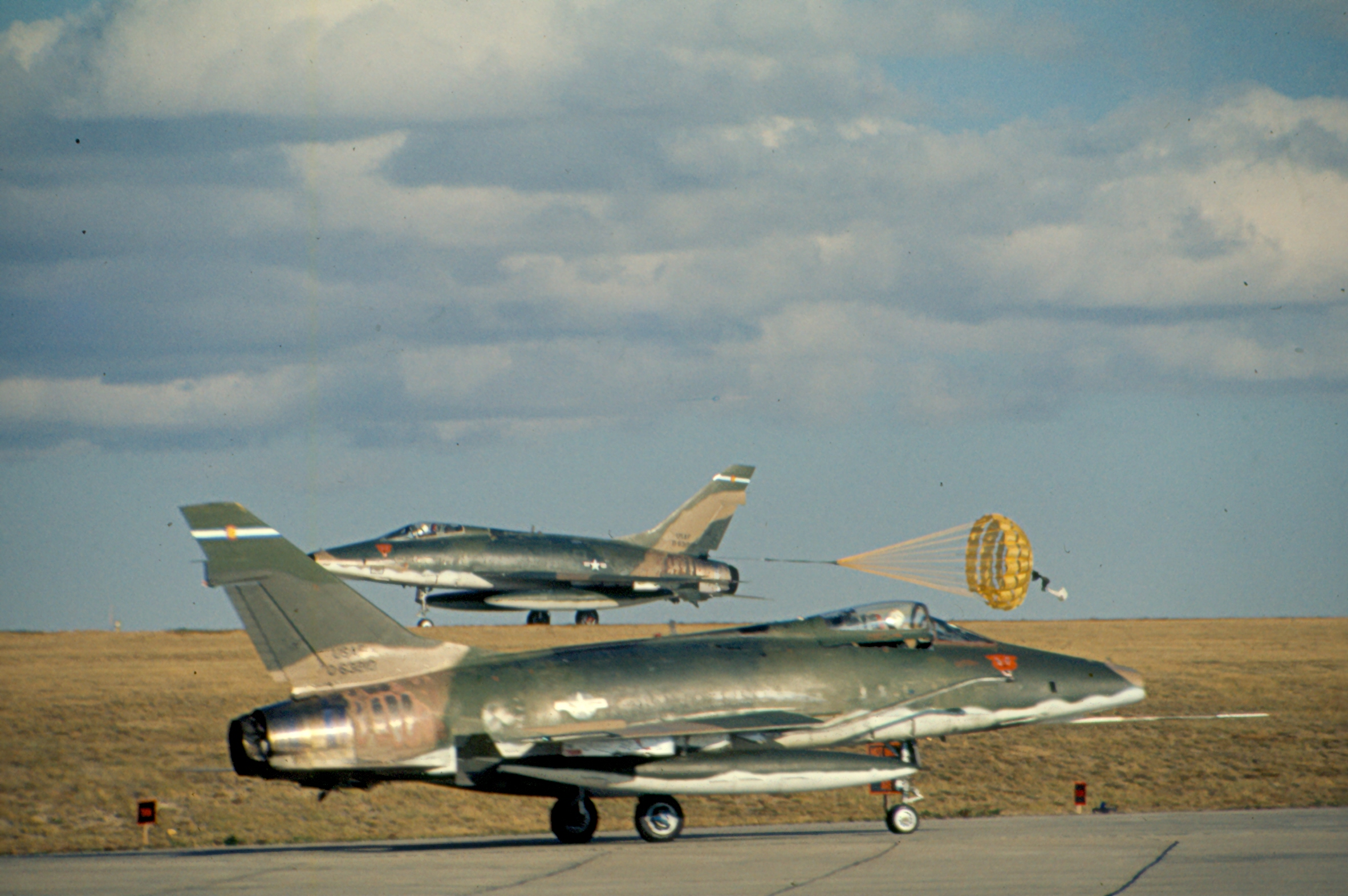
120th TFS F-100D Super Sabres, 1973

The 140th was transferred back to Tactical Air Command in January 1961, being equipped with the F-100 Super Sabre supersonic tactical fighter-bomber. During the 1961 Berlin Crisis and the 1962 Cuban Missile Crisis, the Wing was placed on Alert by Tactical Air Command, however the aircraft and personnel of the wing stayed in place at Buckley Air Force Base, and were not deployed. The 140th deployed to Incirlik, Turkey, for 15 days in 1967, to take part in a NATO exercise called "Deep Furrow".

On 26 January 1968, the 140th Tactical Fighter Wing was federalized and taken under the jurisdiction of Twelfth Air Force, Tactical Air Command. The Wing's 120th TFS was reassigned to the 35th Tactical Fighter Wing, its aircraft/personnel/equipment being reassigned to Phan Rang AB, South Vietnam. As was the practice during the Vietnam Era, most of the wing's personnel were also sent to various Tactical Air Command units, either in the United States or deployed to units in Pacific Air Forces or USAFE. The Wing, stripped of its assets, was placed in a Non-Operational status by HQ TAC.

With the end of its federalized service, the Wing, the 120th TFS and its personnel were released from active duty and returned to Colorado state control on 30 April 1969. With its return to Buckley, the wing was returned to Operational Status. The 120th TFS F-100Cs returned to Buckley, however with the withdraw of the F-100Ds from South Vietnam in 1971, the squadrons were upgraded with the newer model from the Vietnam Veteran aircraft returning.

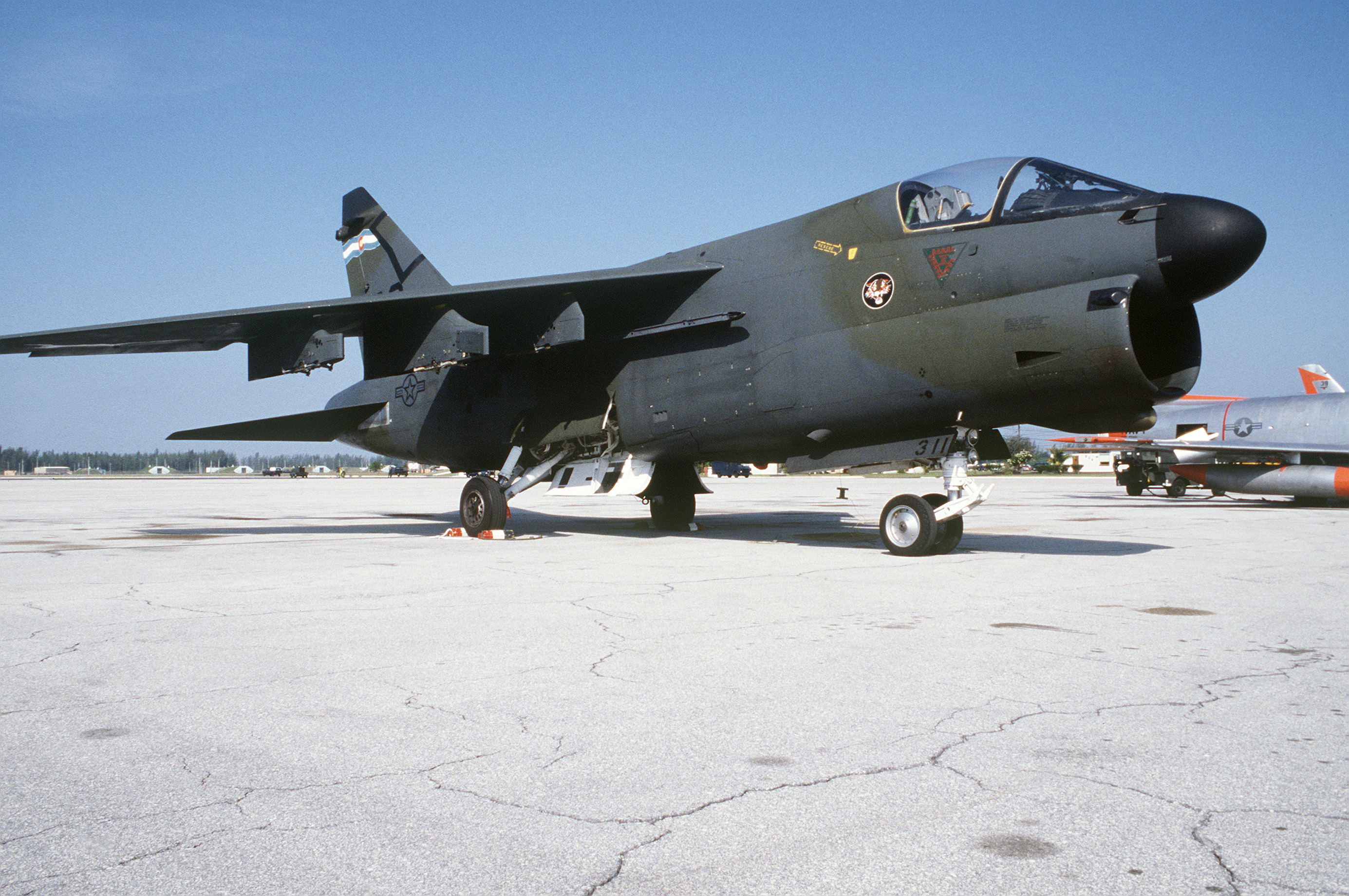
Colorado ANG A-7D, 1986

In 1974, the Wing began receiving A-7D Corsair II ground attack aircraft from active duty U.S. Air Force wings as part of their transition to the A-10 Thunderbolt II. Then in 1975, new A-7Ds were received as the result of Congressional funding to the DOD FY 1975 and FY 1976 budgets for the procurement of additional A-7Ds, primarily to keep the LTV production line in Dallas open and the workers employed in the wake of post-Vietnam DOD procurement reductions. As a result of these unplanned acquisitions, the Air Force assigned these new 1975 and 1976 built aircraft in the mid-1970s. Then the wing relieved some new twin seat A-7Ks trainers in 1983.

The 140th deployed in 1977 to Gilze-Rijen AB, Netherlands, to participate in exercise Coronet Ante, with A-7D Corsair. This was the first time a U.S. Air Force or National Guard unit had deployed to a Dutch-owned and operated base. In September and October 1979, the unit deployed to Merzilon AB, Turkey, as part of Exercise Coronet Rider. The unit deployed its entire squadron of 24 aircraft for 30 days. This was the first time any Air National Guard unit had deployed under "bare base" conditions in which only a runway and water supply were provided.

Under the Coronet Cove program, the 140th deployed to the Republic of Panama 11 times to support the defense of the Canal Zone as provided under the Panama Canal Treaty of 1977. The first such deployment took place in December 1978 and the last deployment ended in February 1989.

The A-7Ds were flown to victory as the "World Champions" in the inaugural "Gunsmoke" competition held at Nellis Air Force Base in 1981.

=== Modern era ===
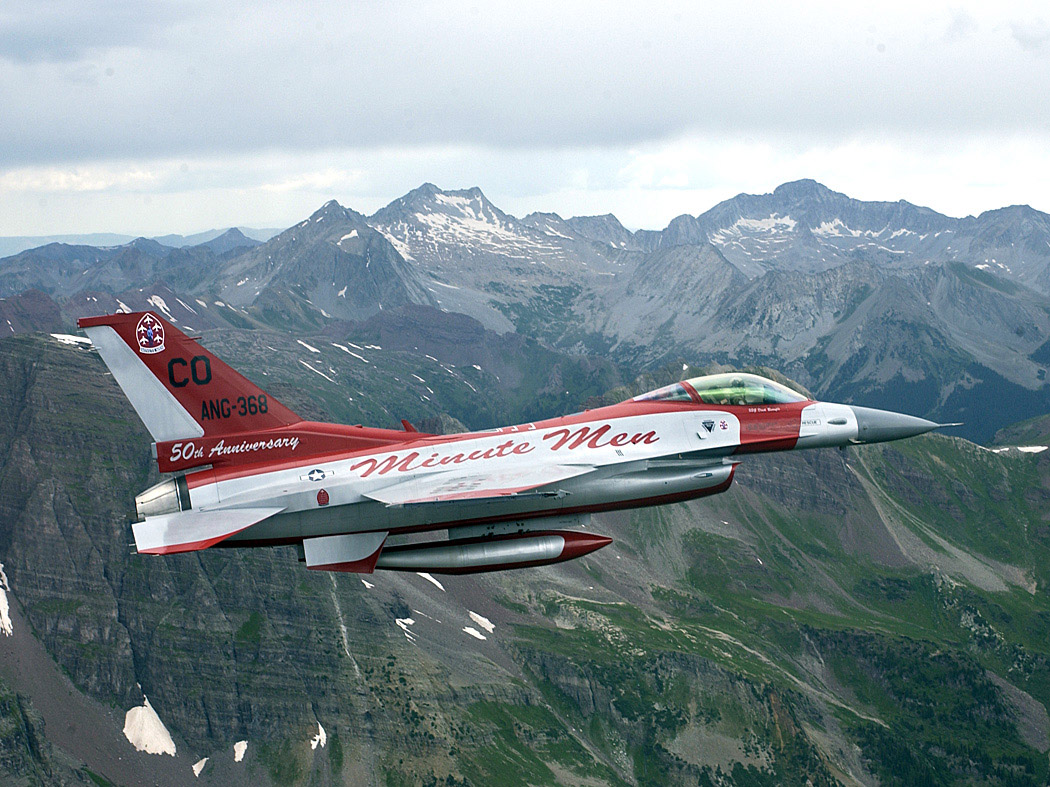
The "Minutemen" F-16C, 2006

The A-7Ds were operated until March 1992 when the Wing converted to Block 30 F-16C/Ds Fighting Falcons, and the Corsairs were retired to Davis-Monthan AFB.

With the conversion to the F-16 in September 1991, the 140th Wing had deployed to the Republic of Korea; the CommonWealth of Australia in March 1995; to Incirlik, Turkey, for Operation Provide Comfort II in April 1995; to Al Jaber AB, Kuwait, for Operation Southern Watch in June 1996; to Karup, Denmark, for NATO exercise Coronet Blade in August 1997 (with mini-deployments to Germany to fly with German MiG-29s and to the Republic of Slovenia for state-to-state partnership); and again to Al Jaber AB, Kuwait for Operation Southern Watch in January 1998. The unit deployed again to Incirlik, Turkey, in 2000 for Operation Northern Watch.

The 140th WG transferred financial and operational responsibility for Buckley ANGB to US Air Force Space Command in October 2000. The major reason for the change in responsibilities for providing base operating support and quality of life services from the Colorado Air National Guard to the active-duty Air Force is the growing presence of active-duty personnel at Buckley. Becoming an active duty base, Buckley ANGB was renamed Buckley AFB.

Following the attacks on the United States on September, 11th 2001, the 140th FS assumed tasking to provide homeland defense as an integral part of Operation Noble Eagle.

In its 2005 BRAC Recommendations, DoD recommended to realign Springfield-Beckley Municipal Airport AGS, OH. It would distribute the 178th Fighter Wing's F-16 aircraft to the 140th Wing (ANG), Buckley AFB, CO (three aircraft) and two other installations. DoD claimed that it made this recommendation because Buckley (64) had higher military value than Springfield-Beckley (128) and Buckley had a role in the Homeland Defense mission.

=== Units circa 2019 ===
The 140th Wing is a composite organization, composed of diverse units.

- 140th Operations Group

The 120th Fighter Squadron (FS) operates the F-16 Fighting Falcon. It is a dual-purpose fighter squadron with pilots qualified to perform air-to-air and air-to-ground missions, including offensive counter-air (OCA), defensive counter-air (DCA), OCA interdiction, close air support (CAS), and combat search and rescue (CSAR) missions.
140th Operations Support Flight

- 140th Mission Support Group
- 140th Medical Group
- 140th Maintenance Group
- 233rd Space Group based at Greeley, Colorado. The group is composed of more than 300 Airmen and operates a strategic, survivable, mobile USAF ground system that provides immediate, worldwide missile warning, space launch, and nuclear detection data to the National Command Authority (Secretary of Defense and President). They are able to survive and operate through all phases of trans/post nuclear attack.

== Lineage ==
- Constituted as the 140th Fighter Wing, and allotted to Colorado ANG on 31 October 1950

Organized and federally recognized on 1 November 1950
Federalized and placed on active duty, 1 April 1951
Redesignated: 140th Fighter-Bomber Wing on 12 April 1951
Released from active duty and returned to Colorado state control, 15 November 1952
Redesignated: 140th Fighter-Interceptor Wing on 1 July 1955
Redesignated: 140th Air Defense Wing on 1 July 1957
Redesignated: 140th Tactical Fighter Wing on 1 January 1961
Federalized and placed on active duty, 25 January 1968
Released from active duty and returned to Colorado state control, 30 April 1969
Redesignated: 140th Fighter Wing on 15 March 1992
Redesignated: 140th Wing on 1 July 1995

=== Assignments ===
- Colorado Air National Guard, 1 November 1950

Gained by: Fourth Air Force, Continental Air Command

- Tactical Air Command, 1 April 1951
- Colorado Air National Guard, 15 November 1952

Gained by: Tactical Air Command
Gained by: 34th Air Division, Air Defense Command, 1 July 1955
Gained by: Albuquerque Air Defense Sector, Air Defense Command, 1 July 1960
Gained by: Tactical Air Command, 1 January 1961
Gained by: Air Combat Command, 1 June 1992–Present

=== Components ===
==== Air National Guard ====
- 140th Fighter (later Fighter-Bomber, Fighter-Interceptor, Fighter (Air Defense), Tactical Fighter, Operations) Group, 31 October 1950 – 30 June 1974; 1 July 1995 – Present
- 120th Fighter Group (Air Defense), 1 July 1955 – 31 December 1960 (Montana ANG)
- 124th Fighter Group (Air Defense), 1 July 1955 – 31 December 1960 (Idaho ANG)
- 150th Fighter Group (Air Defense), 1 July 1957 – 31 December 1960 (New Mexico ANG)
- 153d Fighter Group (Air Defense), 1 Jul 1957 – 31 December 1960 (Wyoming ANG)
- 200th Airlift Squadron, 1 June 1992 - 1 June 2018
- 120th Fighter (later Fighter-Bomber, Fighter-Interceptor, Tactical Fighter, Fighter) Squadron, 30 June 1974 – 1 July 1995

=== Stations ===
- Buckley Field, Colorado, 1 November 1950
- Clovis Air Force Base (later Cannon Air Force Base), New Mexico, 12 April 1951
- Buckley Field (later Buckley Air National Guard Base), Colorado, 1 January 1953
- Cannon Air Force Base, New Mexico, c. 1 May 1968 (not operational)
- Buckley Air National Guard Base (then Buckley Air Force Base, later Buckley Space Force Base), Colorado, 30 April 1969 – Present

=== Aircraft ===
- P-38 Lightning, 1943–1945
- P-51 Mustang, 1945
- F-51D Mustang, 1946–1953
- F-80C Shooting Star, 1953–1958
- F-86E Sabre, 1958–1960
- F-86L Sabre Interceptor, 1960–1961
- F-100C/F Super Sabre, 1961–1971
- F-100D/F Super Sabre, 1971–1974
- A-7D/K Corsair II, 1974–1992
- Boeing T-43A, 1992-1997
- Fairchild C-26B Metroliner, 1996-1997
- C-21A Learjet, 1997–2018
- F-16C/D Fighting Falcon, 1992–Present

== Decorations ==
- Air Force Outstanding Unit Award
  - 1994–1996
