= Combat Logistics Regiment 4 =

US Marine Corps Reserve unit

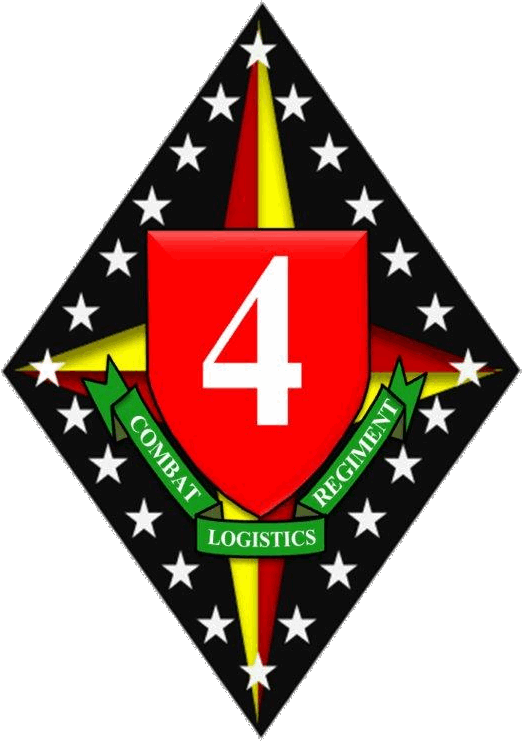
- Active: 2013 – present
- Country: United States
- Branch: United States Marine Corps
- Type: Logistics
- Part of: 4th Marine Logistics Group; Marine Forces Reserve
- Garrison/HQ: Kansas City, Missouri
- Nickname: "Black Diamond Regiment"

Commanders
- Commander: Colonel Julian Tsukano

Combat Logistics Regiment 4 (CLR-4) is a regiment of the United States Marine Corps Reserve. It was activated on September 8, 2013 in Kansas City, Missouri.

== Organization ==
- Combat Logistics Regiment 4 (CLR 4), in Kansas City, (MO)
  - Headquarters Company, in Kansas City, (MO)
  - Combat Logistics Battalion 23, (CLB 23), in Joint Base Lewis–McChord, (WA)
    - Headquarters and Service Company, in Joint Base Lewis–McChord, (WA)
    - Engineer Services Company, in Springfield, (OR)
    - Maintenance Services Company, in Sacramento, (CA)
    - Transportation Services Company, in Lathrop, (CA)
  - Combat Logistics Battalion 453 (CLB 453), in Aurora, (CO)
    - Headquarters and Service Company, in Aurora, (CO)
    - Maintenance Company, in Waco, (TX)
    - Motor Transport Company, in Lubbock, (TX)
    - Supply Company, in San Jose, (CA)

== History ==
From its inception as a Logistics Regiment, CLR-4 has been at the forefront of integration of Reserve Marines with active duty Marines. In August 2014, a detachment of CLR-4 Marines went to South Korea in support of Ulchi Freedom Guardian; in subsequent years, the Regiment has supported various Korean Theater of Operations exercises. In February 2015, CLR-4 took part in an active component Marine Expeditionary Force Level Exercise. In April 2016, CLR-4 provided the headquarters element for Combined Joint Task Force African Lion in the Kingdom of Morocco. In June 2017, the Regimental Headquarters conducted a battle simulation scenario-based event involving the Commanding Officer and staff in Fort McCoy, Wisconsin.

== Past commanders ==
- Colonel Randall K. Jones (2022-2024)
- Colonel Daniel H. Coleman (2020-2022)
- Colonel Robert T. Meade (2018-2020)
- Colonel Thomas M. Fahy (2016-2018)
- Colonel Joseph N. Raftery (2014-2016)
- Colonel Charles L. Sides (2013-2014) (previously 24th Marine Regiment Commander and oversaw unit transition)
