= 233rd Space Group =

233d Space Group
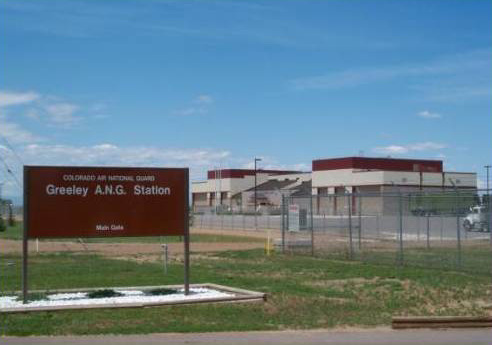
- 233d Space Group front gate, Greeley, Colorado
- Active: 1992 – present
- Country: United States
- Allegiance: Colorado
- Branch: Air National Guard
- Type: Group
- Role: Space Communications
- Part of: Attached to 140th Wing
- Garrison/HQ: Greeley Air National Guard Station, Greeley, Colorado

Commanders
- Current commander: Col. Stephanie Figueroa

The 233d Space Group (233SG) is a unit of the Colorado Air National Guard located at Greeley Air National Guard Station, Greeley, CO. The 233d Space Group provides immediate worldwide missile warning as well as space launch and detection in the event of an attack against the United States. It comprises about 400 Airmen, including technicians, Active Guard Reserve, and traditional Guard members. If activated to federal service, the Wing is gained by the United States Air Force or United States Space Force depending on decisions made by military leaders and Congress. Talks are still ongoing as of April 2026.

== Overview ==
The 233d Space Group operates the Air Force's strategic survivable, mobile Defense Support Program ground station. The group provides endurable missile warning detection to the National Command Authority and has the ability to survive and operate through all phases of trans/post attack. In addition, the satellites provide immediate worldwide missile warning, space launch, and nuclear detonation detection.

The members of the 233d Space Group are currently in the middle of a larger discussion involving a potential Space National Guard. The idea of a Space National Guard was introduced by military leaders upon the formation of The Space Force in 2019, but was turned down by Congress in 2021. Idaho Senator Mike Crapo introduced a bill to create a Space National Guard in March 2025; that bill has not progressed out of committee. In August 2025, the Space Force absorbed nine space-related Air National Guard missions, sidestepping the Space National Guard creation effort, but the 233d Space Group remains an Air National Guard unit.

== History ==
The history of the 233d Space Group is in the equipment it operates. The 233d Space Group activated 1 October 1995, assuming the mission of the 4th Space Warning Squadron (4 SWS), Holloman AFB, New Mexico.

=== Mobile DSP Communications ===
The mobile Defense Support Program (DSP) communication mission began on 1 October 1983, as the 1025th Communications Squadron (Mobile). The 1025 CS spent its first three years testing the new mobile satellite communications equipment and training its people. On 1 November 1985, administrative operations were transferred to the 1st Space Wing, part of the newly formed Air Force Space Command. The 1025th Space Communications Squadron was redesignated as the 4th Satellite Communications Squadron on 1 August 1986. During an Air Force-wide reorganization, the 1st Space Wing and the 3d Space Wing were inactivated, and their assets merged into the newly renamed 21st Space Wing, at Peterson AFB, Colorado. The unit was renamed the 4th Space Communications Squadron. On 1 October 1992, the 4th SCS's mission was declassified. When the duties of the 4th SWS transferred to other space projects, the mobile DSP mission was transferred to the newly formed 137th Space Warning Squadron, activated in 1995. In 2012, the 233d Space Group was established and the 137th Space Warning Squadron became the first operational squadron of the 233d Space Group.

== Assignments ==
=== Major Command/Gaining Command ===
- Air National Guard/Air Force Space Command (1995 – present)

== Previous designations ==
- 1 October 1983 – The 137th SWS activated as the 1025th Satellite Communications Squadron (SCS)
- 1 August 1986 – The 1025th SCS was re-designated as the 4th SCS
- 1 October 1992 – The 4th SCS's mission was declassified and became the 4th Space Warning Squadron.
- 1 October 1995 – The 137th Space Warning Squadron activated
- 1 March 2012 – The 137th Space Warning Squadron was re-designated as the 233d Space Group

== Equipment operated ==
- Mobile Ground System (MGS) of the Defense Support Program (1995 – present)
