= Colorado Air National Guard =

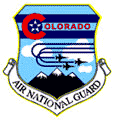
- Shield of the Colorado Air National Guard
- Active: 27 June 1923 – present
- Country: United States
- Allegiance: Colorado
- Branch: Air National Guard
- Type: State militia, military reserve force
- Role: "To meet state and federal mission responsibilities."
- Part of: Colorado National Guard; United States National Guard Bureau; National Guard
- Garrison/HQ: Department of Military & Veterans Affairs, 6848 South Revere Parkway, Centennial, Colorado, 80112

Commanders
- Civilian leadership: President Donald Trump (Commander-in-Chief); Frank Kendall III (Secretary of the Air Force); Governor Jared Polis (Governor of the State of Colorado)
- State military leadership: MG Robert Davis (Adjutant General, State of Colorado); Brigadier General D. Micah Fesler; Call sign: Zeus (Assistant Adjutant General-Air); Colonel Jeremiah S. Tucker (140th Wing Commander)

Aircraft flown
- Fighter: F-16C/D Fighting Falcon
- Transport: C-21A Learjet

The Colorado Air National Guard (CO ANG) is the aerial militia of the State of Colorado, United States of America. Along with the Colorado Army National Guard, it is an element of the Colorado National Guard and reserve of the U.S. Air Force. The units of the Colorado Air National Guard are not in the normal United States Air Force or United States Space Force chain of command; they fall under the jurisdiction of the governor of Colorado through the office of the Colorado Adjutant General unless they are federalized by order of the president of the United States. The Colorado Air National Guard is headquartered in Centennial, and its commanders are currently Major General Robert Davis as The Adjutant General (TAG) of Colorado and Brigadier General D. Micah Fesler as the Assistant Adjutant General for Air (ATAG-Air) and Commander, Colorado Air National Guard (COANG/CC).

The Colorado Air National Guard's 120th Fighter Squadron was the first federally recognized Air National Guard unit after the Second World War, receiving this distinction on 30 June 1946.

== Overview ==
Under the "Total Force" concept, Colorado Air National Guard units are considered to be Air Reserve Component (ARC) units of the United States Air Force (USAF). Colorado ANG units are trained and equipped by the Air Force and are operationally gained by a major command of the USAF or a Field Command of the USSF if federalized. In addition, the Colorado Air National Guard forces are assigned to Air Expeditionary Forces and are subject to deployment tasking orders along with their active duty and Air Force Reserve counterparts in their assigned cycle deployment window.

Along with their federal reserve obligations, as state militia units the elements of the Colorado ANG are subject to being activated by order of the governor to provide protection of life and property, and preserve peace, order and public safety. State missions include disaster relief in times of earthquakes, hurricanes, floods and forest fires, search and rescue, protection of vital public services, and support to civil defense.

== Components ==
The Colorado Air National Guard consists of the following units:

- 140th Fighter Wing

Established 27 June 1923 (as: 120th Observation Squadron); operates: F-16C/D Fighting Falcon
Stationed at: Buckley Space Force Base, Aurora
Gained by: Air Combat Command
Executes a dual-purpose mission with pilots qualified to perform air-to-air and air-to-ground missions, including Offensive Counter-Air (OCA), Defensive Counter-Air (DCA), OCA Interdiction, Close Air Support (CAS), and Combat Search and Rescue (CSAR) missions.
- 233rd Space Group
Established 2012
- 137th Space Warning Squadron
Established 1 October 1983 (as: 1025th Satellite Communications Squadron)
Stationed at: Greeley Air National Guard Station, Greeley
Gained by: U.S. Space Force
Composed of more than 300 Airmen and is the United States Air Force's only strategic, survivable, mobile ground system that provides immediate, worldwide missile warning, space launch, and nuclear detection to National Command Authority. They are able to survive and operate through all phases of trans-/post-nuclear attack.

== History ==
The Colorado Air National Guard origins date to 28 August 1917 with the establishment of the 120th Aero Squadron as part of the World War I American Expeditionary Force. The 120th served in France on the Western Front, then after the 1918 Armistice with Germany was demobilized in 1919.

The Militia Act of 1903 established the present National Guard system, units raised by the states but paid for by the Federal Government, liable for immediate state service. If federalized by Presidential order, they fall under the regular military chain of command. On 1 June 1920, the Militia Bureau issued Circular No.1 on organization of National Guard air units.

On 27 June 1923, the 120th Observation Squadron, 45th Division, Aviation was mustered into service as part of the Colorado Army National Guard. It is one of the 29 original National Guard Observation Squadrons of the United States Army National Guard formed before World War II. Initially composed of eight officers and 50 enlisted members, the unit flew Curtis JN-4Es (better known as Jennies), an aircraft which proved to be unsuitable for flying at Denver elevations. One year later, the 120th began flying out of Lowry Field. The brand new airfield was named in honor of 2nd Lt. Francis B. Lowry who was shot down and killed near Crepion, France in 1918 while on a photographic mission. Mobilization for World War II took place on 6 January 1941, 11 months prior to the bombing of Pearl Harbor. The unit, then 19 officers and 116 enlisted members, moved to Biggs Field, Texas.

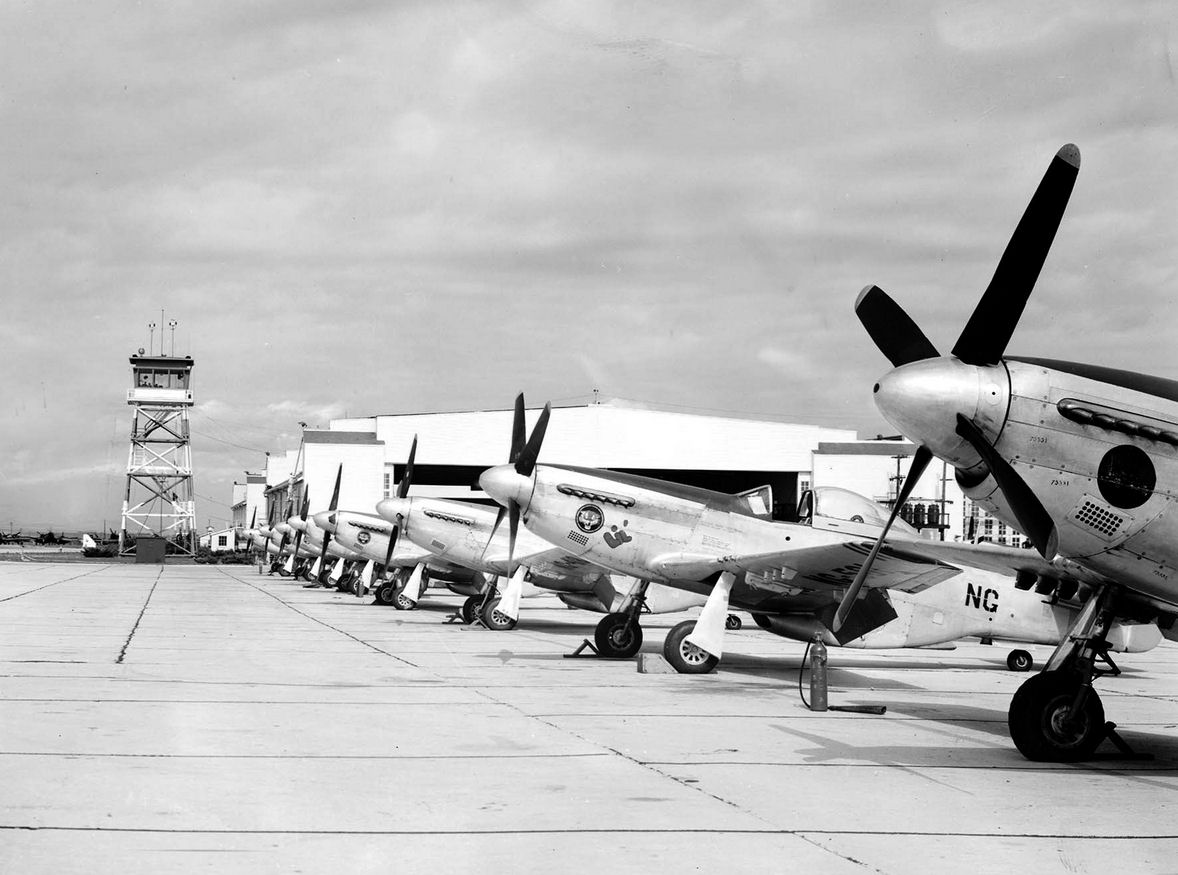
F-51 Mustangs of the 120th Fighter Squadron, 1946

On 24 May 1946, the United States Army Air Forces, in response to dramatic postwar military budget cuts imposed by President Harry S. Truman, allocated inactive unit designations to the National Guard Bureau for the formation of an Air Force National Guard. These unit designations were allotted and transferred to various State National Guard bureaus to provide them unit designations to re-establish them as Air National Guard units.

The modern Colorado ANG received federal recognition on 3 July 1946 as the 86th Fighter Wing at Buckley Field, Denver. Its 140th Fighter Group was also formed at Buckley Field, with the 120th Fighter Squadron equipped with F-51 Mustangs and its mission was the air defense of the state. 18 September 1947, however, is considered the Colorado Air National Guard's official birth concurrent with the establishment of the United States Air Force as a separate branch of the United States military under the National Security Act.

Today, the 140th Wing at Buckley Space Force Base is a composite organization, with its 120th Fighter Squadron operating Block 30 F-16C/D Fighting Falcons in both a homeland security as well as a tactical fighter mission. The 200th Airlift Squadron flies C-21A Learjets with a Special Air Mission for VIP personnel, along with aeromedical evacuation. The 137th Space Warning Squadron at Greeley Employs the Air Force's only strategic survivable mobile ground system (MGS) to receive early warning data.

After the September 11th, 2001 terrorist attacks on the United States, elements of every Air National Guard unit in Colorado have been activated in support of the global war on terrorism. Flight crews, aircraft maintenance personnel, communications technicians, air controllers, and air security personnel were engaged in Operation Noble Eagle air defense overflights of major United States cities. Also, Colorado ANG units have been deployed overseas as part of Operation Enduring Freedom in Afghanistan and Operation Iraqi Freedom in Iraq as well as other locations as directed.

In 2007, the Colorado Air National Guard, assisted by the Wyoming Air National Guard, dropped thousands of bales of hay in Colorado ranges to prevent cattle heads trapped by heavy snows from starving.

== See also ==
- Colorado Wing Civil Air Patrol
