= 120th Fighter Squadron =

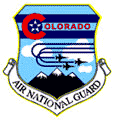
120th Fighter Squadron

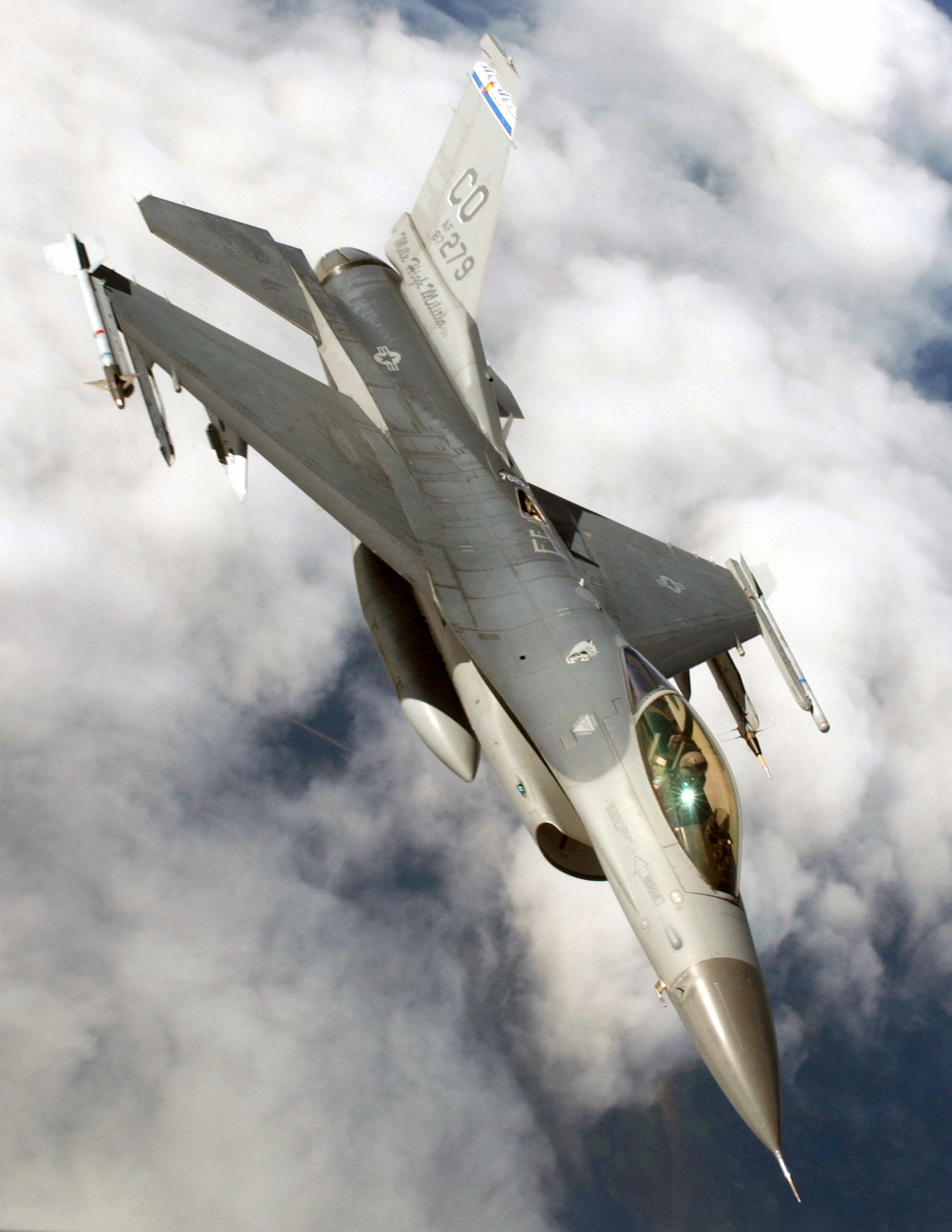
- F-16C Fighting Falcon of the 120th Fighter Squadron, Colorado Air National Guard
- Active: 1917–1919; 1923–1943; 1946–1952; 1952–present
- Country: United States
- Allegiance: Colorado
- Branch: Air National Guard
- Type: Squadron
- Role: Fighter
- Part of: Colorado Air National Guard
- Garrison/HQ: Buckley Space Force Base, Colorado
- Nicknames: Colorado Cougars; Mile High Militia
- Motto: First in the Air Guard
- Mascots: Colorado mountain lion Colorado Cougars
- Engagements: World War I Vietnam War; Operation Iraqi Freedom
- Decorations: Air Force Outstanding Unit Award with Combat "V" Device

Insignia
- 120th Fighter Squadron emblem (Note: Approved 14 April 1957.)

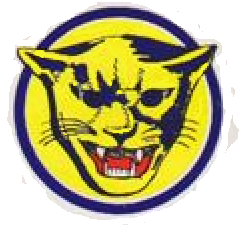
- 120th Observation Squadron emblem
- Tail code: CO
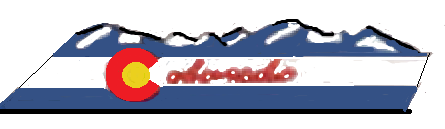
- Tail stripe

The 120th Fighter Squadron is a unit of the Colorado Air National Guard 140th Wing located at Buckley Space Force Base, Colorado. The 120th is equipped with the F-16C/D Fighting Falcon.

The squadron is a descendant organization of the World War I 120th Aero Squadron, established on 28 August 1917. It was reformed on 27 June 1923, as the 120th Observation Squadron, and was one of the 29 original National Guard Observation Squadrons of the United States Army National Guard formed before World War II.

The 120th Fighter Squadron was the first federally recognized Air National Guard unit after World War II, receiving this distinction on 30 June 1946. Thus, their motto is, "First in the Air Guard."

== Mission ==
The current mission of the 120th is to operate at the highest levels of military and domestic policy protecting the American Midwest. The squadron has supported Operation Enduring Freedom and deployed five times in support of Operation Iraqi Freedom, most recently to Joint Base Balad, Iraq, in 2010. The 120th has also supported an Air Expeditionary Forces deployment in the Pacific region and multiple National Special Security Events, such as the Democratic National Convention in 2008, in Denver, Colorado.

== History ==
=== World War I ===
The 120th Fighter Squadron dates its origins to the 120th Aero Squadron, organized at Kelly Field, Texas, on 6 August 1917. In July 1917, the men of the squadron were first organized at Fort Thomas, Kentucky, where the recruits, about 160 of them, were sent to Kelly Field. There the squadron was placed into indoctrination training, learning infantry drill and also attended the airplane instruction school. On 1 November, the squadron was ordered to Ellington Field, Houston, Texas. Upon arrival, the squadron was ordered to begin the work of operating the field for the Air Service. A civilian construction firm, the American Construction Company, Houston, was contracted to put up the hangars and make the place habitable. The first duty of the squadron was to assemble about 100 airplanes, and put them in a flyable condition for use as training planes.

On 30 January 1918, the squadron was ordered for overseas duty and moved to the Aviation Concentration Center, Garden City, Long Island. There the squadron was equipped for overseas duty. On 16 February, the squadron was ordered to report to the Port of Entry, Hoboken, New Jersey for boarding on the former Cunard Liner RMS Carmania for transport. After an uneventful Atlantic crossing, it arrived at Liverpool, England on 4 March. The next day the squadron was moved to the American Rest Camp Romsey, near Winchester. There, the squadron was attached to the Royal Flying Corps for additional training, and on 9 March, it boarded a train, reporting to the RFC No. 1 Observer's School of Aerial Gunnery, New Romney, Kent. There, the squadron trained with the British soldiers at the station, maintained the camp and performed aircraft maintenance. This work continued until 9 August when orders were given for the squadron to divide into "Flights". "A" and "B" Flights were ordered to RFC Stamford, England, while "C" Flight was ordered to RNAS Crail, Scotland. This meant that the squadron had completed its training in England and was ready for duty at the front. After about a month of final training, the squadron was re-combined at Southampton for transfer to France.

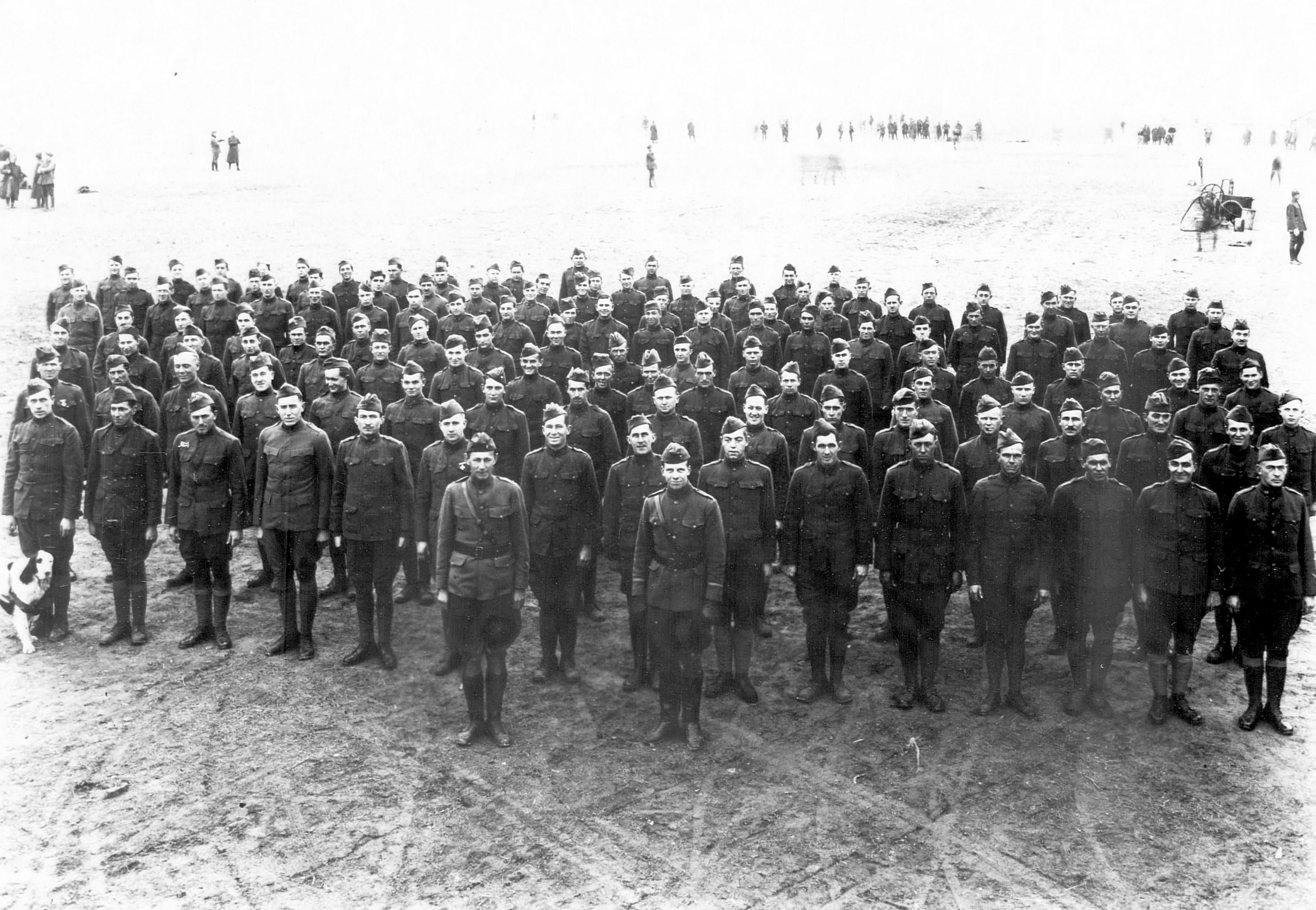
Men of the 120th Aero Squadron, 2d Aviation Instruction Center, Tours Aerodrome, France, November 1918.

After a cross-channel crossing on the SS Archangel, the squadron arrived at Le Havre, France on 3 September, and took a train to the Replacement Concentration Center, AEF, St. Maixent Replacement Barracks, France, arriving on 6 September 1918. After processing, the squadron was ordered to report to the 2d Aviation Instruction Center (2d AIC), Tours Aerodrome, in central France. This came as a great disappointment to the squadron, as it was prepared to serve on the front, however, as the squadron has almost no experience in the French biplanes used at the front, it was felt it could do better work at the training center. At the 2d AIC, the men of the 120th were assigned to nearly every department at the field, in the machine shops working on aircraft to the transportation department where the men drove trucks and all manner of vehicles. A great many of the men were not fitted for the jobs assigned and required training in order to be of useful service.

The squadron remained at 2d AIC until after the armistice with Germany in November 1918, then returned to the United States via Bordeaux, France, in April 1918, arriving at Mitchel Field, New York on 6 May 1919. It then was moved to Kelly Field, Texas, where it was demobilized on 17 May 1919 and the men were returned to civilian life.

=== Interwar period ===
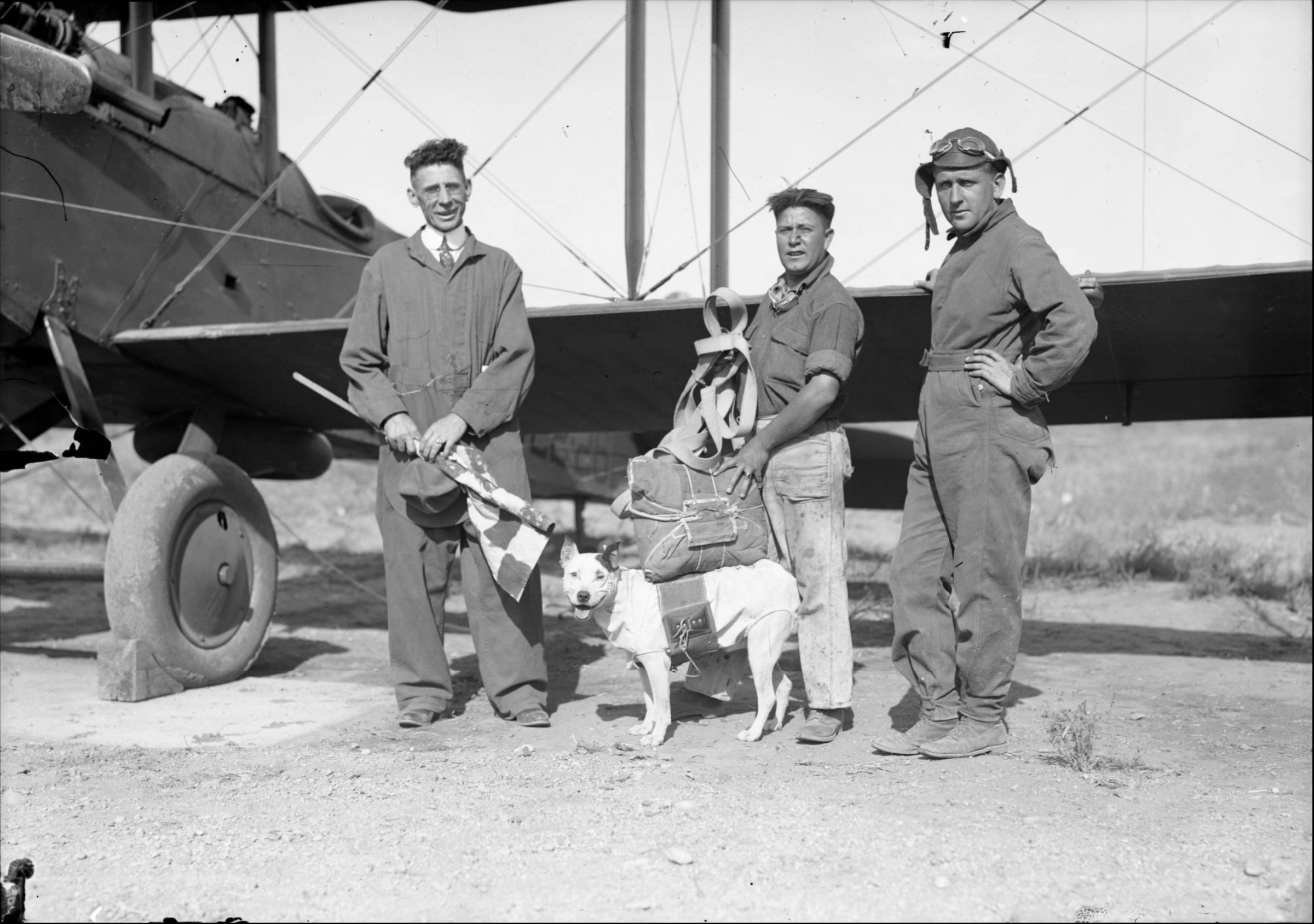
Members of the 120th Aero Observation Squadron at Lowry Airfield with their mascot, Jeff (equipped with a parachute), circa 1924.

On 27 June 1923 the 120th Aero Observation Squadron, 45th Division Aviation was mustered into service as part of the Colorado Army National Guard. Initially composed of eight officers and 50 enlisted members, the unit flew Curtiss JN-4Es (better known as Jennies) – an aircraft which proved to be unsuitable for flying at Denver elevations. One year later, the 120th began flying out of Lowry Field. The brand-new airfield was named in honor of 2nd Lt. Francis B. Lowry who was shot down and killed near Crepion, France in 1918 while on a photographic mission.

Nonetheless, the men of the 120th persevered flying the JN-4Es just before sunrise and after sunset, when the air was less turbulent. In later years, they would transition through a variety of more powerful observation aircraft such as the Douglas O-2, Consolidated O-17, and Douglas O-38. In 1935 the Squadron received the Thomas-Morse O-19, an improvement over prior planes, but still under-powered for mountain flying. Harry B. Combs joined the 120th in 1936 and flew the O-19 enough to gain his instructor's rating. The unit eventually started flying the O-47 – a three-seat, all-metal, single-engine aircraft – that took the unit into World War II.

Mobilization for World War II took place on 6 January 1941, 11 months prior to the bombing of Pearl Harbor. The unit, then 19 officers and 116 enlisted members, moved to Biggs Field, Texas.

During World War II the squadron supported ground units in training by flying reconnaissance, artillery adjustment, fighter, and bomber missions, and in the process trained reconnaissance personnel who later served overseas. The squadron patrolled the Mexican border from March–July 1942, and was disbanded on 30 November 1943.

=== Colorado Air National Guard ===
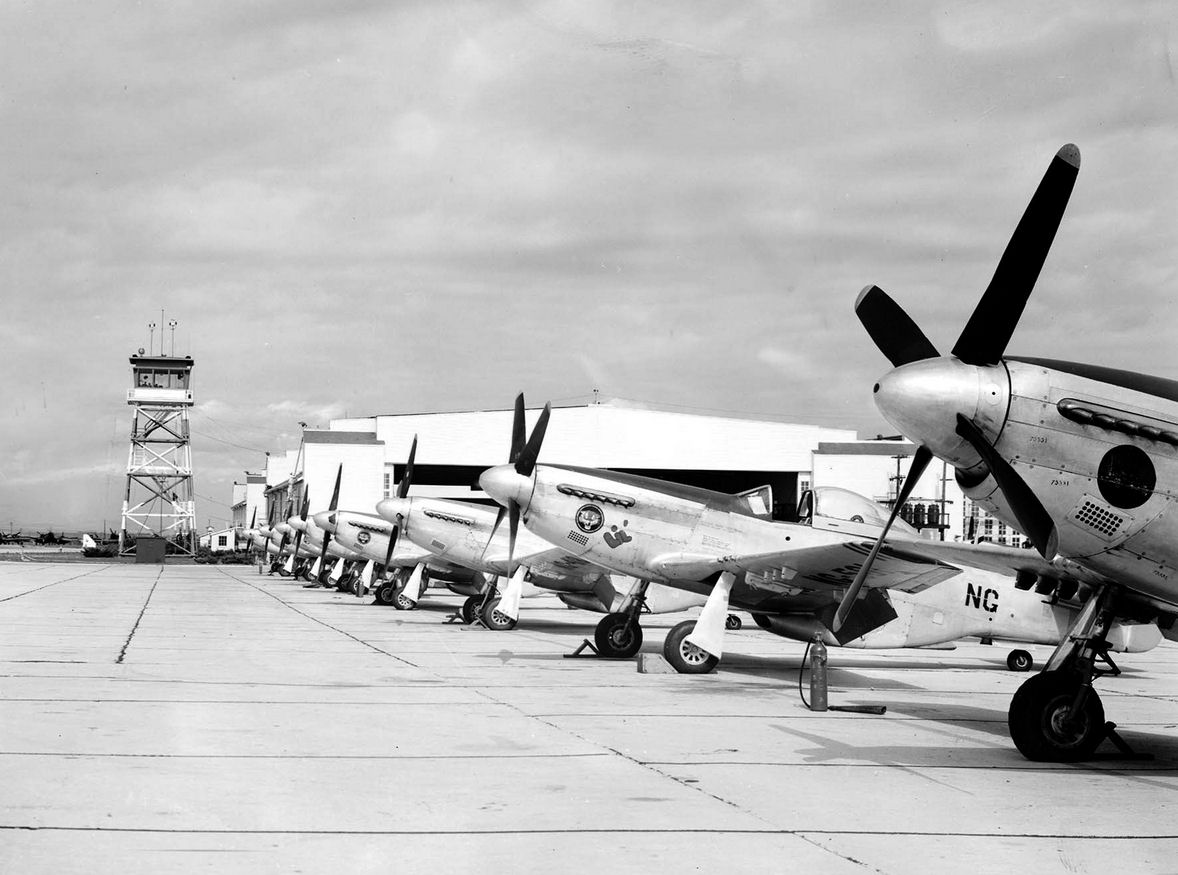
120th Fighter Squadron P-51 Mustangs, 1946

The 120th Tactical Reconnaissance Squadron was reconstituted on 21 June 1945. It was then redesignated the 120th Fighter Squadron and allotted to the Air National Guard on 24 May 1946. It was organized at Buckley Field (a sub-base of Lowry Air Force Base), Colorado and was extended federal recognition on 30 June 1946.

The 120th Squadron was the first Air National Guard unit to obtain federal recognition. It squadron was equipped with F-51D Mustangs and was assigned to the 140th Fighter Group, 86th Fighter Wing, Colorado Air National Guard. As part of the Continental Air Command Fourth Air Force, the unit trained for tactical fighter missions and air-to-air combat.

In 1947, shortly after World War II, the 120th organized an aerial demonstration team called the "Minute Men." This team was federally recognized in 1956, making it the first and only Air National Guard aerial demonstration team. Headed by Col. Walt Williams, the team performed in more than 100 air shows for more than three million people in 47 states and five foreign countries, before being disbanded in favor of a federal team of Air Force pilots, the U.S. Air Force Thunderbirds. The Minute Men flew the F-86F-2 GunVal version of the Sabre Jet.

==== Korean War activation ====
As a result of the Korean War, the 120th was federalized and brought to active duty on 1 April 1951. The unit was ordered to the new Clovis Air Force Base, New Mexico, which arrived in October 1951. The federalized 140th was a composite organization of activated Air National Guard units, composed of the 120th, the 187th Fighter Squadron (Wyoming ANG) and the 190th Fighter Squadron (Utah ANG). The 140th and its components were equipped with F-51D Mustangs, and were re-designated as Fighter-Bomber squadrons on 12 April 1951.

During their period of federal service, many pilots were sent to Japan and South Korea to reinforce active-duty units. At Clovis, elements of the 140th FBW took part in Operation Tumbler-Snapper, a 1952 nuclear bomb test in Nevada. On 15 November 1952, the elements of the 140th returned to Air National Guard control in their respective states.

==== Cold War ====
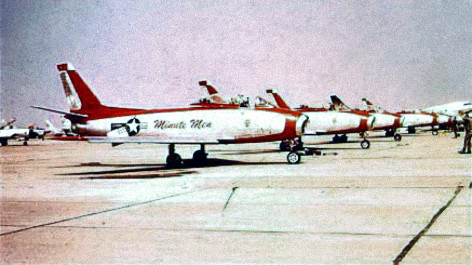
Minute Men aerobatics team c1958

Upon return to Colorado state control, the 120th was re-equipped with F-80C Shooting Star jets. On 1 July 1955, the squadron was re-designated as the 120th Fighter-Interceptor Squadron, with its parent 140th FIW being assigned to the 34th Air Division, Air Defense Command.

In 1958, the 140th FIW implemented the ADC Runway Alert Program, in which interceptors of the 120th Fighter-Interceptor Squadron were committed to a five-minute runway alert. In 1960 the F-86s were again replaced by the F-86L Sabre Interceptor, a day/night/all-weather aircraft designed to be integrated into the ADC SAGE interceptor direction and control system.

==== Tactical Air Command/Vietnam War ====
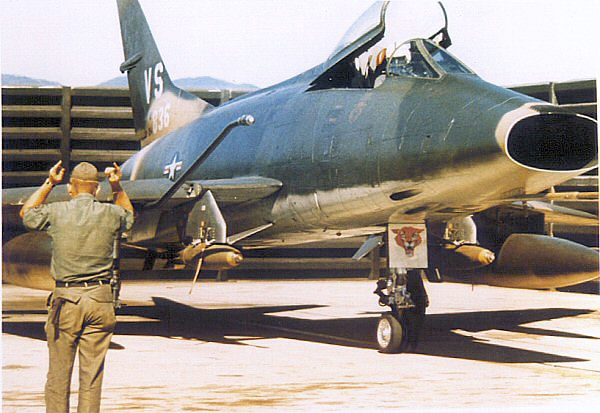
120th FS F-100C 54–1836 at Phan Rang AB, South Vietnam, 1968. Note Vietnam War Tail Code "VS"

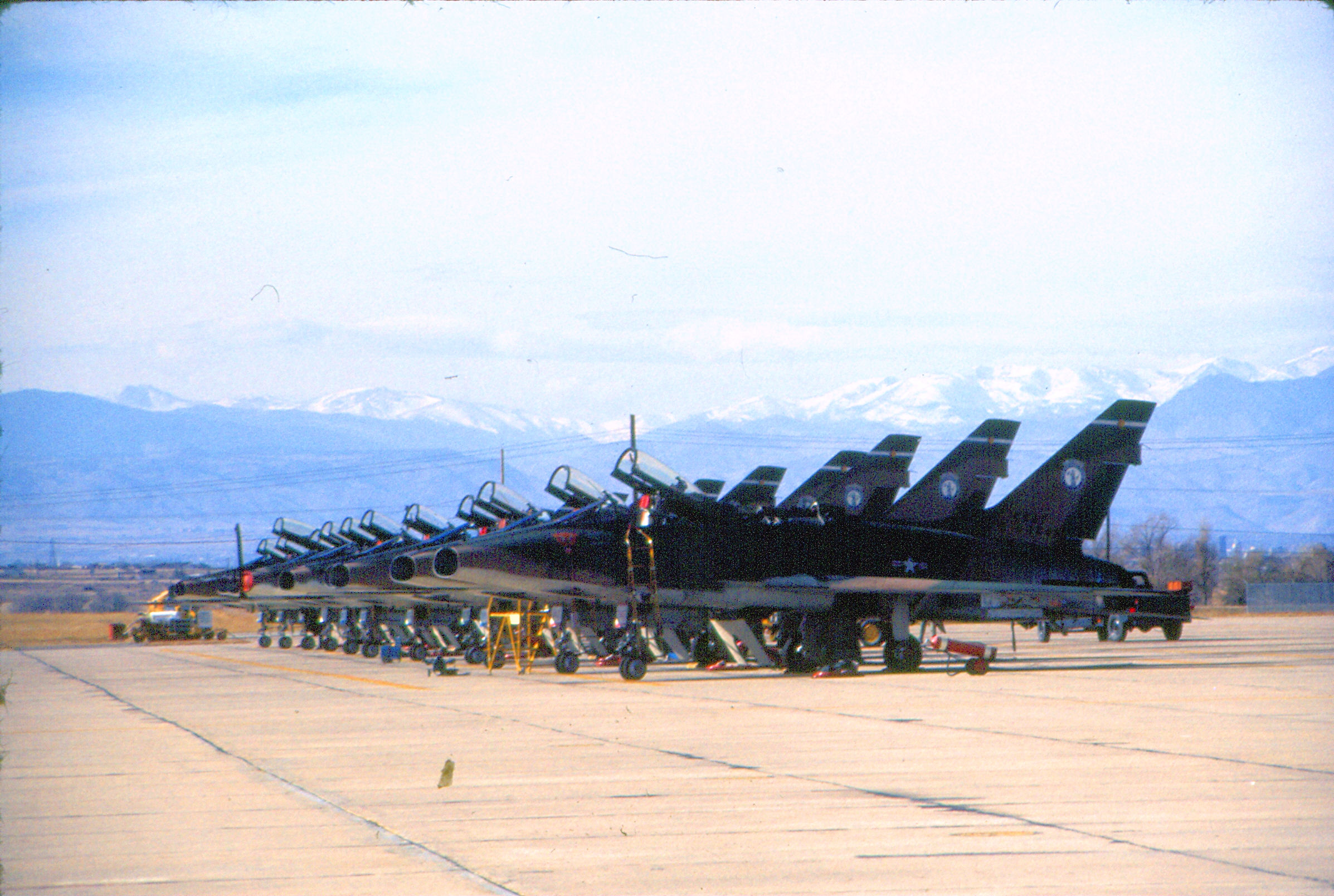
"D" Huns on the Buckley's flightline, Apr 1974

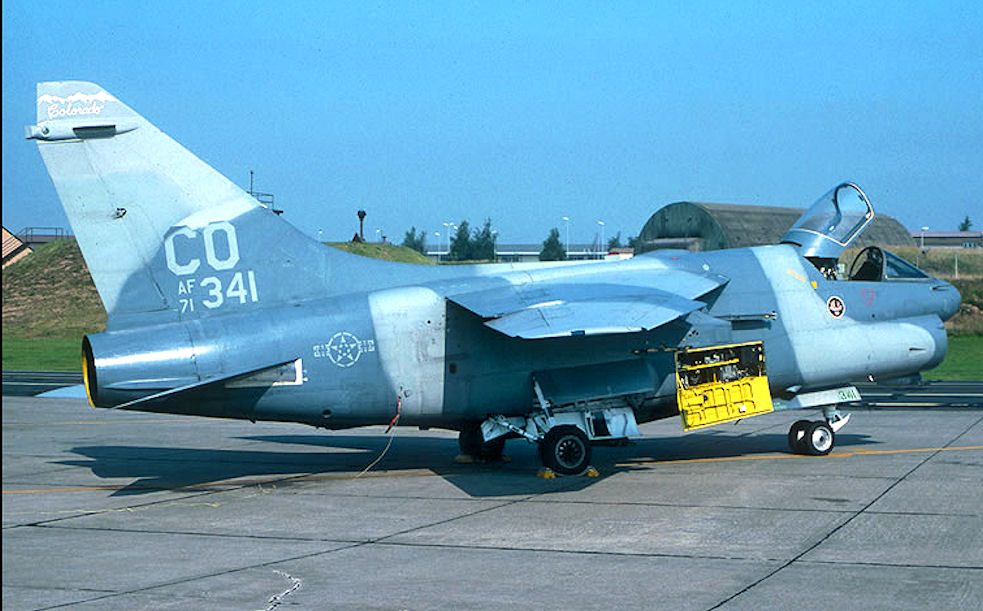
120th Tactical Fighter Squadron A-7D 71-341, about 1988

The 140th was transferred back to Tactical Air Command in January 1961, the squadron being re-designated as the 120th Tactical Fighter Squadron. In 1968, While flying the F-100C Super Sabre in South Vietnam, the unit became the first guard unit activated and deployed for one year to southeast Asia. As part of the 35th Tactical Fighter Wing, Phan Rang Air Base, the squadron flew primarily ground support missions, and beat back many enemy attacks on American and South Vietnamese ground units. The 140th also performed interdiction, visual and armed reconnaissance, strike assessment photography, escort, close and direct air support, and rapid reaction alert.

The 120th earned the United States Air Force Outstanding Unit Award with the combat "V" device during the conflict by flying over 6,000 combat missions. After returning from Vietnam, the Guard was upgraded with the D-model of the F-100 Super Sabre.

The LTV A-7D Corsair II replaced the F-100 in April 1974 and the aircraft was flown to victory as the "World Champions" in the inaugural Gunsmoke competition held at Nellis Air Force Base in 1981.

The 120th converted to the Lockheed-Martin F-16C Fighting Falcon in 1992 and won the Air Force Association award for the Outstanding Air National Guard Unit in 2001.

==== Current operations ====
The A-7Ds were operated until March 1992 when the Wing converted to Block 30 F-16C/Ds Fighting Falcons, and the Corsairs were retired to Davis-Monthan AFB.

Today the 120th is a dual-purpose fighter squadron with pilots qualified to perform air-to-air and air-to-ground missions including offensive and defensive counter-air, interdiction, close air support, and combat search and rescue missions. With the addition of the Litening II and Sniper targeting pod and the latest software upgrades, pilots of the 120th are able to employ precision guided GPS and laser-guided weapons with high accuracy.

The 120th Fighter Squadron has participated in many exercises when not deployed to support real world contingency operations as part of the United States Air Force's Total Force. These exercises include joint multi-national training with the Royal Australian Air Force in Australia, TEAM SPIRIT in Korea, Tactical Fighter Weaponry in Denmark, Maple Flag in Canada, Cope Thunder in Alaska, Sentry Aloha in Hawaii, the joint CRUZEX V operational exercise (Cruzeiro do sul – Southern Cross) in Brazil in 2010, with the Brazilian Air Force, the Armée de l'Air (French Air and Space Force), and many others air forces from South America, and observers from other countries of the NATO, and many other exercises within the United States.

In February 2003, the 120th mobilized and deployed to a classified location just outside of Iraq's borders, in support of Operation Iraqi Freedom. Researchers have since located the site as Azraq AB, Jordan, with the 410th Air Expeditionary Wing. While deployed with sixteen aircraft and over 30 pilots, the 120th flew over 500 combat sorties, 2500 hours and dropped over 350 precision guided weapons while preventing the launch of any ballistic missiles in their area of responsibility.

All personnel and jets returned safely during the summer of 2003. The unit has since redeployed to Iraq in the summer of 2004, as well as during the holidays in 2007–2008, and in the summer of 2009 in support of Operation Iraqi Freedom.

In 2005, the 120th won back the "Spirit Trophy" in the Tiger Meet of the Americas Competition. The 120th is an honorary member of the NATO Tiger Association.

== Lineage ==
120th Aero Squadron
Organized as the 120th Aero Squadron on 28 August 1917
Redesignated 120th Aero Squadron (Service) on 1 September 1917
Demobilized on 17 May 1919
Reconstituted and consolidated with the 120th Observation Squadron in 1936

120th Fighter Squadron

- Constituted as the 120th Observation Squadron

Activated on 27 June 1923
Consolidated with the 120th Aero Squadron in 1936
Ordered to active service on 6 January 1941
Redesignated 120th Observation Squadron (Medium) on 13 January 1942
Redesignated 120th Observation Squadron on 4 July 1942
Redesignated 120th Reconnaissance Squadron (Fighter) on 2 April 1943
Redesignated 120th Tactical Reconnaissance Squadron on 11 August 1943
Disbanded on 30 November 1943
Reconstituted on 21 June 1945
Redesignated 120th Fighter Squadron and allotted to the National Guard on 24 May 1946
Extended federal recognition on 30 June 1946
Federalized and placed on active duty on 1 April 1951
Redesignated 120th Fighter-Bomber Squadron on 12 April 1951
Released from active duty and returned to Colorado state control on 15 November 1952
Redesignated 120th Fighter-Interceptor Squadron on 1 July 1960
Redesignated 120th Tactical Fighter Squadron on 1 January 1961
Federalized and placed on active duty on 26 January 1968
Released from active duty and returned to Colorado state control on 30 April 1969
Redesignated 120th Fighter Squadron on 15 March 1992

=== Assignments ===
- Post Headquarters, Kelly Field, 28 August-10 November 1917
- Post Headquarters, Ellington Field, 10 November 1917 – 3 February 1918
- Aviation Concentration Center, 3–16 February 1918
- Chief of Air Service, American Expeditionary Force, 9 March-16 September 1918 (attached to Royal Flying Corps for training)
- Replacement Concentration Center, American Expeditionary Force, 6–17 September 1918
- Second Aviation Instruction Center, American Expeditionary Force, 17 September 1918 – 6 February 1919
- Post Headquarters, Mitchel Field, 7–17 May 1919
- Colorado National Guard (divisional aviation, 45th Division), 27 June 1923
- Third Army, 6 January 1941
- III Air Support Command, 1 September 1941
- 77th Observation (later Reconnaissance, Tactical Reconnaissance) Group, 12 March 1942 – 30 November 1943
- 140th Fighter Group (later 140th Fighter-Bomber Group, 140th Fighter-Interceptor Group, 140th Fighter Group (Air Defense), 140th Tactical Fighter Group), 1 October 1946
- 35th Tactical Fighter Wing, 26 January 1968
- 140th Tactical Fighter Group, 30 April 1969
- 140th Tactical Fighter Wing, 30 June 1974
- 140th Operations Group, 15 March 1992 – present

=== Stations ===
- Kelly Field, Texas, 28 August 1917
- Ellington Field, Texas, c. 10 November 1917
- Aviation Concentration Center, Garden City, New York, 3–16 Feb 1918
- RFC New Romney, Kent, England, 9 March 1918
- RFC Stamford, Cambridgeshire, England, c. 10-c. 27 August 1918 (detachmentd at RFC New Romney, England and RFC Crail, Scotland)
- St. Maixent Replacement Barracks, France, 6 September 1918
- Tours Aerodrome, France, 17 September 1918
- Port of embarkation, France, c. Feb 1919-unknown
- Mitchell Field, New York, c. 7–17 May 1919
- Denver, Colorado, 27 June 1923
- Biggs Field, Texas, 15 January 1941

Flight operated from Laredo Army Airfield, Texas, 10 Feb-4 Jul 1942

- DeRidder Army Air Base, Louisiana, 26 July 1942
- Biggs Field, Texas, 26 September 1942
- Abilene Army Air Field, Texas, 28 June 1943
- Esler Field, Louisiana, 13 September 1943
- Birmingham Army Air Field, Alabama, 14–30 Nov 1943
- Buckley Field, Colorado 30 June 1946
- Clovis Air Force Base (later Cannon Air Force Base], New Mexico, 12 April 1951
- Buckley Field (later Buckley Air National Guard Base), Colorado, 1 January 1953
- Phan Rang Air Base, South Vietnam, 3 May 1968
- Buckley Air National Guard Base (later Buckley Air Force Base, Buckley Space Force Base, 30 April 1969 – present

=== Aircraft ===
- In addition to O-2, c. 1927–1934
- Included JN-4, PT-1, BT-1, O-17, and O-38 during period 1924–1935
- Thomas-Morse O-19, 1935–1939
- North American O-47, 1938–1943
- P-39 Airacobra, 1942–1943
- O-49 Vigilant, 1941–1943
- P-40 Warhawk, 1942–1943
- L-4 Grasshopper, 1942–1943
- F-51D Mustang, 1946–1953
- F-80C Shooting Star, 1953–1958
- F-86E Sabre, 1958–1960
- F-86L Sabre Interceptor, 1960–1961
- F-100C/F Super Sabre, 1961–1971
- F-100D/F Super Sabre, 1971–1974
- A-7D/K Corsair II, 1974–1992
- F-16C/D Fighting Falcon, 1992–Present

== See also ==
- List of American aero squadrons
- List of observation squadrons of the United States Army National Guard
