= Keith Colmer =

American test pilot (born 1967)

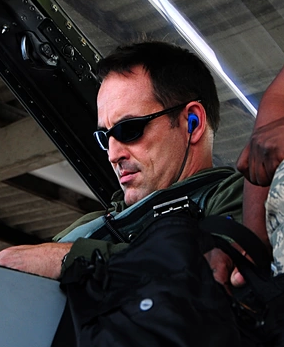
- Colmer in F-16 cockpit
- Born: January 1, 1967 (age 59); United States
- Education: Massachusetts Institute of Technology (SB); University of Colorado Boulder (MS, MS); United States Air Force Test Pilot School (MS)
- Space career

Commercial astronaut
- Selection: Virgin Galactic pilot selection (2011)
- Missions: GF-21 (VSS Enterprise, 2012)
- Military career
- Allegiance: USA
- Branch: United States Air Force
- Rank: Colonel

Keith Colmer (born January 1, 1967), known by the call sign Coma, is an American aerospace engineer and test pilot. In 2011, he was selected by Virgin Galactic as the company's first astronaut pilot, and in 2012 he piloted VSS Enterprise on the GF-21 suborbital test flight.

== Early life and education ==
Colmer earned a Bachelor of Science in aeronautics and astronautics from the Massachusetts Institute of Technology in 1989. After graduating, he worked in the Air Force Space Command as a satellite engineer on the Global Positioning System (GPS) constellation. He subsequently earned two master's degrees from the University of Colorado Boulder, one in aerospace engineering in 1996, and one in telecommunications engineering in 2001.

He is a graduate of the U.S. Air Force Undergraduate Space Training program and the Euro-NATO Joint Jet Pilot Training Program and completed United States Air Force Test Pilot School in 2002 as a member of Class 02A. In 2014, he attended the National Security Studies Program at the George Washington University.

== Military career ==
He worked at the National Reconnaissance Office (NRO) from 1995 to 1997 as a spacecraft mission planner. After completing USAF pilot training, Colmer became a test pilot for the AN/AAQ-28 Litening targeting pod and assisted in installing them on Boeing B-52 Stratofortress aircraft at Edwards Air Force Base. He flew the General Dynamics F-16 Fighting Falcon as a combat pilot with the Colorado Air National Guard, deploying twice to Iraq in 2008. He was later selected as an operational test pilot, overseeing sensor and electronic warfare flight test programs for the F-16 at the Air National Guard/Air Force Reserve Command Test Center (AATC) in Tucson, Arizona.

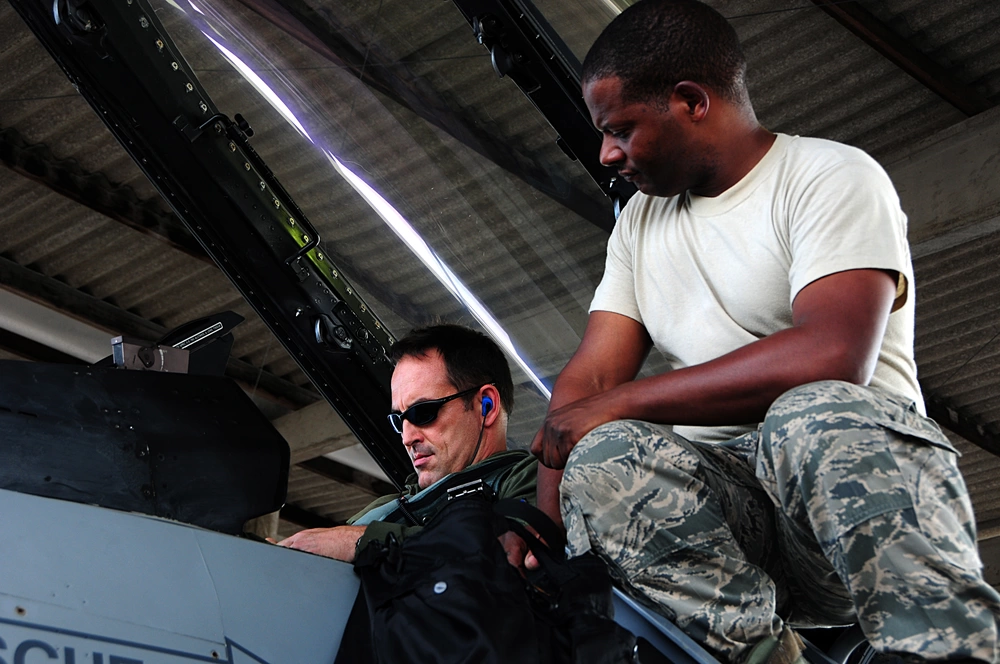
Colmer preparing an F-16 for flight with Staff Sgt. Ronald Byron during CRUZEX in 2013

Colmer became the first Air National Guard pilot selected to attend the USAF Test Pilot School at Edwards Air Force Base, California. He went on to serve as Operations Officer of the 416th Flight Test Squadron at Edwards, directing flight test work on the F-16, F-15, and T-38C, with a focus on high-angle of attack testing of the F-16. He then completed two classified assignments, ending his active-duty career as a Combined Test Force Director and squadron commander on a classified program. In 2013, he also participated in CRUZEX at Natal Air Force Base in Brazil. Colmer retired as a colonel.

His awards include the Order of Daedalians' Orville Wright Achievement Award, given to him in 1989 as the top graduate of his pilot training class, the Aaron C. George Award from the USAF Test Pilot School, the Lieutenant General Bobby Bond Memorial Aviator Award, and the Lieutenant General Howard W. Leaf "Test Team of the Year" award. He sits on the advisory board for UPRT. Colmer presented at the Armed Forces Communications and Electronics Association (AFCEA) in 2013.

== Virgin Galactic career ==
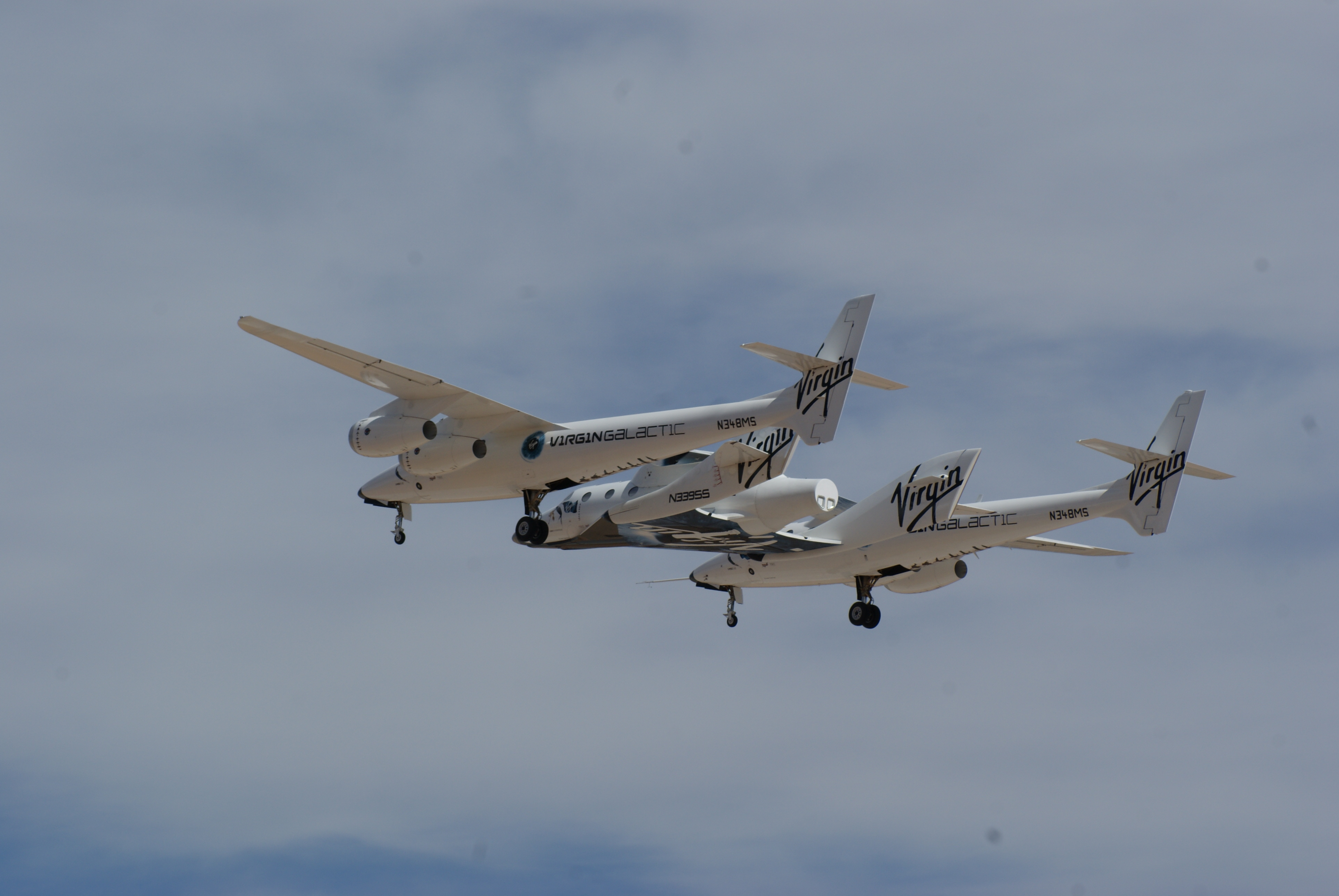
White Knight Two and VSS Enterprise mated during flight

In 2011, Virgin Galactic chose Colmer as its first commercial astronaut pilot selected through a competitive process, from a pool of more than 500 applicants. At the time of his selection, he had logged over 5,100 flight hours across more than 90 aircraft types, and had accumulated twelve years of test flight experience on operational, developmental, and experimental aircraft. He joined Chief Pilot David Mackay on Virgin Galactic's flight team, reporting to Mackay and Vice President of Operations Mike Moses as the company moved toward powered test flights. Then-CEO George Whitesides cited Colmer's broad skill set and record of performance under demanding conditions as reasons for his selection.

Colmer, whose call sign is "Coma," was based with the flight test team in Mojave, California, working alongside Scaled Composites test pilots who had been conducting the flight test campaign for Whight Knight Two and SpaceShipTwo. In 2012, he flew as a pilot on the GF-21 glide flight of VSS Enterprise, logging a flight time of 14 minutes and 30 seconds.

== Gulfstream Aerospace and retirement ==
Colmer joined Gulfstream Aerospace in October 2016 as an experimental test pilot for the Gulfstream G650/G700/G800 and Gulfstream G500/G600 aircraft. In April 2019, he served as vice president of flight operations for the company before retiring in 2023.
