= South America air forces maneuvers =

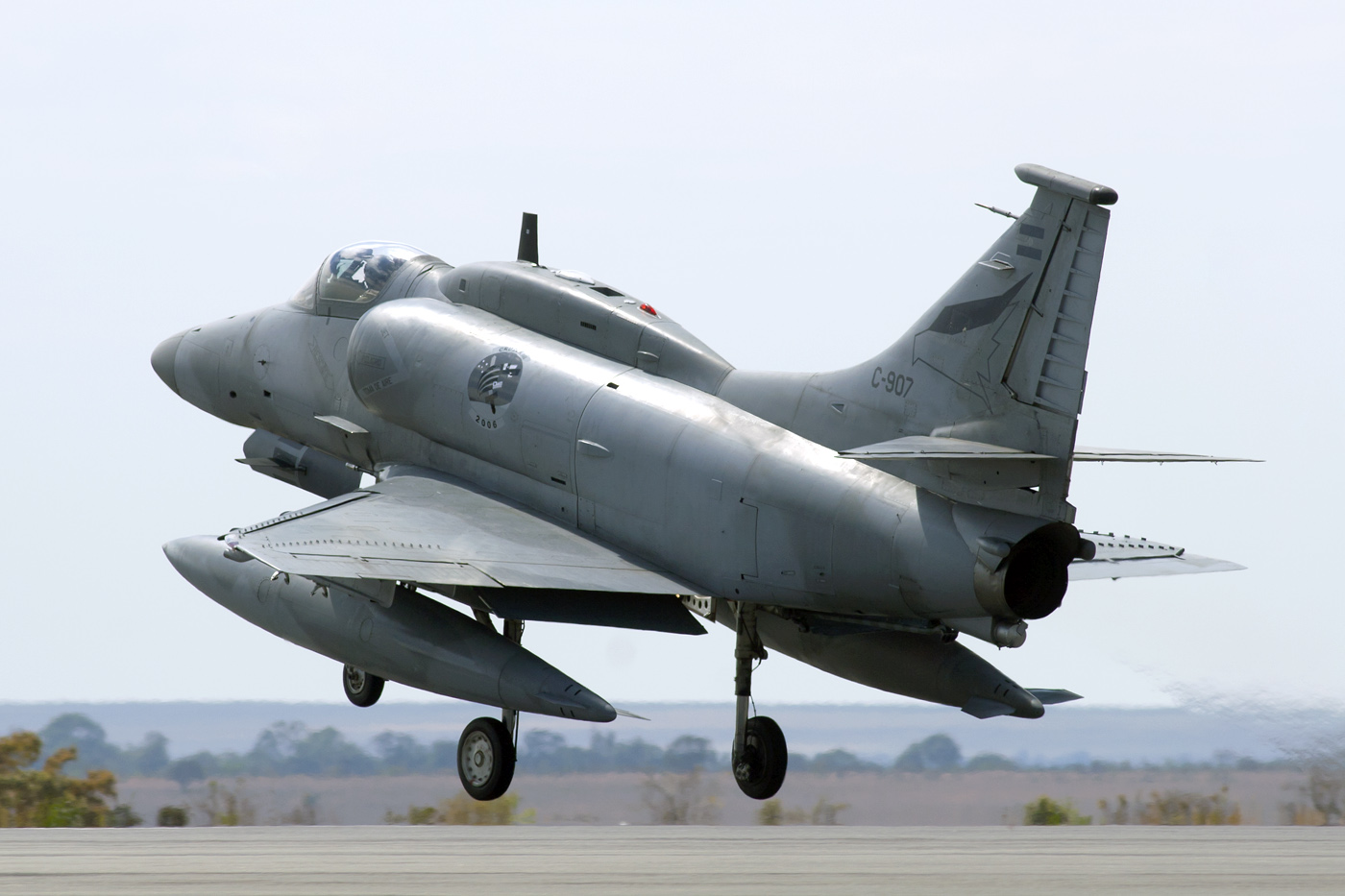
A-4AR Fighting Hawk during the 2006 Cruzex exercise

The South American air forces performs several joint aerial combat training exercises. Among the more important are CRUZEX (Portuguese: Exercício Cruzeiro do Sul) which is hosted by the Brazilian Air Force, salitre (English: Saltpeter) hosted by the Chilean Air Force and ceibo (English: Erythrina crista-galli flower) hosted by the Argentine Air Force. The goal is to train together in order to respond to a crisis or integrate into United Nations peacekeeping operations as a unified team; the United States Air Force and the Royal Canadian Air Force have also participated in some of these exercises in recent years.

The exercises include combat search and rescue, aerial refueling and combined air operations center training opportunities focused on interoperability.

== List of operations ==
All helicopters are normally provided by the host nation and all the participants include different types of support aircraft.

Operation	Date	Air bases	Participants	Observers	Notes	Ref
Cruzex I	Further information: CRUZEX					
Cruzex II	Further information: CRUZEX					
Salitre I	2004 26 Sep/10 Oct	Cerro Moreno; Iquique	(Chile) Mirage 50 Pantera, Mirage 5 Elkan, F-5 Tiger III, A-37B Dragonfly, EB-707 Cóndor, KB-707 Águila, LR-35 Learjet, C-212 Aviocar (Argentina) Mirage III, Mirage 5 Mara, B-707, L-300 Hercules (Brazil) F-5 Tiger II, KC-137 (United States) F-16C/D Fighting Falcon, KC-135 Stratotanker		57 aircraft	
Ceibo 2005	2005 Nov	El Plumerillo; Villa Reynolds	(Argentina) Mirage III, Mirage 5 Mara, A-4AR Fighting Hawk (Brazil) A-1 Falcao (Chile) Mirage 50 Pantera (Uruguay) A-37B Dragonfly		45 aircraft	
Cruzex III	Further information: CRUZEX					
Cruzex IV	Further information: CRUZEX					
Salitre II	2009 19-30/Oct	Cerro Moreno; Iquique	(Chile) F-16C/D Fighting Falcon, F-16AM/BM Fighting Falcon, F-5 Tiger III, EB-707 Cóndor, KB-707 Águila, Beech 99A Petrel, C-212 Aviocar (Argentina) A-4AR Fighting Hawk, KC-130 Hercules (Brazil) A-1 Falcao, KC-130 Hercules (United States) F-15C Eagle, KC-135 Stratotaker, HC-130 Hercules, C-130 Hercules (France) Mirage 2000, E-3F Sentry, KC-135 Stratotanker	(Ecuador) (Paraguay) (Venezuela)	59 aircraft and helicopters. The exercise was criticized by Peru	
Cooperación I	2010 4-15/Oct	Chile	(Chile) C-130 Hercules, DHC-6 Twin Otter, C-212 Aviocar, CJ-1, UH-60 Black Hawk, Bell 412, UH-1H Iroquois (Brazil) UH-60 Black Hawk (Canada) C-130 Hercules (Colombia) C-130 Hercules (Peru) L-100 Hercules, Bell 212 (United States) C-130 Hercules	(Argentina) (Bolivia) (Ecuador) (Panama) (Paraguay) (Dominican Republic) (Uruguay)	Natural disasters relief training official video	
Cruzex V	Further information: CRUZEX					
Cruzex VI	Further information: CRUZEX					
Cooperación III	2014 23 Apr/1 May	Perú	(Peru) L-100 Hercules, Mi-8 Hip, Bell 212 (Argentina) C-130 Hercules (Brazil) C-295 Amazonas, UH-60 Black Hawk (Canada) CC-130J Super Hercules, CH-149 Cormorant (Chile) C-130 Hercules (Colombia) C-295, Beech 350 King Air (Uruguay) C-130 Hercules, UH-1H Iroquois (United States) C-130 Hercules	(Guatemala) (Mexico) (Paraguay) (Dominican Republic)	Natural disasters relief training	
Salitre III	2014 6-17/Oct	Cerro Moreno; Iquique	(Chile) F-16C/D Fighting Falcon, F-16AM/BM Fighting Falcon, F-5 Tiger III (Argentina) A-4AR Fighting Hawk (Brazil) F-5EM/FM Tiger II, KC-130 Hercules (United States) F-16C/D Fighting Falcon, KC-135 Stratotaker (Uruguay) A-37B Dragonfly		51 aircraft	
Cruzex 2018	Further information: CRUZEX					
Cruzex 2024	Further information: CRUZEX					

== See also ==
- Organization of American States
- Inter-American Treaty of Reciprocal Assistance
- System of Cooperation Among the American Air Forces
- Gringo-Gaucho
