= Augusto Severo International Airport =

Former commercial airport that served Natal, Rio Grande do Norte, Brazil

Augusto Severo International Airport Aeroporto Internacional Augusto Severo
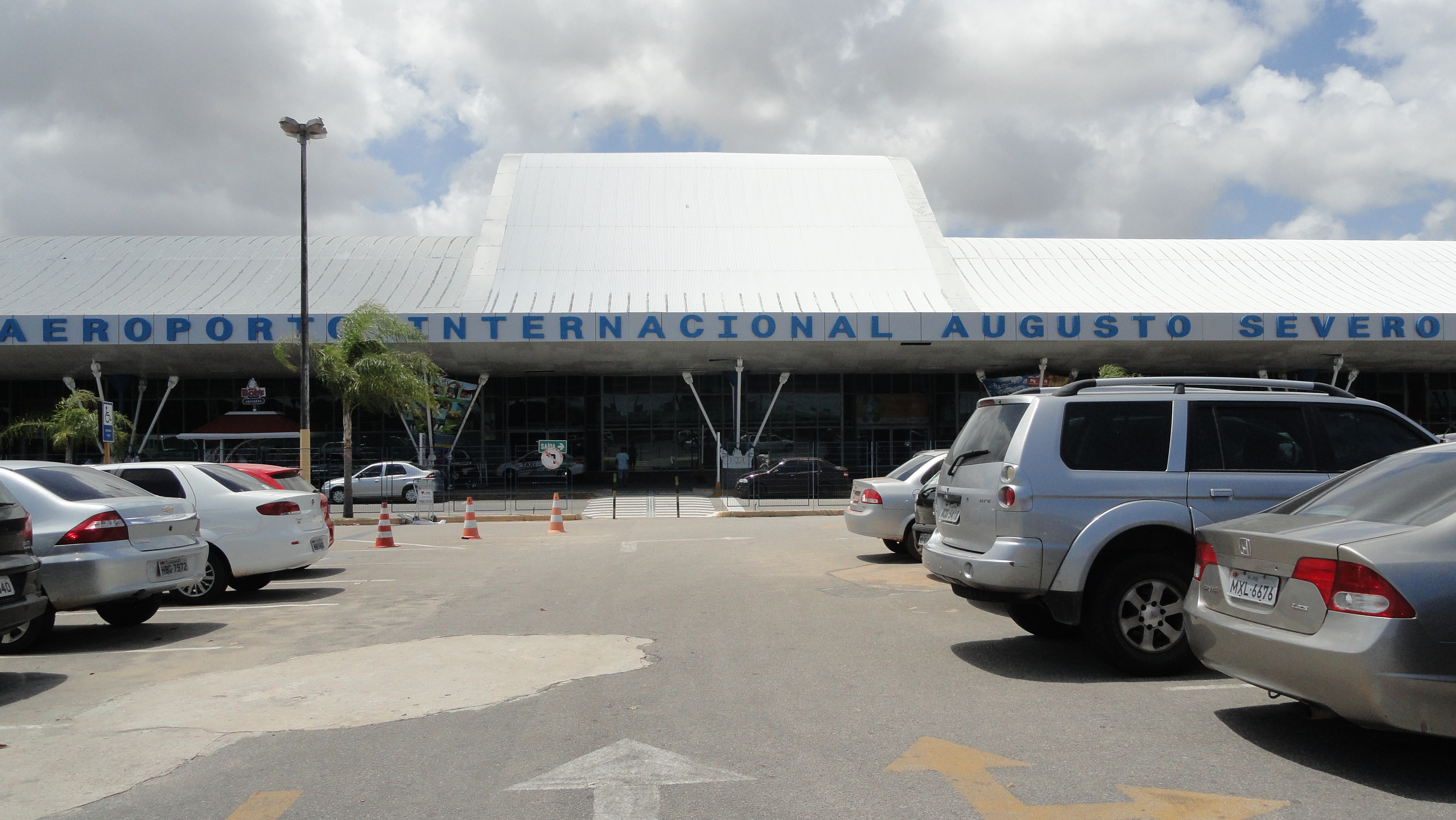
- IATA: ~~NAT~~; ICAO: SBNT

Summary
- Airport type: Military
- Operator: Infraero (1980–2014)
- Serves: Natal
- Location: Parnamirim, Brazil
- Passenger services ceased: 30 May 2014
- Elevation AMSL: 52 m / 171 ft
- Coordinates: 05°54′30″S 035°14′57″W

Map
- Location in Brazil

Runways
Direction	Length		Surface
Direction	m	ft	Surface
16L/34R	2,600	8,530	Asphalt
16R/34L	1,800	5,905	Asphalt
12/30	1,825	5,987	Asphalt
- Sources: Airport Website, ANAC

Augusto Severo International Airport (IATA: ~~NAT~~, ICAO: SBNT), originally called Parnamirim Airport, was the civilian airport that served Natal, Brazil, located in the adjoining municipality of Parnamirim. Starting on November 24, 1951, the airport was named after the aviator Augusto Severo de Albuquerque Maranhão (1864-1902).

On May 31, 2014, domestic flights were moved to the new Gov. Aluízio Alves International Airport. International flights were moved days later and Augusto Severo was closed for civil aviation. The IATA code NAT was transferred to the new airport.

Some of its facilities were shared with the Natal Air Force Base of the Brazilian Air Force.

== History ==
Before World War II Air France operated a mail service with flying boats and landplanes across the Atlantic from Dakar which routed via Natal. Parnamirim was a combination land and marine aerodrome also used by Pan American World Airways and Panair do Brasil flying boats. In 1940 and 1941 the Italian airline L.A.T.I. operated a weekly landplane service from Rome to Rio de Janeiro via Recife (mainly southbound) and Natal (mainly northbound) using Savoia-Marchetti tri-motor landplanes until the aircraft were impounded and the service stopped as a result of the intervention of the British secret services in the Americas around the time of the Attack on Pearl Harbor.

The aerodrome gained an important role during World War II as a strategic base for aircraft flying between South America and West Africa. Particularly between 1943 and 1945, this facility was used jointly by the Brazilian Air Force, United States Army, United States Navy, the Royal Air Force, and commercial airlines. The maintenance and security installations were made by the U.S. Army in the South Atlantic (USAFSA).

On July 21, 1953, within a law prescribing rules for the naming of airports, the name of the facility was officially and exceptionally maintained as Augusto Severo Airport.

On 31 March 1980, the Ministry of Aeronautics transferred to state-owned airport administrator Infraero the task of managing the airport. On the same date major renovations were completed.

In 2000, a modern passenger terminal was built. The terminal was 11,560 m^{2} (124,431 sq.ft.), had four jet bridges, and was capable of handling 1.5 million passengers annually.

On 31 August 2009, Infraero unveiled an ambitious BRL5.3 billion (US$2.8 billion; EUR2.0 billion) investment plan to renovate and upgrade airports of ten cities focusing on the preparations for the 2014 FIFA World Cup, which was going to be held in Brazil. On that occasion, it was announced that even though Natal was one of the venue cities, the plan did not include Augusto Severo airport because renovations had been recently completed, and Infraero considered the airport fit to handle the forthcoming increase in traffic.

However, the capacity of the airport did not meet the demand of passengers, so the brand-new Greater Natal International Airport was built at the nearby town of São Gonçalo do Amarante.

On 31 May 2014, the last domestic flight took-off and domestic operations were moved to the new facility. International flights were moved a few days later. However, during June 2014 the terminal was still used for operations related to the 2014 FIFA World Cup.

The facilities of Augusto Severo are now used exclusivelly by Natal Air Force Base.

The following airlines served the airport at the time of closure: Arkefly, Avianca Brasil, Azul Brazilian Airlines, Gol Airlines, TAM Airlines, and TAP Portugal.

== Statistics ==
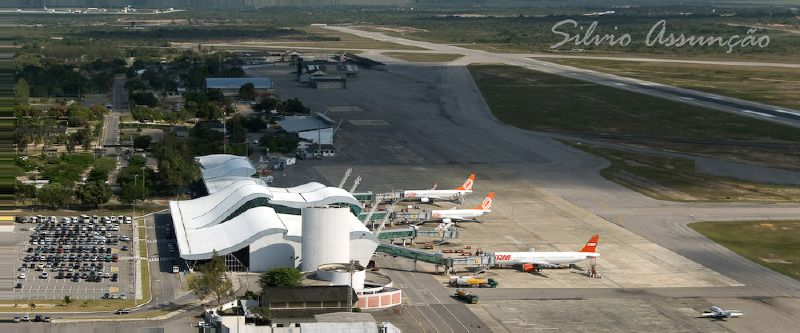
Aerial view of the terminal building

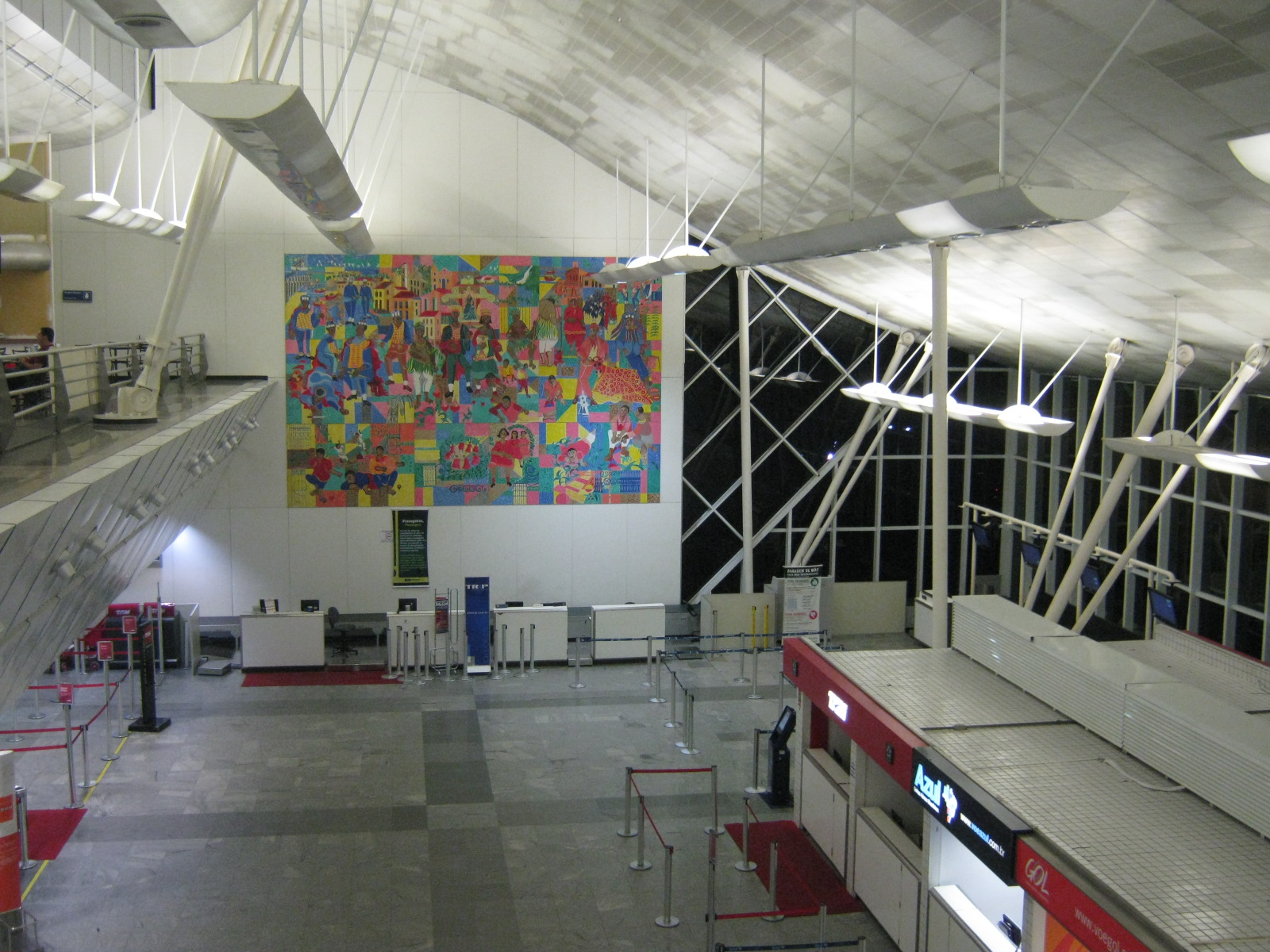
Check-in hall

Following are the number of passenger, aircraft and cargo movements at the airport, according to Infraero reports:

Year	Passenger	Aircraft	Cargo (t)
2014^{a}	1,021,147	10,779	4,379
2013	2,408,206 ▼9%	25,020 ▼11%	10,430 ▲37%
2012	2,660,864 ▲3%	28,108 ▼7%	7,594 ▲18%
2011	2,586,220 ▲7%	30,315 ▲6%	6,419 ▼9%
2010	2,415,833 ▲28%	28,623 ▲24%	7,049 ▼1%
2009	1,894,113 ▲15%	23,015 ▲14%	7,099 ▼16%
2008	1,643,369 ▲4%	20,246 ▼3%	8,442 ▼13%
2007	1,578,165	20,772	9,693

Note:
^{a}: Until June, when all civilian operations at the aerodrome ceased.

== Accidents and incidents ==
- 11 June 1947: Flota Aérea Mercante Argentina, an Avro 691 Lancastrian registration LV-ACS flying from Buenos Aires to Natal struck a post on landing and caught fire. Of the 18 passengers and crew, 13 survived.

== Access ==
The airport was located 18 km (11 mi) from downtown Natal.

== See also ==
- Natal Air Force Base
