= RAF New Romney =

Former Royal Air Force Advanced Landing Ground in Kent, England

RAF New Romney RAF Honeychild
- Near New Romney, Kent in England
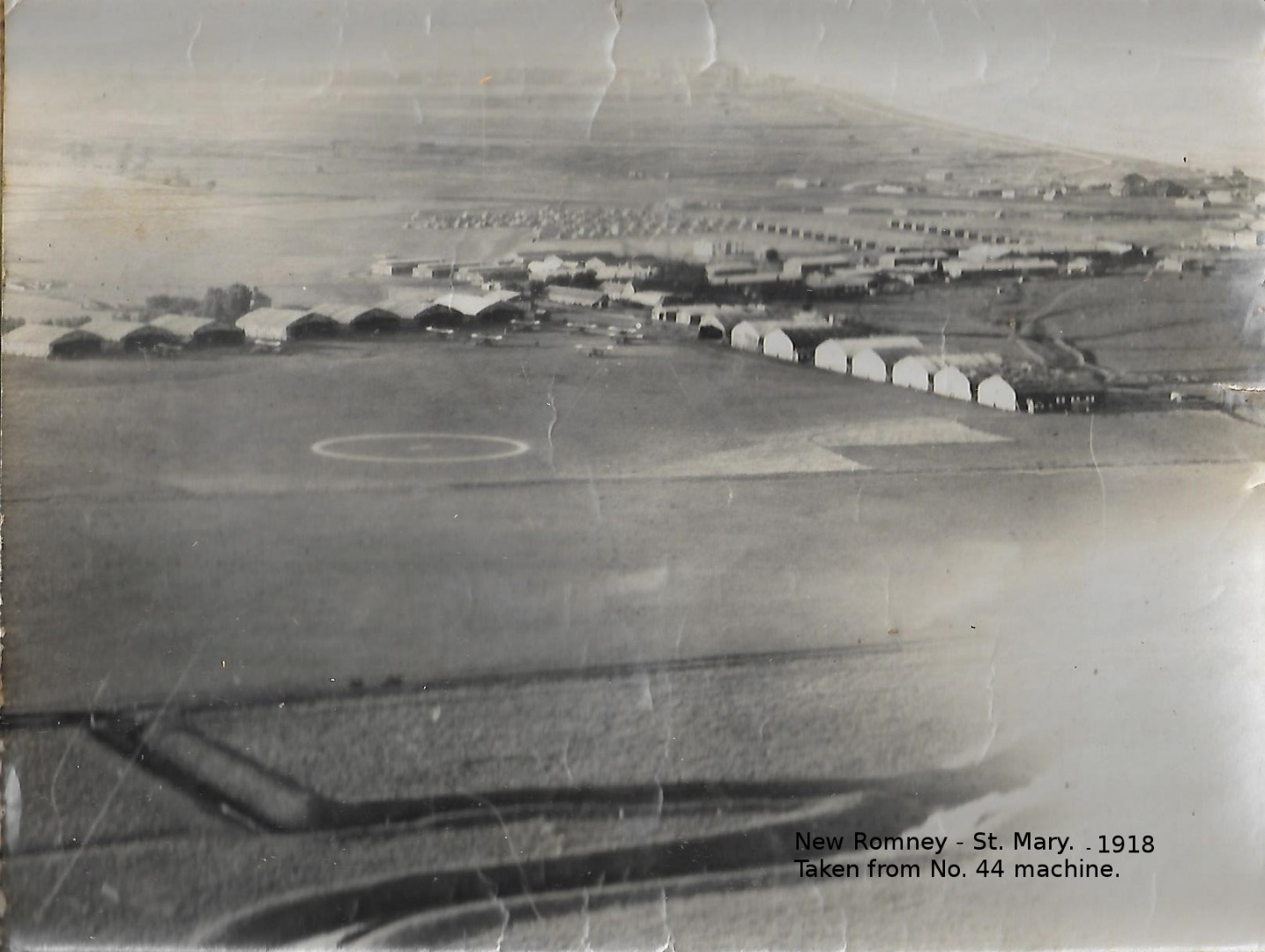
- RAF New Romney airfield, 1943

Site information
- Type: RAF Advanced landing ground
- Code: XR
- Owner: Air Ministry
- Operator: Royal Air Force
- Controlled by: RAF Fighter Command * No. 83 Group RAF

Location
- Shown within Kent RAF New Romney (the United Kingdom)
- Coordinates: 51°00′09″N 000°56′39″E

Site history
- Built: 1942/43
- Built by: RAF Airfield Construction Service
- In use: March 1943 – December 1944
- Battles/wars: European theatre of World War II

Airfield information
- Elevation: 3 metres (10 ft) AMSL
Runways
Direction	Length and surface
00/00	Sommerfeld tracking
00/00	Sommerfeld tracking

Royal Air Force New Romney or more simply RAF New Romney is a former Royal Air Force Advanced landing ground located 3.9 miles (6.3 km) north east of Lydd, Kent, England.

== History ==
Units:

- No. 124 Airfield Headquarters RAF
- No. 181 Squadron RAF flying Hawker Typhoon IB's from 3 July 1943 until 8 October 1943
- No. 182 Squadron RAF flying Hawker Typhoon IB's from 2 July 1943 until 12 October 1943 with a detachment at RAF Wigtown
- No. 247 (China-British) Squadron RAF flying Hawker Typhoon IB's firstly from 10 July 1943 until 7 August 1943 then again from 13 August 1943 until 11 October 1943
- No. 3207 Servicing Commando
- No. 3209 Servicing Commando

== Current use ==
The site is now used for farming and little remains of the landing ground.

== See also ==
- List of former Royal Air Force stations
- Advanced landing ground
