= Natal Air Force Base =

Air base of the Brazilian Air Force

- Base Aérea de Natal
- Parnamirim, Rio Grande do Norte in Brazil
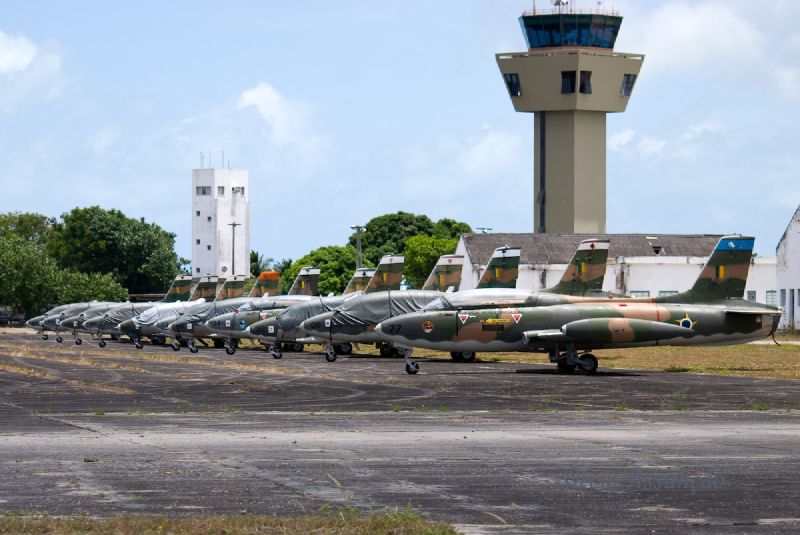
- A line of AT-26 Xavante at Natal in 2008

Site information
- Type: Air Force Base
- Code: ALA10
- Owner: Brazilian Air Force
- Controlled by: Brazilian Air Force
- Open to the public: No
- Website: www.fab.mil.br/organizacoes/mostra/44/

Location
- Location in Brazil
- Coordinates: 05°54′30″S 035°14′57″W

Site history
- In use: 1942-present

Garrison information
- Current commander: Brig. Av. Marcelo Fornasiari Rivero
- Occupants: 1st Squadron of the 5th Aviation Group; 2nd Squadron of the 5th Aviation Group; 1st Squadron of the 8th Aviation Group; 1st Squadron of the 11th Aviation Group; 2nd Squadron of Air Transportation; 3rd Squadron of the 1st Communications and Control Group

Airfield information
- Identifiers: ICAO: SBNT, LID: RN9001
- Elevation: 51 metres (167 ft) AMSL
Runways
Direction	Length and surface
16L/34R	2,600 metres (8,530 ft) Asphalt
16R/34L	1,800 metres (5,906 ft) Asphalt
12/30	1,825 metres (5,988 ft) Asphalt

Natal Air Force Base – ALA10 (ICAO: SBNT) is a base of the Brazilian Air Force, located in Parnamirim, near Natal, Brazil.

== History ==
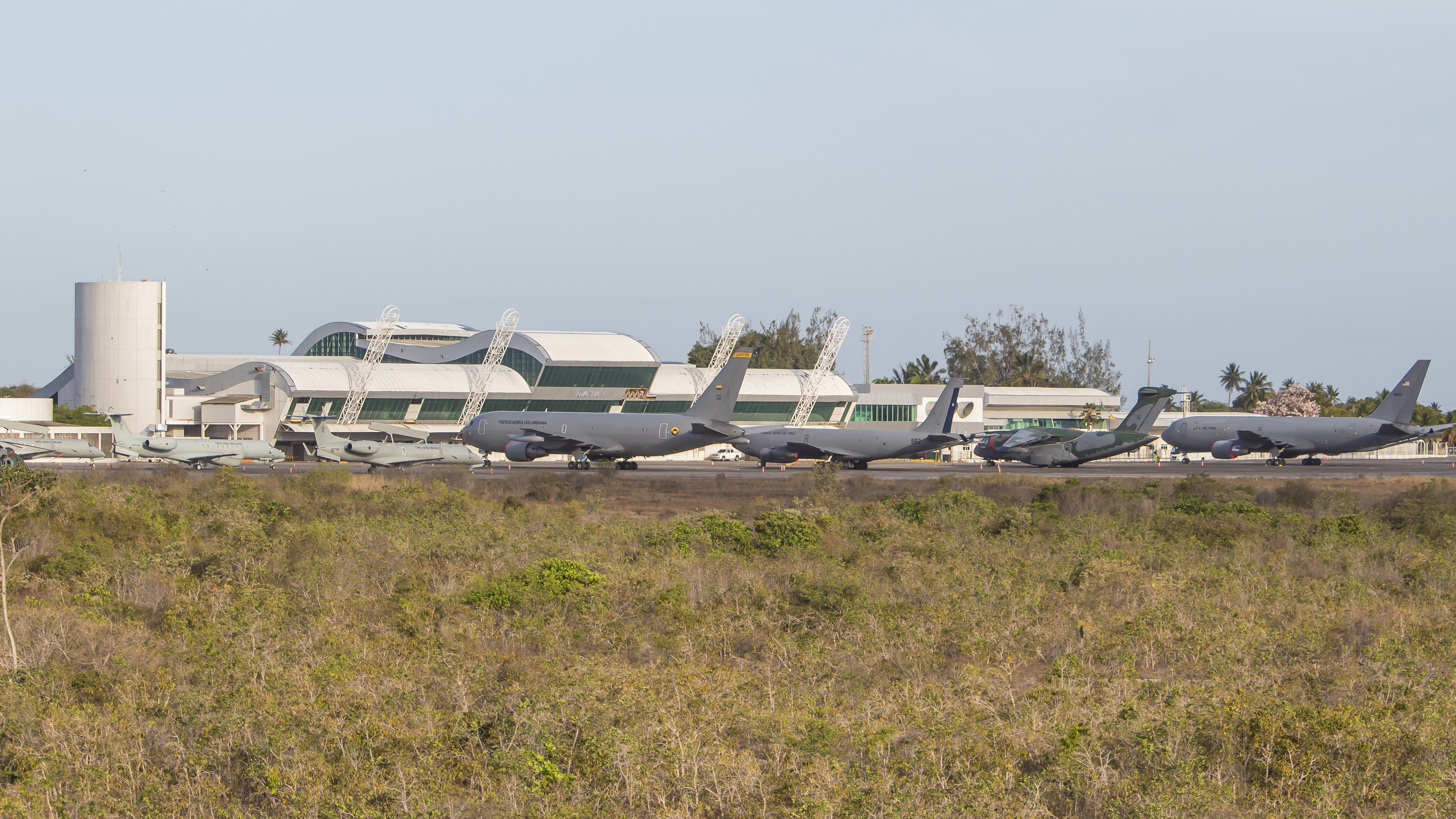
View of Natal Air Force Base during CRUZEX 2024 Boeing 767-2J6ER (MMTT) Fuerza Aerea Colombiana Boeing KC-135E Stratotanker Fuerza Aérea de Chile Embraer KC-390 Força Aérea Brasileira Boeing KC-46A Pegasus (767-2C) United States Air Force

Originally called Parnamirim Airport, this facility had an important role during World War II as a strategic base for aircraft flying between South America and West Africa. Particularly between 1943 and 1945, the base was used jointly by the Brazilian Air Force, United States Army and United States Navy, the Royal Air Force, and commercial airlines. The maintenance and security installations were made by the U.S. Army in the South Atlantic (USAFSA).

It shared some facilities with Augusto Severo International Airport until 31 May 2014.

== Units ==
The following units are based at Natal Air Force Base:

- 1st Squadron of the 5th Aviation Group (1º/5ºGAv) Rumba, using the C-95BM & CM Bandeirante.
- 2nd Squadron of the 5th Aviation Group (2º/5ºGAv) Joker, using the A-29A Super Tucano.
- 1st Squadron of the 8th Aviation Group (1º/8ºGAv) Falcão, using the H-36 Caracal.
- 1st Squadron of the 11th Aviation Group (1º/11ºGav) Gavião, using the H-50 Esquilo.
- 2nd Squadron of Air Transportation (2°ETA) Pastor, using the C-95B & BM Bandeirante, C-97 Brasília, and C-98A Caravan.
- 3rd Squadron of the 1st Communications and Control Group (3º/1ºGCC) Morcego, using radars and equipment for air defense.

== Accidents and incidents ==
- 25 March 1961: Brazilian Air Force, a Douglas C-47 Skytrain registration FAB-2055 flying from Rio de Janeiro to Natal crashed upon final approach. Of the 28 passengers and crew, 5 survived.
- 23 April 1977: Brazilian Air Force, an Embraer C-95 Bandeirante registration FAB-2169 crashed upon landing at Natal.
- 3 July 1977: Brazilian Air Force, an Embraer C-95 Bandeirante registration FAB-2157 crashed after take-off from Natal. All 18 occupants died.

== Access ==
The base is located 18 km from downtown Natal.

== Gallery ==
This gallery displays aircraft that are or have been based at Natal. The gallery is not comprehensive.

=== Present aircraft ===
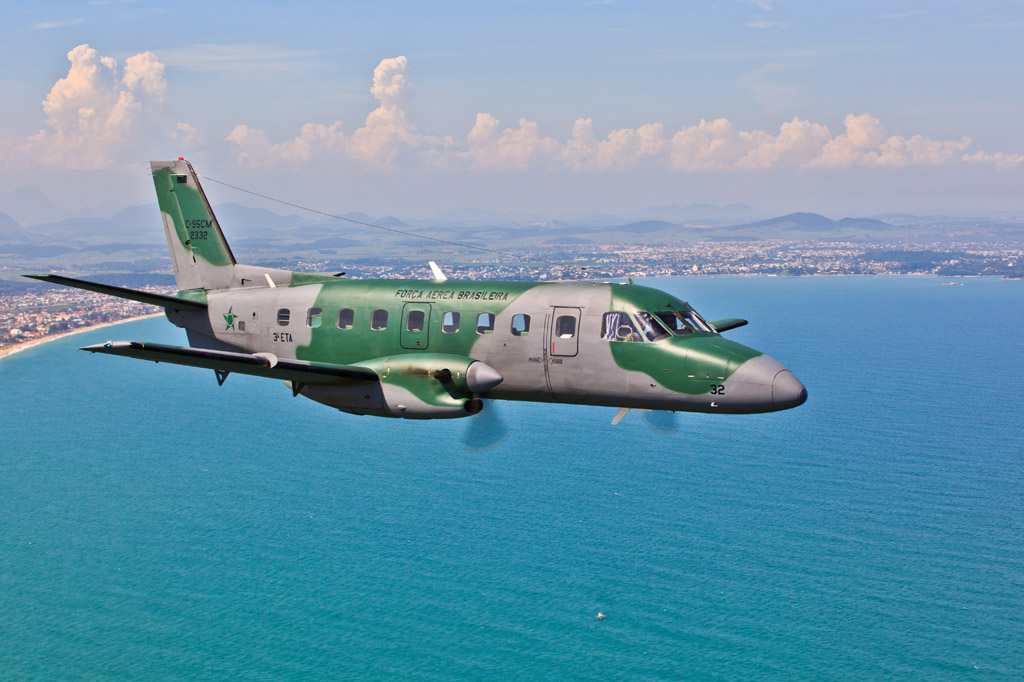
Embraer C-95B Bandeirante (FAB)

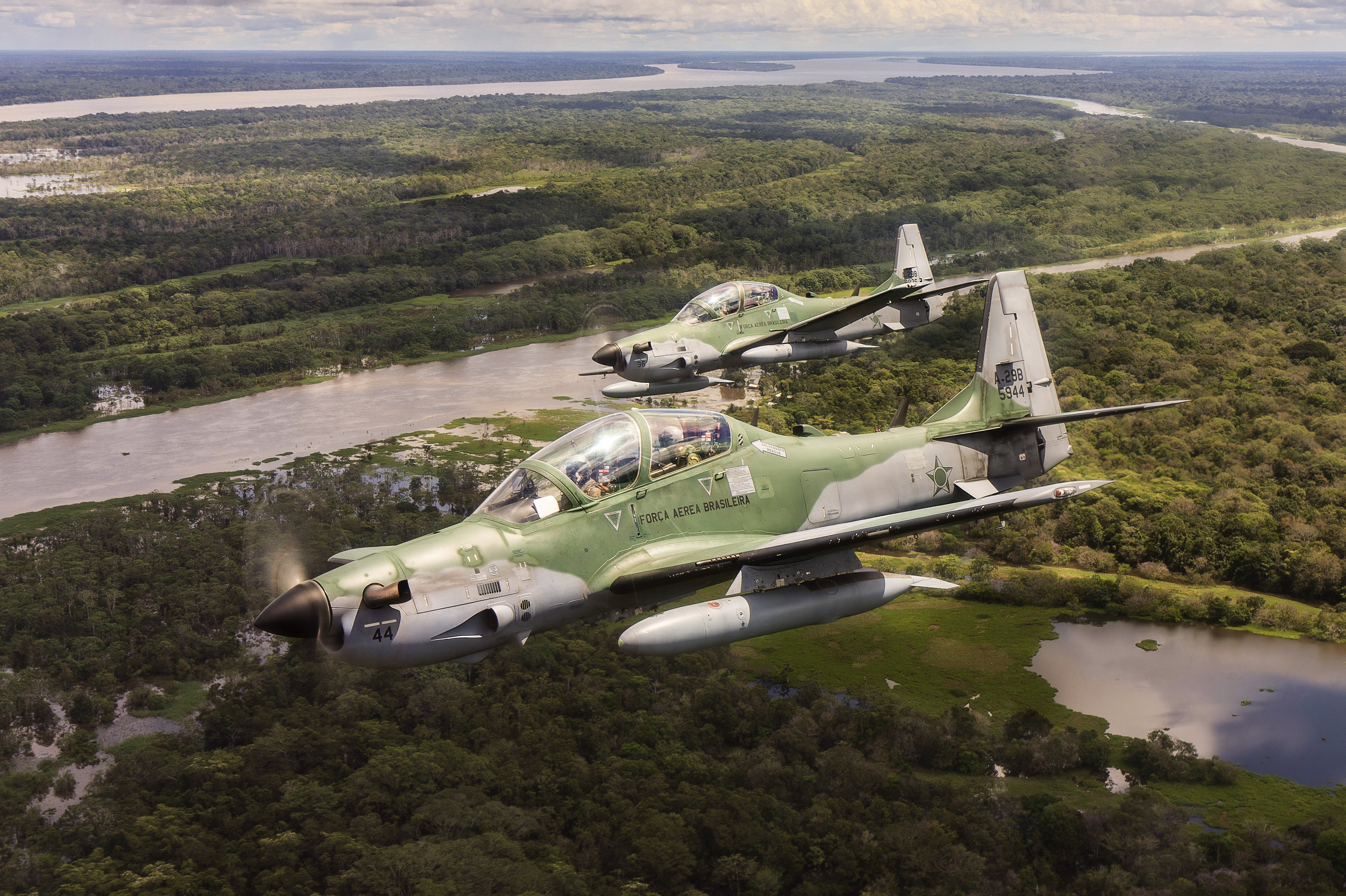
Embraer A-29A Super Tucano (FAB)

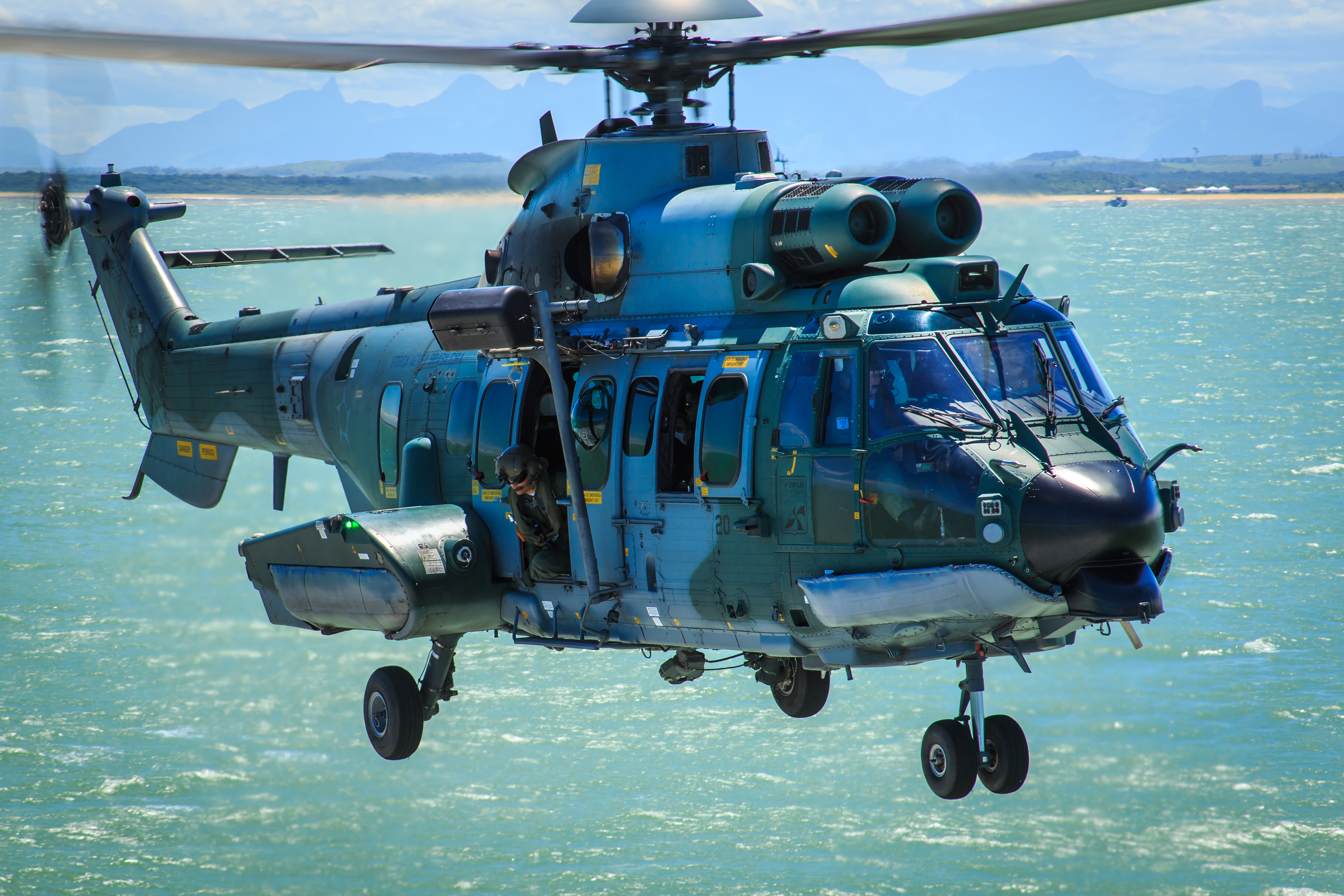
Eurocopter H-36 Caracal (FAB)

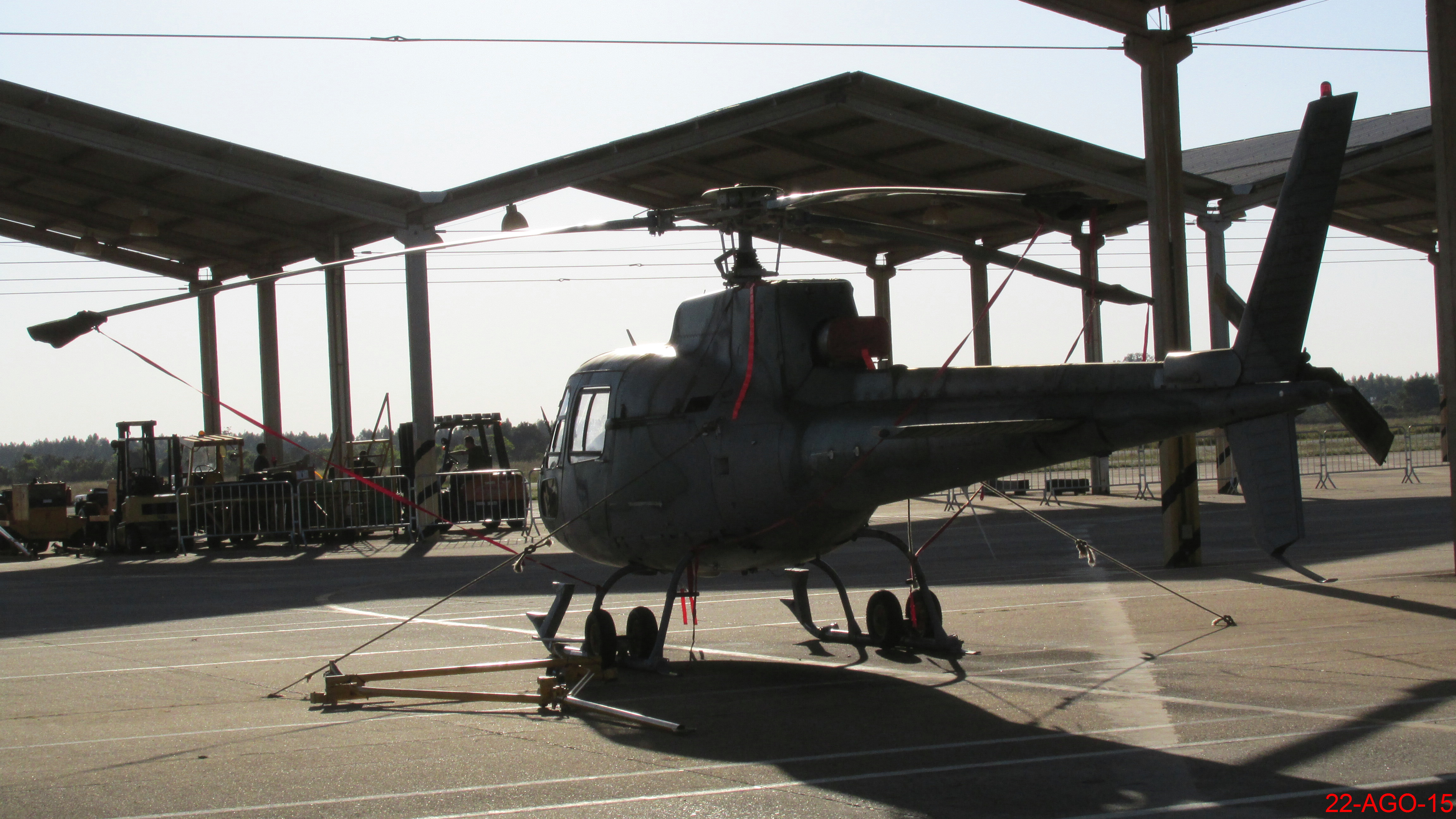
Helibrás H-50 Esquilo (FAB)

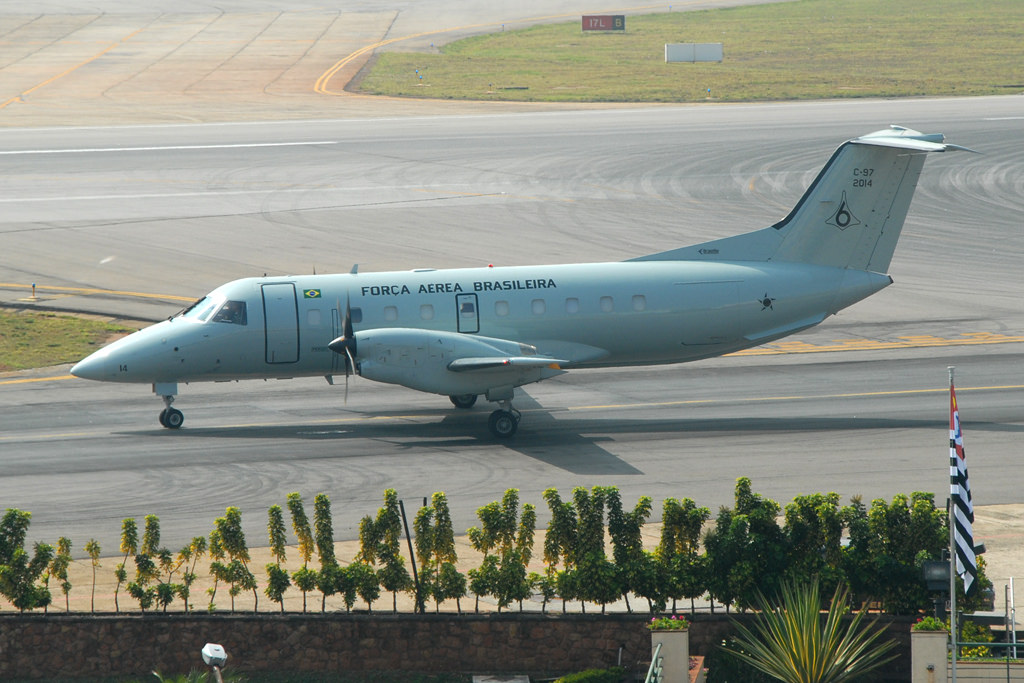
Embraer C-97 Brasília (FAB)

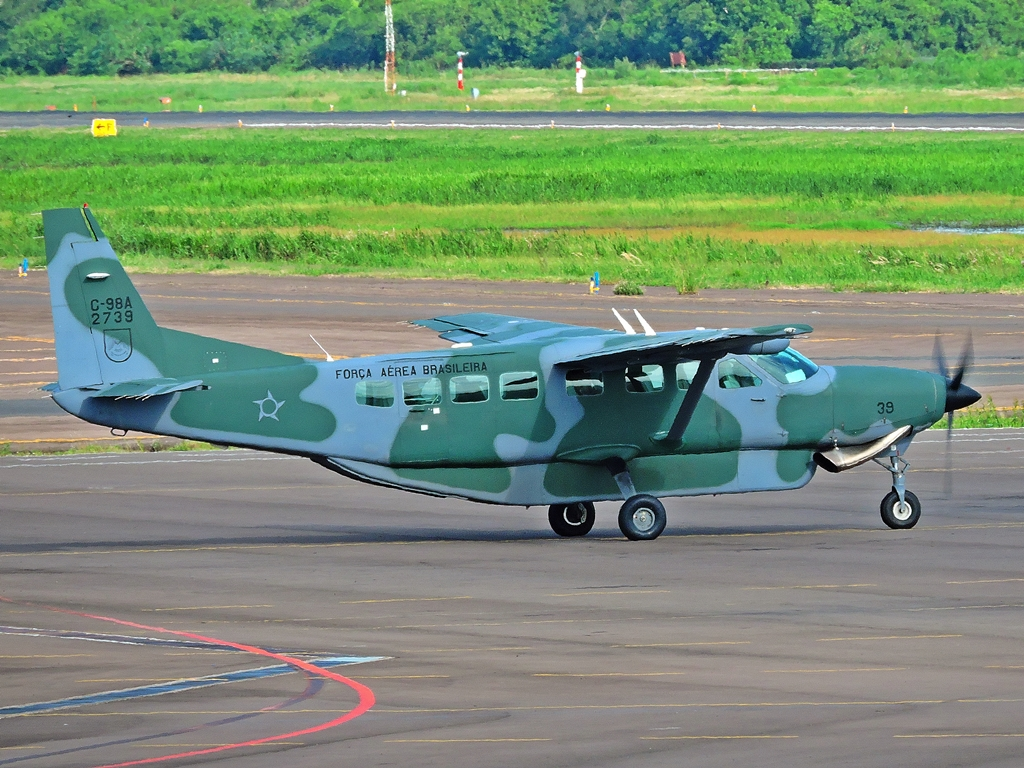
Cessna C-98A Caravan (FAB)

=== Retired aircraft ===
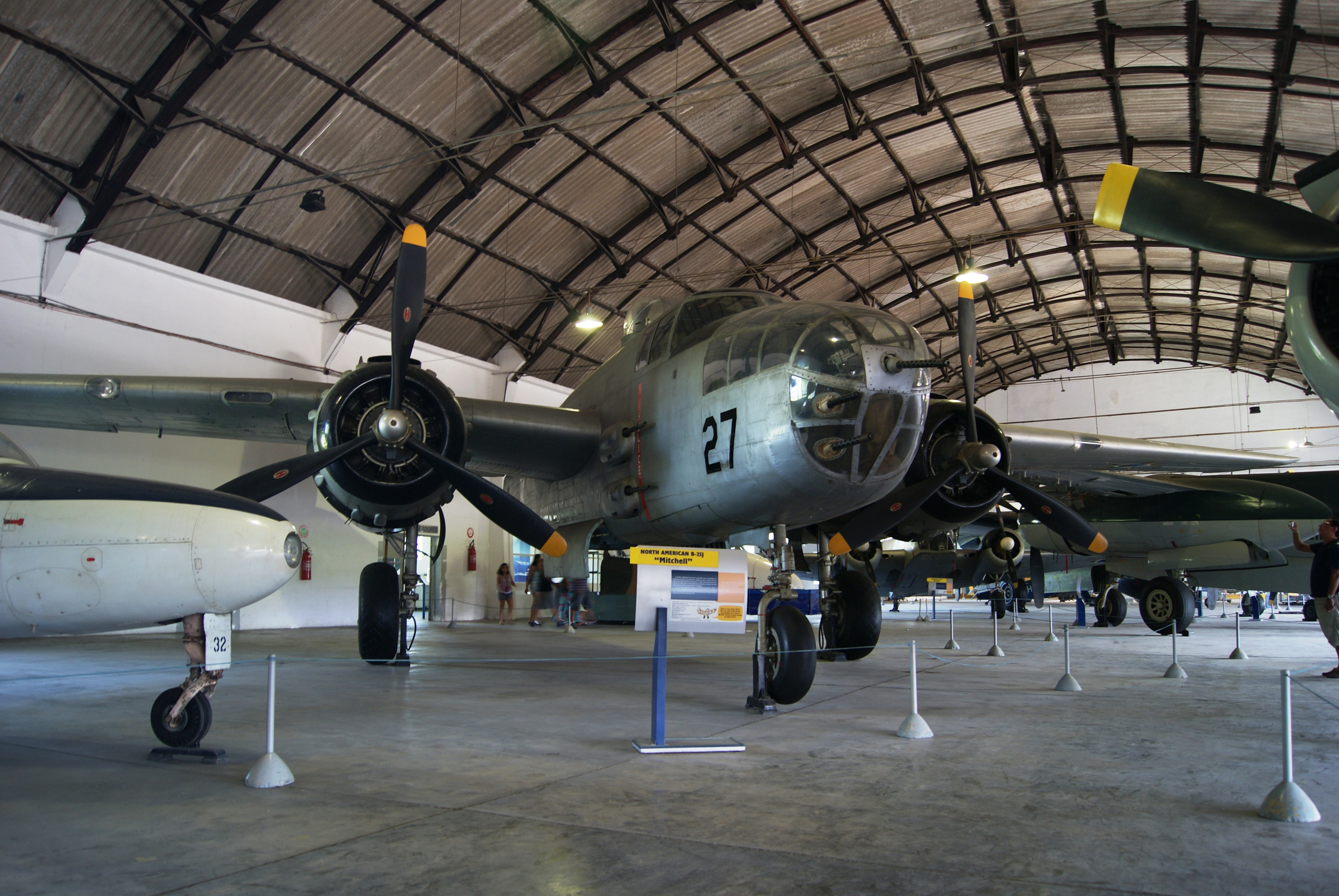
North American B-25J Mitchell

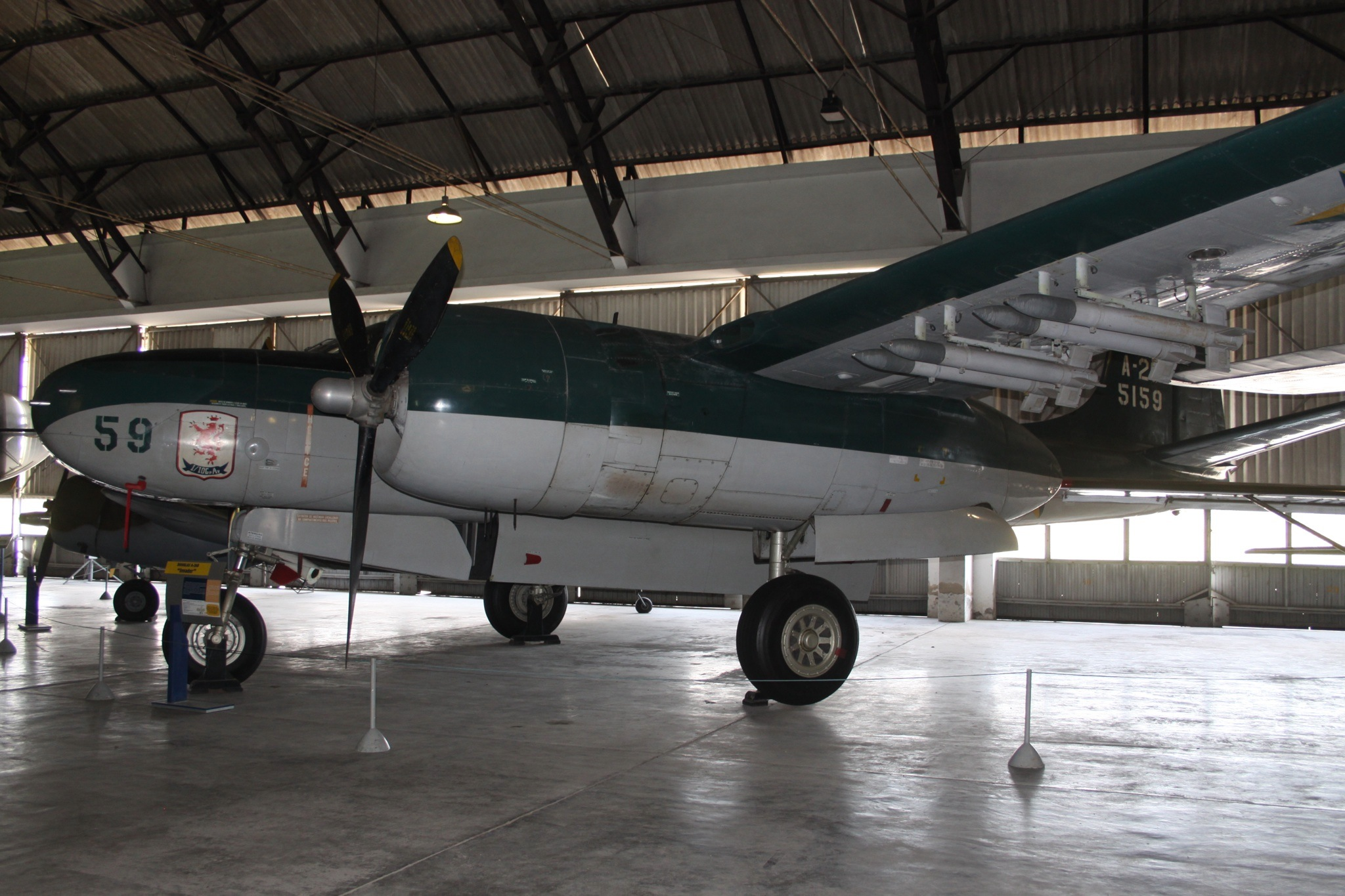
Douglas B-26B Invader

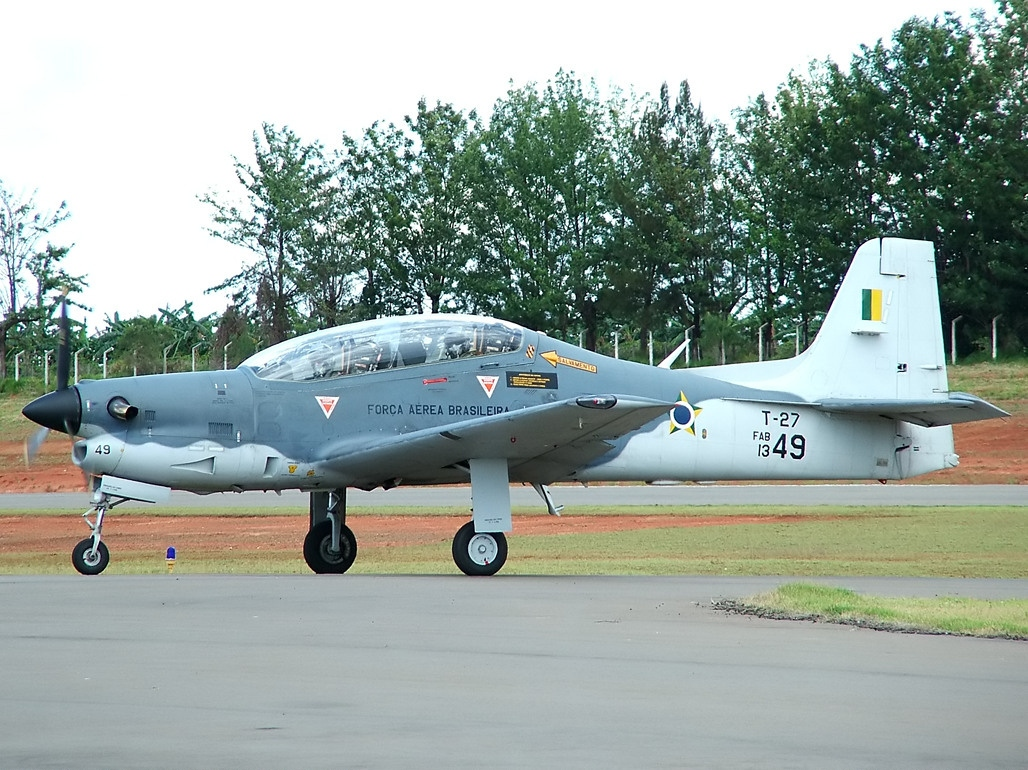
Embraer T-27 Tucano (FAB)

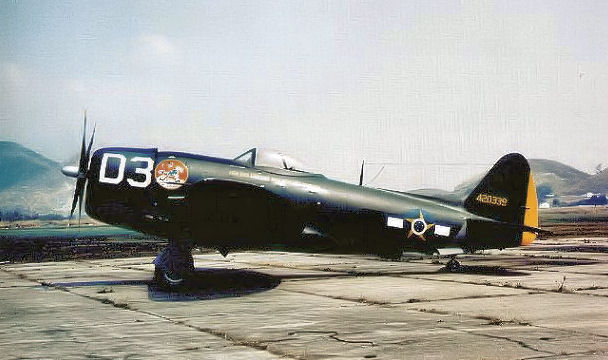
Republic F-47 Thunderbolt

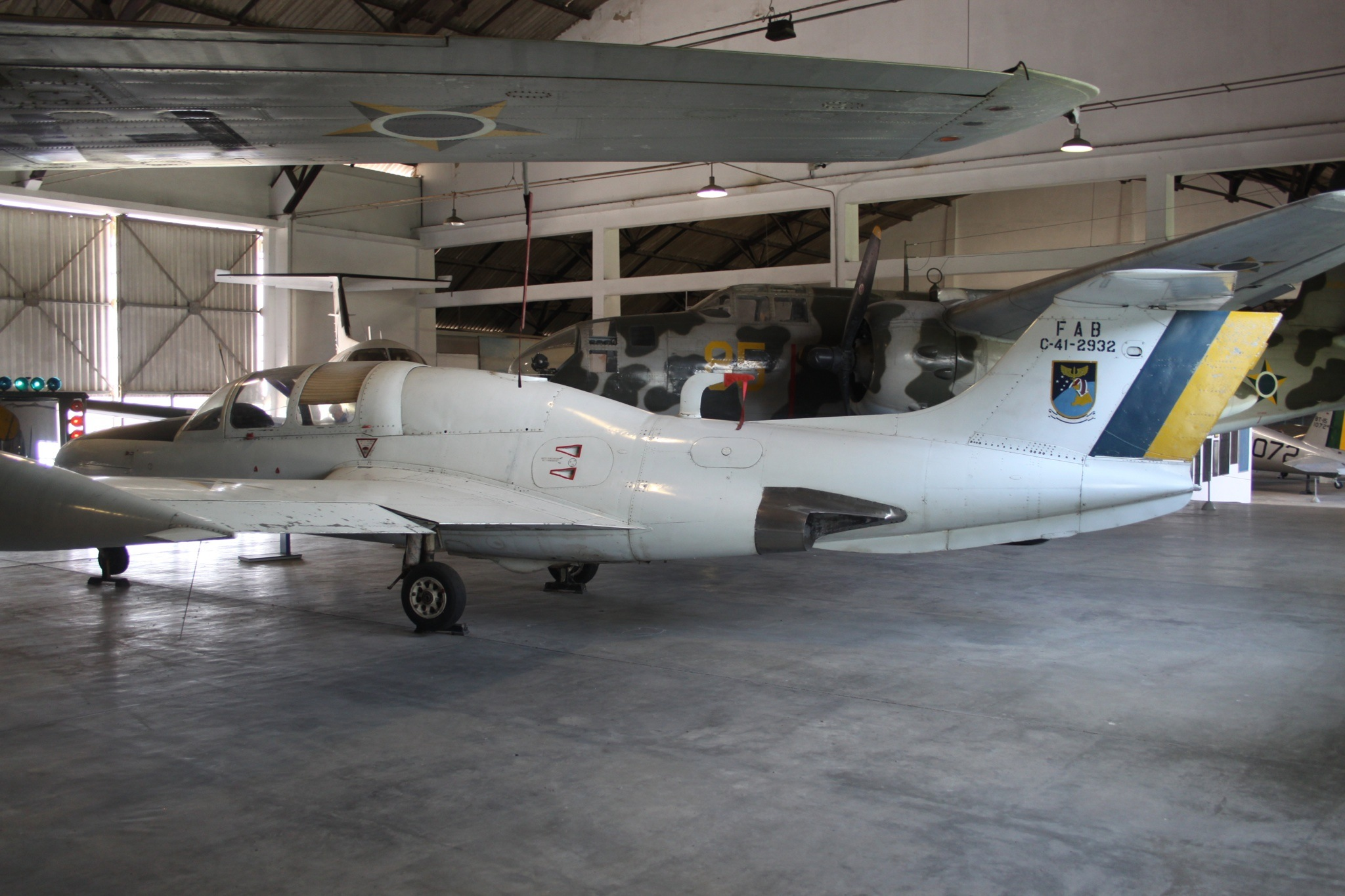
Morane-Saulnier MS-760 Paris

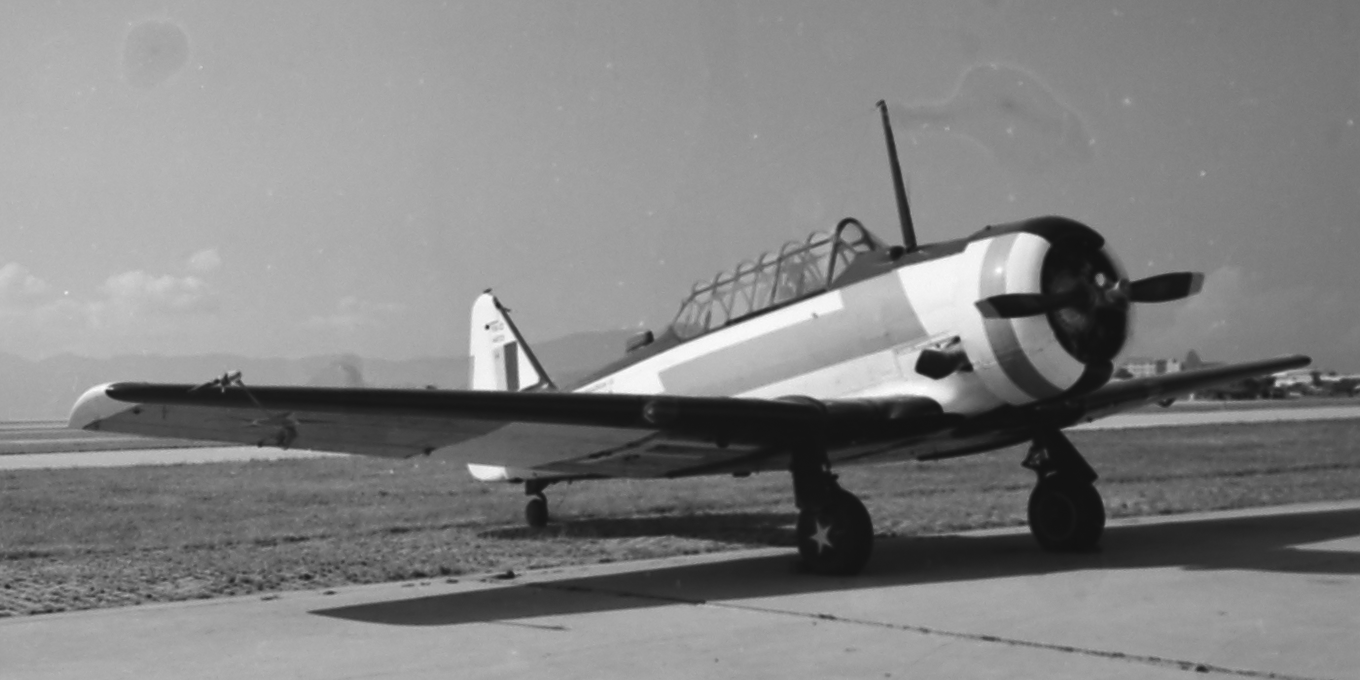
North American T-6G Texan

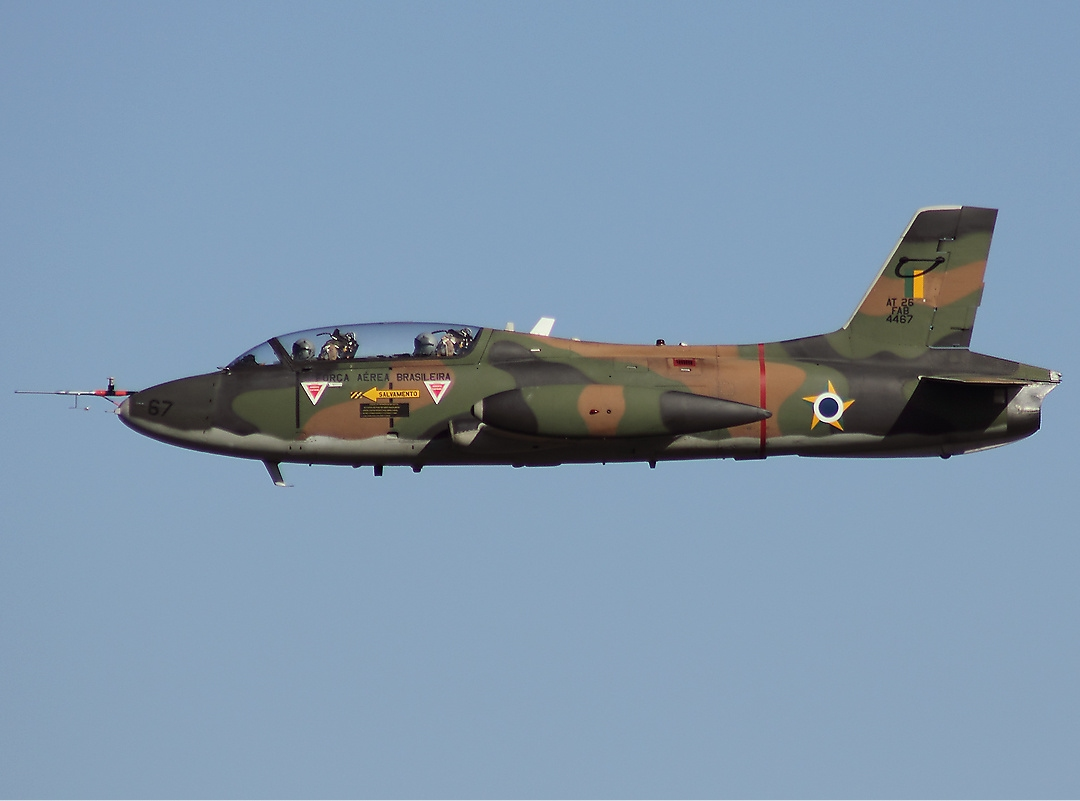
Embraer AT-26 Xavante (FAB)

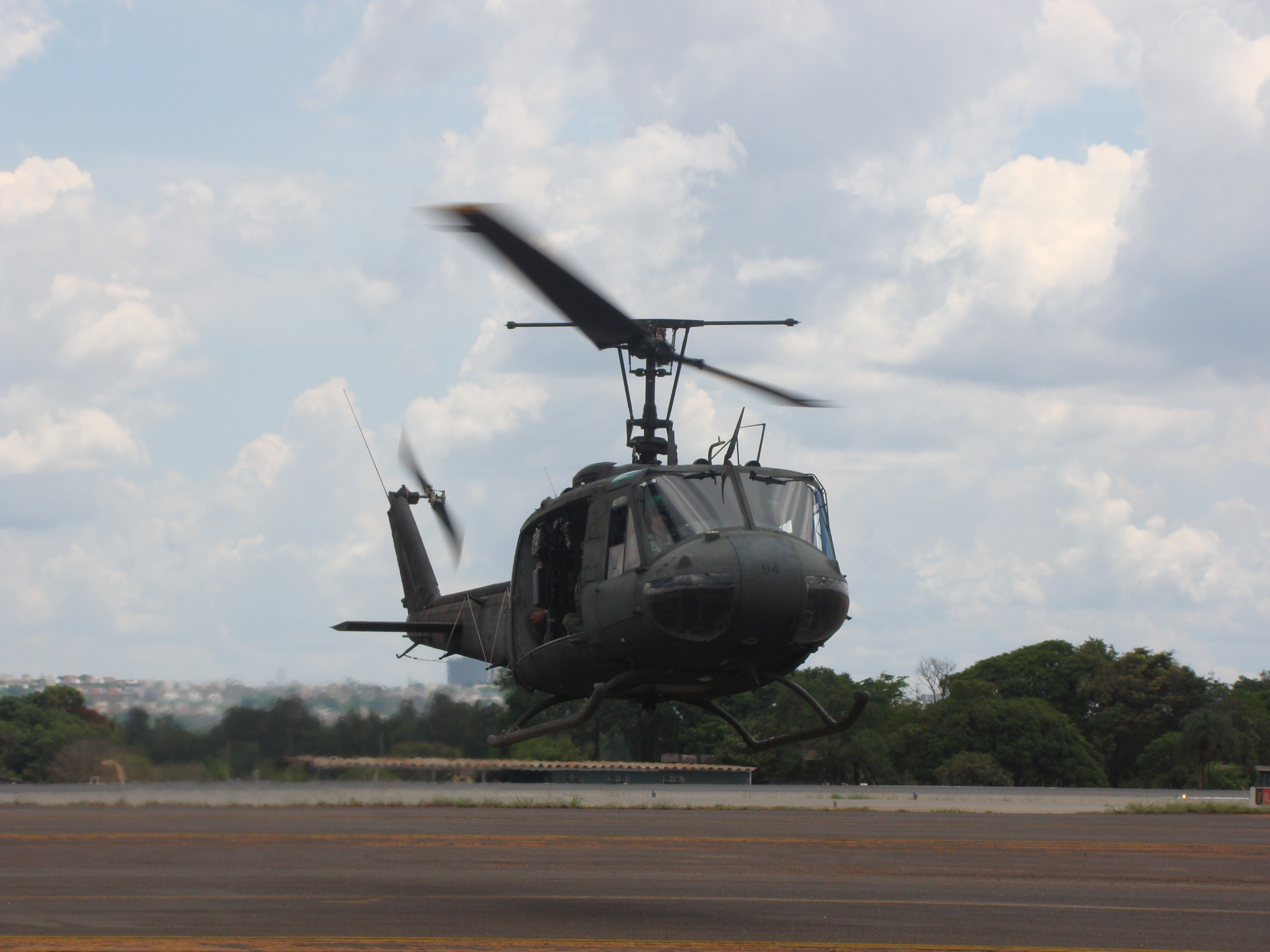
Bell H-1H Iroquois

== See also ==
- List of Brazilian military bases
- Augusto Severo International Airport
