= CRUZEX =

Brazilian-led multinational aerial exercises

The CRUZEX is a series of multinational and operational exercises coordinated by the Brazilian Air Force since 2002, traditionally at the Natal Air Force Base in the Rio Grande do Norte state. The CRUZEX is the most important aerial exercises in Latin America as the largest multinational war training in the region.

== List of exercises ==
Participant countries and respective aerial assets.

Cruzex I
May 2002 — Canoas AFB
(Brazil) Mirage III, F-5 Tiger II, AMX, EMB 312 Tucano, Boeing 707, C-130 Hercules, EMB 110 Bandeirante, Super Puma, Bell UH-1, AS350 Écureuil

(France) Mirage 2000, KC-135 Stratotanker, E-3 Sentry

(Argentina) A-4AR Fighting Hawk, C-130 Hercules

(Chile) (as observers)

Cruzex II
November 2004 — Natal AFB
(Brazil) Mirage III, F-5 Tiger II, AMX, EMB 312 Tucano, Boeing 707, C-130 Hercules, C295, EMB 110 Bandeirante, Super Puma, Bell UH-1, AS350 Écureuil

(France) Mirage 2000, KC-135 Stratotanker, E-3 Sentry

(Venezuela) F-16 Fighting Falcon, Mirage 50, Boeing 707, Super Puma

(Argentina) A-4AR Fighting Hawk, IA 58 Pucará, C-130 Hercules

(Peru) — (South Africa) — (Uruguay) (as observers)

Cruzex III
August—September 2006 — Anápolis AFB
(Brazil) Mirage III, F-5 Tiger II, AMX, EMB 314 Super Tucano, EMB 312 Tucano, Boeing 707, C-130 Hercules, C295, EMB 110 Bandeirante, Super Puma, Bell UH-1, AS350 Écureuil

(France) Mirage 2000, E-3 Sentry

(Venezuela) F-16 Fighting Falcon, Mirage 50, F-5 Tiger II, Boeing 707

(Argentina) A-4AR Fighting Hawk, IA 58 Pucará

(Uruguay) A-37 Dragonfly, IA 58 Pucará

(Bolivia) — (Colombia) — (Paraguay) (as observers)

Cruzex IV
November 2008 — Natal AFB
(Brazil) Mirage 2000, F-5 Tiger II, AMX, EMB 314 Super Tucano, Boeing 707, C-130 Hercules, C295, EMB 110 Bandeirante, Super Puma, AS350 Écureuil

(France) Mirage 2000

(Chile) F-5 Tiger II, Boeing 707

(Venezuela) F-16 Fighting Falcon

(Uruguay) A-37 Dragonfly, IA 58 Pucará

(Bolivia) — (Canada) — (Colombia) — (Ecuador) — (United Kingdom) — (Paraguay) — (Peru) (as observers)

Cruzex V
October—November 2010 — Natal AFB
(Brazil) Mirage 2000, F-5 Tiger II, AMX, EMB 314 Super Tucano, C-130 Hercules, C295, EMB 110 Bandeirante, Super Puma, Bell UH-1, AS350 Écureuil

(France) Rafale, Mirage 2000

(United States) F-16 Fighting Falcon, KC-135 Stratotanker

(Chile) F-16 Fighting Falcon, KC-135 Stratotanker

(Argentina) A-4AR Fighting Hawk, C-130 Hercules

(Uruguay) A-37 Dragonfly, IA 58 Pucará

(Bolivia) — (Canada) — (Colombia) — (Ecuador) — (United Kingdom) — (Paraguay) — (Peru) (as observers)

Cruzex VI
October—November 2013 — Natal AFB
(Brazil) Mirage 2000, F-5 Tiger II, AMX, EMB 314 Super Tucano, C-130 Hercules, C295. UH-60 Black Hawk, Mil Mi-24, H225M, Embraer E-99

(United States) F-16 Fighting Falcon, KC-135 Stratotanker

(Chile) F-16 Fighting Falcon, KC-135 Stratotanker

(Venezuela) F-16 Fighting Falcon, Shaanxi Y-8

(Colombia) A-37 Dragonfly, KC-767, C-130 Hercules

(Uruguay) A-37 Dragonfly, IA 58 Pucará, C-130 Hercules

(Ecuador) EMB 314 Super Tucano

(Canada) C-130J Super Hercules

Cruzex VII
November 2018 — Natal AFB
(Brazil) F-5 Tiger II, AMX, EMB 314 Super Tucano, Boeing 767, C-130 Hercules, C295. UH-60 Black Hawk, H225M, Embraer E-99

(United States) F-16 Fighting Falcon, KC-135 Stratotanker

(Chile) F-16 Fighting Falcon, KC-135 Stratotanker

(Peru) Mirage 2000, Boeing 737-200, C-130 Hercules, C-27J Spartan

(Uruguay) A-37 Dragonfly

(Canada) C-130J Super Hercules

(France) C295

Cruzex VIII
November 2024 — Natal AFB
(Brazil) JAS 39 Gripen, F-5 Tiger II, AMX, A-4 Skyhawk (Navy), EMB 314 Super Tucano, C-390 Millenium, C295, H225M, Embraer E-99

(United States) F-15 Strike Eagle, KC-46 Pegasus

(Chile) F-16 Fighting Falcon, KC-135 Stratotanker

(Argentina) IA 63 Pampa, C-130 Hercules

(Peru) KT-1, C-130 Hercules

(Paraguay) EMB 312 Tucano, C-212

(Colombia) KC-767

(Portugal) C-390 Millenium

(Canada) — (France) — (Ecuador) — (Germany) — (Italy) — (South Africa) — (Sweden) — (Uruguay) (as observers)
