= Colorado Department of Military and Veterans Affairs =

American government agency

Department of Military and Veterans Affairs
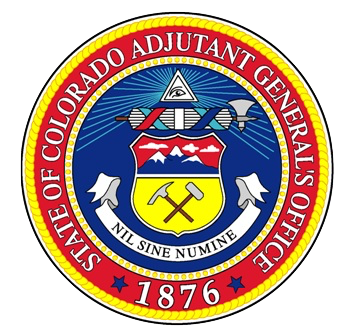
- Seal of the Colorado Adjutant General's Office

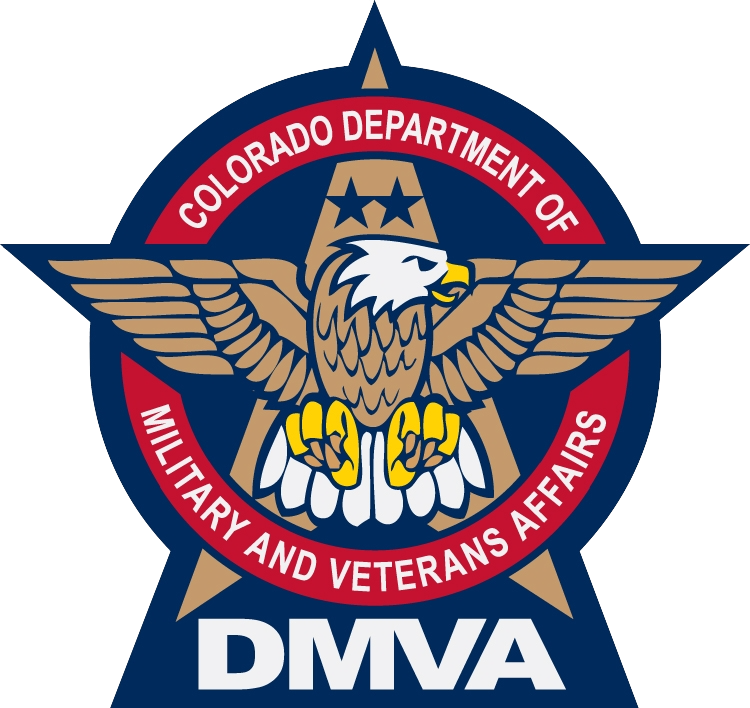
- Logo of the Colorado Department of Military and Veterans Affairs

Agency overview
- Jurisdiction: Colorado
- Headquarters: 6848 South Revere Parkway Centennial, Colorado 80112; 39.591573°N 104.84137079999999°W
- Annual budget: $226,968,060 (2017-18)
- Agency executive: Brigadier General Laura L. Clellan Adjutant General of Colorado Michael (Myk) Bruno Deputy Executive Director
- Website: www.colorado.gov/dmva

The Colorado Department of Military and Veterans Affairs is the principal department of the Colorado state government that supervises both the Colorado National Guard (including the Colorado Army National Guard and Colorado Air National Guard), and non-military state safety agencies.

The Department consists of the Department of Military Affairs, and the Division of Veterans' Affairs, and is headed by the Adjutant General of Colorado.

== Colorado National Guard ==
The United States Code, Titles 10 and 32, specifically charge the National Guard with dual federal and state missions. Those functions range from limited actions during non-emergency situations to full scale law enforcement of martial law when local law enforcement officials can no longer maintain civil control.

The National Guard may be called into federal service in response to a call by the President or Congress. When National Guard troops are called to federal service, the President serves as Commander-In-Chief. The federal mission assigned to the National Guard is: "To provide properly trained and equipped units for prompt mobilization for war, National emergency or as otherwise needed."

The Governor may call individuals or units of the Colorado National Guard into state service during emergencies or to assist in special situations which lend themselves to use of the National Guard. The state mission assigned to the National Guard is: "To provide trained and disciplined forces for domestic emergencies or as otherwise provided by state law."

== Colorado State Defense Force ==
The Colorado State Defense Force is the currently-inactive state defense force of Colorado. When active, it is responsible for augmenting the Colorado National Guard in their stateside duties.

== Colorado Wing Civil Air Patrol ==
The Colorado Wing of the Civil Air Patrol falls under a federal command structure. However, state-funded missions of the Colorado Wing are coordinated through the Colorado Department of Military and Veterans Affairs.

== Division of Veterans Affairs ==
The Division of Veterans Affairs is responsible for assisting Colorado veterans for obtaining the state and federal benefits they are qualified for.

== See also ==
- Sand Creek massacre
- Ludlow Massacre
- Colorado Labor Wars
