= Colorado National Guard Armory =

- Armory
- U.S. National Register of Historic Places
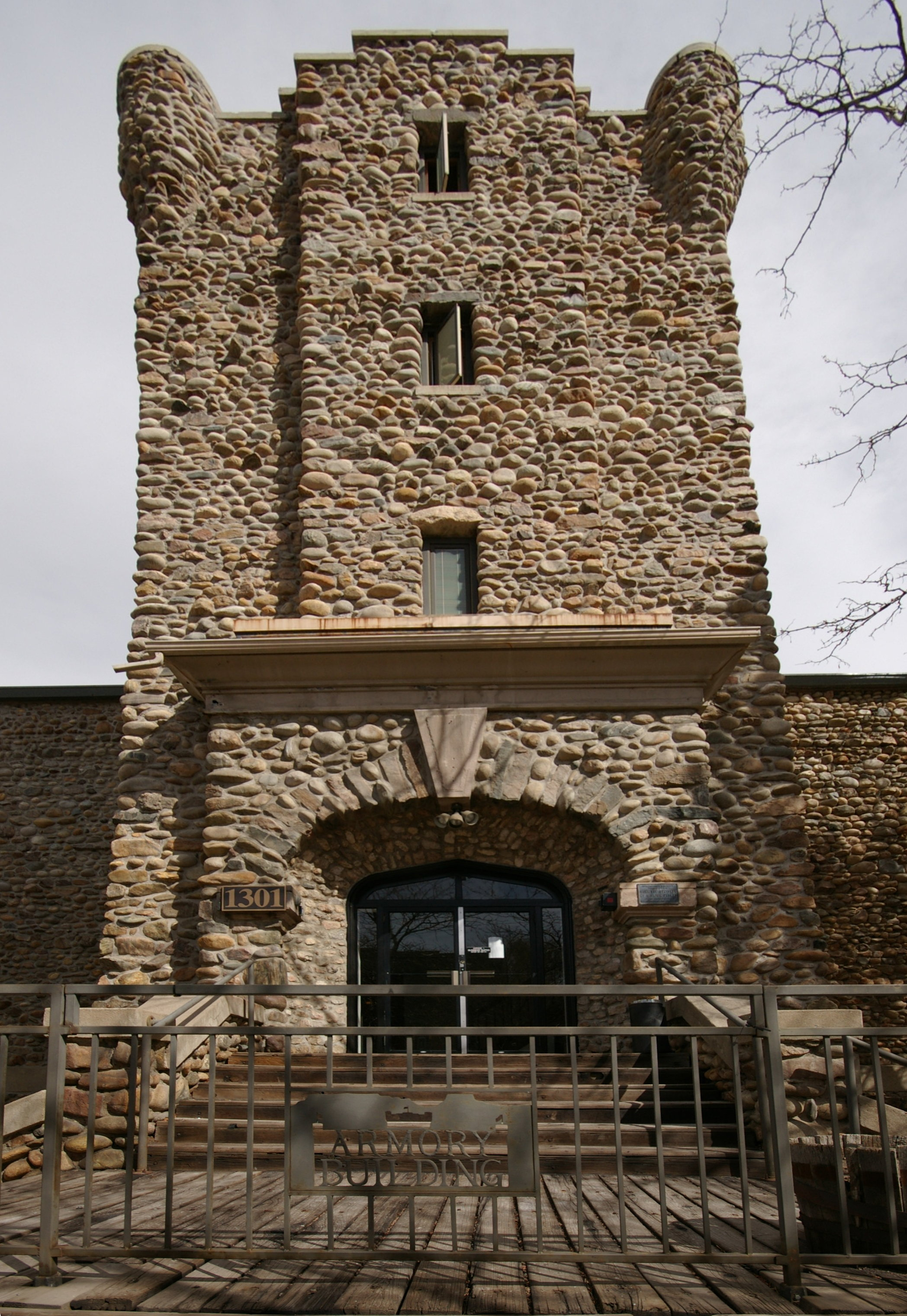
- Location: Golden, Colorado
- Coordinates: 39°45′14″N 105°13′16″W
- Built: 1913
- Architect: James H. Gow
- Architectural style: Castle
- NRHP reference No.: 78000860
- Added to NRHP: December 18, 1978

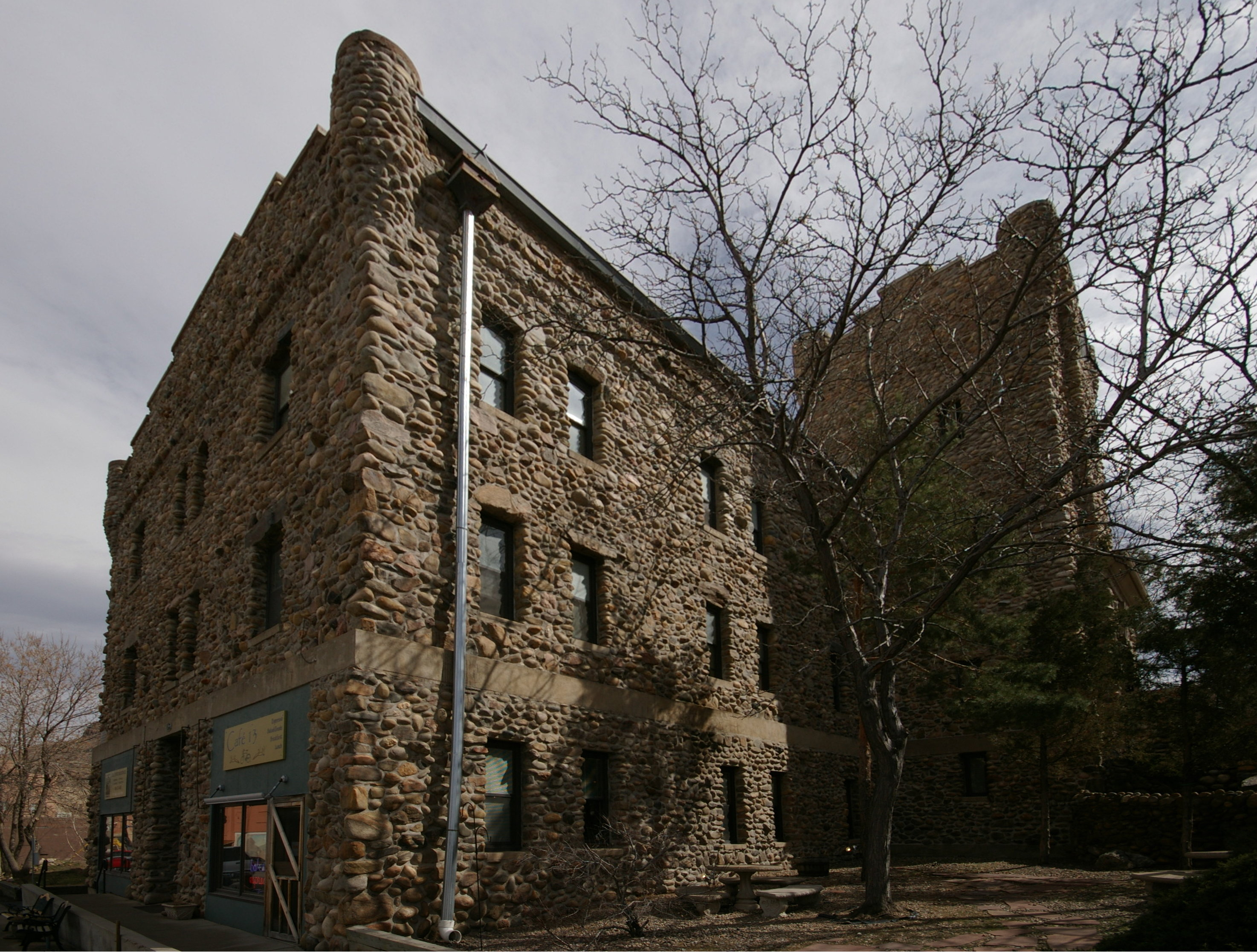
Another view of the armory building

The Colorado National Guard Armory, known commonly by locals simply as the Armory, is a landmark in Golden, Colorado. Unusual in its construction, it was at one time the largest cobblestone building in the United States. It was built in 1913 by the Colorado National Guard as an armory, quarters, mess hall and auditorium for the Guard's Company A of Engineers. When it was completed in 1914, the Company was housed in this building's second and third floors while the first-story garden level was available for rental to the public. The Armory's original uses included: Golden's Post Office (northeast first-level storefront); photo shop (northwest first-level storefront); barracks, mess hall, weapons storage and drill hall (second level); auditorium (third level, known as Armory Hall); and map room (tower). Its engineering company served with distinction and under fire in France in World War I and remained in service here. In subsequent years the building served in part or whole as a hotel, offices, industrial bank, and student housing. During the influenza epidemic of 1918 the building became an emergency hospital for ill patients used by the Red Cross, and in 1933 it became the local headquarters of the Civil Works Administration, the federal depression era agency which created several area improvements. Armory Hall was open to the public and served the community for social gatherings, fundraisers, sports (one of the oldest basketball keys in the world, painted in 1914 just 23 years after the sport was invented, is still painted on the floor), and was the early home of Golden's American Legion post. Calvary Episcopal Church is the current property owner.

Today the Armory houses Cafe 13, a local coffeeshop, on the first floor. The second floor is Colorado School of Mines student housing which is administered by the church. The remaining first floor, third floor, and fourth floor tower are home to Connects Workspace, Golden's only coworking space.

== Cobblestone Castle ==
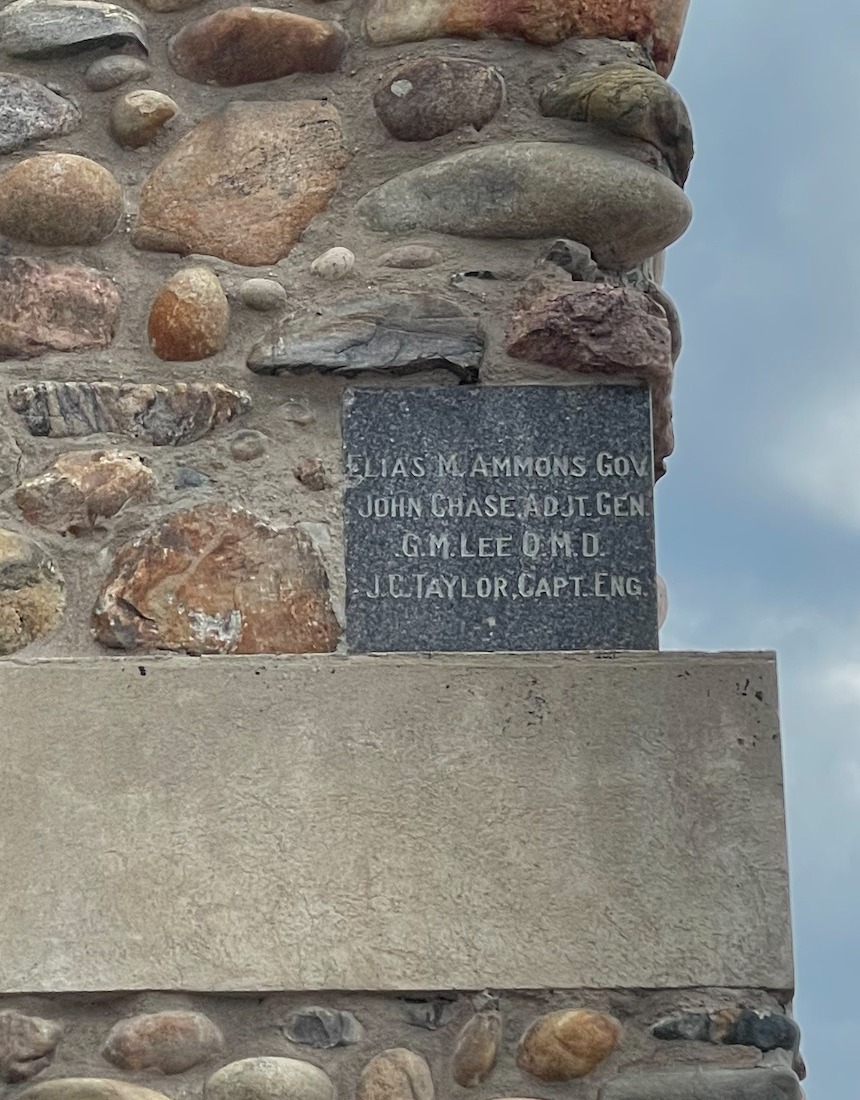
Stone bearing the names of those involved in the construction of the Colorado National Guard Armory in Golden, Colorado.

The cornerstone for the building was laid 14 June 1913. Built in 1913 and 1914, partially during the height of the Colorado Coalfield War, a strategic building for “observation” was desired. The Armory was designed by James H. Gow, originally in a design that was meant to be made of brick, and then of granite. Cost-cutting measures led the Guard to switch the building to a free and plentiful local resource, cobblestone, leading to the building’s distinctive and famous appearance. Some 3,300 wagonloads weighing 6,600 tons were hauled by Lawrence W. Billis from Clear Creek to this site, and as it rose some locals and experts predicted it would collapse. Although its cornerstone, at the northeast base corner of the second level, appears out of plumb, this is an optical illusion created by the cobblestone construction.

The building was designed as a castle due to the castle emblem of Company A of Engineers to be housed here, long the historical emblem of U.S. Army engineers. Reputedly the building may also have been inspired by Golden resident Col. Joseph C. Taylor's fondness for the Royal Military Academy buildings at Sandhurst, England. Taylor's name–along with that of then-Governor Elias Ammons, Adjutant General John Chase, and G.M. Lee–appear engraved on a stone along the building's eastern face.

It was listed in Ripley's Believe It Or Not as the largest cobblestone building in the United States. Actor Gene Hackman is one of its previous owners, according to Jefferson County property records and eyewitness accounts. The historic post office walk-in safe can be visited by the public in its lower level. Its lowest walls are several feet thick, owing to the massive load above them. The Armory was the first of many area buildings of its time constructed primarily in rustic cobblestone, fieldstone and other native stone, inspiring a unique local architectural movement that continued into the 1940s including Camp George West Historic District.

== See also ==
- National Register of Historic Places listings in Jefferson County, Colorado
