= Woodstock West =

1970 protest site at the University of Denver

Coordinates: 39°40′38″N 104°57′43″W

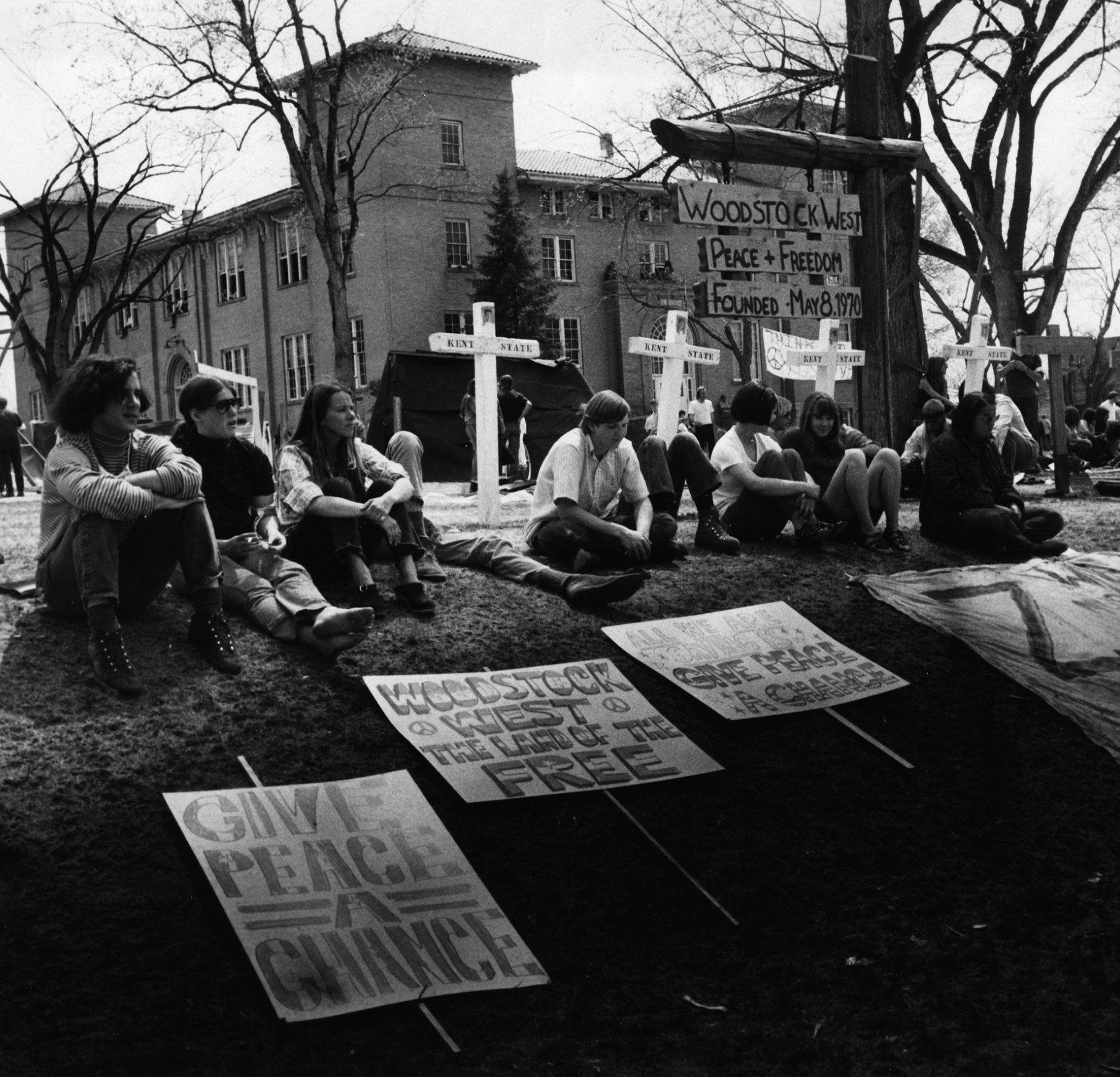
Flanked by four crosses bearing the names of students killed by National Guardsmen at Kent State University, University of Denver students protest their own school's decision to stay open.

Woodstock West is the name University of Denver students gave to the shanty village that they built while protesting the school's decision to stay open after the Kent State shootings.

== History ==
On May 4, 1970, 1,500 students gathered on the University of Denver campus to publicly mourn their fallen comrades at Kent State and attempted to make sense of President Nixon’s invasion of Cambodia, a clear sign of extending rather than ending the contentious Vietnam War. Shouts of “Burn! Burn! Burn!” tumbled through the student body like a Rocky Mountain spring avalanche. Somehow, a lone voice broke through, “Let’s build, not burn.” Thus was born the idea for Woodstock West, an intentionally peaceful response to the violence engulfing campuses from New York to Seattle.

Students pitched tents and built makeshift shelters on a grassy area known as the Carnegie Green. There they debated, performed, sang, talked and tried to make sense of their sorrow and anger. The spirit of those first few days replicated the peace and freedom of its namesake, the 1969 music extravaganza Woodstock.

The encampment was eventually razed on May 13, after the university called in the Colorado National Guard.

== Background ==
Two critical events that helped to set the stage for Woodstock West were President Nixon's position on the Vietnam War, and the shooting of student protesters at Kent State.

Nixon had campaigned in 1968 that he would end U.S. involvement in the Vietnam War. Among other platform statements that detailed an end to the war, the Republicans wrote in 1968, “We must urgently dedicate our efforts toward restoration of peace both at home and abroad.” His narrow victory over Democrat Hubert Humphrey and Independent George Wallace illustrated, in part, the voters’ support of this platform imperative. On April 30, 1970, however, the president came clean about a 14-month bombing campaign in Cambodia. This signaled to many he had broken his campaign promise and had, instead, escalated the war he promised to end.

This set off the second critical event that provided impetus for Woodstock West. In response to Nixon's announcement, campuses erupted into protests, strikes, and violence. Perhaps the most well-known incident of this time happened at Kent State University in Kent, Ohio. The governor called the National Guard into Kent after various violent incidents occurred in town and on campus. A Monday morning anti-war rally ended with Guardsmen killing four students, wounding nine others and leaving a nation in shock.
