= Colorado State Defense Force =

- Active: 1917–1918; 1941–1945
- Country: United States
- Allegiance: Colorado
- Branch: Army
- Type: State defense force
- Role: Military reserve force

The Colorado State Defense Force, formerly known as the Colorado State Service, is the current, albeit inactive state defense force of Colorado. The Colorado State Defense Force served as the stateside replacement for the Colorado National Guard while the National Guard was in federal service during World War I and World War II.

== History ==
=== World War I ===
In the summer of 1917, the Colorado Reserve Service was organized as a unit consisting of five companies: companies A, B, and C of the Third Regiment; and A and B of Colored Infantry. They were called into active service for guard duty on public utilities and reservoir projects on 1 August 1917. The largest total of men on active duty was 409 in September 1917; the smallest was 168 in October 1918. After the war, late in 1918, the 3rd Colorado Infantry and Troop "A" of the Colorado Cavalry received federal recognition as National Guard units.

=== World War II ===
In June 1941, the defense force, consisting of 200 men, was officially named the "Colorado state defense force of the state of Colorado." By 30 June 1944, the Colorado State Defense Force had reached a strength of 641 soldiers.

== Legal status ==
Each state has the legal authority to maintain its own state defense force, as recognized by the federal government of the United States under Title 32, Section 109 of the United States Code. Under Colorado law, the Governor of Colorado may reactivate the Colorado State Defense Force, making reactivation possible through executive order or an act of legislation.

== See also ==
- Colorado Wing Civil Air Patrol
