= Colorado Wing Civil Air Patrol =

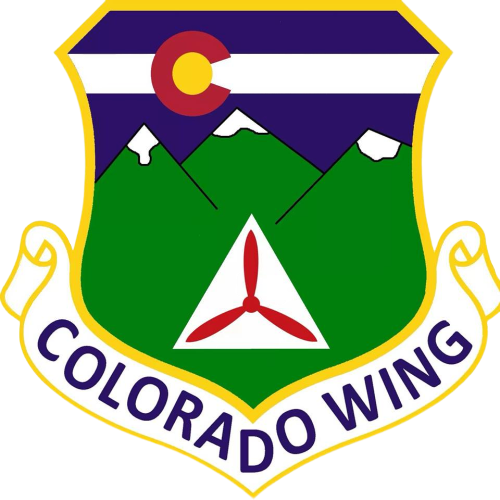
- Colorado Wing of Civil Air Patrol

Associated branches
- United States Air Force

Command staff
- Commander: Col Evan Jones
- Deputy Commander: Lt Col Kevin Gillooly
- Chief of Staff: Maj Robert Hogue
- Senior Enlisted Leader: SMSgt Richard Lopez

Current statistics
- Cadets: 1,347
- Seniors: 887
- Total Membership: 2,234
- Website: cowg.cap.gov
- Statistics as of October 2026

Colorado Wing Civil Air Patrol (CAP) is the highest echelon of CAP in the state of Colorado. Its headquarters are located at Peterson Space Force Base, and the wing is under the command of Col Evan Jones.

Colorado Wing (COWG) operates in the Rocky Mountain Region for CAP. COWG consists of 26 squadrons in four groups within Colorado. CAP squadrons are of three types: Cadet, Composite and Senior: 1) "Cadet" squadrons consists of basic cadets, with a minimum of three senior members (adults) for supervisory, administrative, and training requirements; 2) "Senior" squadrons consists exclusively of senior members, all over the age of 18; and, 3) "Composite" squadrons consists of both cadets and senior members, conducting both cadet and senior programs.

== Structure ==
Colorado Wing is the highest echelon of Civil Air Patrol in Colorado, and reports to Rocky Mountain Region CAP, who reports to CAP National Headquarters. The wing supervises the individual groups and squadrons that comprise the basic operational unit of CAP. The Colorado Wing headquarters is located at Peterson Space Force Base in Colorado Springs.

Below the Wing level, Colorado is divided into smaller groups. Each group conducts its own training and programs,

Underneath each group are numerous squadrons. Squadrons are the local level of organization, and squadrons meet weekly to conduct training. There are three types of Civil Air Patrol squadrons:

- Cadet squadrons focus primarily on training, leadership development and activities for CAP cadets.
- Senior squadrons are dedicated towards allowing senior members to focus on CAP's missions, normally search and rescue activities.
- Composite squadrons offer programs for both cadets and senior members.

=== Group 1 ===
Group 1, Unit 167, conducts operations in Northern Colorado.

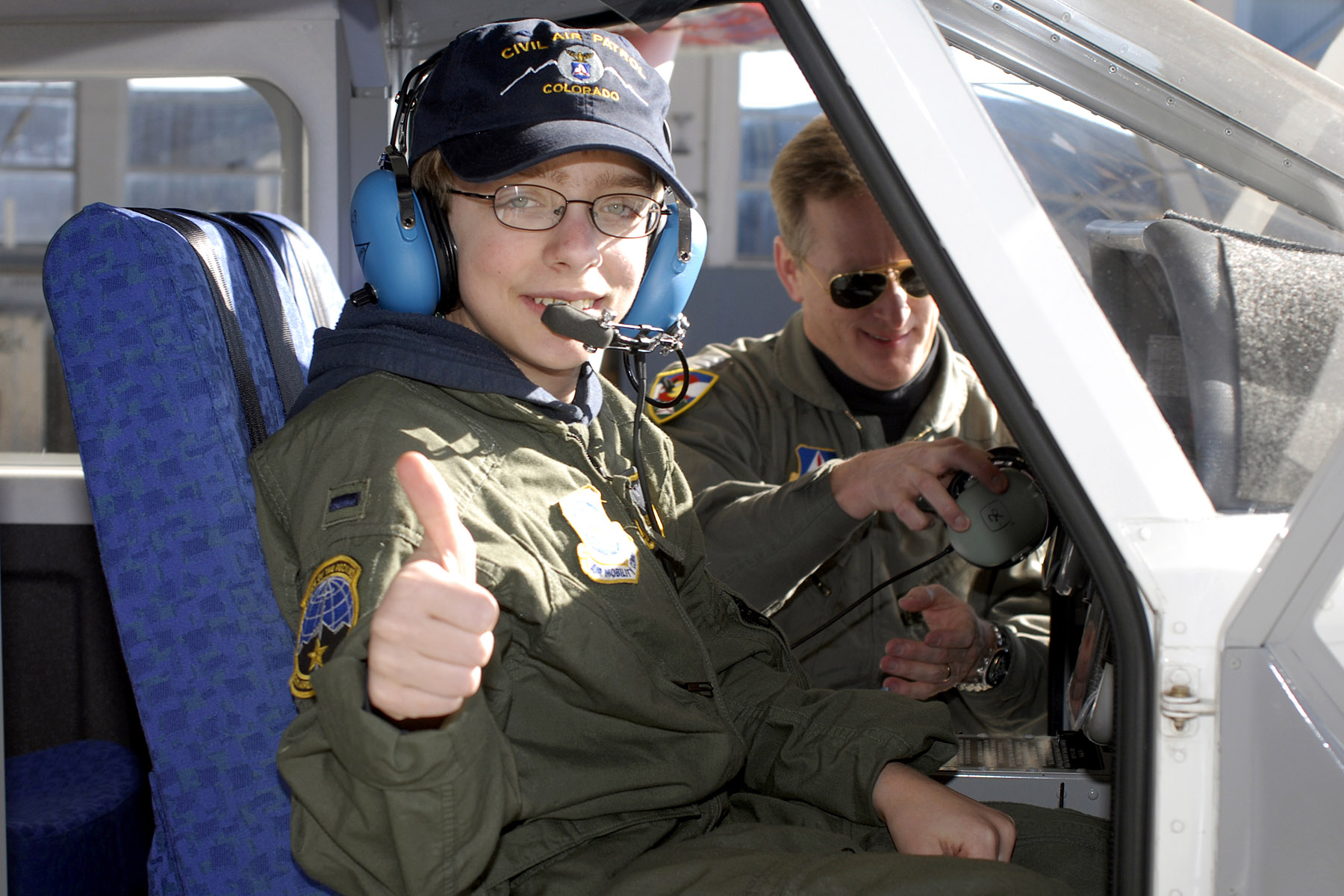
A youth gets acquainted with a Civil Air Patrol aircraft in Colorado.

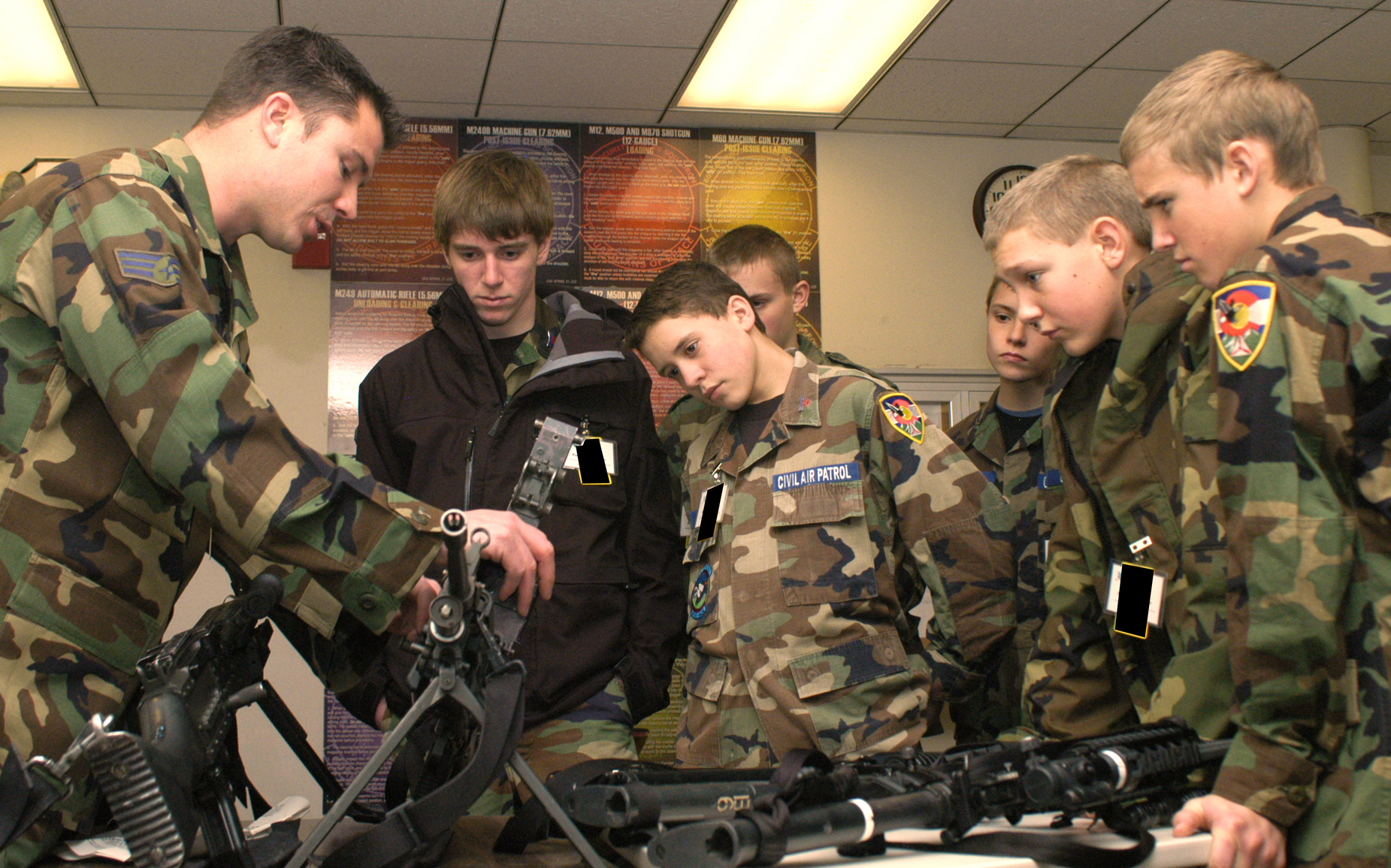
Senior Airman Paul Kelly explains weapon handling and safety to members of the Colorado Springs Cadet Squadron.

Squadrons of Group 1
Sqdn No.	Name/Type	City	Meets at
022	Vance Brand Cadet	Longmont	National Guard Armory building
068	North Valley Composite	Thornton	Village Baptist Church
072	Boulder Composite	Boulder	Boulder Municipal Airport (KDBU)
099	Broomfield Composite	Broomfield	First Baptist Church
136	Jefferson County Senior	Rocky Mountain Metro Airport	Mt Evans Rm, RMMA Terminal Bldg (2d floor)
147	Thompson Valley Composite	Fort Collins	COARNG Recruiting, Laporte Ave, Fort Collins
191	Platte Valley Cadet	Fort Lupton	COANG Readiness Center, Fort Lupton

=== Group 2 ===
Group 2, Unit 169, conducts operations in Western Colorado.

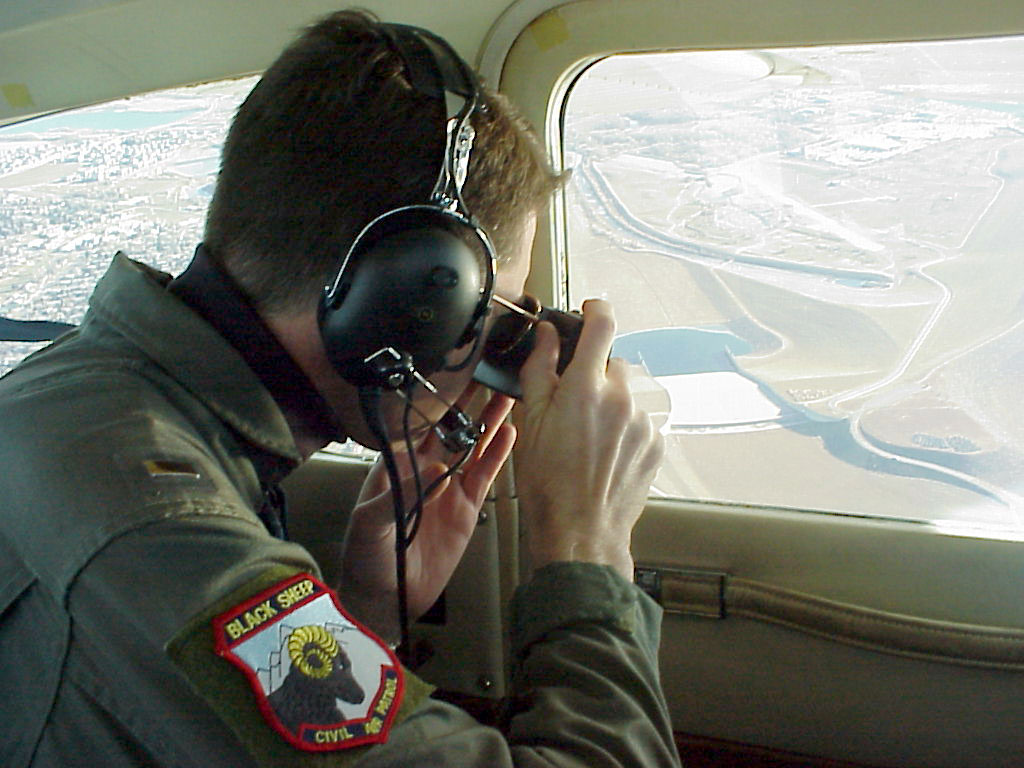
First Lt. Chad Morris of Civil Air Patrol's Colorado wing photographs a sports utility vehicle from 1,000 feet during a homeland security mission simulation.

Squadrons of Group 2
Sqdn No.	Name/Type	City	Meets at
015	Thunder Mountain Composite	Grand Junction	Western Region One Source Bldg. & Grand Junction Regional Airport
053	Eagle County Composite	Gyspum	Colorado National Guard Armory in Gypsum
181	Steamboat Springs Composite	Steamboat Springs	Steamboat Springs Airport
189	Mesa Verde Composite	Cortez	American Legion Building, Cortez, CO

=== Group 3 ===
Group 3, Unit 165, conducts operations in Southern Colorado.

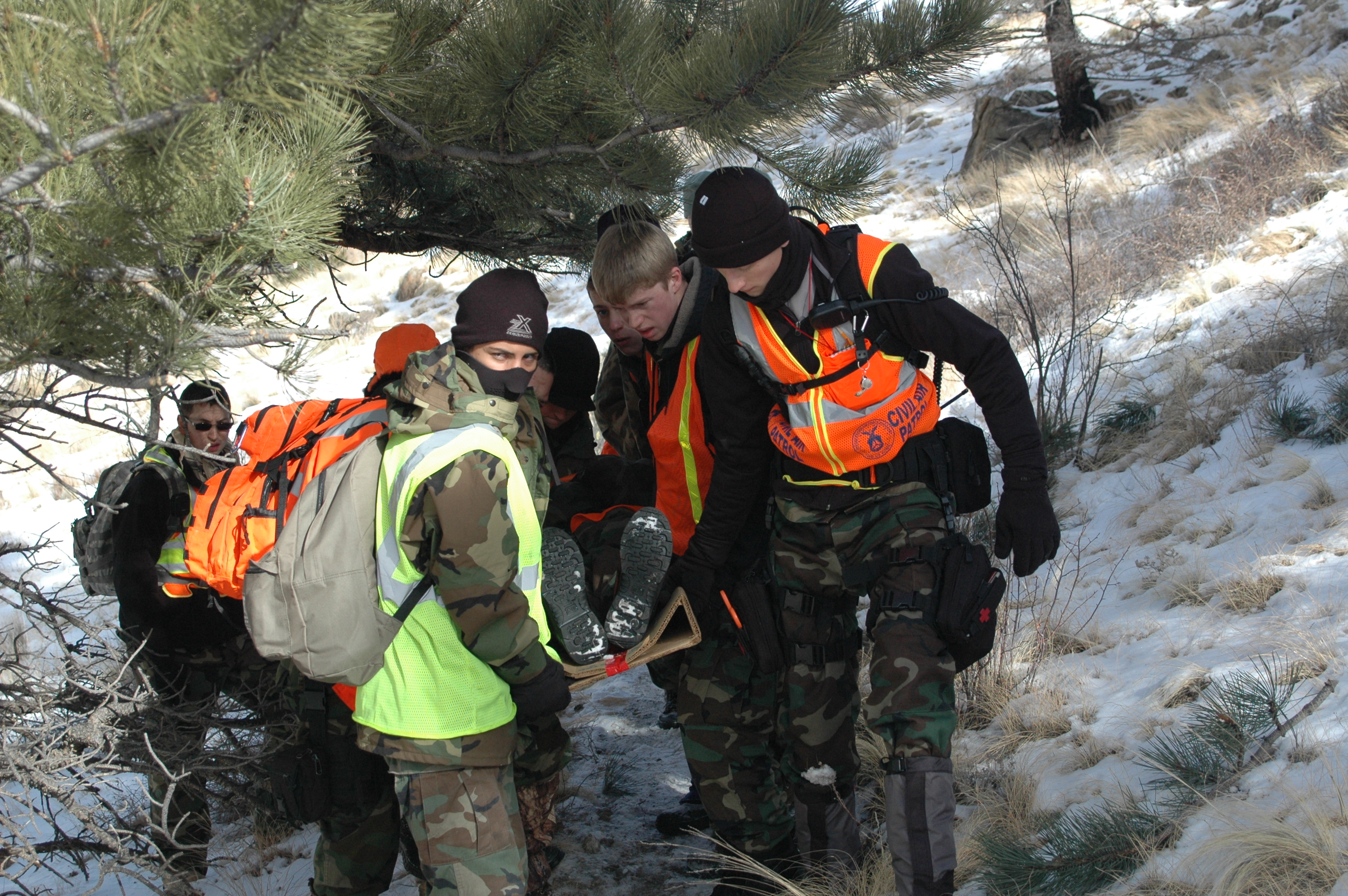
Cadets from the Colorado Springs Cadet Squadron at Peterson AFB participate in winter training.

Squadrons of Group 3
Sqdn No.	Name/Type	Location	Meets at
030	Colorado Springs Cadet	Peterson SFB	Peterson SFB, Building 350
080	Pikes Peak Composite	Peterson SFB	Vosler NCO Academy, Peterson SFB & EAA Chapter 72 at Meadowlake Airport
098	Fremont-Starfire Cadet	Cañon City	Fremont County Airport
159	Air Academy Cadet	USAF Academy	USAFA (various locations on site)
805	Colorado Military Academy	Colorado Springs	
807	Merit Academy	Woodland Park	

=== Group 4 ===
Group 4, Unit 164, conducts operations in the Denver Metro area.

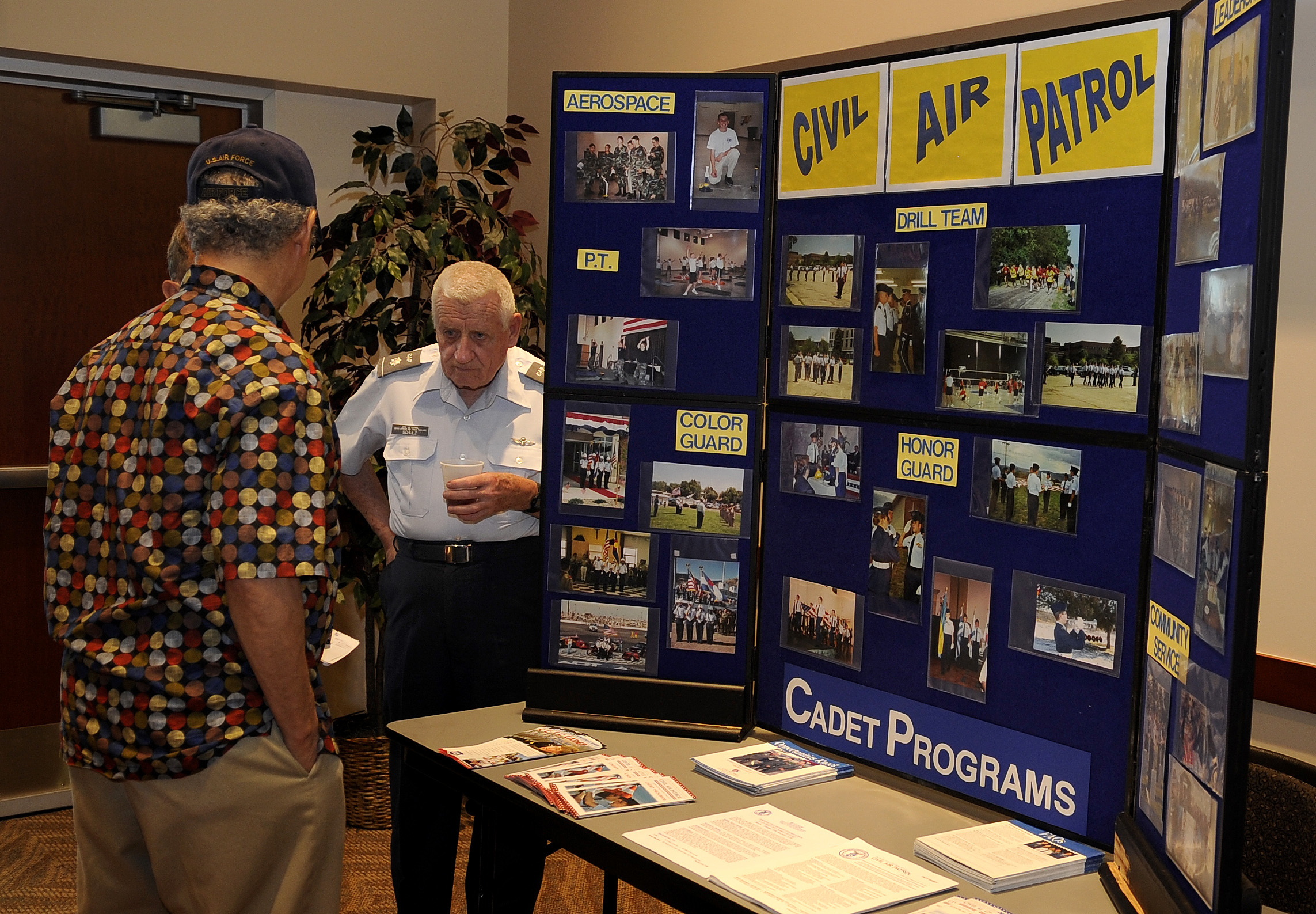
A member of the Colorado Wing of Civil Air Patrol speaks to military veterans while manning a recruitment booth.

Squadrons of Group 4
Sqdn No.	Name/Type	City	Meets at
031	Foothills Cadet	Lakewood	Jacob Academy in Lakewood
143	Mile High Cadet	Aurora	Buckley Space Force Base
148	Mustang Cadet	Centenntial	CO Department of Military & Veteran Affairs
157	Castle Rock Cadet	Castle Rock	New Hope Presbyterian Church
162	Black Sheep Senior	Centennial	South Metro Fire Rescue HQ
163	Highlander Composite	Highlands Ranch	Highlands Ranch Law Enforcement Training Facility
173	Parker Cadet	Parker	Parker United Methodist Church
183	Valkyrie Cadet	Denver	Wings Over the Rockies Museum
186	Dakota Ridge Composite	Littleton	Waterstone Community Church

== Encampment ==
Cadet encampments, usually a week in length, provide cadets with an intense look at military life. Encampment attendance is a prerequisite for the Gen. Billy Mitchell Award. Senior members may also be awarded the ribbon for providing leadership at CAP encampments.

Colorado Wing's Encampment has been held at the US Air Force Academy, Ft Carson, and Peterson SFB in Colorado Springs, CO.

== Emergency services ==
=== Ground search and rescue ===
The Wing operates a ground search and rescue ("GSAR") school on an annual basis, normally held in the Gore Range of the Rocky Mountains, west of Kremmling To participate, Cadets must be at least 14 years old, hold the rank of at least Cadet Senior Airman, successfully pass a physical fitness test, and have previous participation in cadet summer activities. Additionally, all participants must have completed basic training in emergency services (offered by the Federal Emergency Management Agency) and be able to hike long distances with a 20-25 pound pack. Participants spend the entire school (normally, eight days) in a field environment, and are awarded a Ground Team member badge at the successful completion of the school.

=== Air search and rescue ===
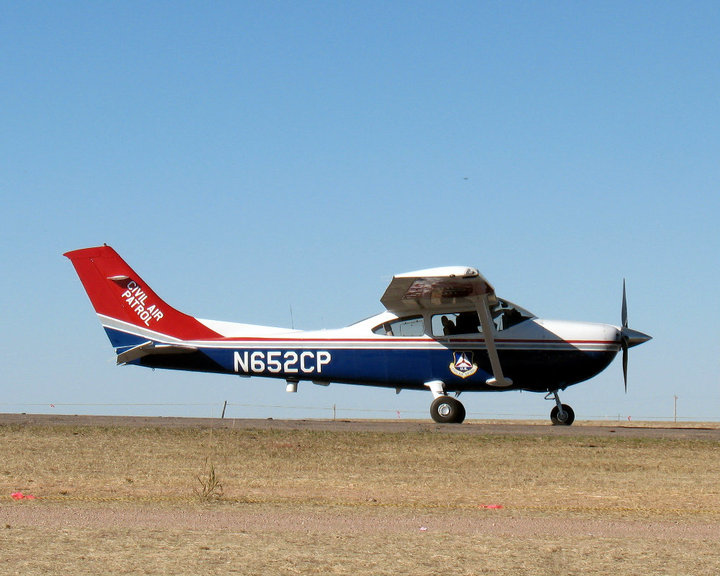
N652CP sits on the ramp at Akron Airport, Colorado.

CAP cadets can qualify to participate in FAA-approved air-search flights as observers with a CAP-certified pilot. Cadets with their pilot-in-command license can qualify as cadet pilots for air-search flights. Training is provided, along with age and license requirements.

=== Covid-19 response ===
In April 2020, pilots from Colorado Wing made multiple flights across Colorado, distributing personal protective equipment to medical facilities and first responders across the state, as a part of Colorado's response to the COVID-19 pandemic.

== Legal protection ==
Members of Civil Air Patrol who are employed within the borders of Colorado are guaranteed protection from discrimination or firing from their employer based on their membership in Civil Air Patrol. Employers are also legally prohibited from preventing an employee from taking a leave of absence from their employment to respond to emergencies as a part of Civil Air Patrol. These rights are guaranteed under Colorado Revised Statutes § 28-1-103.

== See also ==
- Colorado Air National Guard
- Colorado State Defense Force
