= Kansas forts and posts =

Kansas has always been home to many forts and military posts.

== Prior to 1854 ==
Kansas had a few military forts prior to 1854, when it became a territory. The French established Fort de Cavagnial near what is now Fort Leavenworth. This was the first military post in what is now Kansas. It operated from 1744 to 1764. The United States obtained possession to most of present-day Kansas in 1803 with the Louisiana Purchase. By 1854 a handful of US Army posts existed in Kansas. These were mainly to protect travelers along several trails from Indian attacks.

== Territorial Kansas (1854–1861) ==
The Kansas–Nebraska Act was passed by Congress on May 30, 1854. This act organized the new territories of Kansas and Nebraska and opened them to white settlement. The act allowed the inhabitants of the territories to decide whether they wanted slavery within their borders. As the north and south were by this time very polarized on many issues, this act was a recipe for civil strife in the new territories.

Even before the territories were officially opened to settlement, organizations in both the north and south began sponsoring settlers loyal to their respective causes. Northerners and southerners many times settled in close proximity. Many looked to settling Kansas as crucial to their causes. Immediately civil war erupted in Kansas. This warfare waxed and waned until finally ending with the end of the US Civil War in 1865.

Prior to the rush to settle Kansas only a handful of US Army posts existed. In June 1854 the Army only maintained Fort Atkinson, Fort Riley and Fort Leavenworth. Fort Scott had been closed by this time. In the western three-fourths of present-day Kansas the Indians were hostile to whites. The Indians in the eastern portion of the territory were usually more receptive to the settlers. Thus virtually all the settlers and forts existed in eastern Kansas.

The advent of settlement radically changed the Army's role in Kansas. Probably never in US history was a territory settled by groups who so distrusted and even despised each other. Now the Army had to become a police force preventing the hostile parties from fighting and committing atrocities. A number of semi-permanent Army camps were established to protect the settlers from each other. While the permanent posts contained buildings that were constructed of permanent materials, the camps usually only contained tents. One camp, Camp Sackett, actually changed locations several times when the troopers' horses overgrazed the prairies around the camp.

The Army sent men to its posts who later fought on both sides of the Civil War. Future Civil War generals serving in Kansas Territory included Nathaniel Lyon, J. E. B. Stuart and Philip St. George Cooke.

The partisan forces set up their own forts and camps. Most were log cabins fortified in one way or another. Most had loopholes for rifles and some partisan militias owned mountain howitzers, small cannons that could easily be moved.

Many partisan earthwork forts were erected and at least one was built of stone. A number of individual settlers built cabins and houses fortified by various means. All these fortified houses contained rifle loopholes.

Partisan leaders such as James Lane, James "Fighting Preacher" Stewart and Sheriff Samuel Jones spurred their followers into action. Many battles resulted and many were fought to destroy the forts of opposing forces. Added to this were raids by Missouarians against northern settlers in Kansas and Kansas Jayhawker raids into Missouri. Finally, the more radical abolitionists associated with John Brown stirred up hostilities. Amazingly, only about fifty men were killed in the partisan warfare in territorial times.

The most serious period of territorial warfare began with the Wakarusa War, conducted in November and December 1855. At that time Lawrence was first threatened by Missouri partisans. The situation was defused, but on May 21, 1856, another southern army occupied Lawrence, causing considerable damage. Two days later John Brown's group brutally murdered five southerners near Osawatomie and a real war began in earnest. Only the neutralization of four southern forts (Fort Titus, Fort Saunders and forts in the towns of Franklin and New Georgia) brought a semblance of peace.

A number of settlers in areas isolated from the hostilities constructed new forts to protect their communities against Indian raids. These included two forts in Washington, Kansas, a fort in Iola and Fort Drinkwater.

The numbers of forts and posts in the territory were modest. In 1854–1855 five forts existed. They increased in number to 17 in 1856 and declined to nine by 1858. The numbers again increased to 17 by 1860.

== Civil War Years (1861–1865) ==
On January 29, 1861, Kansas was admitted to union as a free state, a defeat to the southern cause. Even then the southern element remained firmly entrenched in many eastern Kansas communities. Once the Civil War broke out, about 20,000 Missouri men joined the Union Army, while about 1,000 joined Confederate forces. However, many southerners threw wholehearted support to the Union, as they wanted Kansas to remain their home.

The transition from territorial status to statehood bought some changes in the types of forts existing in Kansas. Gone was the partisan rivalry. Still many settler forts existed to protect against Indian attacks. Possibly only one camp, Livingston's Hideout, existed as a Confederate post in Kansas during the Civil War. However, other permanent hideouts could have existed on the Kansas side of the border in the Wyandotte (Kansas City) and Olathe areas. All the rest were on the Union side. Also, the number of forts increased. The state had 26 in 1861 and the number increased to 43 by 1864. By war's end in 1865, the state still had 36 forts and posts.

The forts still served similar purposes as in territorial days. The Army maintained some to protect travelers and settlers against Indians. Some of the new Army posts, however, were established to protect communities along the Kansas–Missouri border from Confederate regular and guerrilla forces.

Other Army posts, such as Fort Scott, Fort Leavenworth and Fort Riley, served as administrative headquarters in the chain of forts stretching across the west. Forts Leavenworth and Scott also became major bases of operations to reclaim parts of the Indian Territory, Missouri and Arkansas from the Confederacy. Riley, Leavenworth and Scott were put to other miscellaneous uses. At times all three held numbers of Confederate prisoners. Leavenworth was used to convert captured Confederates into "Galvanized Yankees."

These Galvanized Yankees were Confederate prisoners organized into new Union companies used to man frontier forts deep in Indian-traversed territories. They were never used to fight fellow Confederates, as they may have refused to fight their former allies. Most Galvanized Yankees probably enlisted in such units to escape the grim conditions in prison camps.

These "reformed" Confederates were despised by other Union soldiers, because the latter figured these men had first proved themselves as traitors to the Union and then they had become traitors to the Confederacy. Thus they were seen as double traitors with no redeeming qualities. Also, the Galvanized Yankees could expect no respect back home in the south for joining the Union Army. It was no wonder they deserted in large numbers once deployed.

Fort Zarah and Fort Larned for a time had garrisons with large numbers of these former Confederate prisoners. The reason the Union resorted to outfitting Confederate prisoners was because the Army could spare few men to protect trails and settlers.

Incidentally, most of the forts established by the Army were manned at times totally by volunteer or militia forces raised to fight Confederates. Other functions given to Army forts included serving as post offices and becoming headquarters for Indian agencies. One fort, Fort Lincoln, was used for a time as a prison for captured Confederates.

Once the Civil War began, many communities established forts, most of them built of logs. Some of these forts had unique duties. In Humboldt, one was a fortified mill while another was a fortified dry goods store. Fort Drinkwater served as post office and Fort Montgomery (Eureka) served as a school house.

The strength of the military and community forts varied widely. Surprisingly, some of the forts built by communities were considerably more defendable than some built by the military. A few of the very strongest forts, however, were established by the Army. Fort Sully, built overlooking Fort Leavenworth, was built in a location making it practically impregnable. Camp Ben Butler, at Baxter Springs, was also perched in a practically impregnable location.

Weaker forts included Fort Larned, originally built mainly of adobe. Typically, many military forts started as groups of buildings and sod-roofed dugouts that would have been difficult to defend had full-scale attacks been mounted against them. Forts Dodge and Zarah also started as weak forts. Zarah ended up being transformed into one of the state's strongest forts.

Three events caused Kansas to rapidly build more forts and posts after the Civil War's outbreak. One was an unsuccessful effort by the Army to rid eastern Kansas of Confederate guerrilla attacks. Twice, in 1861 and 1862, regular Confederate forces moved into southeast Kansas. Also, Confederate Indian forces under Lt. Col. John Jumper in May 1862 organized to seize Fort Larned in southwest Kansas. The Indians lost interest in the venture and never reached the fort. The Army's main concern, however, was to protect Kansas against guerrilla bands that terrorized residents on both sides of the Kansas–Missouri border.

On March 13, 1863, Col. Thomas Ewing, Jr. was promoted to brigadier general and was given command of the District of the Border, which included all of Kansas, as well as parts of other jurisdictions. Ewing's responsibilities included keeping the border safe from guerrilla attacks. To accomplish this Ewing decided to string Army posts along the Kansas–Missouri border from the Missouri River in the north to the Indian Territory border to the south. He wanted enough posts so they would be no further than ten miles apart. Such new posts as Coldwater Grove, Potosi and a series of posts at Baxter Springs were constructed.

By summer 1863 it was assumed the string of posts along the border would end guerrilla depredations in Kansas. However, a number of small raids took place, one occurring as far west as Council Grove. The guerrillas eluded the Army's troops, many of whom were to inexperienced for their patrol duties. In addition, the Union forces many times had horses and weapons inferior in quality to those possessed by the guerrillas. Finally, a few of the Union officers under Ewing's command were downright incompetent.

Nevertheless, a false sense of security prevailed. Lawrence, for instance, even passed an ordinance barring its inhabitants from possessing firearms within the city limits. All arms and ammunition were to be locked inside the town's armory. Even the recruits in two camps in town had no ammunition and the commander of the squad of troops at Lawrence had to keep his sidearms in the armory.

This false sense of security was suddenly broken one hot and sunny August day. In the afternoon of August 20 guerrilla commander William C. Quantrill and almost 450 followers rode into Kansas and headed for Lawrence. Surprisingly, a number of individuals discovered Quantrill's movements and the garrison at Aubry, just west of the Missouri border, watched the guerrillas pass near their post. The post commander did not even bother to try to identify the passing force.

The next morning Quantrill's men stormed into a defenseless Lawrence and committed one of the Civil War's worst atrocities. Much of Lawrence was looted and burned. About 180 men and boys, virtually all defenseless, were shot dead. About 6,000 Union soldiers and Kansas and Missouri militiamen attempted to capture or destroy the guerrilla force, but virtually all the guerrillas got away. The retreating guerrillas even temporarily overran the post at Paola during their hasty retreat.

Ewing responded by issuing General Orders No. 11, which ordered the virtual depopulation of a large area on the Missouri side of the border. Part of the idea was to deprive the guerrillas of a base of operation. However, the guerrilla attacks continued unabated and many innocent Missourians were punished by Ewing's decree.

Quantrill even attacked Fort Blair (Fort Baxter), at present-day Baxter Springs, on October 6. Although the fort was successfully held, 91 Union soldiers and Army employees were killed and about 25 were wounded. Estimates of three to 30 guerrillas were killed and at least three were wounded. Many of the Union troops who died that day surrendered to Quantrill's men, who then murdered them in another of the war's worst atrocities.

Incidentally, most of the posts established by Ewing remained, despite the failure to stop guerrilla raids. They provided some deterrent. Without them probably more raids would have been conducted.

In 1864 increased confrontations with Indians resulted in new community and Army forts being built. Apparently in March 1864 many councils were held among the Indian tribes with the subject being attempts to keep whites out of Indian-occupied areas. By late spring Plains Indians began attacking white settlements and travelers in the western two-thirds of Kansas in an attempt to force out the whites.

One result was the occurrence of raids to secure horses from Fort Larned and Fort Ellsworth. Also, since all troops who could be spared were sent to fight Confederates, galvanized Yankee units were used to strengthen some garrisons. Some settler forts were put to use to guard communities against Indian attacks. A number of new Army posts and community forts were built to protect areas against hostile Indians. The western two-thirds of Kansas went under siege through the next winter.

In fall 1864 Maj. Gen. Sterling Price, a former Missouri governor, was chosen to lead a Confederate invasion (Price's Missouri Raid) to capture St. Louis and invade Illinois. This invasion began August 28, when Price started in southwest Arkansas with 12,000 ill-equipped troops. He expected to conquer and hold St. Louis. When confronted by 6,000 Union troops there, Price changed his plans. He decided instead to reclaim Missouri for the Confederacy.

Price was constantly confronted by Federal troops or Missouri state militia and was unable to permanently occupy any areas. His invasion turned into a glorified raid, as he was cut off from Confederate support in Arkansas and Texas. However, when Price turned west from St. Louis, Kansas authorities became concerned. By mid-October Price was nearing Kansas City.

The threat by Price caused a reaction that changed the status of many forts and posts in eastern Kansas. Many localities sent troops to meet the Confederates. A number of small Army posts were vacated or pared to skeleton garrisons so as many soldiers as possible could face Price's men. New forts were established to help defend Fort Leavenworth, Lawrence and Topeka (the state capital) against Confederates.

The threat to eastern Kansas was very real. Price commented that he wanted to dine at Fort Leavenworth, an indication he hoped to capture that important post. Price kept moving west, but was decisively defeated October 23 in the Battle of Westport. Westport was just southeast of Kansas City. This defeat ended the Confederate advances and forced the invaders into a quick retreat toward safe territory.

This retreat was along the Kansas–Missouri border and the presence of so many Confederates disrupted the line of posts established by Ewing. On the way south a number of posts were threatened and the Army posts at Trading Post and Potosi were briefly occupied by Price's men. On October 25 the Confederates were again defeated in the Battle of Mine Creek. Mine Creek was near Mound City, the site of another major post.

The day of the battle the old post of Fort Lincoln was destroyed by Confederates. After threatening the city and post of Fort Scott, Price's troops left the area. Several of the posts abandoned by the Federals during Price's raid were not reopened. The fighting left many wounded on both sides and many of these were taken to Mound City and Fort Leavenworth.

With the end of Price's raid the guerrilla activity along the border waned. It never fully disappeared until about a year after Gen. Robert E. Lee's surrender in Virginia in April 1865. It was only then that most of the community and Army posts closed, no longer being needed.

== World War II ==
During World War II much military activity came to Kansas. Existing posts saw large numbers of men being trained for war. New facilities, mainly airfields, were constructed.

=== Army Airfields in Kansas ===
The article Kansas World War II army airfields contains much information about US Army Air Force facilities in Kansas. Many were training fields. A summary of the World War II Army airfields is listed below:

- Coffeyville Army Airfield, Coffeyville, Kansas. This airfield was seven miles northeast of Coffeyville. Opened in 1942, its mission was to train pilots. It was closed in October 1945 and remained on inactive status until 1947, when everything there was sold. This site became the Coffeyville Municipal Airport. At some point the Coffeyville site for the Kansas Army National Guard was placed in the northeast part of what was the Army Airfield, where is remains today.
- Dodge City Army Airfield, Dodge City, Kansas. This facility, located 6 miles (9.7 km) northwest of town, was a training base. It originally trained Royal Air Force and Free French pilots. It then trained American men and women (Women Air Force Service Pilots). The field closed in July 1945 and it was listed as an inactive reserve facility. In 1948 it was designated as the Dodge City Air Force Base, but it was never manned. About 1949 it became the Dodge City Municipal Airport and was eventually closed and abandoned.
- Fairfax Army Airfield, Kansas City, Kansas. This airfield was originally a civilian airport and under the control of the City of Kansas City, Kansas. It was then Fairfax Airport. In 1941 it was leased by the US Army. In World War II B-25 Mitchell bombers at this airfield. In 1942 a USAAF Modification Center was built here to modify aircraft for use in specific theaters of the war and for specific purposes. This field also served as a military air freight center at the end of the war. Until 1954 parts of this field still military functions. in 1949 part of the field was returned to use as a public airport and as such it finally closed in 1985.
- Garden City Army Airfield, Garden City, Kansas. Construction on this training field began 12 miles (19 km) east of Garden City in June 1942. Construction was completed in May 1943, but pilot training began before everything was finished. In November 1944 it was decided to cease flight training and the airfield was placed on inactive status. In February 1945 this field became a strategic aircraft storage facility. This use of the field was discontinued in October 1946 and the field was eventually turned over to Garden City in 1948, which opened the facility as Garden City Regional Airport.
- Great Bend Army Airfield, Great Bend, Kansas. This training field was built in late 1942 and it remained active until December 1945. It was located 5.6 miles (9.0 km) southwest of Great Bend. In 1946 part of the airfield was deeded to the City of Great Bend as surplus property. The northern runway became a drag strip about 1953 and the use of this drag strip continues to the present. The Barton County Speedway, no longer used, was built just west of the drag strip. Great Bend Army Airfield was on inactive status until 1951. In 1949 and maybe in 1950 an Air Force reserve unit used it for a while. At some point the Great Bend National Guard Armory, still in use, was constructed just to the north of the drag strip. The armory, drag strip and the Speedway are all inside what was the northern part of the airfield. The Army airfield eventually became the Great Bend Municipal Airport.
- Herington Army Airfield, Herington, Kansas. This airfield, 8 miles (13 km) east of Herington, was built to be a staging area to prepare airplanes, supplies and personnel prior to their deployment to war zones. Construction of the field began in September 1942. The field was in use until November 1942 and it was placed on inactive status. It eventually became Herington Regional Airport.
- Independence Army Airfield, Independence, Kansas. In June 1942 construction began on this airfield, located 6 miles (9.7 km) southwest of Independence. If was run as a training facility until March 1945. In April 1945 it became an aircraft storage depot and it served as such until 1947. It was closed in December 1947 and eventually in became Independence Municipal Airport.
- Liberal Army Airfield, Liberal, Kansas. This airfield, adjacent to the west side of Liberal, was used to train personnel who would be working with B-24 Liberator flying fortresses. Construction was begun in January 1943. The field was active until October 1945 and it was placed on inactive status. In July 1947 the old airfield was acquired from the U.S. government and became Liberal Municipal Airport. It eventually became the Liberal Mid-America Regional Airport.
- Pratt Army Airfield, Pratt, Kansas. Construction on this training field begun in September 1942. Training was done for troops working with the B-29 Superfortress bombers. The last training was done in December 1945 and this field was placed on inactive status. After the field was inactivated it eventually was turned over to local government officials and it became Pratt Regional Airport. In the early 1950s testing for two new military aircraft was conducted at this airport.
- Sherman Army Airfield, Fort Leavenworth, Kansas. This facility still exists, having never been abandoned by the military.
- Smoky Hill Army Airfield, Salina, Kansas. Construction of this airfield began in May 1942. This was another training air field for bomber crews and others who were to man bombers. The last crew training ended in October 1945. This airfield continued to operate under the United States Air Force. The name of the field was changed to Smoky Hill Air Force Base in 1948 and then to Schilling Air Force Base in 1957. Schilling was closed in 1965, but some functions there continued. Today the Kansas Army National Guard occupies some of the air base buildings. Much of the old air base is now Salina Municipal Airport.
- Strother Army Airfield. This facility was between Winfield, Kansas, and Arkansas City, Kansas. It was about 4 miles (6.4 km) from each city. It was in the process of becoming a municipal airport jointly operated by both cities when World War II erupted, causing it to be leased to the U.S. Army. Construction was begun in May 1942. It was another training field. Basic flight training and advanced fighter training were done here until August 1945. In December 1945 this airfield became inactive and it was unmanned. It was intermittently used, being renamed Strother Air Force Base. After this it became Stother Field Airport, the municipal airport was first intended to be.
- Topeka Army Airfield, Pauline, Kansas. This military facility has undergone a number of changes since its beginning. In early 1942 construction was begun on this airfield, which was used for B-29 Superfortress bomber training. Through World War II this training continued. This field was inactivated in October 1947. In July 1948 this field was reactivated as Forbes Air Force Base. Deactivated in October 1949, Forbes AFB was reactivated in February 1952. The Base continued operation until it was closed in 1973. However, much of the northern portion of the Base was transferred to the Kansas Air National Guard and operates today as Forbes Field Air National Guard Base. The entire old base was renamed Forbes Field. The National Guard shares used of the runways with Topeka Regional Airport, which replaced Topeka Municipal Airport in the Oakland section of town, took over a small portion of the base.
- Walker Army Airfield, 2.93 miles (4.72 km) northeast of Victoria, Kansas. This was used for B-29 Superfortress bomber training. Construction began in September 1942. In January 1946 Walker was placed on inactive status. The various buildings, equipment, etc., were sold. One hangar was used between 1948 and 1952 for crop dusting airplanes, grain was stored in others and for a time runways were used for drag racing. In 1948 the airfield was taken over by the U.S. Air Force and the field was named Victoria Auxiliary Field. No Air Force personnel were apparently stationed there. The air field became completely abandoned by 1968, although a runway was used in 1971 to test for the effects of bombs crating craters. The airfield is entirely in private hands today and is not used.
- Wichita Army Airfield, Wichita, Kansas. In 1929 construction began on this airfield, which was Wichita Municipal Airport. In August 1941 a Kansas National Guard air unit was stationed. It was placed on active duty in October. During World War II most of the airfield was taken over by the Army Air Force. B-29 Superfortress bombers were manufactured here. After the end of the war bomber production ceased and in November 1946 the airfield again served as the municipal airport. In summer 1950 Boeing began production of the B-57 Stratojet bomber at the airfield. In May 1951 this field became McConnell Air Force Base and civilian air traffic was handled by a new municipal airport at another location. McConnell has remained open ever since.
- Eight auxiliary Army airfields were associated with various Army airfields. After the end of the War some reverted to agricultural uses of the land on which they were built. Some became landing fields for crop duster airplanes or became other private air strips.

=== Naval air stations in Kansas ===
In addition to the Army air fields were two Naval air stations. These were:

- Naval Air Station Hutchinson, Reno County, Kansas. This facility was located 6.6 miles (10.6 km) south of Hutchinson, Kansas. This Naval Air Station was built on farm land purchased from the Amish. Construction began in July 1942. The facility was originally called the Naval Reserve Aviation Base Hutchinson and construction was completed in October 1942. This station was used in the training of U.S. Navy pilots. In January 1943 the station became known at the Naval Air Station Hutchinson. Training continued until October 1946. The station, used for civilian activities not related to aviation, fell into disrepair. From 1952 to 1958 the Naval Air Station was reactivated. From 1951 to 1968 a radar squadron was on the site, designated as the Hutchinson Air Force Station. After that the radar facilities were taken over by the Federal Aviation Administration. Other parts of the old Naval air station were put to other uses and a part is the privately owned Sunflower Aerodrome Gliderport.
- Naval Air Station Olathe, 1 mile (1.6 km) northeast of Gardner, Kansas. This facility was operated as a U.S. Navy pilot training center and as a Naval Air Transport Service center. It was opened in October 1942 and operated throughout World War II. It was originally called the Gardner, Kansas, Navy Base. Future astronaut and U.S. Senator John Glenn received flight training there. The use of this Naval Air Station continued after the war. It evolved into a center that is today a joint civilian-military air field.
- Four auxiliary fields were associated with the two Naval air stations.

=== Miscellaneous facilities in Kansas ===
- Sunflower Ordnance Works, southwest of De Soto, Kansas. This plant was opened in 1942 and the facilities were owned by the U.S. government. It was operated by Hercules Powder Company. Hercules eventually changed its name to Hercules Incorporated. During World War II this facility produced 200,000,000 pounds (91,000,000 kg) of propellents and it employed more than 12,000 people. The plant's name was changed several times after the War and it was put on standby and put back into production twice. It finally was closed in 2001.

=== Prisoner of war camps in Kansas ===
Kansas kept prisoners-of-war from Germany and Italy in fifteen locations in Kansas. Some were kept in the two large Army posts, Fort Riley and Fort Leavenworth. Others were kept in locations scattered through the state, including Camp Phillips, near Smolan, Kansas. Camp Phillips was a camp used to train 75,000 to 80,000 soldiers for a tank destroyer battalion. About 3,00 German and Italian prisoners-of-war (POWs) were also kept there.

- Camp Concordia, 2 miles (3.2 km) northeast of Concordia, Kansas. This camp was used to house mainly German POWs from 1943 to 1945. It was the largest POW camp in Kansas. It held more than 4,000 prisoners, possibly 8,00 prisoners. This camp consisted of 300 buildings and it was staffed by 800 American soldiers. Among the first prisoners were German officers, forty-four of which were said to be Nazis. These were moved to other camps after some violent incidents.
- Lawrence site, Lawrence, Kansas. Built in town and opened in April 1945, this single-building facility housed 100 POWs, it seems from Germany. It closed in November 1945. Among the projects completed by the prisoners were two projects on the University of Kansas campus, the building of Danforth Chapel and the planting of hundreds of crab apple trees on campus.
