= John Eastwood =

John Eastwood may refer to:

- John H. Eastwood (1911–2007), World War II US Army Chaplain
- John S. Eastwood (1857–1924), American engineer who built the world's first reinforced concrete multiple arch dam
- John Eastwood (politician) (1887–1952), British Conservative Member of Parliament
