= General Bishop =

General Bishop may refer to:

- Alec Bishop (1897–1984), British Army major general
- Harry Gore Bishop (1874–1934), U.S. Army major general
- Percy Poe Bishop (1877–1967), U.S. Army major general
