= KFLV =

KFLV may refer to:

- KFLV (FM), a radio station (89.9 FM) licensed to Wilber, Nebraska, United States
- the ICAO code for Sherman Army Airfield
