= Kansas World War II army airfields =

Kansas World War II army airfields
- Part of World War II
- Map Of Kansas World War II army airfields

Site information
- Type: Army airfields
- Controlled by: United States Army Air Forces

Site history
- Built: 1940–1944
- In use: 1940–present

During World War II, Kansas was a major United States Army Air Forces (USAAF) training center for pilots and aircrews of USAAF fighters and bombers. Kansas was favored because it has excellent, year-round flying conditions. The sparsely populated land made ideal locations for gunnery, bombing, and training ranges.

The training that was given to the airmen stationed at these airfields gave them the skills and knowledge that enabled them to enter combat in all theaters of warfare, and enabled the Allies to defeat Nazi Germany and Imperial Japan.

The majority of these airfields were located in rural farmland, near small farming towns. The effect of stationing thousands of airmen brought the reality of war to rural and small town Kansas. In addition to providing training for servicemen, the air bases provided jobs for many civilians. Civilians were employed in maintenance, repair, and secretarial work.

== Major airfields ==
| USAAF Name Current Name | Command | Mission | Location | Coordinates | Notes |
|---|---|---|---|---|---|
| Coffeyville Army Airfield; Coffeyville Municipal Airport | Army Air Forces Training Command; Third Air Force | Phase 2 Basic flying training Reconnaissance Pilot Training | Coffeyville | 37°05′39″N 095°34′19″W | Aircraft operated were Vultee BT-13A Valiants (1942–1944), F-5 Lightnings, and F-10 Mitchells (1944–1945) Closed 1945. Now Coffeyville Municipal Airport (CFV). |
| Dodge City Army Airfield | Army Air Forces Training Command | Specialized 2-Engine flying training school (B-26 Marauders) | Dodge City | 37°47′53″N 100°07′00″W | Originally trained Royal Air Force and Free French pilots in basic flight training. Became B-26 Marauder training base. In addition, was a training facility for Women Airforce Service Pilots (WASPs). Closed 1945. Now abandoned. |
| Fairfax Army Airfield; Fairfax Airport | Air Technical Service Command; Air Transport Command | B-25 Mitchell manufacturing | Fairfax | 39°08′53″N 094°35′58″W | Manufactured 1/2 of all B-25's built during World War II (B-25D, B-25J). ATSC modification center; ATC ferrying base for new aircraft; transport hub on mid-America transport route. After the war it became GM Buick assembly plant; manufactured F-84F Thunderstreaks during the 1950s. Airport closed on April 1, 1985. |
| Garden City Army Airfield; Garden City Regional Airport | Army Air Forces Training Command; Air Technical Service Command | Phase 2 Basic flying training Aircraft storage depot | Garden City | 37°55′39″N 100°43′28″W | Aircraft operated were Vultee BT-13A Valiants. Also AT-17 (UC-78) advance training beginning in 1943. Closed 1944 and became aircraft storage depot until 1946. Now Garden City Regional Airport (GCK). |
| Great Bend Army Airfield; Great Bend Municipal Airport | Second Air Force | B-29 Superfortress bomber training | Great Bend | 38°20′47″N 098°51′55″W | One of three B-29 training bases in Kansas for the 58th Bombardment Wing, the first B-29 combat unit of World War II. Also used legacy B-17Fs for pilot training. Closed 1945. Now Great Bend Municipal Airport (GBD). |
| Herington Army Airfield; Herington Regional Airport | Second Air Force | Unit staging base | Herington | 38°41′41″N 096°48′29″W | Processed B-24 Liberator; later B-29 Superfortress aircrews prior to overseas deployment Closed October 1945. Now Herington Regional Airport (HRU). |
| Independence Army Airfield; Independence Municipal Airport (Kansas) | Army Air Forces Training Command; Air Technical Service Command | Phase 2 Basic flying training Aircraft storage depot | Independence | 38°41′41″N 096°48′29″W | Aircraft operated North American BT-14 Yale. Closed 1945 and became aircraft storage depot until 1947. Now Independence Municipal Airport (IDP). |
| Liberal Army Airfield; Liberal Mid-America Regional Airport | Second Air Force | B-24 Liberator Basic Training School | Liberal | 37°02′39″N 100°57′36″W | Closed 1945. Now Liberal Mid-America Regional Airport (LBL). |
| Marshall Army Airfield | Third Air Force | Used by Fort Riley for light observation aircraft | Fort Riley | 39°03′09″N 096°45′52″W | Later Marshall AFB under ConAC. Turned over to Army in 1950. Still active under United States Army jurisdiction (FRI). |
| Pratt Army Airfield; Pratt Regional Airport | Second Air Force | B-29 Superfortress bomber training | Pratt | 37°42′18″N 098°45′15″W | One of three B-29 training bases in Kansas for the 58th Bombardment Wing, the first B-29 combat unit of World War II. Closed 1945. Now Pratt Regional Airport (PTT). |
| Sherman Army Airfield | Third Air Force | Used by Fort Leavenworth for light observation aircraft | Fort Leavenworth | 39°22′06″N 094°54′53″W | Later Sherman AFB under ConAC. Turned over to Army in 1953. Still active under United States Army jurisdiction operated as joint military-civil use airport for light aircraft (FLV). |
| Smoky Hill Army Airfield; Schilling Air Force Base; Salina Regional Airport | Second Air Force 15th Air Force SAC 3/21/1946; Strategic Air Command | B-29 Superfortress bomber training SAC B-47/ICBM Base | Salina | 38°47′40″N 097°38′45″W | One of three B-29 training bases in Kansas for the 58th Bombardment Wing, the first B-29 combat unit of World War II. Major Strategic Air Command base during the early Cold War Era (1951–1965). Now Salina Regional Airport (SLN). |
| Strother Army Air Field; Strother Field | Army Air Forces Training Command; II Fighter Command | Phase 2 Basic flying training Advanced Fighter Training | Winfield | 37°10′07″N 097°02′15″W | Aircraft operated were Vultee BT-13A Valiants. Later P-47D Thunderbolts. Closed 1945. Now Strother Field (WLD). |
| Topeka Army Airfield; Forbes Air Force Base; Forbes Field Air National Guard Base | Second Air Force; Strategic Air Command; Tactical Air Command | B-29 Superfortress bomber training SAC Bomber/ICBM Base/TAC Airlift base Kansas Air National Guard | Topeka | 38°57′04″N 095°39′57″W | In continuous military use since 1941. Initially B-29 replacement aircrew training base. Later in use by SAC and TAC during Cold War. Now Kansas Air National Guard joint civil-military airport with KC-135. |
| Walker Army Airfield | Second Air Force | B-29 Superfortress bomber training | Walker | 38°53′40″N 099°06′05″W | B-29 replacement aircrew training base. Closed 1945. Now abandoned. |
| Wichita Army Airfield; McConnell Air Force Base | Air Technical Service Command; Air Transport Command; Strategic Air Command; Air Mobility Command | B-29 Superfortress manufacturing SAC Bomber/ICBM Base; Refueling tanker base | Wichita | 37°37′23″N 097°16′02″W | Boeing B-29 Superfortress manufacturing during World War II; ATSC modification center; ATC ferrying base for new aircraft; transport hub on mid-America transport route. Later B-47 manufacturing facility during the 1950s. Major SAC base with B-52/KC-135 and Titan II followed by B-1B until 1992; now AMC KC-135 tanker base. |

== Postwar use ==
After the war ended, the vast majority of these airfields were declared surplus by the USAAF and were either sold to the public or turned over to the local community. Most of them today are small, rural general aviation airports. Many World War II-era reminders remain with abandoned runways and streets, with some wartime-era buildings still in use.

Marshall AAF is located at Fort Riley. It is still in use by the United States Army as a military airfield and is not open to the public.

Sherman AAF is located at Fort Leavenworth. Although the airfield is within the confines of a United States Army post and is still used by the military, it has agreement with the city of Leavenworth to permit civilian use at all hours.

Smoky Hill AAF and Topeka AAF became major United States Air Force Strategic Air Command (SAC) bases (Schilling AFB, Forbes AFB). In the 1960s and early 1970s, the active duty Air Force presence was withdrawn and were turned over to the local communities for redevelopment while retaining military cantonment areas for the Air National Guard. Both are still in use by the Kansas Air National Guard, the former for transient military aircraft operations and operation of an adjacent ANG-controlled bombing range, the latter as a tanker base for KC-135 aircraft.

Wichita Army Airfield (now McConnell Air Force Base) is located at the site of Wichita's original municipal airport, which shared a runway with the Boeing Aircraft Wichita facility. Boeing produced B-29 Superfortresses at Wichita and the USAAF Air Materiel Command took over control of the airport in 1942 to accept, service and coordinate the transfer of newly produced aircraft to other installations. It was returned to civilian jurisdiction in 1946 as Wichita Municipal Airport. It was reacquired by the United States Air Force in 1951 and became McConnell AFB.
