= Seventh Corps Area =

Military district

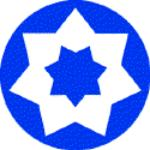
- Active: 20 August 1920–7 December 1941
- Country: United States of America
- Branch: United States Army
- Type: Military District
- Role: Training
- Part of: Department of War
- Garrison/HQ: Fort Crook, NE; Fort Omaha, NE; Omaha, NE

The Seventh Corps Area was a Corps area, effectively a military district, of the United States Army active from 1920 to 1941. It initially was responsible for army forces in Kansas, Minnesota, Missouri (but not Jefferson Barracks), North Dakota, South Dakota, Iowa and Nebraska. Army responsibility for Arkansas was transferred from the Fourth Corps Area to the Seventh Corps Area on 1 December 1920. In October 1940, the War Department implemented a transfer of tactical command functions of the Corps areas, moving tactical forces to field armies and transforming the Corps areas to Service Commands, themselves part of Army Service Forces. The Seventh Corps Area maintained its name until May 1941, when it was officially designated HQ, Seventh Corps Area Service Command (HQ, Seventh CASC) in May 1941. While the Seventh Corps Area no longer existed, the HQ, Seventh CASC – later re-designated HQ, Seventh Service Command – continued until January 1944.

== Establishment ==
The command was established on 20 August 1920 with headquarters at Fort Crook, Nebraska from elements of the previous Central Department. HQ, Seventh Corps Area moved to Fort Omaha, Nebraska, on 27 May 1922 and seven years later moved to the Army Building at 15th and Dodge Streets in Omaha – the Omaha Army Depot – on 25 March 1929.

The Seventh Corps Area Training Center was established in 1921 at Fort Snelling, Minnesota. The training area was responsible for annual summer training of regular army, organized reserves, R.O.T.C. and the C.M.T.C.

== Structure ==
The Seventh Corps Area was responsible for the mobilization, administration, and training of units of the:

- Third and Sixth Armies, including the mobile formations and units in the corps area;
- VII Army Corps (Headquarters St. Louis, 1922–33; Omaha, Nebraska, 1933–40)
  - 7th Division (with its 14th Infantry Brigade active and a designated concentration area at Fort Snelling, MN);
  - 34th Division (allotted to the National Guard of Iowa, Minnesota, South Dakota, and North Dakota, assigned to the VII Army Corps in 1921. HQ, 34th Division was reorganized and federally recognized on 14 July 1924 at Council Bluffs, Iowa. The division had its first opportunity to operate as a whole in the interwar period at Camp Ripley in August 1937);
  - 35th Division;
- XVII Army Corps (88th Division, 89th Division, 102d Division (Arkansas and Missouri)). The corps was constituted in the Organized Reserve on 1 October 1933, allotted to the Seventh Corps Area, and assigned to the Fourth Army. [The] "new corps’ designated HQ location for organization purposes was Fort Crook, NE. In the event of mobilization, it was to be organized with regular army officers and Reserve personnel from the Seventh Corps Area. The designated mobilization station was Camp Pike, AR, where the corps HQ would assume command and control of its subordinate corps troops, which would then be mobilizing throughout the Seventh Corps Area."
- General Headquarters Reserve units;
- and Seventh Corps Area Support Command Zone of the Interior support units.

The 1st Observation Squadron joined the Corps Area on 15 June 1937, transferred from the Sixth Corps Area. It took up station at Fort Omaha, Kansas. However the squadron was reassigned to the Cavalry School around 1939.

From 1927-32, the 6th Cavalry Brigade was part of the corps area.

XVII Army Corps was never activated and was only a designation on paper. It was disbanded 5 September 1945.

== Division areas ==
For the administration of units of the Organized Reserve, Seventh Corps Area was originally organized into three division areas (88th, 89th, and 102d) and all divisional units, except cavalry, were administered by the headquarters of those three divisions. Cavalry units were administered by the 66th Cavalry Division, and nondivisional units were administered by the Corps Area headquarters. On 27 January 1923, the HQ, Non-Divisional Group was established at the Army Building in Omaha to administer corps-level and army-level units. But eight months later, HQ, Non-Division Group was discontinued, on 21 August 1925, and the Corps Area HQ took back responsibility for the remainder of the corps-level and army-level units. Two months later, the HQ, Artillery Group, was established 19 October 1925 at Sioux City, Iowa. The Artillery Group controlled only the corps- and army-level coast and field artillery units, while the Corps Area headquarters retained responsibility for the remainder of the corps- and army-level units. The Artillery Group was discontinued on 1 October 1937. On 2 November 1937, the Seventh Corps Area was divided into three “military areas,” and they assumed control of the artillery units within their zones of responsibility. The First Military Area assumed control of the 88th Division area, the Second Military Area assumed control of the 89th Division area, and the Third Military Area assumed control of the 102d Division area.

The Seventh Corps Area was assigning Reserve personnel to CASC units by December 1930 and to “1700” series numbered units on 2 August 1939. Headquarters Seventh Corps Area began functioning as a service command headquarters in October 1940, and was redesignated HQ, Seventh CASC in May 1941. It was further redesignated HQ, Seventh Service Command on 22 July 1942.

Major posts and installations in the corps area included Fort Crook, Nebraska; Fort Des Moines, Iowa; Fort Leavenworth, Kansas, which was established in May 1827, and included the Sherman Field airfield; Fort Lincoln, North Dakota, in Bismarck, ND; Fort Meade, SD, two miles west of Sturgis, SD; Fort Omaha, NE; Fort Riley, Kansas, which included the Marshall Field airfield; Plattsmouth Rifle Range, NE, eight miles southeast of Fort Crook, and Fort Robinson, near Crawford, Nebraska.

"General Livesay returned to the United States with the 91st Division and remained with that organization until its deactivation on December 1, 1945. He was then assigned as a member of the Military Education Board, Fort Leavenworth, Kansas. On February 7, 1946 he assumed command of the Seventh Service Command with the headquarters at Omaha, Nebraska. Upon the deactivation of the Seventh Service Command Headquarters in May 1947, General Livesay was ordered to fort Jackson, South Carolina, where he became Commanding General of the Replacement Training Center."

In June 1946 the service commands were dismantled, in the main. However, Headquarters, Seventh Service Command was to remain at Omaha, Nebraska, as an area command under the Commanding General, Fifth Army, with functions and duties as prescribed by him.

In December 1947, Independence Army Airfield, near Independence, Kansas, which had been listed as surplus, was turned over to the District Engineer, Seventh Service Command at Omaha, Nebraska. The District Engineer assumed jurisdiction over the field, pending disposition. Excess buildings and demilitarized equipment were sold or transferred to other bases. Some were torn down and sales were held for scrap lumber of torn down buildings, fence posts, barbed wire and other items which no longer had a useful need. The War Assets Administration eventually turned the air base over to local government officials.

== Commanders ==
Seventh Corps Area

- Major General Omar Bundy 1 September 1920–11 February 1922
- Major General Francis J. Kernan 28 May 1922–15 September 1922
- Major General George B. Duncan 16 September 1922–10 October 1925
- Major General Benjamin A. Poore 15 October 1925–1 June 1927
- Major General Harry A. Smith 6 June 1927–21 May 1929
- Brigadier General Edward L. King 21 May 1929–11 July 1929
- Brigadier General Stuart Heintzelman 11 July 1929–26 August 1929
- Major General Johnson Hagood 26 August 1929–2 October 1933
- Major General Frank R. McCoy 3 October 1933–1 February 1935
- Major General Stuart Heintzelman 1 February 1935–6 July 1935
- Major General Frank C. Bolles 30 July 1935–30 September 1936
- Brigadier General Charles M. Bundel 30 September 1936–4 October 1936
- Major General Stanley H. Ford 4 October 1936–31 October 1938
- Brigadier General Guy V. Henry 1 November 1938–8 January 1939
- Major General Percy P. Bishop 8 January 1939–8 October 1940
- Major General Robert C. Richardson Jr. 8 October 1940–17 December 1940
- Major General George V. Strong 17 December 1940–20 May 1941

Seventh Corps Area Service Command and Seventh Service Command

- Major General Frederick E. Uhl 20 May 1941–15 January 1944
- Major General Clarence H. Danielson 15 January 1944-1945

== See also ==
- Fu-Go balloon bomb - potential leak of information investigated by Seventh Service Command personnel

== Sources ==
- Clay, Steven E. (2010). US Army Order of Battle 1919–1941, Vol. 1: The Arms: Major Commands and Infantry Organizations (PDF). Fort Leavenworth, Kansas: Combat Studies Institute Press. Archived from the original (PDF) on March 27, 2018.
