= Herington Army Air Field =

Herington Army Airfield
- Part of Second Air Force
- Located near Herington, Kansas
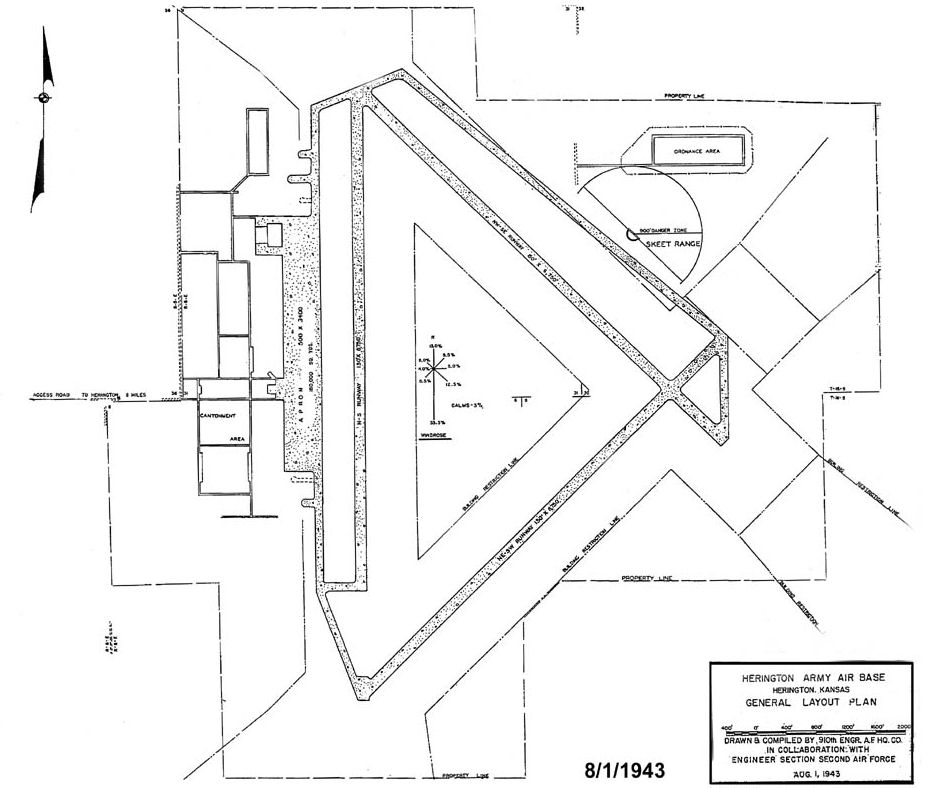
- Herington Army Airfield - 1943 layout plan

Site information
- Type: Staging Airfield

Location
- Coordinates: 38°41′41″N 096°48′29″W

Site history
- Built: 1942
- In use: 1942-1947

Herington Army Airfield was a World War II staging base of the United States Army Air Forces Second Air Force. It is currently the city-owned Herington Regional Airport.

== History ==
Herington Army Air Field was located eight miles from Herington, Kansas, on a 1,700-acre tract of land which had been purchased by the United States government. It was planned as a satellite of Topeka Army Airfield, a Second Air Force installation which was situated some 70 miles to the northeast and which served as the headquarters for the 21st Bombardment Wing.

Construction of Herington Army Air Field, accomplished by contract under supervision of the Air Service Command, commenced in September 1942, and continued over a period of 14 months. Three runways were built with a dimension of 150 x 6750 feet, with a gross load capacity of 74,000 pounds, wheel load of 37,000 pounds. Runways and apron (500 x 4,750 feet) were constructed with a ten-inch gravel base placed in layers on a six-inch compacted earth subbase, and surfaced with one and one-half-inch asphalt cement; the service strip (80 feet wide) was a six-inch concrete slab, thickened to nine inches at the expansion and construction joints. three taxiways, 50 feet wide, completed the runway system. Fronting on the field, three squadron hangars, 120 by 80 feet, were built.

Construction work of a general nature relative to the site chosen for the army air field near Herington, included a water storage and distribution system; a sewage collection and disposal plant; an electric distribution system; two gasoline storage and distribution systems; 128,000 square yards of paved roads and streets; 14,000 square yards of paved walks; and a swimming pool. The station contained about 100 buildings, electric transmission lines, and all the other things one could expect to find in a town of 2,500 people.

=== Units ===
On 1 November 1942, however, Maj. Harold Painter, who was slated to become the first commanding officer, arrived to take over the field. On 26 January 1943, Major Painter formally assumed command of Herington Army Airfield and appointed an adjutant, a provost marshal, a post engineer, a quartermaster(Capt. Arthur J. Sand), and a medical officer. On the same day also the following units were activated:

- 503d Base Headquarters and Air Base Squadron
- 1161st Guard Squadron
- 399th Army Air Forces Band

In the ensuing weeks, a Base Signal Office was created, a Base Operations Section organized, a Finance Department set up, and a Base Chemical Service inaugurated. Commencing with only one officer on 1 November 1942, the number of military personnel on the field grew to 12 officers and 145 enlisted men by 1 March 1943 and to 103 officers and 1,768 enlisted men at the end of the following June. The first contingent of WACs, consisting of one officer and ten enlisted women, arrived one year later. The peak in the strength of the permanent party military personnel was reached in August 1944, with totals of 113 officers and 2,123 enlisted men and women.

=== Deployment staging mission ===
The 21st Bombardment Wing was charged with the responsibility of the final processing of heavy bombardment crews and equipment just prior to their leaving for overseas assignments. To carry out that program the wing utilized Topeka Army Airfield, and three satellite fields (Herington AAF, Bruning AAF, and Fairmont AAF) in Kansas and Nebraska.

This processing of heavy bombardment crews and equipment, sometimes called staging and also preparation for overseas movements, proved to be the principal function of Herington Army Airfield. A preliminary step leading to the development of the program there was the assignment on 25 January 1943 of the 47th, the 48th, the 49th, and the 50th Airdrome Squadrons.

On 17 February following, the 6th Heavy Bombardment Processing Headquarters was activated at Herington. The dominant role played by the processing function is indicated by the fact that in January 1944 the commanding officer of the 6th Heavy Bombardment Processing Headquarters, assumed command over the entire field. That move in effect consolidated three units which existed there: the Processing Headquarters itself; the 503d Base Headquarters and Air Base Squadron; and the 406th Sub-Depot, jurisdiction over which the Second Air Force but recently had taken over from the Air Service Command. Two months later, the whole was organized as the 274th Army Air Forces Base Unit.

The first combat crews and aircraft arrived at Herington for processing during the latter part of June 1943; and the program immediately got under way. Spread out over a period of approximately five days, the schedule involved the performance of the following functions on all such crews and aircraft which were temporarily assigned to the field:

- Auditing and processing of personnel records, orders, and allied papers of each person, and bringing payments up to date
- A physical fitness examination
- A clothing and equipment inspection
- The issue of certain critical items of equipment
- The assignment of the final type aircraft, and the conduct of specified vital inspection tests thereon
- A prisoner of war lecture
- Communications instructions
- The assignment of crews and aircraft to scheduled overseas projects
- Briefings on routes to be traveled
- Arranging the schedule for departure to the port of embarkation.

For the first 11 months of the active program, Herington was primarily a B-24 Liberator staging field, with a few B-17 Flying Fortress crews and aircraft being assigned there for processing. During the months of June, July, and August 1944, however, it was converted into a B-29 Superfortress staging field. That meant, of course, the processing of very heavy bombardment crews and aircraft just prior to their departure for overseas assignments.

By working around the clock during rush periods, the 274th AAF Base Unit at Herington was able to process an average of nine combat crews a day. Normally, however, the rate of processing was much more moderate. Figures for the year ending 30 June 1944 may be regarded as typical. They reveal that during that interval an average of just over 86 crews and 76 aircraft were processed each month. With some slight diminution this rate was maintained until the end of World War II. On the whole most of the crews involved left Herington with their own aircraft. Some of the others traveled by train to the ports of embarkation. The remainder, along with some few aircraft, were transported to ports of embarkation by the Air Transport Command.

=== Inactivation ===
In May 1945, the Continental Air Forces assumed jurisdiction of Herington AAF from the Second Air Force. On 18 July following Herington Army Airfield and the entire 21st Bombardment Wing were placed under the direct supervision of Headquarters, Continental Air Forces. In September 1945 Herington became an installation of the I Staging Command, with the change in the name of the 21st Wing to that designation. Soon thereafter Headquarters I Staging Command was moved from Topeka Army Airfield to Merced Army Airfield in California. There was no further change in the status of Herington, however, until its inactivation on 14 November 1945. Thereafter jurisdiction over it formally passed from the Continental Air Forces to the Oklahoma City Air Service Technical Command.

The installation then was placed on an inactive status, and a declaration of surplus was prepared. On 18 October 1946 the War Department listed the field as surplus to its needs. After disposal had been made of all remaining property and a final audit had been made, jurisdiction over Herington Army Airfield was transferred to the Army's District Engineer, Seventh Service Command at Omaha, Nebraska who assumed jurisdiction over the field on 19 March 1947, pending disposition.

Excess buildings and demilitarized equipment were sold or transferred to other bases. Some were torn down and sales were held for scrap lumber of torn down buildings, fence posts, barbed wire and other items which no longer had a useful need.

== Current status ==
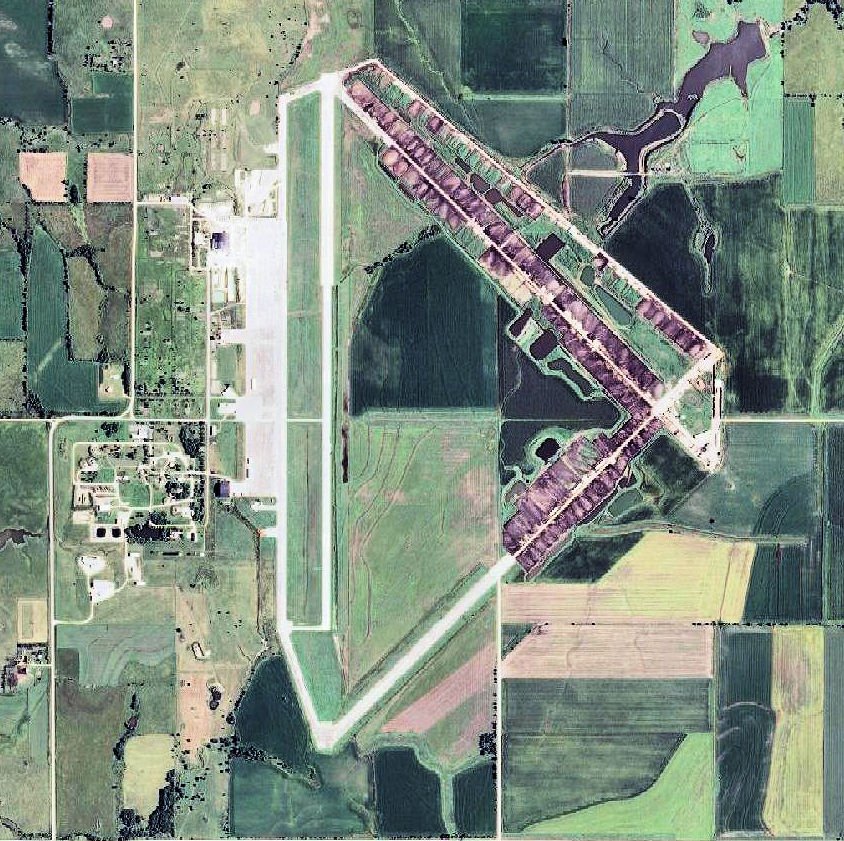
2006 USGS photo of the former Herington Army Airfield

The War Assets Administration eventually turned the air base over to local government officials. Since then the installation has been operated by the city of Herington as its municipal airport.

The airport maintains a small portion of the N/S runway along with a small portion of the parking apron for aircraft use. Otherwise the remainder of the wartime airfield is abandoned. The NW/SE and SW/NE runways have been reduced to a single lane concrete road, with cattle feeding yards to the east and west sides of the road. About half of the N/S runway is abandoned along with the majority of the large aircraft parking apron and associated taxiways. Two of the wartime hangars remain in use, one as part of an open storage yard, the other in a non-aviation use.

Most of the station area is unused with many concrete foundations of the former wartime station buildings evident. A few wartime buildings appear to be standing, although they are in a severe state of disrepair. The station area has some light industrial companies and some wartime streets are evident in photography.

The former wartime airfield can be reached travelling east on U.S. Route 56 from Herington.

== Military staff ==
Chaplains John H. Eastwood and Emil Kapaun were both stationed at Herington Air Base for a period of time.

== See also ==
- Kansas World War II Army Airfields
