= Independence Army Airfield =

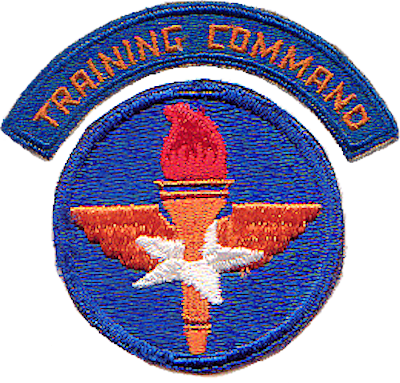
Independence Army Airfield
- Part of Army Air Forces Flying Training Command
- Located near Independence, Kansas
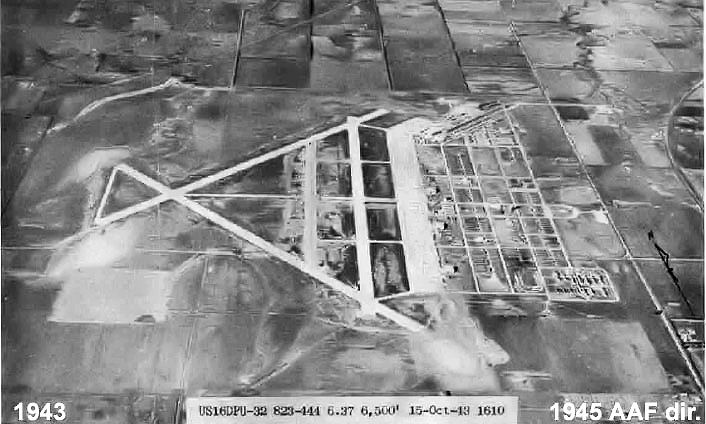
- Independence Army Airfield, 15 Oct 1943

Site information
- Type: Training Airfield

Location
- Coordinates: 37°09′30″N 95°46′42″W

Site history
- Built: 1942
- In use: 1942–1947

Independence Army Airfield was a training base of the United States Army Air Forces from 1942 to 1945. It was part of the Central Flying Training Command (CFTC). It is currently the city-owned Independence Municipal Airport.

== History ==
In January 1941 the Independence Chamber of Commerce, resolved to sell the citizens of the Kansas community the idea of a municipal airport. On 26 June 1941, after six months of effective "selling", the city commission decided to ask the voters to approve a $100,000 bond issue for financing work on the airport. The citizens approved by a vote of 1,219 to 173 on 1 August 1941. A short time later the city commission entered into contract with Paulette and White, consulting engineers from Topeka, to survey potential sites for the field. Several locations were considered before any selection was made. The site chosen was in Montgomery county, six miles southwest of Independence.

Early in 1942 the government indicated it was interested in acquiring the site for a United States Army Air Forces airfield. During April and May civic leaders met with government officials in a series of conferences. Army Engineers made surveys from 8 to 11 April. About six weeks later, on 23 May 1942, the Army officially notified Independence City Government that it would purchase approximately 1,433 acres.

The contract for planning and supervising the construction of the airfield was awarded to Black and Veatch, architectural engineers from Kansas City, Missouri. Work began on 6 June 1942, when Ottinger Brothers of Oklahoma City moved in with a labor crew and began grading operations. Shortly thereafter, work began on the drainage and sewerage systems. During the summer the Missouri Pacific Railroad constructed a spur to the site. In August work began on runways and buildings. Three concrete runways were constructed, aligned 5500x150(N/S), 5500x150(NE/SW), 5500x150(NW/SW). Each runway had a ten-inch gravel base placed in layers on a six-inch compacted earth subbase, and surfaced with one and one-half-inch asphalt cement; the service strip (80 feet wide) was a six-inch concrete slab, thickened to nine inches at the expansion and construction joints. three taxiways, 50 feet wide, completed the runway system. Fronting on the field, three squadron hangars, 120 by 80 feet, were built with a parking apron a mile long and 450 feet wide.

During the fall of 1942 clearing and grading operations began at four locations that had been selected for auxiliary fields. The four sites were located 8 to 20 miles from the main field. The auxiliaries were located at:

- Mound City Army Air Force Auxiliary Field #3 37°07′38″N 96°20′53″W
- Elk City Army Air Force Auxiliary Field #4 37°18′27″N 95°51′04″W
- Independence Army Air Force Auxiliary Field #7 37°11′19″N 95°52′46″W
- Cherryvale Army Air Force Auxiliary Field #9 37°19′59″N 95°30′28″W

Work progressed satisfactorily throughout the winter despite interruptions caused by heavy rains and sub-zero temperatures. By January 1943 three concrete runways 5,000 feet in length had been constructed. Electric, gas and water lines also had been completed and sufficient troop housing was available. Most of the buildings were Theater of Operations construction while some were of the Mobilization type. The Mobilization type buildings included the station hospital, theater, chapel, and Link training buildings. Where before there had been only open farm land, this new city now contained about 200 buildings, with pot-bellied coal stoves for heating. The major construction work, which cost more than $8,000,000, ended in May 1943.

=== Basic Flying School ===
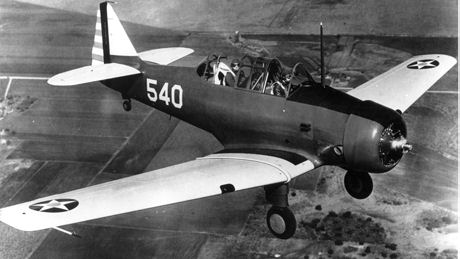
North American BT-14 trainer

Independence Army Airfield was activated as a Basic Flying School on 12 October 1942, under the 32d Flying Training Wing (Basic), Perrin Field, Texas. However, the personnel to operate the base did not begin arriving until December 1942.

Basic flying training began when 152 cadets arrived for the first class on 26 January 1943. The trainer used at Independence AAF was the North American BT-14, with some Vultee BT-13 Valiants as well. Some of the classes that arrived later had as many as 345 students. The cadets, who had completed primary flying training, received a nine-week course that was divided into flying training and classroom instruction. Flight training consisted of several subjects that included, takeoffs and landings, aerobatics, cross-country navigation, and night flying. Ground school involved navigation, meteorology, radio communications, and aircraft recognition. Normally ground school was given between flying lessons. Sometimes it was done in the very early AM or after the evening meal.

Typically the day would start with Reveille at 6:15 AM, followed by breakfast at 6:30. Flying would begin at 7:45 AM. If a student was not scheduled to fly he would be in ground school, drill, or involved in required athletics. Sometimes it was necessary to schedule Sunday flying when inclement weather prevented flying during the week. Normal flying periods were one hour, except cross-country flights. Usually cross-country flights took place between Independence and Claremore, Oklahoma, and Neosho, Joplin, and Nevada, Missouri. Others were flown between Independence, Chanute, and Fort Scott, Kansas.

In May 1944, flying training ended at nearby Coffeyville Army Airfield, and students in training who had not yet graduated were moved to Independence. Most were in Basic flying training, but some advanced twin-engine Cessna UC-78 Bobcats were also flown up from Coffeyville along with some AT-6 Texans. Basic flying training at Independence continued until January 1945. Nineteen classes, totaling 4,933 students, graduated from the school. The last class completed training on 29 January 1945.

=== Aircraft storage base ===
The termination of flying training at Independence resulted in the reassignment of personnel and equipment. Flying personnel were reassigned to airfields in Kansas and Texas during February and March. The BT-13's and BT-14's were moved to airfields in Georgia, Oklahoma, and Missouri. On 15 March Independence Army Airfield was placed on a standby basis.

On 11 April 1945, however, the Army announced that the airfield would be used to store aircraft not needed in the war effort as a Class II storage depot. This classification was for aircraft being placed in an operational reserve state that could be flown out within 7 days. Jurisdiction was transferred to Air Technical Service Command, and during the next two months civilian employment on the field jumped from 44 to 505 and military personnel increased from 2 to 272. Aircraft began arriving on 13 April 1945. At first, bomber aircraft (B-17 Flying Fortress; B-24 Liberator heavy bombers and B-25 Mitchell medium bombers) were prepared for storage and kept at Independence. These were primarily older training aircraft used in the United States.

With the war ended in October 1945, however, all of the B-24 and B-17 aircraft were re-classified as class IV (surplus) and moved to Kingman AAF, Arizona for recycling. At the same time P-47 Thunderbolts and AT-6 Texan trainers began arriving for long-term Type C extended storage. During a period of two and a half years the aircraft stored at Independence included 1,542 P-47's, 1,118 AT-6's, 72 B-25's, 401 B-24's, and 260 B-17's.

=== Closure ===
In the fall of 1947 Air Technical Service Command consolidated its storage depots and all of the stored aircraft were moved from Independence to RFC Walnut Ridge, Arkansas for sale or recycling. Military personnel were transferred to other bases effective 11 December 1947.

Four days later Independence Army Airfield, which had been listed as surplus, was turned over to the Army's District Engineer, Seventh Service Command at Omaha, Nebraska who assumed jurisdiction over the field, pending disposition. Excess buildings and demilitarized equipment were sold or transferred to other bases. Some were torn down and sales were held for scrap lumber of torn down buildings, fence posts, barbed wire and other items which no longer had a useful need.

== Current status ==
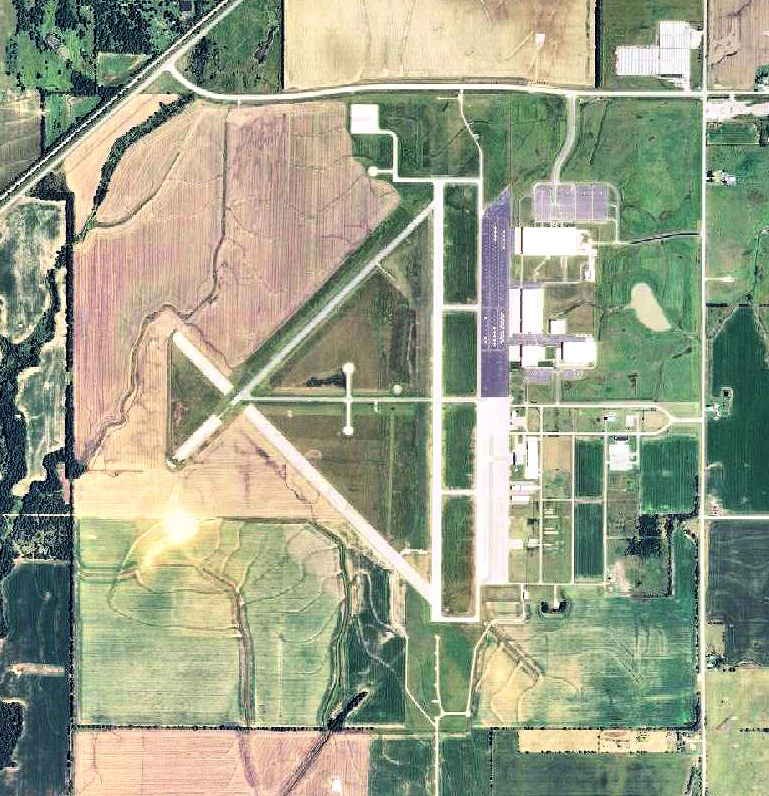
2006 USGS airphoto of the former Independence Army Airfield

The War Assets Administration eventually turned the air base over to local government officials. Since then the installation has been operated by the city of Independence as its municipal airport.

The SW/NE runway is used today by the airport, and the main E/W taxiway. About half of the parking apron is maintained and used by Cessna Aircraft, where the facility assembles, paints, installs the interior and delivers several of the single engine piston models produced by Cessna: the 172 Skyhawk, the 182 Skylane and the 206 Stationair. The plant also produces the Citation Mustang. The Independence facility consists of five buildings on campus: the main assembly plant, the sand and fill building, the paint facility, the Flight building and the new Customer Center. The remainder of the former airfield runways and taxiways remain, although unused.

The ground station consists of streets remaining along with the outline of the base parade ground and headquarters. The Independence Airport Industrial Park consists of companies which have built new structures on it, but generally it is unused and vacant.

== See also ==
- Kansas World War II army airfields
- 32nd Flying Training Wing (World War II)
