= Marshall Army Airfield =

Marshall Army Airfield Marshall Air Force Base
- Part of Fort Riley
- Located near Fort Riley, Kansas
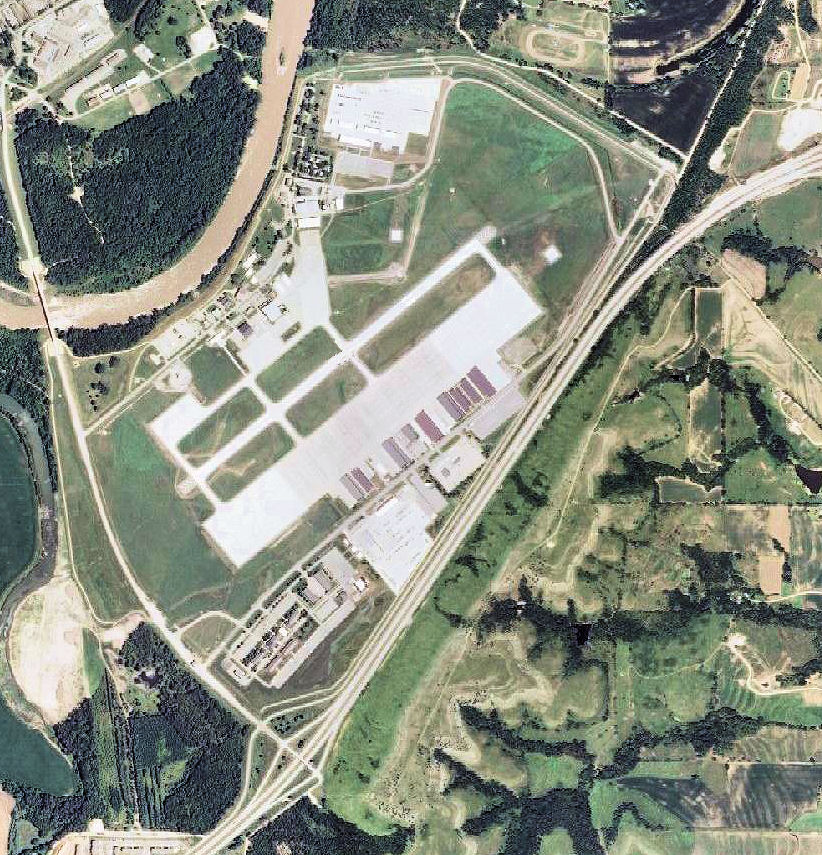
- Marshall Army Airfield

Site information
- Type: Military/civil airfield
- Owner: United States Army

Location
- Coordinates: 39°03′09″N 096°45′52″W

Site history
- Built: 1912
- In use: 1912–present

Airfield information
- IATA: FRI; ICAO: KFRI

Summary
- Airport type: Military
- Operator: United States Army
- Elevation AMSL: 1,066 ft (325 m)
- Coordinates: 39°03′09″N 096°45′52″W

Map
- Location of Marshall Army Airfield

Runways
Direction	Length		Surface
Direction	ft	m	Surface
4/22	4,503	1,373	Concrete

Marshall Army Airfield (MAAF) (IATA: FRI, ICAO: KFRI) is a military airfield located on Fort Riley, Kansas, United States. It was opened in 1921. The primary mission of MAAF is to provide fully integrated fixed base helicopter operations for the Combat Aviation Brigade, 1st Infantry Division.

Airfield operations and services include Base Flight Operations, Control Tower, and Ground Approach Control Facility; USAF weather; Airport Safety; Air Space Management; Flight Simulator; Rapid Refuel Facility; and Crash/Fire/Rescue station. The airfield has an FAA approved instrument approach.

MAAF is the home of the Combat Aviation Brigade, 1st Infantry Division, which currently has approximately 2,200 Soldiers assigned. The brigade currently has Black Hawks, Apaches and Chinooks at Fort Riley — the number fluctuates as aircraft go through maintenance and reset rotations.

The unit is expecting nearly 120 aircraft total, including Kiowas. Co. A, 158th Aviation Regiment (AVIM), and numerous other military and civilian organizations. The airfield also provides CH-47, UH-60 and AH-64 Synthetic Flight Training Systems for all Fort Riley aviation units and specific Army National Guard aviation units.

== History ==
One of the oldest military airfields in the United States, Marshall Army Airfield at Fort Riley made its first appearance in history in November 1912 as the site of the first attempts in the US to direct artillery fire from an airplane. Among the participants was a young lieutenant, Henry H. Arnold, who later became Commanding General of the United States Army Air Forces. Long afterward Arnold recalled the various methods tried for transmitting observations and instructions: a primitive radio, smoke signals, and even colored cards, weighted with iron nuts and dropped through a stovepipe.

The airdrome from which Arnold made his flights was probably the polo field at Fort Riley. How and when the polo field turned into an air base is unknown.

=== Origins ===
In 1921, Colonel Fred Herman selected the Smoky Hill Flats across the Kansas River as the location for a new airfield. The Fort Riley Flying Field opened in August of that year, and was home to the 16th Observation Squadron. The airfield was planned as a refueling point for cross-country flights and was equipped with hangars, underground fuel storage tanks, and lights for night operations. When the facilities were completed in 1923, the airfield was named Marshall Field after Brigadier General Francis C. Marshall, the Assistant Chief of Cavalry, who had died in a plane crash the year before.

In March 1926, Arnold, then a major, returned as air base commander. He held the post for about two and a half years. When he arrived the only flying unit there was still the 16th Observation Squadron. Considerably below strength, it had about eight officers and four or five De Havilland observation planes (DeHavilland DH-4) supplemented by eight or ten Curtiss JN-4 Jennies. Both these planes dated from World War I. A few more modern observation aircraft reached the base, beginning in 1926. The primary responsibility of the fliers at Marshall was to provide demonstrations and participate in training exercises for the United States Army Cavalry School at Fort Riley. At Arnold's initiative a regular air indoctrination course was set up for the cavalrymen. The 16th Observation Squadron also had to furnish aircraft to work with ground units all over the Seventh Corps Area, which stretched from Arkansas to North Dakota, and for such special assignments as flying President Calvin Coolidge's mail from North Platte to Rapid City, South Dakota while he was vacationing in the Black Hills in 1927.

Marshall Field did not change much in size or mission during the 1930s. In March 1931, the 16th Observation Squadron was subdivided into several flights, of which only Flight D was stationed at Marshall. However, it occasionally had company, because from 1930 to 1933 the 35th Division Aviation, National Guard, St. Louis, Missouri, was using the field as a training center for its summer encampments. In June 1937, Flight D was absorbed into the 1st Observation Squadron, which fulfilled the traditional responsibilities of flying units at Marshall until 28 December 1941 when it moved to New Orleans for shipment to the Canal Zone as part of the Panama Canal defense forces of Caribbean Air Force.

=== World War II ===
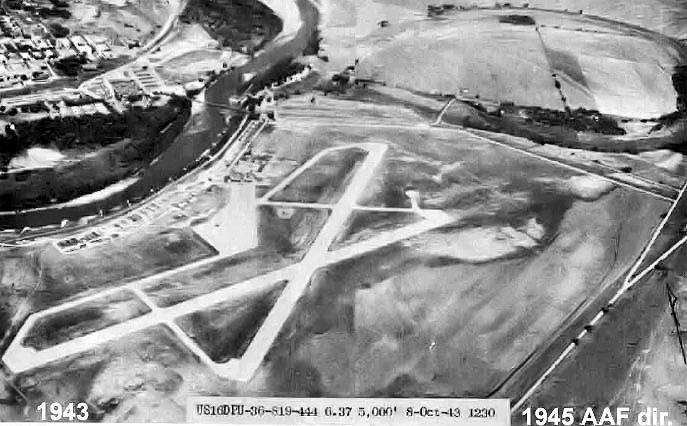
Marshall Army Airfield 8 Oct 1943

When the United States entered World War II Marshall possessed two hangars and three unsurfaced landing strips, the biggest strip being 3,700 feet long. These installations were about a mile south-east of Fort Riley proper and three and a half miles from Junction City, Kansas.

During the war the old strips had to be surfaced and lengthened to take increased traffic and heavier, faster planes. Two concrete runways, each 4,500 feet long and 150 feet wide, six taxiways and 5,400 square yards of parking apron were laid down to meet the new needs.

A base detachment activated in January 1941 to operate the field was designated in January 1942 as the 305th Air Base Squadron (Reduced), but in June it was renamed the 305th Base Headquarters and Air Base Squadron (Reduced). The field was placed under the United States Army Air Forces Third Air Force control and was designated as Marshall Field Army Airfield. However, Marshall remained a relatively small base; its primary mission to support Army ground forces training using Observation and Liaison aircraft. The 305th ABS was disbanded on 1 March 1944 and in June the 356th AAF Base Unit was activated to run the base. At the beginning of that year the work of housekeeping and administration was being done by nine officers and 80 enlisted men.

After the departure of the 1st Observation Squadron from Fort Riley, the 6th Observation Squadron (Special) was activated at Fort Sill, Oklahoma, on 7 February 1942 to take its place at the Cavalry School. The squadron moved to Marshall Field on 21 April 1942 with 15 liaison planes. In June 1943 the squadron was redesignated 6th Reconnaissance Squadron (Special), and on 12 October of that year its name was changed to 2d Composite Squadron (Special). It well deserved the term "composite" for by that time it had acquired 15 P-39 Airacobra fighters and five B-25 Mitchell medium bombers as well as liaison planes and was flying all sorts of tactical air missions.

Besides photographic work, observation, and artillery adjustment, its pilots flew air-ground support demonstrations and simulated strafing, bombing and chemical warfare missions. They "destroyed enemy headquarters" with flour bombs, and sprayed troops with molasses residue in lieu of mustard gas. Members of a Colombian military mission said of one air-ground demonstration that it was "worth going to Fort Riley for that alone." Much work was done away from Fort Riley. Teams from Marshall were scheduled to provide the United States Army Armor School at Fort Benning, Georgia, and the Field Artillery School at Fort Sill, Oklahoma, with six demonstrations apiece in 1944, and they answered many special requests for demonstrations and tests. On 1 August 1945 the airmen at Marshall put on a giant air show in which they displayed to the general public the tactical skills they had acquired during the war.

Several units besides the 2d Composite Squadron spent some time at Marshall during the war. The 72d Observation Group had its headquarters squadron there briefly in December 1941; the 5th Observation Squadron was there from August 1942 till April 1943; and a Black unit, the 1018th Guard Squadron trained at Marshall for a short time in 1945. Also, a detachment of the 161st Liaison Squadron with L-5 Sentinel aircraft visited the base for exercises in November and December 1944. The Army ground forces at Riley in 1944 had 36 aerial target planes which were serviced by the 356th Base Unit.

Marshall was much used as a convenient stop on cross-country flights. Of some 1,400 landings and take-offs at the field in July 1945, 614 were transients. Another and not inconsiderable activity was the flying in and out of distinguished visitors to Fort Riley. Among them were Generals Ben Lear, Joseph W. Stilwell, George S. Patton, and John C. H. Lee. Lee was born and raised in Junction City and returned to visit his family in September 1945 on his post-war tour of the US.

=== Postwar era ===
On 7 November 1945 the 2d Composite Squadron was inactivated, its place being taken by Detachment "B" of the 69th Reconnaissance Group which inherited some of its personnel and equipment. About the same time the 72d and 167th Liaison Squadrons, equipped with 75 L-5s, arrived at the base for training. At the end of the year there were 106 aircraft at Marshall. However, this strength was soon reduced as the postwar demobilization progressed.

Early in 1946 the detachment of the 69th Group was withdrawn and the 72d Squadron was reduced to a two-man cadre, so that by late April only the 167th Squadron remained. On 3 October 1946 it was inactivated and the 163d Liaison Squadron was created to replace it.

Late in 1946 the Army Cavalry School and the Cavalry Intelligence School at Fort Riley were inactivated and the Ground General School was established there. The principal mission of the 163d Squadron continued to be the giving of air support to the new school as to the old, but it confined its efforts mainly to visual reconnaissance. At first it used only L-5s, but in the spring of 1947 it acquired six helicopters, the novelty of which aroused much interest in subsequent demonstrations. That spring the squadron was also given control of detachments at Biggs Army Airfield, Texas; Alamogordo Army Airfield, New Mexico, and Camp Beale, California. These detachments, with a half-dozen liaison planes, were working with the rocket development center at White Sands, New Mexico.

With the establishment of the United States Air Force in September 1947, the name of Marshall was changed to Marshall Air Force Base. with the Air Force placing Marshall AFB under Continental Air Command. The Air Force decision in 1948 to eliminate all enlisted pilots by the end of the year caused a drastic shake-up at Marshall AFB. Though they were almost extinct in most USAF flying units, the 163d had twenty-five enlisted pilots and only nine commissioned pilots in 1947.

Undoubtedly the most dramatic episode of the postwar period at Marshall AFB came early in 1949 when the base contributed its facilities, planes, and helicopters to "Operation Haylift", bringing relief to snowbound areas in several Western states. Another memorable event was the emergency landing on 6 August 1948 of a B-29 Superfortress which had made a record-breaking 5,120-mile non-stop flight from Fürstenfeldbruck Air Base, Germany.

On 1 April 1949, the 163d Liaison Squadron was inactivated. Light aviation detachments of the Ground General School and the 10th Infantry Division took over most of its functions. However, in September 1949, Tenth Air Force established an Instrument Training Center at Marshall AFB to provide a refresher course for all its pilots outside of the 56th Fighter Wing. The school had eight instructors and was equipped with ten B-25 Mitchell bombers modified as TB-25 training aircraft, which were later replaced by Beechcraft C-45 Expeditors.

In March 1950, after 86 pilots had graduated, the school was moved to Selfridge Air Force Base, Michigan. The Air Force then withdrew entirely from Marshall and, effective 1 June 1950, the base unit, which on 23 August 1948 had become the 4406th Air Base Squadron, was inactivated, and jurisdiction of Marshall was transferred to the United States Army as Marshall Army Airfield.

=== Cold War ===
Thanks to conflict-driven innovations in flight and cargo hauling operations, helicopters assumed a much larger peacetime Army role after the Korean War. Fort Riley was an early beneficiary of the helicopter's increased importance in post-Korea U.S. Army air missions, becoming home to the 5th Army's first helicopter training facility.

Air Force operations at Marshall ended in late 1953, and on 19 November 1953, the first three Sikorsky H-19D helicopters purchased by the Army arrived fresh from the factory to be used in training at Marshall AAF. The 98th Transportation Army Aircraft Repair Detachment at Fort Riley was the only unit of its type in the Fifth Army area in 1954, and serviced all of the planes for the region. Working largely in the hangars at Marshall Field, the unit worked primarily on engines, instruments, and rigging.

Around the same time, the 328th Helicopter Transportation Company transferred overseas, and the 21st Transportation Helicopter Battalion was activated at Marshall Field. The first unit of its kind in the Army, the battalion's mission was to "activate, supply, and supervise training of helicopter companies to prepare them as combat ready units for assignment overseas or with units in the United States." Advancements in military aircraft and airborne combat tactics kept the units at Marshall Field supplied with new machines, new units, and new training courses.

By March 1955, the 71st Helicopter Transportation Battalion was training pilots in the operation of twin rotor helicopters, first the Piasecki H-25A, then the larger Piasecki H-21C. The emphasis on helicopters did not result in neglect for fixed-wing aircraft at Fort Riley. The post was selected as the home of the 14th Army Aviation Company in June 1955. Activated as a Fixed-Wing Tactical Transport unit, it was the first of its type and flew the 14-seat de Havilland U-1 Otter.

Big news arrived on 21 July 1955, with receipt of a directive to activate the first Army Aviation Unit Training Command (AAUTC) at Fort Riley. The creation of the AAUTC was the result of the rapid expansion in Army aviation units in the mid-1950s. Seeking to utilize existing resources, the Department of the Army established two AAUTCs in 1955: one at Fort Riley and one at Fort Sill. The 71st Transportation Battalion was assigned the training mission on 24 January, and the AAUTC became operational on 18 February, making it the first of its kind in the Army.

== See also ==
- Kansas World War II Army Airfields
