= Percy Poe Bishop =

United States Army general

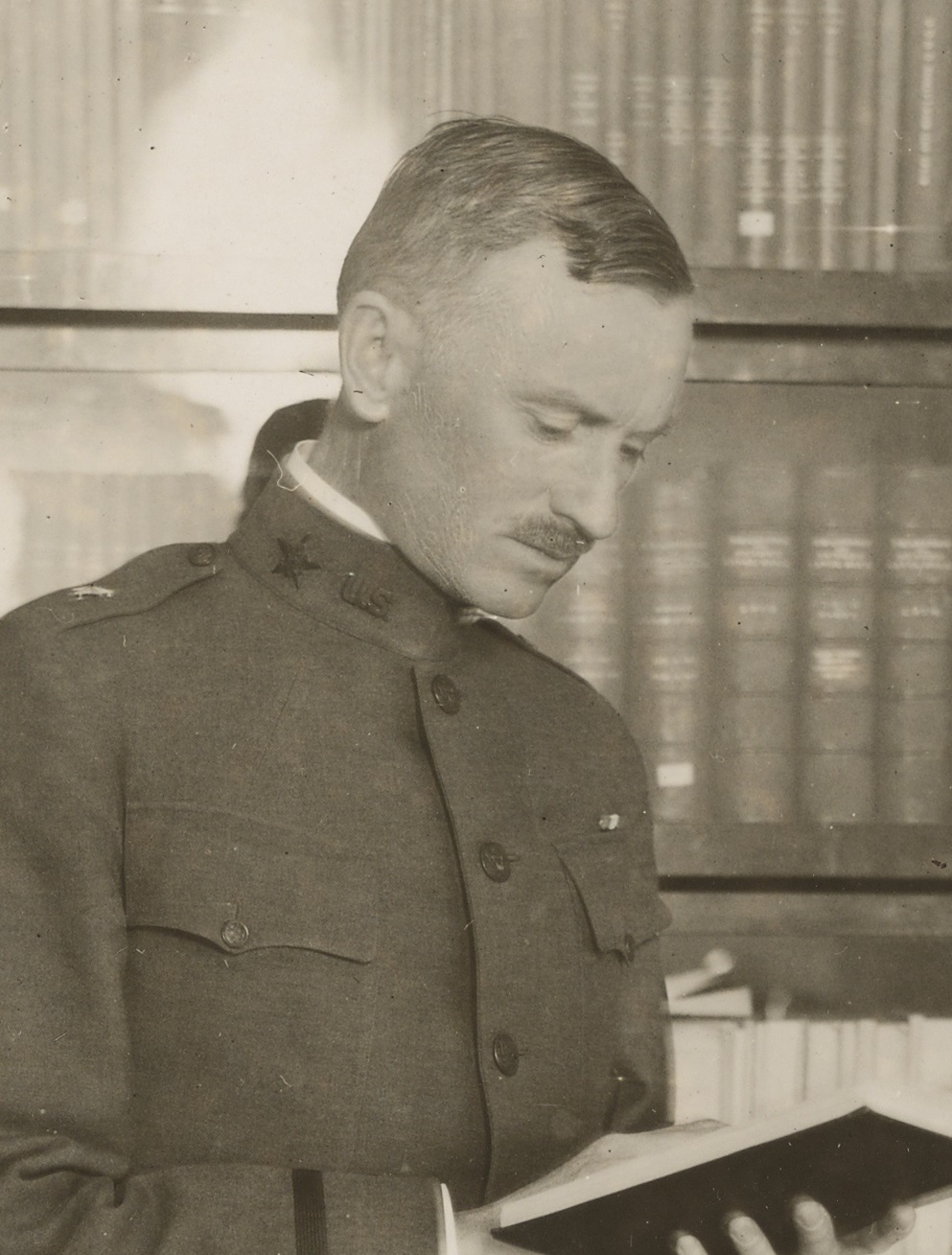
- Brigadier General Percy P. Bishop in 1919
- Born: May 27, 1877; Powell, Tennessee
- Died: April 8, 1967 (aged 89); Andrews Air Force Base, Maryland
- Burial place: Arlington National Cemetery, Arlington, Virginia
- Military career
- Allegiance: United States
- Branch: United States Army
- Service years: 1898–1941
- Rank: Major General
- Service number: 0-655
- Unit: United States Army Coast Artillery Corps
- Commands: Seventh Corps Area
- Conflicts: Spanish–American War; World War I
- Awards: Army Distinguished Service Medal

Percy Poe Bishop (May 27, 1877 – April 8, 1967) was an American major general active during World War I.

== Early life ==
Bishop was born in Powell, Tennessee. In 1898, he graduated from the University of Tennessee with a B.S. and was commissioned a second lieutenant in the 4th Field Artillery Regiment on July 9 of that year.

== Career ==
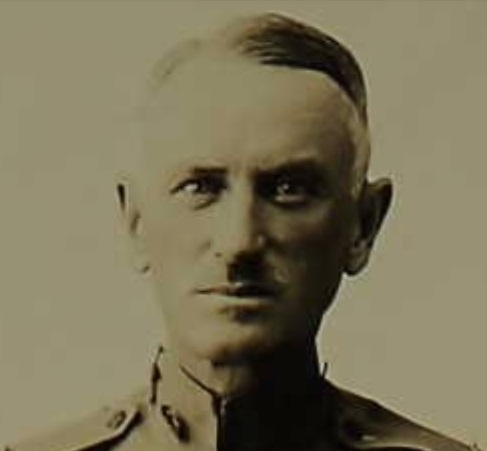
Closeup of Bishop's 1923 passport photo.

He was an honor graduate of the Artillery School in 1902 and an instructor there through 1903. He served as assistant to the Chief of Coast Artillery from 1907 to 1911. From 1914 to 1917, Bishop was assistant to the Chief of Coast Artillery, and was transferred to the General Staff Corps on October 16, 1917, when he became assistant to the secretary of the General Staff. On February 6, 1918, he was promoted to colonel. On March 21, 1918, he became secretary of the General staff. He was promoted to brigadier general on October 1, 1918, and held the rank until November 1, 1919, when he reverted to his peacetime rank. From September 1918 to October 1921, he was chief of the Personnel Branch of the General Staff. In 1926, he graduated from the Army War College. He became a brigadier general in 1934 and a major general in 1938. Bishop retired in 1941.

He belonged to both the Army and Navy Club, the Chevy Chase Club, and the Omaha Club.

== Awards ==
Bishop was awarded the Distinguished Service Medal for his performance of duty as secretary of the General Staff. The citation for his medal reads:

The President of the United States of America, authorized by Act of Congress, July 9, 1918, takes pleasure in presenting the Army Distinguished Service Medal to Brigadier General Percy Poe Bishop, United States Army, for exceptionally meritorious and distinguished services to the Government of the United States, in a duty of great responsibility during World War I, as Secretary of the General Staff and in the organization and coordination of matters relating to the commissioned personnel of the Army.

== Death and legacy ==
Percy Poe Bishop died at the age of eighty-nine on April 8, 1967.
