= Coffeyville Army Air Field =

Former airfield in Montgomery County, Kansas

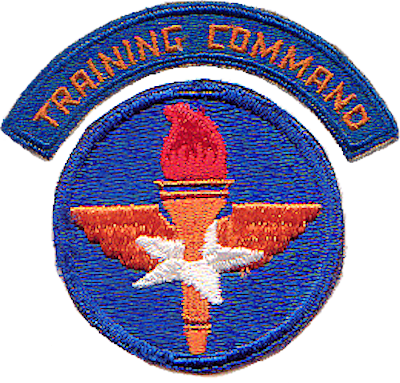
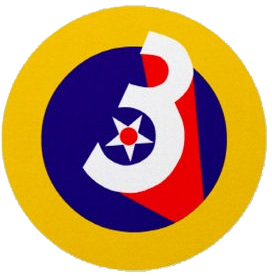
Coffeyville Army Airfield
- Part of Army Air Forces Flying Training Command; Third Air Force
- Located near Coffeyville, Kansas
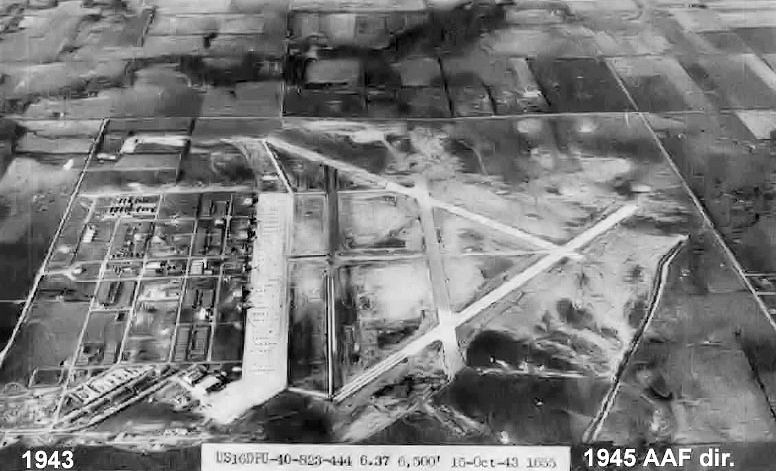
- Coffeyville Army Airfield KS 10 Oct 1943

Site information
- Type: Training Airfield

Location
- Coordinates: 37°05′39″N 095°34′19″W

Site history
- Built: 1942
- In use: 1942–1946

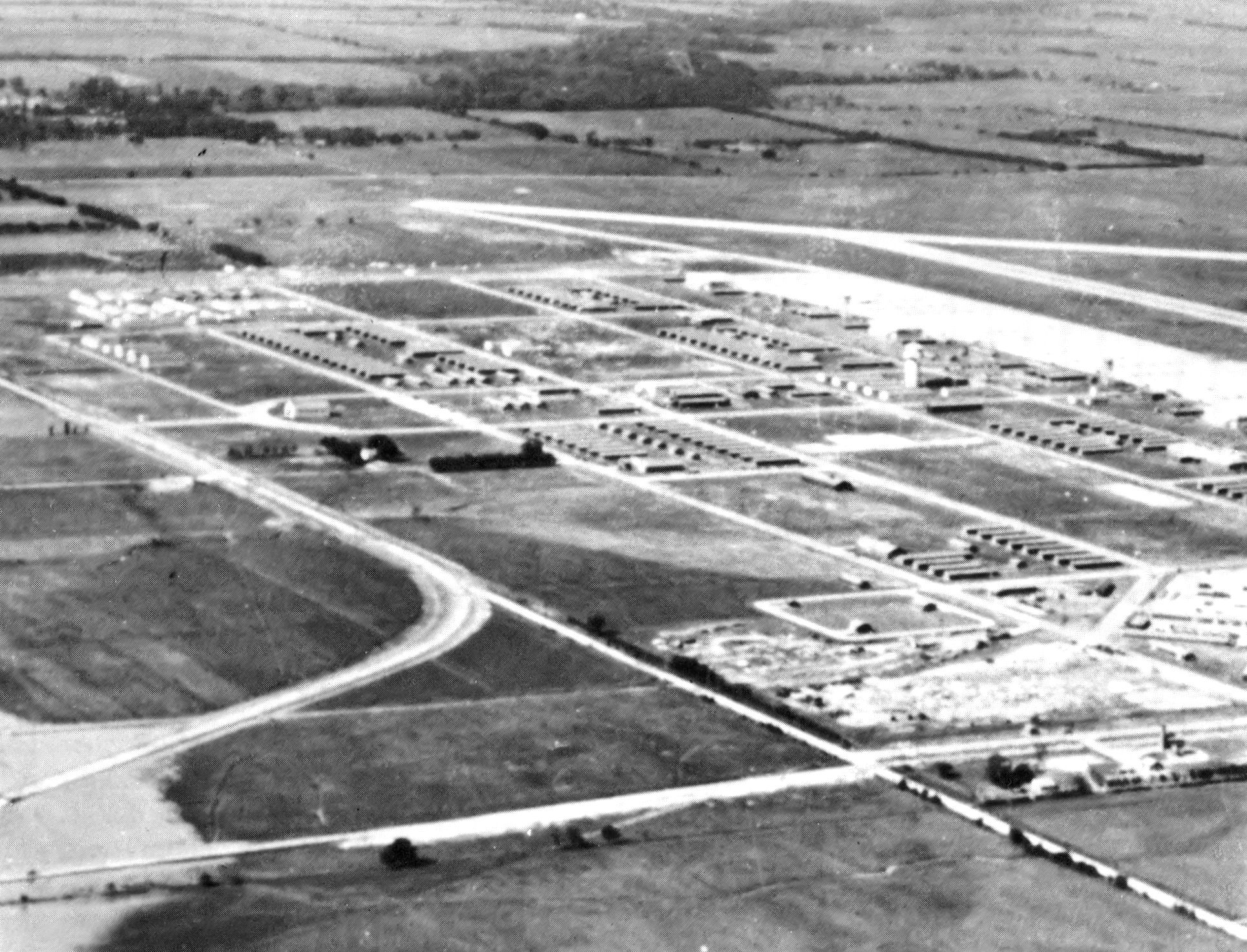
Station area, 1945

Coffeyville Army Airfield was a World War II training base of the United States Army Air Forces Central Flying Training Command (CFTC). It was later used by Third Air Force. Today, it is the city-owned Coffeyville Municipal Airport, Kansas.

== History ==
Early in 1942, the War Department decided to build a basic training field outside the town of Coffeyville, Kansas, one of eleven Army Air Forces bases the state would have before the end of World War II.

The base was eagerly sought after by the town's community leaders. Many businessmen donated time and part of their expenses to get the base approved. Their efforts started in late 1941, with several visits by key city officials in Washington to talk with different agencies of the War Department. By Thanksgiving 1941, the Chamber of Commerce and the Airport Committee, received a commitment from the War Department for a site engineer to consider Coffeyville.

The decision was made to build the base on 8 May 1942. The site was located seven miles north-east of Coffeyville, on a 1,456-acre tract of land which had been purchased by the United States government. Construction, which was accomplished by contract under the supervision of the U. S. District Engineers, Tulsa, Oklahoma, commenced on 1 June 1942. It had really started before when the county began to improve the road network around the new base to handle the increased truck traffic hauling construction material to the site. The weather didn't cooperate, as the latter part of 1942 was very wet, slowing construction; however, most of the construction was accomplished over the next eight months.

When finished, the "Army Air Forces Basic Flying School. Coffeyville Kansas" had four runways, each 150 feet wide. The shortest was 5,872 feet. Most of the buildings were Theater of Operations construction while some were of the Mobilization type. The Mobilization type buildings included the station hospital, theater, chapel, and Link training buildings. There were three hangars with a parking apron a mile long and 450 feet wide were constructed. 'Where before there had been only open farm land, this new city now contained 212 buildings, a water storage and distribution system, sewage system and treatment plant, electric transmission lines, a railway spur, and all the other things one could expect to find in a town of 5,000 people. Its effect upon the city of Coffeyville was dramatic.

The base was the first of its type to be established in Kansas and would graduate the state's first class of cadets. In addition to the main base and airfield, there were four auxiliary fields also constructed for emergency and training use in the area along with the use of Coffeyville Municipal Airport

- Angola Army Auxiliary Airfield #1, comprising 206 acres, approximately 6.2 air miles to the southeast. 37°01′54″N 095°30′00″W
- Edna Army Auxiliary Airfield #2, with 241 acres, about 14.25 air miles almost due east 37°04′34″N 095°19′12″W
- Edna Army Auxiliary Airfield #3, with 633 acres, 12.5 air miles to the northeast. Auxiliary No. 3 was the only one with a regular concrete runway system. 37°07′38″N 095°20′53″W
- Mound Valley Auxiliary Airfield #4 37°11′19″N 095°27′28″W
- Coffeyville Municipal Airport, comprising 241 acres, just over nine miles slightly east of north. 37°04′00″N 095°38′30″W

It was normal for a new base, built under extreme time pressure, to have start up problems. Coffeyville was no exception. There was no running water, and no roads. Coffeyville AAF wasn't ready for personnel. The base housing facilities were not ready. Some men were living under a baseball stadium at Forest Park, a recreation area in the city of Coffeyville. Meals were also served there for a time before the base mess hall opened.

The sewage system was not completed, and the water wasn't fit to drink because the pipes had not been cleaned. All drinking and cooking water had to be hauled from the city of Coffeyville in a street sprinkler. The electricity had been turned on and off intermittently during September, and came back on in the mess hall around 6 PM just as the troop train was backing into the siding. Due to a problem with the natural gas service, the first meal served at the base was barbecued wieners, instead of the originally planned roast beef. Dinner was about half finished when a cloudburst started. From then until January, 1943, the place was a sea of mud.

Many jobs needed to be finished before the cadets arrived. At the time, there was no water tower, so for fire protection, a fire truck was rented from the city of Coffeyville, and crewed by a driver and firefighter hired from the city. The post refrigeration units were not complete, meats and other perishables were stored in the Coffeyville Ice and Cold Storage company until facilities at the field were ready. Runways were not completed, nor were any of the maintenance buildings or shops in the sub-depot area. Most of the major construction would not be completed until January 1943.

Additionally, much remained to be built, i.e., taxiways, fencing, a crash station, a cadet operations building, some streets, and a civilian mess hall, etc. The fourth runway was started in July, later in August, the rebuilding of the original runways with concrete began.

=== Assigned units ===
The new base was placed under the jurisdiction of the 32d Flying Training Wing (Basic), Perrin Army Airfield, Texas. During July 1942 detachments of the following units were organized at Coffeyville:

- 908th Quartermaster Company, Aviation (Service)
- 852d Ordnance Company, Aviation (Service)
- 778th Chemical Service Company (Aviation)
- A Finance Department

Early in September following detachments of two other units, the 1038th Guard Squadron and the 857th Signal Service Company, Aviation, were organized. These were followed before the end of the year by medical and veterinary detachments and by the 23d Airways Communications Squadron

The first large number of base support personnel, about 600 men, came to the field by train, arriving on 18 September Coming for the most part from Enid Army Airfield, Oklahoma. The bulk of the original military personnel arrived at Coffeyville during October and November 1942. They included troops of the 366th Base Headquarters and Air Base Squadron, the 317th Army Air Forces Band, and the 820th, 821st, 822d, and 823d School Squadrons. From a total of 63 officers and 190 enlisted men on 1 October 1942 the permanent party strength increased to 283 officers and 2,369 enlisted men by 1 February 1943.

=== Basic Flying School ===
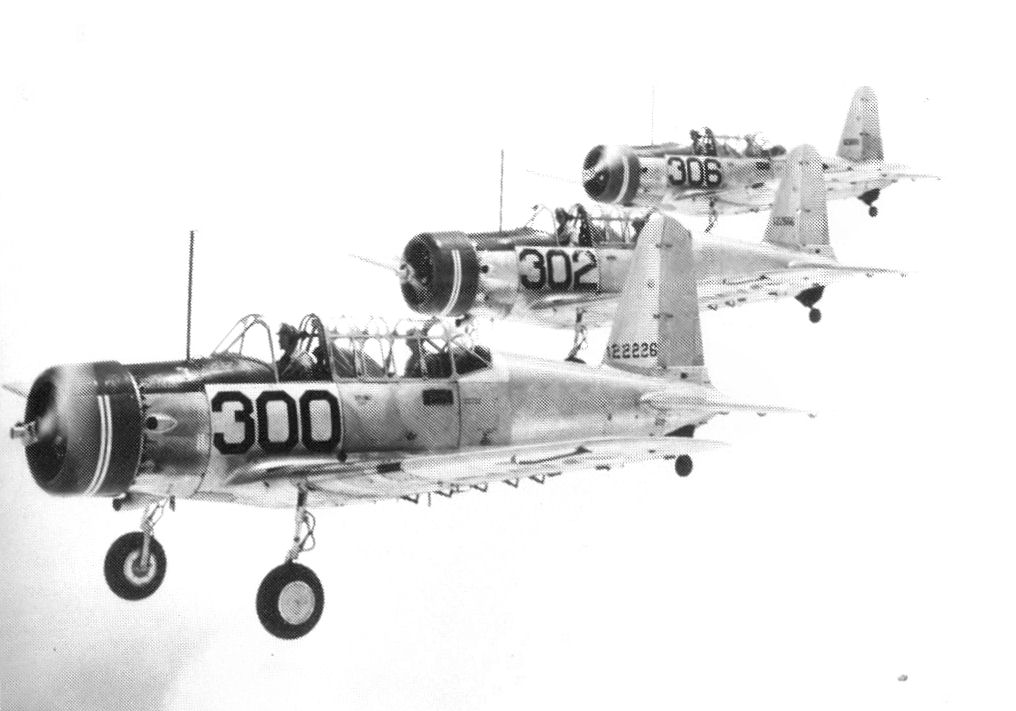
Formation of Vultee B-13 Valiants from Coffeyville AAF, 1944

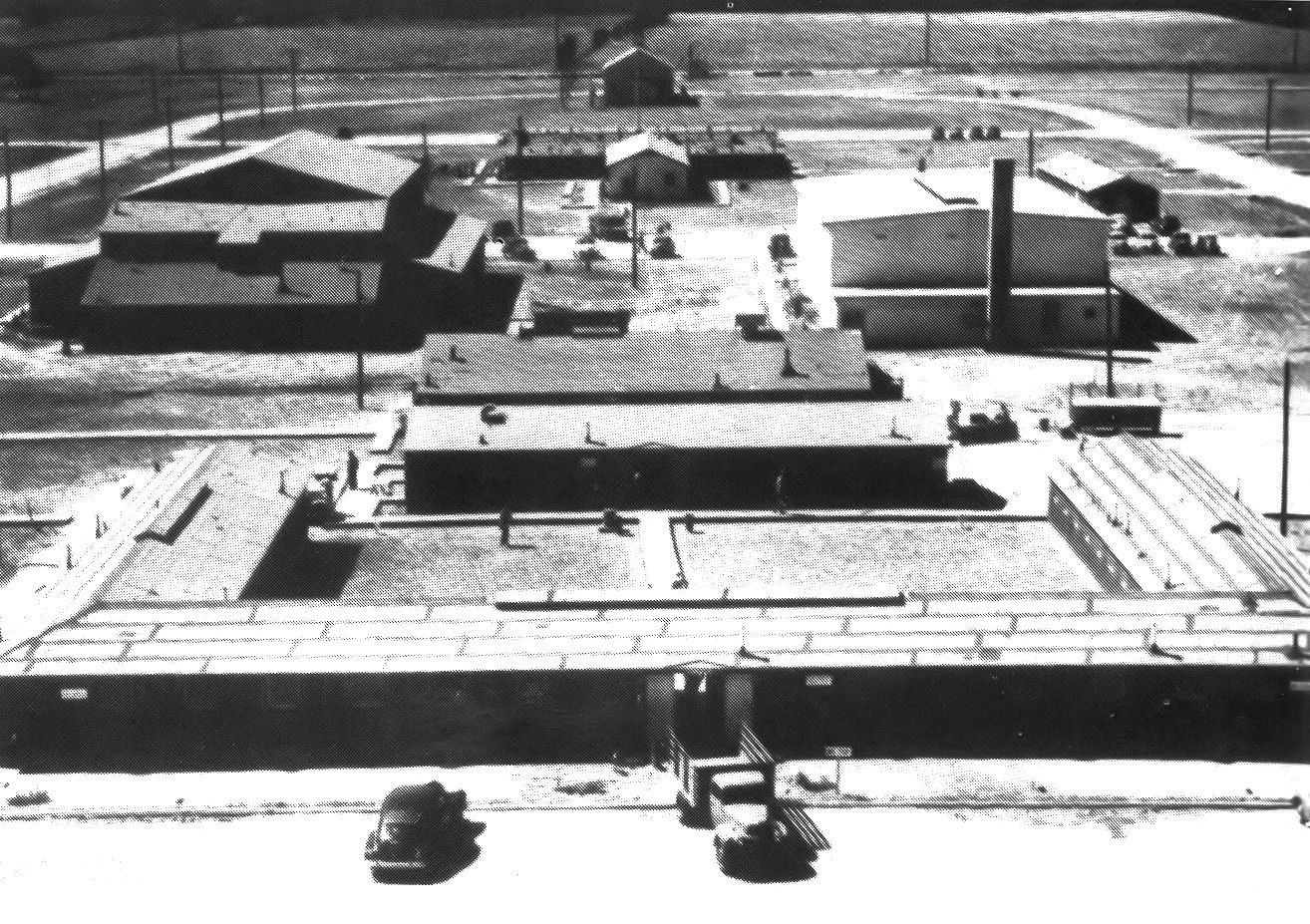
Photo of PX (front), Rec Center (left), Movie Theater (right)

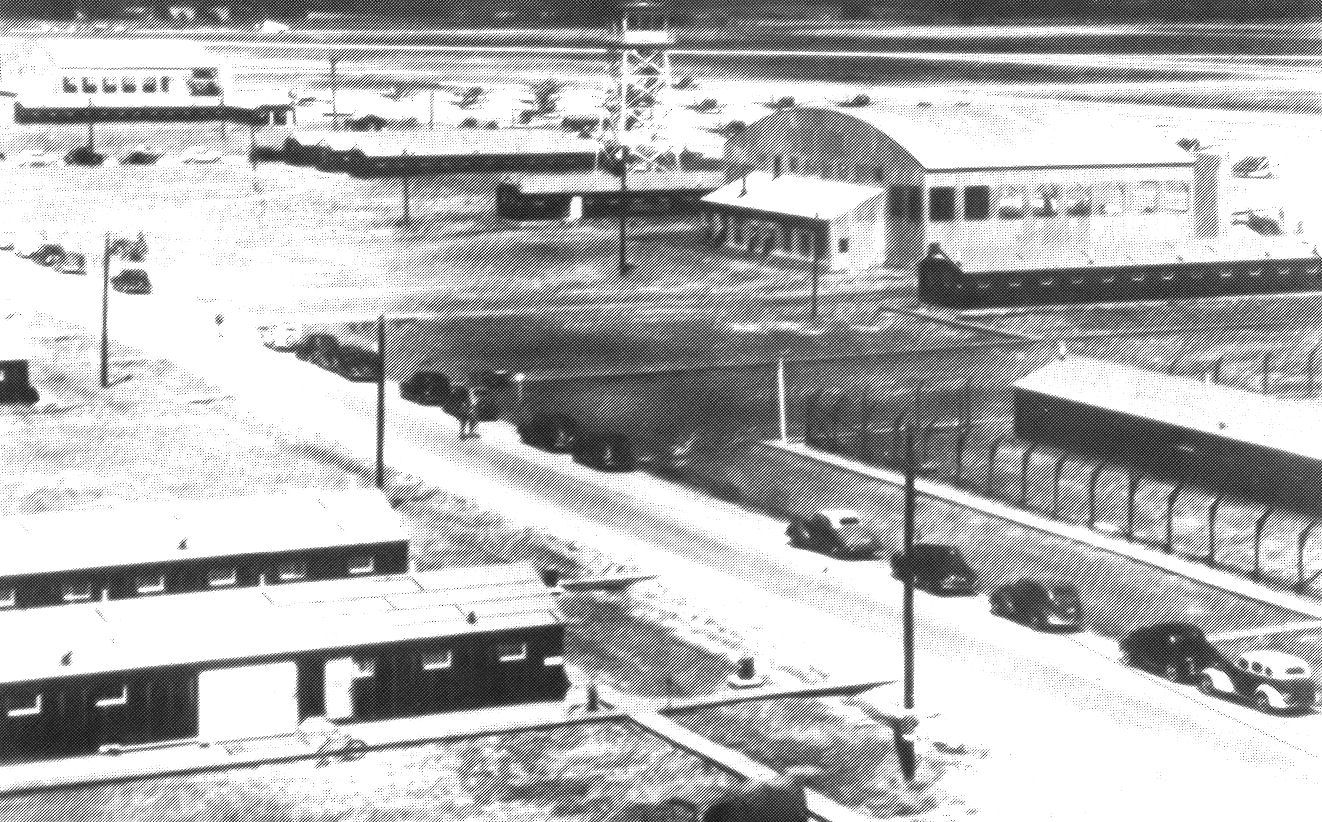
Stockade (right), Hangars, Control Tower, some BT-13s on the apron

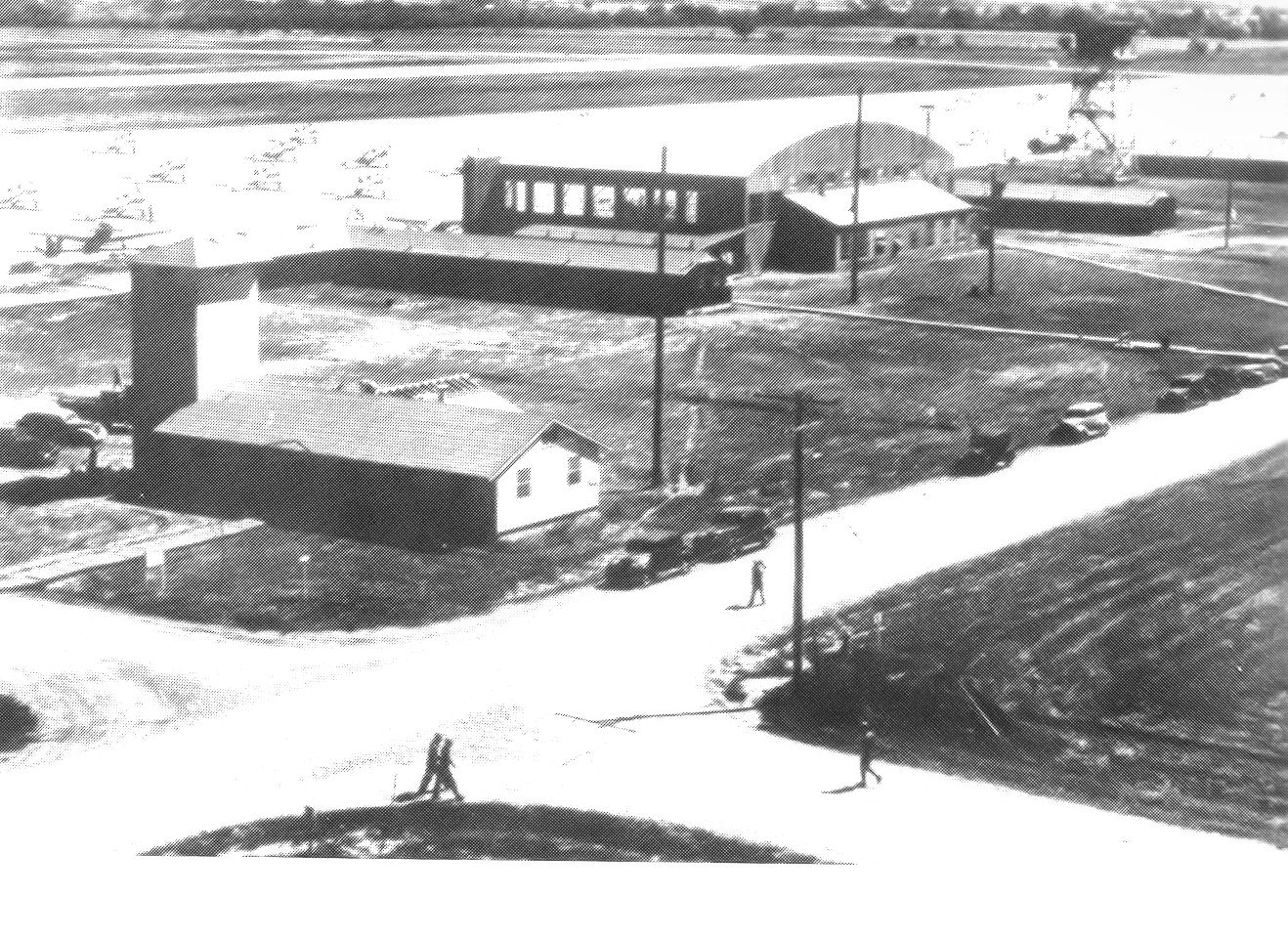
Parachute shop (front), flight line and parking ramp

The mission originally assigned to Coffeyville was the basic, or second-stage, training of aviation cadets. Hence the designation, Army Air Forces Basic Flying School, when it was activated on 17 June 1942.

As of 1 January 1943 it was re-designated the Coffeyville Army Air Field, although the mission was unchanged. From 6 August 1943 until 31 May 1944 the flying training unit at the field was known as Army Air Forces Pilot School (Basic). The training of cadets at Coffeyville actually began on 14 November 1942 with Class 43-C with 137 members from primary flying schools at Hatbox Field, Muskogee, Oklahoma. 116 graduated at the end of the course on 13 January 1943. Meanwhile, the second class, 43-D, with 156 cadets had begun training in December 1942. It completed the course, with 129 individuals graduating on 15 February 1943.

This was about six months from the start of construction, and as was typical with most of the training bases, training began while the field was being completed. Training started on 14 November. While in basic flying school the student pilot learned to fly a more advanced aircraft than he soloed in primary flight training. At the time, Basic was a ten-week course consisting of 70 hours flying, 94 hours in ground school, and 47 hours in military training. At the end of the basic training, the student moved on to advanced flight training at another base

The trainer used at Coffeyville AAF was the Consolidated-Vultee BT-13 Valiant. Coffeyville received its first BT-13s on 8 November, just eight days before the start of flight training. Since construction of the maintenance hangars was still in progress, maintenance was done outside on the parking ramp. To make matters more interesting, the sub-depot supply warehouses weren't finished, so parts were kept, and the sub depot operated in the City of Coffeyville at the Ford dealership. At first, maintenance personnel had to make their own desks, tables, and work benches. Important maintenance equipment and aircraft parts were not available, so occasionally aircraft were cannibalized to keep the remainder flying. Maintenance went on day and night. Like flight training, maintenance procedures and organization were consistently reviewed and improved. Eventually, a base mechanics school was established. This along with the other improvements, led to about 96 percent of all aircraft being available for training by June 1943.

Early, only broad course objectives, requirements, and directives were received from higher headquarters. As time went by, these directives became more specific. As a result, the flight training program at Coffeyville continually changed. Additionally, training was hindered by lack of equipment, facilities, and trained personnel. Instrument training provides a good example of the continual evolution of training at Coffeyville At first, all instructors gave their students the appropriate instrument training. Later, this phase of training was delegated to a few instructors who specialized in this phase of the cadets training. During the winter of 1943 and 1944, all instructors took additional training and became qualified to teach instrument flying. So, the centralized training for instruments was stopped. Many felt this was a positive move, because the student could stay with the same instructor throughout his training at Coffeyville Later as directives became more specific, some instructors would complain about the lack of flexibility. Students were now required to spend a specific amount of time on specified maneuvers. To help with instrument training fifteen Link Trainers were put into operation in mid-December 1942 with Class 43-C. The course of instruction was 15 hours. One problem with the Link instructors was, they were trained at twelve different fields and so taught the course twelve different ways. Additionally, supplies were hard to get, and the training buildings were not suited for the task. A new building was built specifically for Link Training. By March 1944, there were thirty-four link trainers.

For a time, there were six training squadrons at the field, eventually this settled down to three, they were the 822nd, 823rd, and the 825th. Sometimes it was necessary to schedule Sunday flying when inclement weather prevented flying during the week. Normal flying periods were one hour, except cross-country flights. Usually cross-country flights took place between Coffeyville and Claremore, Oklahoma, and Neosho, Joplin, and Nevada, Missouri. Others were flown between Coffeyville, Chanute, and Fort Scott, Kansas.

Flight training consisted of several subjects that included, takeoffs and landings, aerobatics, cross-country navigation, and night flying. Ground school involved navigation, meteorology, radio communications, and aircraft recognition. Normally ground school was given between flying lessons. Sometimes it was done in the very early AM or after the evening meal.

Typically the day would start with Reveille at 6:15 AM, followed by breakfast at 6:30. Flying would begin at 7:45 AM. If a student was not scheduled to fly he would be in ground school, drill, or involved in required athletics. By March 1943, the field had three control towers with three radio frequencies to help control student flights.

Life was not all work for the cadets. The first USO dance for enlisted men was held on 4 March 1943. The first formal social function for the cadets was a dance at Memorial Hall in Coffeyville. Also, a cadet club was opened in Coffeyville on West Eighth Street. A wives club was formed and involved itself in many projects, the most important being welfare and Red Cross activities. This included helping the wives settle among strange surroundings, visiting cadets in the hospital, and decorating the cadet recreational buildings. The club met weekly and published a small mimeographed paper. The city of Coffeyville allowed the cadets to use the high school swimming pool, and reserved it for their use during part of the day. In addition, there were USO shows from time to time, and dances attended by invited guests from Coffeyville and surrounding communities. The bowling alley was opened in May 1943 and had six lanes. The field had its own radio show that was arranged and written by the special service staff. Sometimes it broadcast from Coffeyville on radio station KGGF. Golf was also available at reduced rates at Coffeyville's Hillcrest Country Club. The post had a gymnasium and several athletic fields for softball, football, and volleyball. No base was complete without its obstacle course and Coffeyville was no exception.

The last basic flight training class, 44-G, held their graduation dance in Coffeyville's Memorial Auditorium on 20 May 1944. At this point in the war, there was no longer the need for the vast numbers of new pilots being produced by the many training fields, so Coffeyille received notice to close down. From beginning to end, approximately 4,840 cadets and aviation students began the basic flying course, in 16 separate classes, at Coffeyville. In-completions, however, because of physical and flying deficiencies, serious accidents, and resignations were fairly numerous. As a result, only 3,881 successfully completed the course.

=== Third Air Force ===
On 1 June 1944 Coffeyville Army Airfield was transferred to Third Air Force as pilot training was wound down. The field's new mission was to train photo reconnaissance pilots. When it took over the field Third Air Force organized there the Coffeyville Replacement Training Unit (Photo Reconnaissance) which was assigned to Headquarters Reconnaissance Training Wing (Provisional).

Three months later the unit was redesignated the Coffeyville Combat Crew Training Station (Photo Reconnaissance), with some emphasis being placed upon the preparation of photo-reconnaissance pilots for overseas movement. In mid-September it was assigned to the III Tactical Air Command.

The first group of photo reconnaissance pilots reported to Coffeyville for training on 12 June 1944. Other groups followed in rapid succession. Operating at first on a 10-weeks' schedule, the students divided their time, roughly in the ratio of one to four, between ground school studies and flying training. In the beginning there were F-10 Mitchells being used. This was the photo-recon version of the B-25 medium bomber. However, during the latter part of the period the aircraft used generally for this part of the work was the F-5 Lightning, an unarmed photo recon version of the P-38. Commencing in January 1945 the students were required to complete four weeks of special instrument training before taking up their photo reconnaissance work.

Because of limited facilities during the summer of 1945, some classes which had completed the instrument training course at Coffeyville were shipped to Will Rogers Army Airfield, Oklahoma, for the photo-reconnaissance work. During the latter part of July, however, the instrument training program was transferred from Coffeyville to Will Rogers AAF, while the photo reconnaissance section at Will Rogers was transferred to Coffeyville.

During the 12-months' period ending on 4 June 1945 over 460 photo reconnaissance pilots completed all their training requirements at Coffeyville, and were shipped to staging areas for processing and assignment to overseas shipments. In addition, more than 200 pilots received their instrument flying training at Coffeyville, and were shipped to Will Rogers AAF for training as photo reconnaissance pilots. There was no diminution in this indicated rate of training during the few remaining weeks of World War II.

=== Inactivation ===
Finally on Tuesday morning, 2 October 1945, a telegram arrived from the War Department that said, "You are authorized to announce the temporary inactivation of Coffeyville Army Air Field, Coffeyville, Kansas on or about 1 October". All training stopped. The only exception was the completion of training for several Chinese students.

Early in the post-war period Coffeyville Army Air Field was earmarked for eventual inactivation. In a temporary inactive status it was transferred to the Tactical Air Command on 21 March 1946. As soon thereafter as the necessary arrangements could be effected the Tactical Air Command transferred it to the Army's District Engineer, Seventh Service Command at Omaha, Nebraska who assumed jurisdiction over the field on 26 August 1946, pending disposition.

Some buildings were sold and moved into town as temporary housing, one even found use as a bar. Excess supplies were hauled off to other bases, with the excess aviation gas going down the road to the nearby Independence Army Airfield, at Independence, Kansas. Finally on 21 July 1947, the War Assets Administration made a formal presentation of the deed to the City of Coffeyville.

== Current status ==
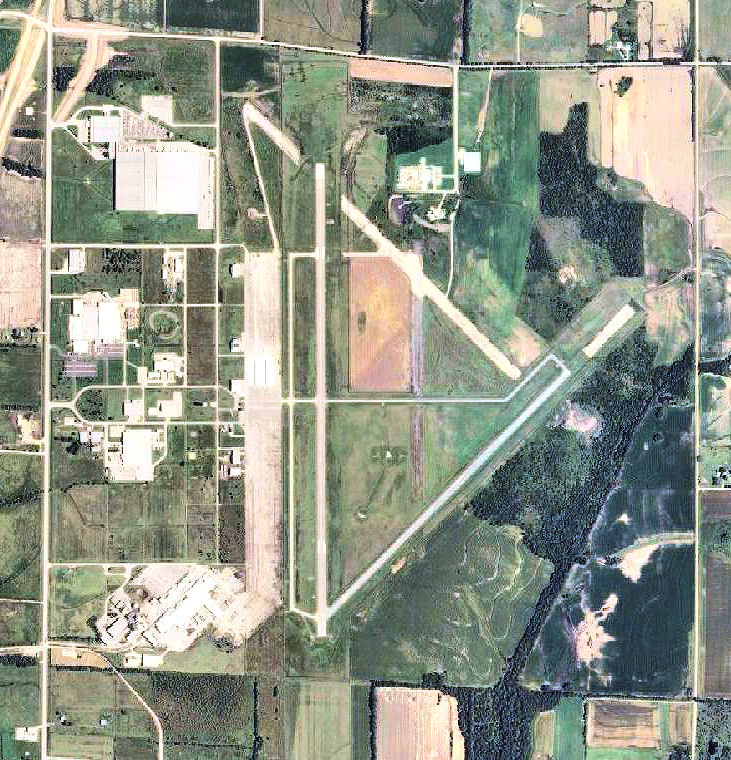
2006 USGS airphoto of the former Coffeyville Army Airfield

Today, Coffeyville's airfield remains in use and is the center of a growing industrial park. Most of the World War II buildings were sold off, torn down, although unlike some former World War II training fields, several original buildings remain in use, including the sub-depot and the three original squadron hangars. Many of the original streets remain.

Two of the three runways are in-use today by Coffeyville Municipal Airport. The terminal building was constructed on the wartime parking apron, although much of the parking apron consists of deteriorating concrete pads in one form or another. The NW/SE runway and the eastern N/S runways are abandoned, with sections of concrete removed.

The airfield can be reached by driving on U.S. Route 169 north from Coffeyville.

== See also ==
- Kansas World War II Army Airfields
- 32d Flying Training Wing (World War II)
