= John H. Eastwood =

- John & Shirley Eastwood, circa 1941
- Born: John H. Eastwood; May 12, 1911; Pawnee County, Nebraska
- Died: February 13, 2007 (aged 95); Munster, Indiana
- Education: B.A. Tarkio College; D.D. Princeton Theological Seminary
- Occupations: Evangelist, Chaplain
- Spouse(s): Shirley Eastwood (m. 1941–2007) (his death)
- Religion: Presbyterian
- Writings: Pastoral Counseling in the Parish Setting; Bees, Sparrows, Old Prince, and The Prince of Peace; The Wonder of Grace
- Offices held: Chaplain, United States Army Air Corps; Pastor
- Title: Doctor

John H. Eastwood (May 12, 1911 – February 13, 2007) was an American author, seminary professor, army chaplain, and church pastor. He grew up in rural Nebraska and earned a Doctor of Divinity from Princeton Theological Seminary in 1941. He served in the United States Army 464th Bombardment Group during World War II, starting at Herington Army Airfield and later in Italy. His final position was as the pastor of Covenant Presbyterian Church in Hammond, Indiana, a church that he led to triple in size during his leadership.

"Our future is made sacred by their sacrifice."--Chaplain John H. Eastwood to the 464th's surviving airmen just after V-E Day 1945

== Airman's prayer ==
Eastwood delivered (and likely wrote) before every mission what became known as the "Airman's Prayer". In 1943, several of these verses were added to the Navy Hymn.

God guard and guide us as we fly
Through the great spaces of the sky;
Be with us as we take to air
In morning light and sunshine fair.
Eternal Father, strong to save,
Give us courage and make us brave;
Protect us whereso'er we go,
From shell and flak and fire and foe.
Most loved member of our crew.
Ride with us up in the blue.
Direct our bombs upon the foe
But shelter those whom Thou dost know.
Keep us together on our way,
Grant our work success today.
Deliver us from hate and sin,
And bring us safely down again.
O God protect us as we fly
Through lonely ways across the sky.

== Bibliography ==
Eastwood published at least four books during his lifetime, all related to Christianity and Christian counseling.

Title	Year	Type	Pages
Pastoral Counseling in the Parish Setting	1981	hardback	236
The Way of Salvation	1990	paperback	39
Bees, Sparrows, Old Prince, and The Prince of Peace	1989	hardback	166
The Wonder of Grace	1995	hardback	172
