= Sherman Army Airfield =

Sherman Army Airfield Sherman Air Force Base
- Located near Fort Leavenworth, Kansas
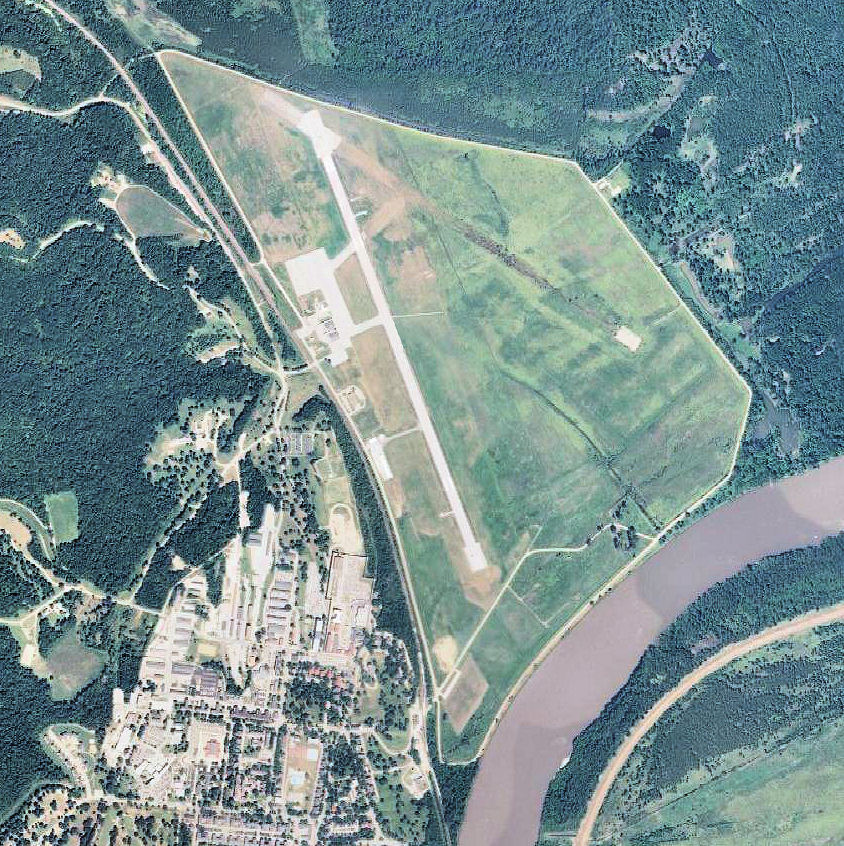
- Sherman Army Airfield, 2006

Site information
- Type: Military/Civil Airfield
- Owner: United States Army

Location
- Coordinates: 39°22′04″N 094°55′04″W

Site history
- Built: 1926; 100 years ago
- In use: 1926–present

Airfield information
- IATA: FLV; ICAO: KFLV; FAA LID: FLV

Summary
- Airport type: Military / public
- Elevation AMSL: 772 ft (235 m)
- Coordinates: 39°22′04″N 094°55′04″W

Map
- Location of Sherman Army Airfield

Runways
Direction	Length		Surface
Direction	ft	m	Surface
16/34	5,318	1,772	Asphalt/concrete

Statistics (2018)
- Aircraft operations: 20,400
- Based aircraft: 31
- Source: Federal Aviation Administration

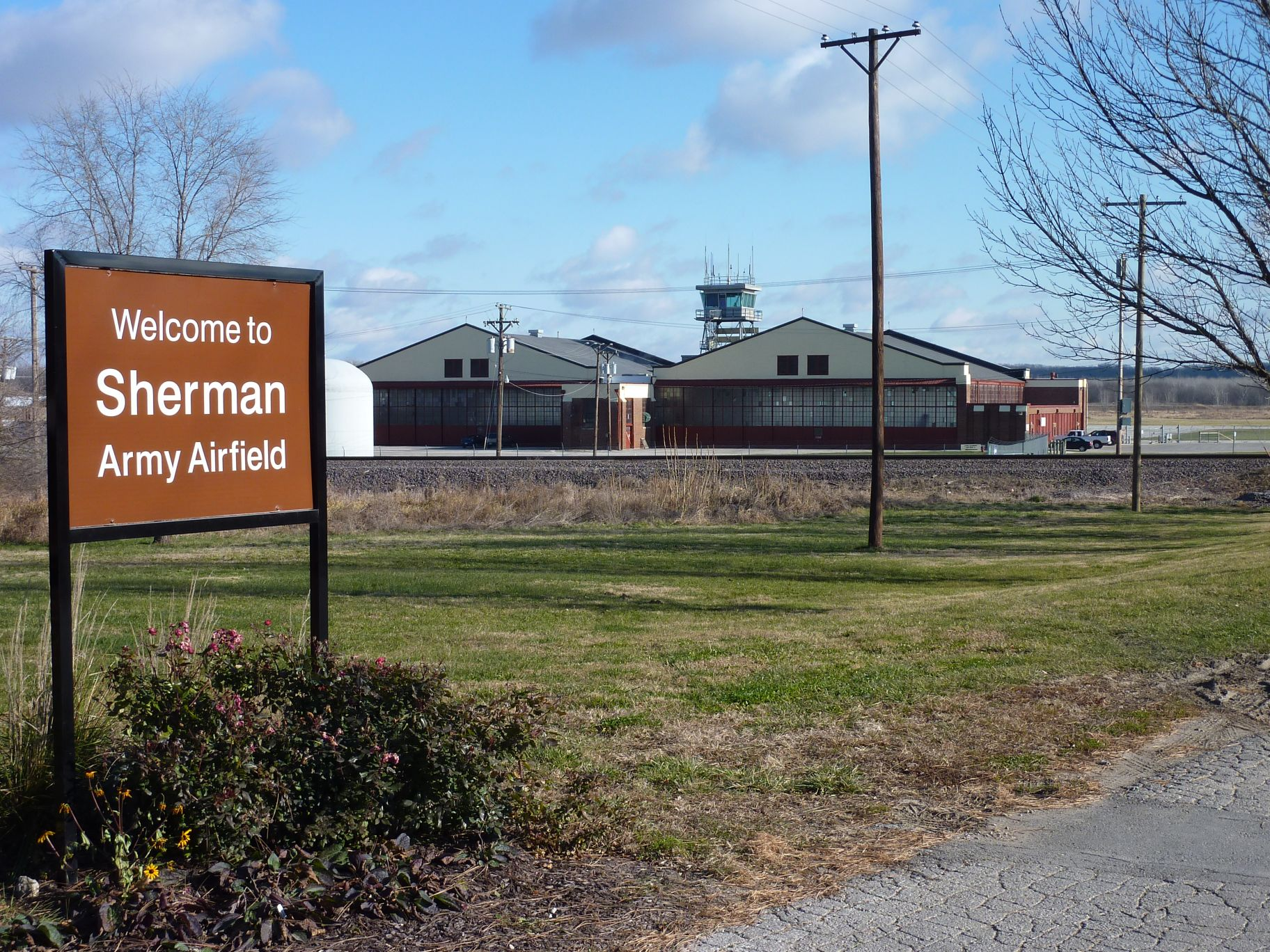
Entrance road

Sherman Army Airfield (IATA: FLV, ICAO: KFLV) is a joint use civilian-military airport located at Fort Leavenworth, Kansas, in Leavenworth County, Kansas. The airport is located on the United States Army post, but the city of Leavenworth, Kansas, has an agreement providing for civilian use at all times without prior notice or permission. Civilian use of the airfield far exceeds military use 93% to 7% as of the end of 2019.

It derives its codes from Fort Leavenworth. While many facilities at Fort Leavenworth are named for the Command and General Staff College founder William Tecumseh Sherman the airfield is actually named for an early Army Aviation pioneer, Major William Carrington Sherman (1888–1927), who died in 1927 at Ft. Leavenworth while there as an instructor. William Sherman wrote the Army's first airplane tactics manual, Air Tactics (1921), as well as several other army airplane manuals and histories.

== Fort Leavenworth Army Flying Activity ==
Fort Leavenworth Army Flying Activity (FLAFA) is the MWR operated aero club at Sherman Army Airfield. It offers aircraft rental, flight instruction, fuel, and hangar rental to military and government employees. Its school provides flight training for the Private Pilot Certificate, Commercial Pilot Certificate, Airline Transport Pilot Certificate, and Flight Instructor Certificate. It has five aircraft available for rental, a Piper Warrior II, and four Cessna 172.

== Leavenworth Aviation Services ==
Leavenworth Aviation Services (LAC) is the sole fixed-base operator (FBO) at Sherman Army Airfield. It offers aircraft maintenance and repair, aircraft rental, flight instruction, fuel, and hangar rental. Its school provides flight training for the Private Pilot Certificate, Commercial Pilot Certificate, Airline Transport Pilot Certificate, and Flight Instructor Certificate. It has three aircraft available for rental, a Piper PA-28 Cherokee, Mooney M20, and a Piper PA-30 Twin Comanche.

== Facilities and aircraft ==
Sherman AAF covers an area of 234 acres (95 ha) at an elevation of 772 feet (235 m) above mean sea level. It is a non-towered airfield with one runway designated 16/34 with an asphalt/concrete surface measuring is 5,318 by 102 feet (1,772 x 30 m).

For the 12-month period ending 31 December 2017 the airport had 20,400 aircraft operations, an average of 55 per day: 94% general aviation and 6% military. At that time there were 31 aircraft based at this airport: 97% single-engine and 3% multi-engine.

== History ==
From its beginning, the primary and almost exclusive function of Sherman Army Airfield at Fort Leavenworth was to provide flying facilities for the Command and General Staff School at Fort Leavenworth. Most of its use was for proficiency flights by pilots assigned to the school as students or instructors

=== Origins ===
In the early 1920s such flying was done at an old polo ground about three miles from Sherman. However, in the spring of 1926 an emergency strip, which had been laid out on the present site in 1923, was converted into a permanent airfield. To run the field an Army Air Corps detachment was stationed there until 1 July 1937 when the detachment became the Third Staff Squadron. The base was located on low ground in a bend of the Missouri River one mile northeast of Fort Leavenworth near the Disciplinary Barracks.

At first a sod surface was used, but in 1930 construction of three cinder runways was initiated. The largest of these had a length of 4,000 feet, and after the entry of the United States into World War II they were further lengthened to 6,000 feet, a distance sufficient for most types of aircraft used in that war. However, because in wet weather or when the river was high the ground was often too sodden to be satisfactory for use by heavy aircraft, cement aprons were laid down late in 1944 at the ends of the main runways. Intersecting at one end and joined by a short cross-strip, the runways made a shape like the letter "A."

A hangar for the base was built in 1932. Badly damaged in 1934 by a fire which also destroyed several planes, it was repaired and used for the next 20 years. Several temporary buildings, including barracks for enlisted men, were added during World War II.

=== World War II ===
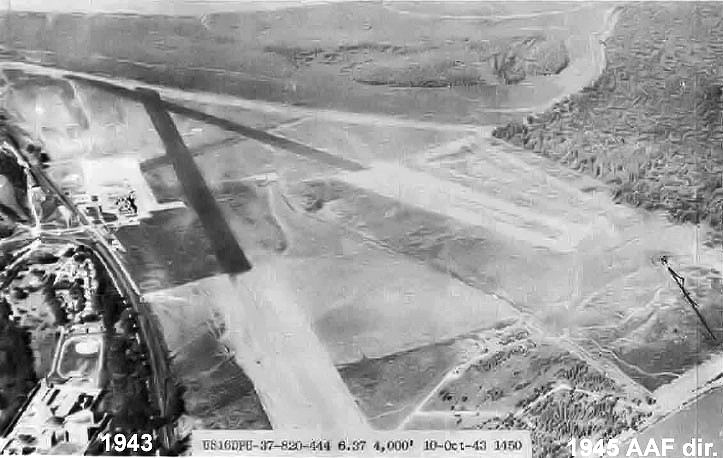
Sherman Army Airfield, 10 October 1943

During much of World War II Sherman had the peculiar distinction of being directly under Headquarters, Army Air Forces. However, on 21 January 1944 it was assigned to Third Air Force under which it remained for the duration of the war. The Third Staff Squadron was inactivated on 29 April 1944, its personnel and equipment going to a new organization, the 355th Air Base Unit. Also disbanded at that time and absorbed into the 355th were a medical detachment and the 344th Sub-Depot, which had been in operation at Sherman since its activation on 1 May 1941. About 50 men belonging to an airways communications detachment and a weather detachment remained outside the base unit, though attached to it for rations and quarters.

Early in the war when bases were scarce Sherman AAF was pressed into service for training purposes. In September and October 1941 two National Guard units, the 124th and 127th Observation Squadrons, were sent there to train. They left in April 1942. Royal Netherlands Air Force cadets were given primary flight instruction there in 1942 by the 671st School Squadron. Otherwise the mission of the base continued to be to provide facilities for proficiency flying by faculty and students at the Command and General Staff School, for administrative flights, and for transients.

As late as May 1944 Sherman had only 25 planes, most of which were trainers and none models then used in combat. However, an influx of pilots sent to study at Fort Leavenworth after gaining extensive combat experience on tours of duty overseas made it desirable to provide more and better planes for their use. A batch of 15, including some P-40 Warhawks, arrived in June 1944, and by the end of the war over 60 aircraft, at least ten of which were P-51 Mustangs, were based at Sherman. Traffic expanded until in July 1945, 868 local and 357 cross-country flights were made from the base.

Over the years Sherman saw many array of visitors, usually drawn there to transact business or attend ceremonies at Fort Leavenworth. Among them were in 1944 Gen. H. H. Arnold, Commanding General of the Army Air Forces, in 1945 Lt. Gen. Lewis H. Brereton, Commanding General of Third Air Force, and in 1946 the Chief of Staff of the United States Army, General of the Army Dwight D. Eisenhower, and the Deputy Commander of the AAF, Lt. Gen. Ira C. Eaker. Later came Gen. Jacob L. Devers, the commander of the Army Ground Forces, Lt. Gen. Curtis E. LeMay, Commanding General of Strategic Air Command, and Lt. Gen. Elwood R. Quesada, head of Tactical Air Command. Of many foreign dignitaries, the British general, Marshal Sir Bernard L. Montgomery, who attended graduation at Fort Leavenworth in 1953, was the most famous, but probably the most stared at was the only Soviet general ever seen in that area, Maj. Gen. Nicolai V. Slavin, who stopped off in 1944 on his way to the Dumbarton Oaks Conference.

=== Postwar era ===
In 1946 Sherman passed from Third Air Force to the newly created Tactical Air Command, under which it remained until the end of 1948 when it was given to Tenth Air Force, a subordinate of Continental Air Command. With the establishment of the United States Air Force in September 1947, the name of Sherman was changed on 13 January 1948 to Sherman Air Force Base. The 355th Base Unit was transformed on 23 August 1948 into the 4405th Air Base Squadron, and this in turn was redesignated as the 2223d Air Base Squadron, effective 16 December 1950.

After World War II operations at Sherman sank again to a small scale. By mid-1947 there were only 13 aircraft at the field and later there were even fewer. On 1 July 1950 only four officers and 104 airmen were assigned to the 4405th Air Base Squadron. However, this low manning was possible only because even after the separation of the Air Force from the Army, Fort Leavenworth continued to provide Sherman with almost all necessary quartermaster, ordnance, engineering and finance facilities. In 1951 the base acquired an additional mission, responsibility for providing minimum flying training for officers at 11 stations, mostly ROTC detachments, in Kansas and neighboring states.

=== Transfer to Army jurisdiction ===
During the summer of 1953 Tenth Air Force evaluated Sherman Air Force Base and came to the conclusion that in the interests of economy the base should be discontinued and its training activities be transferred elsewhere. Headquarters USAF approved this measure, and on 25 October the 2223d Air Base Squadron was officially discontinued. Responsibility for final close-out of the base was entrusted to the 2472d AFROTC Detachment at the Olathe Naval Air Station, Olathe, Kansas. On 1 January 1953, the formal transfer of jurisdiction for the facility was made to the United States Army.

=== Modern era ===
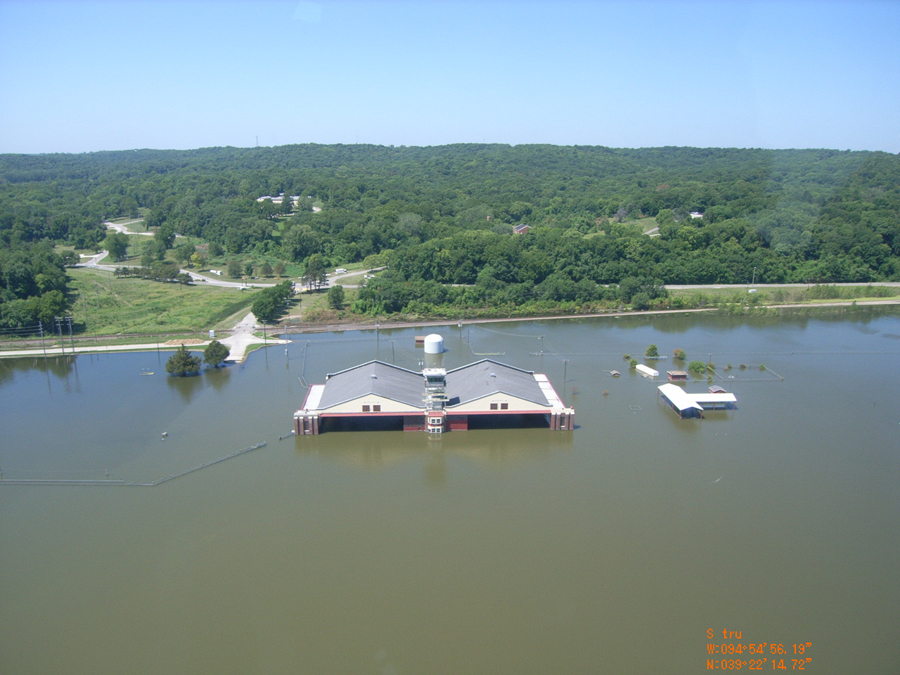
The field on 19 July 2011 during the 2011 Missouri River floods

The airport is at the foot of the Missouri River bluffs that make up the fort. Often endangered by floods, the levee protecting it burst the Great Flood of 1951, Great Flood of 1993, 2011 Missouri River flood, and 2019 Midwestern U.S. floods causing Sherman to be inundated.

In 2002 the United States Disciplinary Barracks relocated from the middle of the fort to the northwest edge of Fort Leavenworth. In 2009 after it was announced that Guantanamo Bay detention camp detainees may be relocated to the Barracks, civilian leaders of the city and county of Leavenworth formally opposed the move because they fear it would mean an end to civilian use of the airport because of increased security.

Sherman airfield is also home to one of the last Army flying clubs in the United States. Fort Leavenworth Army Flying Club and Red Stone Arsenal Flying Club are the only two active Army clubs today. Fort Leavenworth Army Flying Club was established in 1958. For many years, it was based on the north ramp at Sherman Airfield. The club was later moved inside the large hangar on the airfield. The club offers active duty and retired soldiers the opportunity to earn their pilot's certificate.

== See also ==
- Kansas World War II Army Airfields
