= Independence Municipal Airport (Kansas) =

Independence Municipal Airport (former Independence AAF)
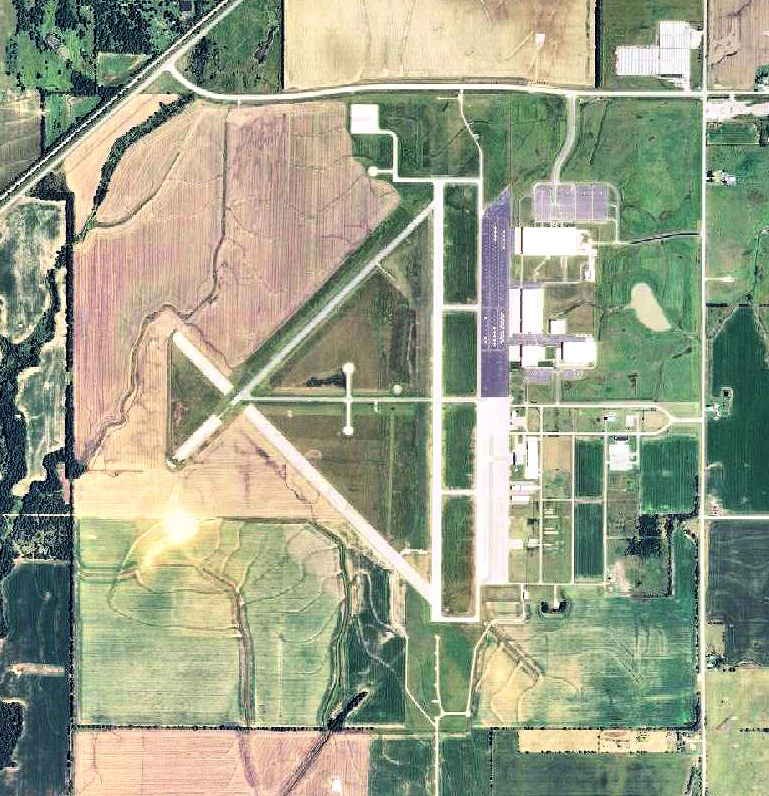
- USGS 2008 orthophoto
- IATA: IDP; ICAO: KIDP; FAA LID: IDP

Summary
- Airport type: Public
- Owner: City of Independence
- Serves: Independence, Kansas
- Location: Independence Township, Montgomery County
- Elevation AMSL: 825 ft (251 m)
- Coordinates: 37°09′30″N 095°46′42″W

Map
- Location in Kansas

Runways
Direction	Length		Surface
Direction	ft	m	Surface
4/22	3,402	1,037	Asphalt
17/35	5,501	1,677	Asphalt

Statistics (2010)
- Aircraft operations: 10,600
- Based aircraft: 20
- Source: Federal Aviation Administration

Independence Municipal Airport (IATA: IDP, ICAO: KIDP, FAA LID: IDP) is six miles southwest of Independence, in Montgomery County, Kansas. The National Plan of Integrated Airport Systems for 2011–2015 categorized it a general aviation facility.

== History ==
During World War II the facility was Independence Army Airfield and was used for United States Army Air Forces Second Air Force pilot training. Operations started in 1942 and continued through 1945. It was a storage facility for excess equipment and supplies after the war. The airfield was closed by the Air Force in 1947 and ownership was turned over to the City of Independence for use as a municipal airport. The airport has been annexed by the city, and is one of the city's industrial parks. In 2008 tower operations commenced with the first takeoff clearance given to a newly built Cessna 172R. Industries at the airport include Aviation Controls, Inc., Cessna and Kansas Aviation. The tower has since closed.

== Facilities ==
The airport covers 1,433 acres (580 ha) at an elevation of 825 feet (251 m). It has two asphalt runways: 17/35 is 5,501 by 100 feet (1,677 x 30 m) and 4/22 is 3,402 by 60 feet (1,037 x 18 m).

In the year ending September 22, 2010 the airport had 10,600 aircraft operations, average 29 per day: 86% general aviation, 13% air taxi, and 1% military. 20 aircraft were then based at the airport: 80% single-engine, 10% multi-engine, and 10% ultralight.

== See also ==
- List of airports in Kansas
