= Herington Regional Airport =

Herington Regional Airport (former Herington Army Airfield)
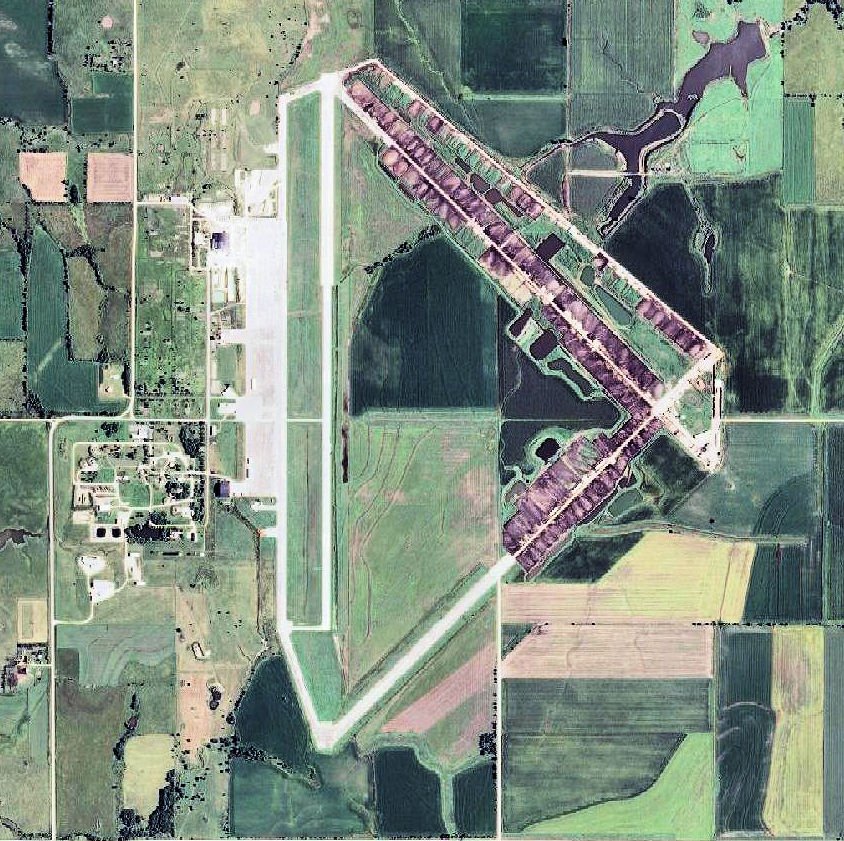
- USGS 2006 orthophoto
- IATA: none; ICAO: KHRU; FAA LID: HRU

Summary
- Airport type: Public
- Owner: City of Herington
- Serves: Herington, Kansas, U.S.
- Location: Morris County
- Elevation AMSL: 1,481 ft (451 m)
- Coordinates: 38°41′41″N 096°48′29″W

Map
- Location of airport in Kansas

Runways
| Direction | Length | | Surface |
| Direction | ft | m | Surface |
|---|---|---|---|
| 17/35 | 4,184 | 1,275 | Concrete |

Statistics (2009)
- Aircraft operations: 12,600
- Based aircraft: 11
- Source: Federal Aviation Administration

Herington Regional Airport (ICAO: KHRU, FAA LID: HRU) is a public use airport in Morris County, Kansas, United States. The airport is owned by the City of Herington and is located seven nautical miles (8 mi, 13 km) northeast of its central business district. Although the airport is in Morris County, most of Herington is located in Dickinson County. Previously known as Herington Municipal Airport, the airport is located on the site of the former Herington Army Airfield. This airport is included in the National Plan of Integrated Airport Systems for 2011–2015, which categorized it as a general aviation facility.

This airport is assigned a three-letter location identifier of HRU by the Federal Aviation Administration, but it does not have an International Air Transport Association (IATA) airport code.

== History ==
During World War II, the facility was known as Herington Army Airfield and was used as a United States Army Air Forces Second Air Force as a staging area for overseas deployment of heavy bombers and their crews. These bombers included the models B-17, B-24, and B-29. The facilities at the field included runways, hangars, fuel storage tanks, barracks, administration buildings, and other related structures necessary for airfield operations. Construction started in 1942, and the field was completed over a 14-month period.

In 1945 Herington AAF was deactivated and then declared surplus in 1946. All the property was eventually disposed of and became the Herington Municipal Airport.

== Facilities and aircraft ==
Herington Regional Airport covers an area of 1,709 acres (692 ha) at an elevation of 1,481 feet (451 m) above mean sea level. It has one runway designated 17/35 with a concrete surface measuring 4,184 by 75 feet (1,275 x 23 m).

For the 12-month period ending July 23, 2009, the airport had 12,600 aircraft operations, an average of 34 per day: 92% general aviation and 8% military. At that time there were 11 aircraft based at this airport: 82% single-engine and 18% ultralight.

== See also ==
- List of airports in Kansas
