= Meyers–Diver's Airport =

Public use airport in Tecumseh, Michigan

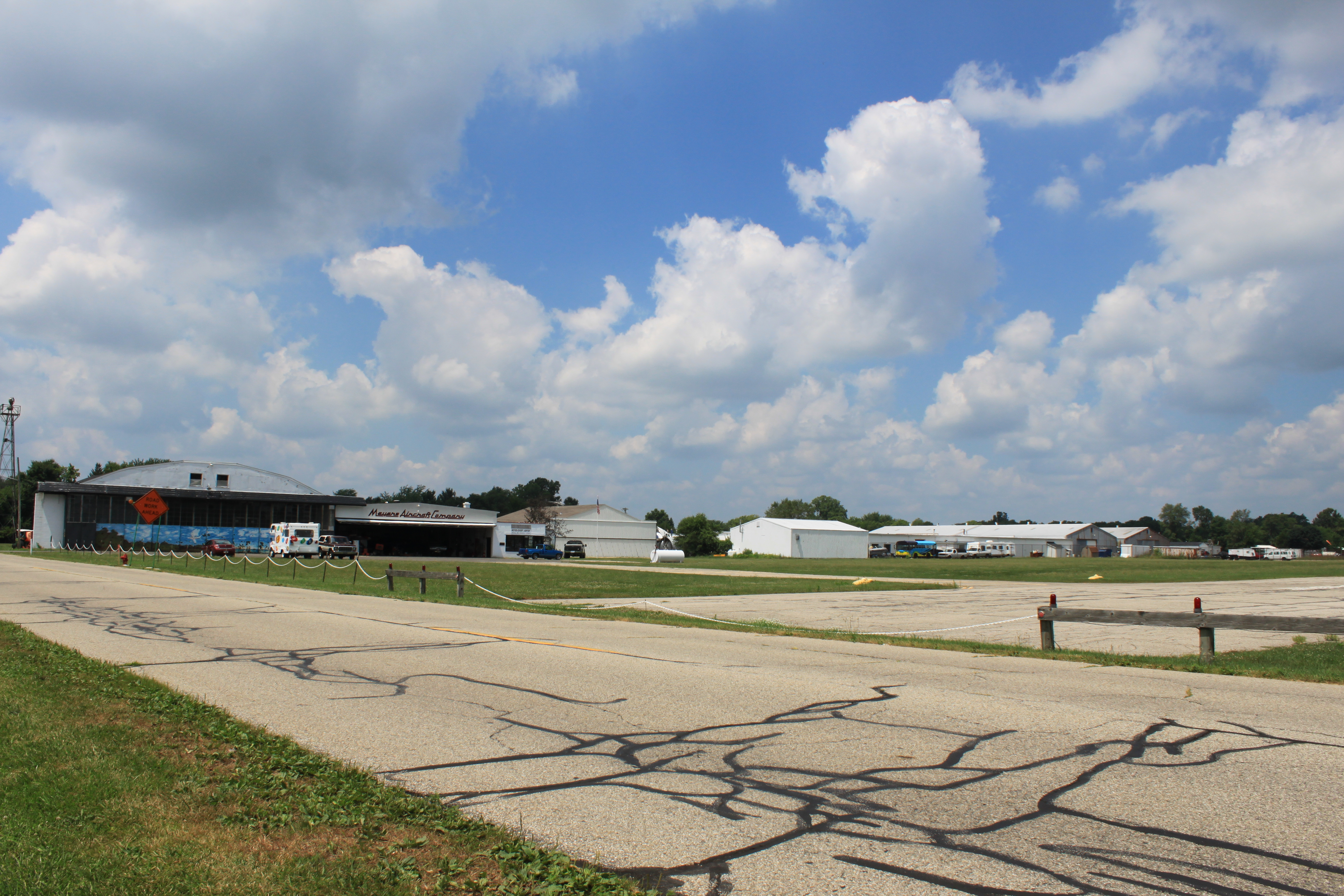
- Meyers–Diver's Airport
- IATA: none; ICAO: none; FAA LID: 3TE

Summary
- Airport type: Public
- Owner: Al Meyers Airport Inc.
- Operator: Andy Alto
- Serves: Tecumseh, Michigan
- Location: 4330 Macon Highway; Tecumseh, Michigan 49286
- Time zone: UTC−05:00 (-5)
  - Summer (DST): UTC−04:00 (-4)
- Elevation AMSL: 815 ft (248 m)
- Coordinates: 42°01′30.25″N 83°56′20.99″W

Map
- Location of airport in Michigan 3TE (the United States)

Runways
Direction	Length		Surface
Direction	ft	m	Surface
9/27	1,820	555	Turf
18/36	2,660	811	Asphalt

Statistics (2020)
- Aircraft Movements: 996
- Based Aircraft: 12

Al Meyers Airport Informational Designation
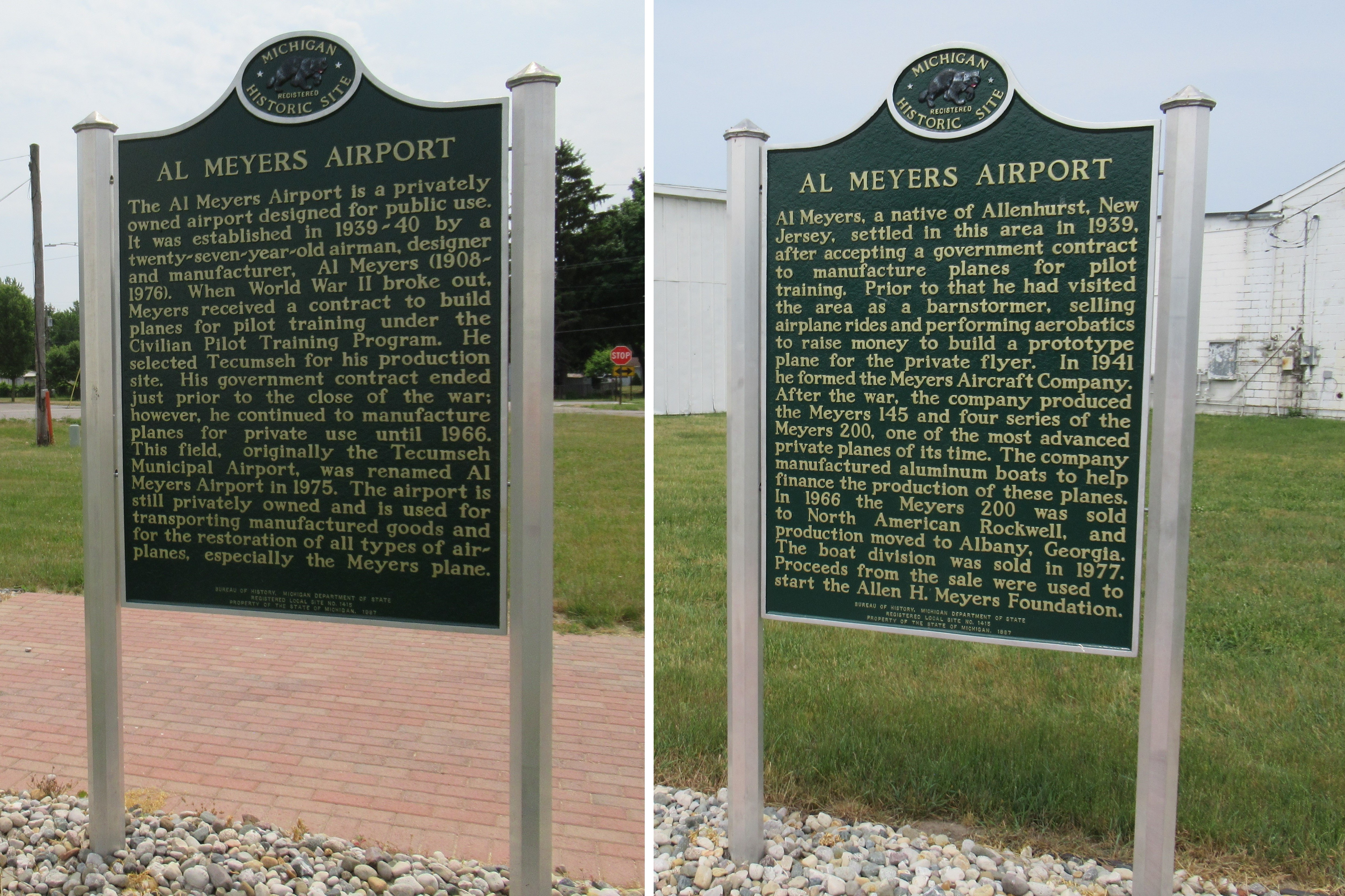
- Interactive map of Al Meyers Airport; Informational Designation
- 42°01′18″N 83°56′26″W
- Location: 4330 Macon Highway; Tecumseh, Michigan

Michigan State Historic Site
- Designated: May 15, 1987

Meyers–Diver's Airport (FAA LID: 3TE) is located in Tecumseh, Michigan, United States. It is at an elevation of 815 feet. It is owned by Al Meyers Airport, Inc., and managed by Andy Alto.

In the early 1950s, the airport was the location of the Meyers Aircraft Company, where the Meyers MAC-145 was produced. The airport was formerly named the Al Meyers Airport, after the founder of Meyers Aircraft Co.

The airport is a skydiving drop zone. Its main skydiving facility was shut down in 2015 over safety concerns.

== Facilities and aircraft ==
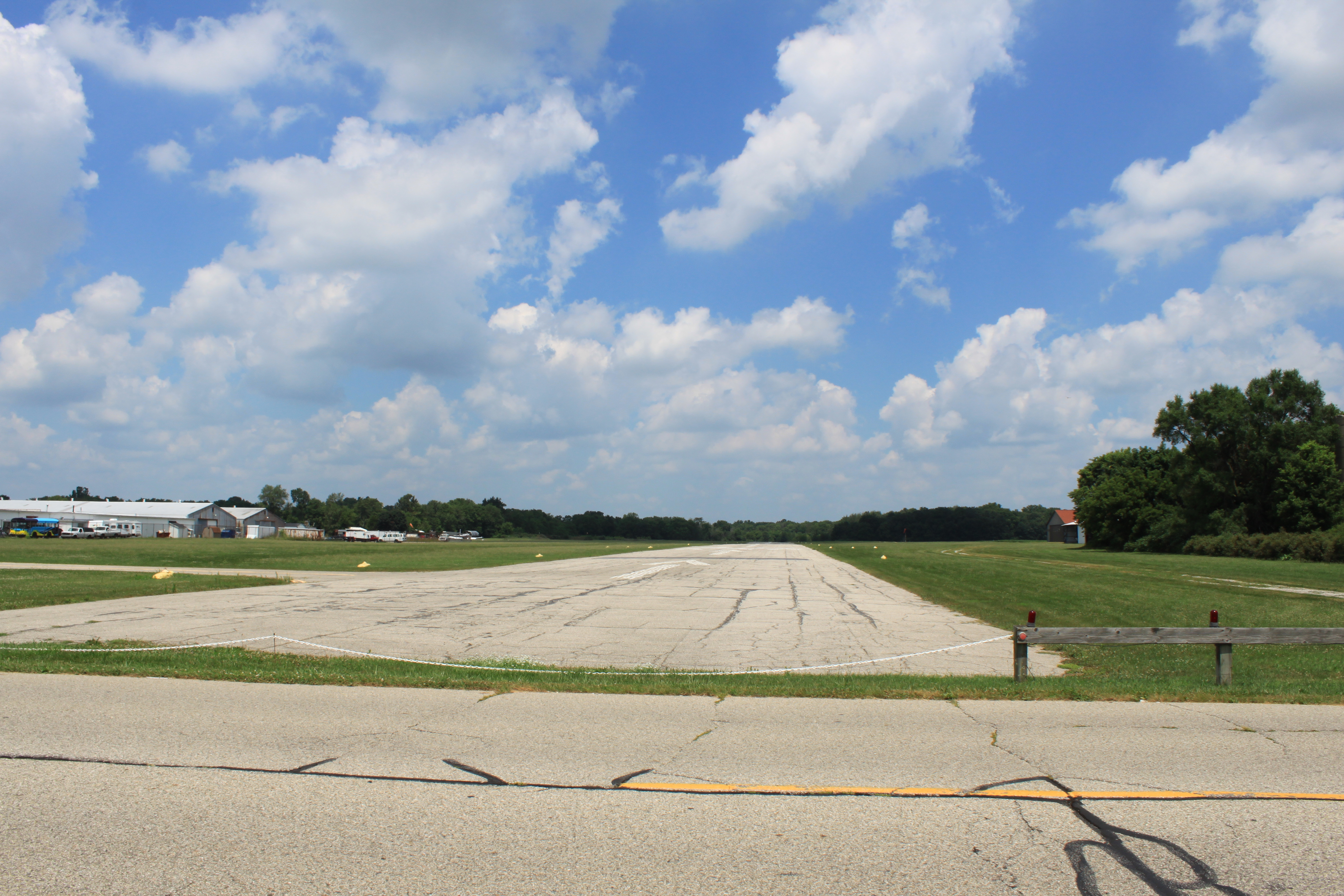
Runway from Macon Road

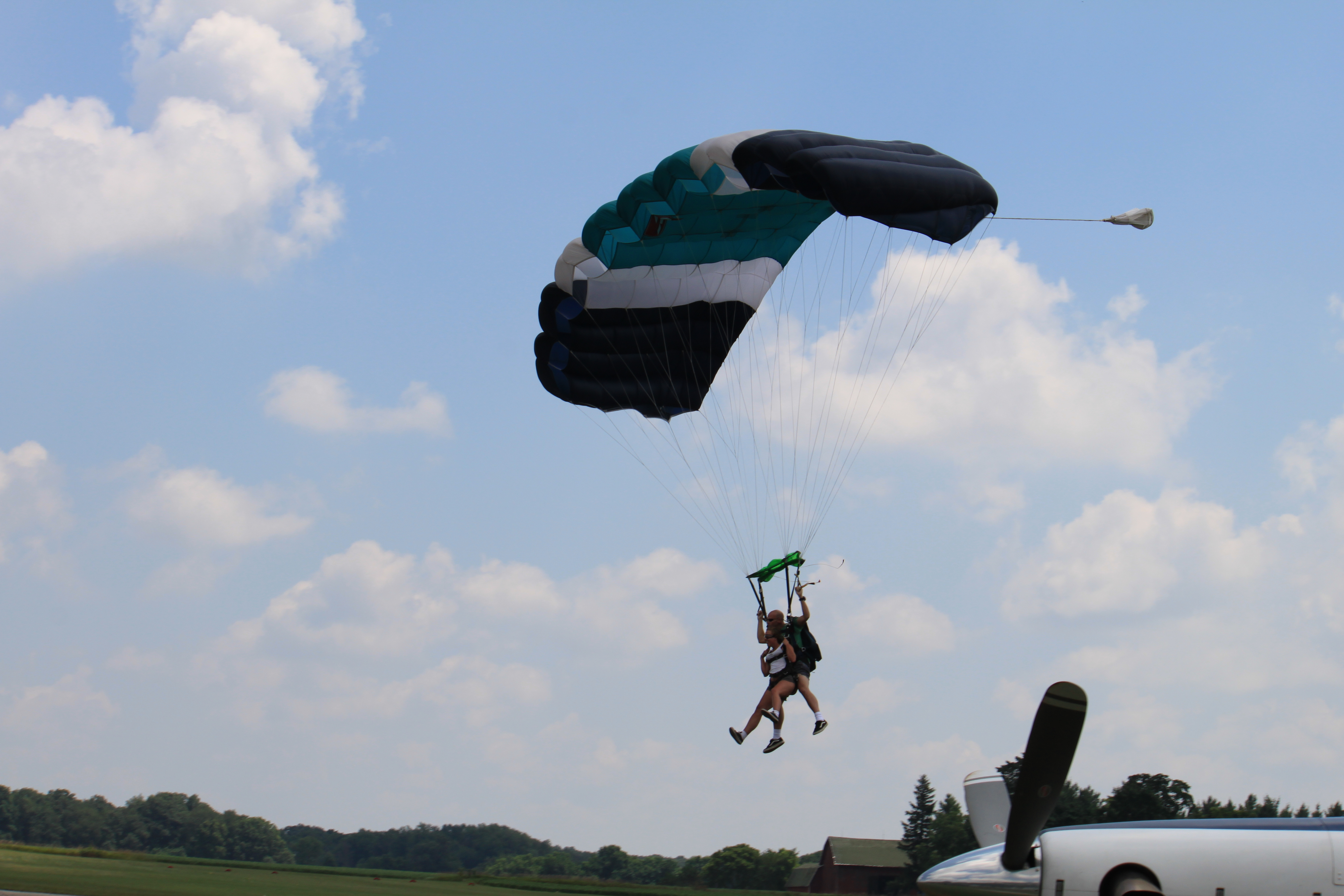
Tandem skydiving landing at the airport

The airport has two runways. Runway 18/36 measures 2649 x 75 ft (807 x 23 m) and is paved with asphalt. Runway 9/27 measures 1820 x 50 ft (555 x 15 m) and is turf.

For the 12-month period ending December 31, 2020, the airport had 996 aircraft operations, an average of 83 per month, entirely general aviation. For the same time period, 12 aircraft were based at the airport, all airplanes: 11 single-engine and 1 multi-engine.

== Accidents and incidents ==
- On April 2, 2001, a Meyers 200A sustained substantial damage on impact with trees and terrain during a forced landing following an in-flight loss of engine power on initial climb out from Meyers–Diver's Airport. The aircraft had just been released from an annual inspection, and the pilot had completed some personal tests and inspections on the aircraft. Upon takeoff from the airport, everything seemed normal until just after takeoff, when the aircraft lost power a few hundred feet above the ground. The pilot tried to trouble shoot but reported that the stall horn sounded and the plane subsequently went down. A fire ignited immediately after the crash. The probable cause of the accident was found to be fuel starvation, with contributing factors including a loose fuel distribution valve and an inadequate annual inspection.
- On July 31, 2008, an Aero Commander 200D crashed while landing at Meyers–Diver's Airport. The pilot reported that the landing approach was uneventful up to the flare and touchdown. He increased engine power just prior to landing because he thought the airplane was slow. He rounded-out and flared higher than normal, and then the airplane "hit hard" on all three landing gear. The airplane began to porpoise between the nose and main landing gear, but eventually settled onto all three landing gear. The airplane then made an uncommanded left swerve that the pilot was unable to counteract. The nose landing gear separated from the airplane when the airplane nose impacted a non-breakaway steel runway light. The airplane then nosed over in the grass easement off the left side of the runway. The probable cause of the accident was found to be the pilot's improper flare and his inadvertent pilot-induced oscillation during the landing flare/touchdown.
- In 2013, a Quest Kodiak aircraft operated by the skydiving facility at the airport had a close encounter with a Spirit Airlines Airbus A319 bound for Dallas. After taking off from Detroit, the Spirit jet responded to an onboard traffic alert caused by a loss of separation with the skydiving plane. The skydive pilot maintained visual separation with the Spirit jet. Both flights continued uneventfully after the incident.
- On November 3, 2015, a Piper PA-18 Super Cub was substantially damaged when it collided with trees during an aborted landing at Meyers–Diver's Airport. The pilot made a normal two-point landing, but as the airplane traversed over the crossing runway 18/36, the airplane bounced back into the air near midfield. The pilot increased engine power after the bounce and subsequently made a full-stall (three-point) landing on the remaining runway. The pilot reported that the airplane immediately veered to the left after the tailwheel made contact with the runway. The airplane subsequently departed the left side of the runway into a grass field. The pilot reported that he was able to regain directional control and reestablish a ground track that was parallel to the runway before he attempted an aborted landing from the grass field. Although he was able to get the airplane airborne, the pilot was unable to clear trees that were located along an airport perimeter road. The airplane sustained substantial damage to the wings and fuselage during the collision with the trees. The probable cause of the accident was found to be the pilot's failure to maintain directional control during the landing and his subsequent improper decision to attempt an aborted landing after the airplane had departed the runway.

== See also ==
- List of airports in Michigan
