= Meyers Me-165W =

Me-165W

General information
- Type: Light trainer
- National origin: United States
- Manufacturer: Meyers Aircraft Company
- Designer: Al Meyers
- Status: Did not go into production

History
- Manufactured: 1
- Introduction date: 1942

The Meyers Me-165W was a tandem-seat trainer designed for the American Civilian Pilot Training Program requirement during the Second World War.

== Design and development ==
The Me-165W was a wire-braced, low-wing, open cockpit, tandem seat, monoplane with conventional landing gear. The fuselage was constructed from welded steel tubing with aircraft fabric covering. The wings used wooden spars and ribs with fabric covering. The wings were wire braced, with a slight gull wing profile.

The Me-165W was test flown for six months. The aircraft showed little improvement over Meyer's other trainer, the OTW. Meyers claimed the aircraft performed poorly. The program was canceled, the prototype was abandoned at the factory and later destroyed by a tornado.

== Specifications (Me-165W) ==
Data from Skyways

General characteristics

- Crew: 1
- Capacity: 1
- Length: 22 ft (6.7 m)
- Wingspan: 30 ft (9.1 m)
- Gross weight: 1,850 lb (839 kg)
- Powerplant: 1 × Warner Scarab Radial, 165 hp (123 kW)
- Propellers: 2-bladed

Performance

- Maximum speed: 117 kn (135 mph, 217 km/h)
- Cruise speed: 100 kn (115 mph, 185 km/h)

== See also ==
Related development

- Meyers OTW
