= Interceptor 400 =

General information
- Type: Light aircraft
- Manufacturer: Interceptor Corporation
- Number built: 1

History
- First flight: 27 June 1969
- Developed from: Aero Commander 200

The Interceptor 400 was a turboprop-powered single-engined light aircraft developed from the Meyers 200 single-engine piston plane. It attracted buyers but was unable to obtain adequate manufacturing financing, and was perhaps too far ahead of its time. In the late 1960s and early 1970s, at the time of its development, the market for single-engined turboprops was still a decade away.

== Design and development ==
Development of the aircraft commenced when Lymon Lyon approached Aero Commander to build him a one-off modification of the 200, to be powered by a turboprop. His request came just as Aero Commander was realizing that the 200 piston engine aircraft was not economically viable in volumes they sought, and instead, offered to sell Lyon the 200 type certificate and work that Aero Commander had begun on a turbine engine conversion model 400 instead. Lyon and a group of investors assembled by entrepreneur and merger and acquisition expert Thomas W Itin, then formed the Interceptor Corporation to develop and market the 400 turbine engine version, the Interceptor 400 aircraft.

The plant was moved from the Aero Commander site in Albany, Georgia, to Norman, Oklahoma, where the engineering was completed for the Interceptor 400 type certificate

Its first flight was on June 27, 1969, and certification was obtained in 1971. However, without adequately funded buyers, major Interceptor investor Paul Luce eventually took possession of the company's intellectual property and the prototype Interceptor 400 when the firm could not repay capital he had loaned it. The rights were then owned by Prop-Jets Inc, in which Luce maintained a 50% stake. Later Prop-Jets changed its name to Interceptor Aircraft Company, with Mr. Luce no longer being involved.

A militarized version, the Interceptor I400-M reached at least the planning stage. It was envisaged for a wide variety of roles, including training, reconnaissance, Forward Air Control, and counterinsurgency, as well as general utility duties.

On May 22, 2014, Global Parts Group, of Augusta, Kansas, announced they had acquired the type certificate of the Interceptor 400 and the Meyers 200 aircraft models. The Global Parts Group formed a separate affiliate company, Interceptor Aviation Inc., for the ownership of the type certificate, along with all assets and intellectual property related to both the Interceptor 400 and Meyers 200 type designs. In September 2019 the type certificate, design data, tooling and a complete Interceptor 400 aircraft were again offered for sale. As of 2026, the type certificate still lists the Holder as Interceptor Aviation, of Bethany, Oklahoma.

== Specifications (Interceptor 400) ==
Data from Jane's All The World's Aircraft 1971–72

General characteristics

- Crew: 1
- Capacity: 3 passengers
- Length: 26 ft 11 1/2 in (8.22 m)
- Wingspan: 30 ft 6 in (9.30 m)
- Wing area: 161.5 sq ft (15.00 m^{2})
- Aspect ratio: 5.81:1
- Empty weight: 2,300 lb (1,043 kg)
- Max takeoff weight: 4,005 lb (1,817 kg)
- Powerplant: 1 × Garrett TPE331-1-101 turboprop, 400 shp (300 kW)
- Propellers: 3-bladed Hartzell, 7 ft 2 in (2.18 m) diameter

Performance

- Maximum speed: 257 mph (414 km/h, 223 kn) at 16,000 ft (4,900 m)
- Cruise speed: 281 mph (452 km/h, 244 kn)
- Stall speed: 69 mph (111 km/h, 60 kn) (flaps and landing gear lowered)
- Never exceed speed: 300 mph (480 km/h, 260 kn)
- Range: 1,000 mi (1,600 km, 870 nmi)
- Service ceiling: 24,000 ft (7,300 m)
- Rate of climb: 2,000 ft/min (10 m/s) (at least)

== See also ==
Related development

- Meyers 200
- Meyers MAC-145

Aircraft of comparable role, configuration, and era

- Pilatus PC-12
- Piper Malibu Meridian
- SOCATA TBM

Related lists

- List of aircraft of World War II
- List of aircraft of Japan during World War II
- List of single-engined turboprop aircraft
