= F L S Z Der Kricket DK-1 =

Der Kricket DK-1
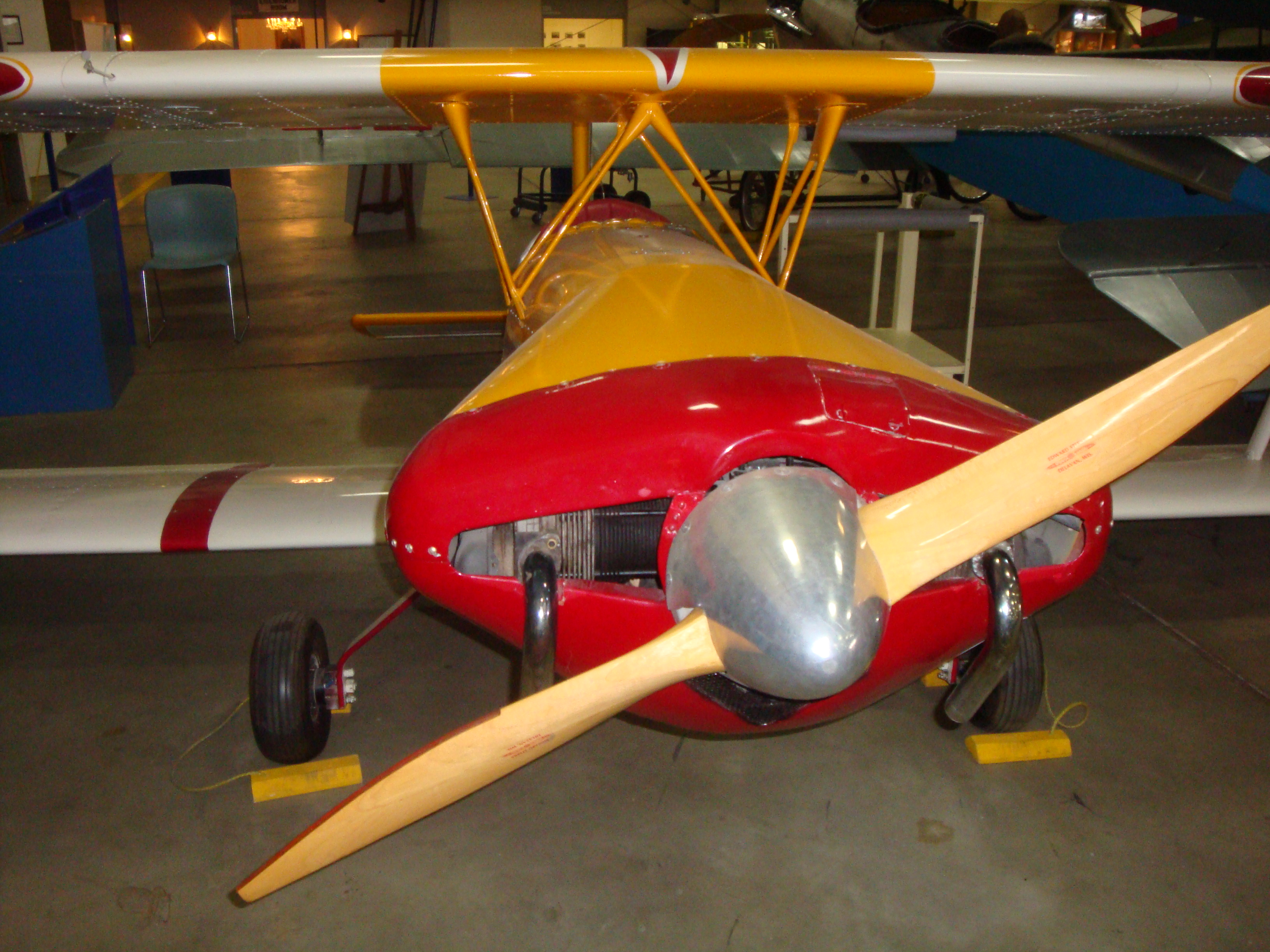
- Der Kricket DK-1 on display at the Wings Over the Rockies Air and Space Museum

General information
- Type: Single seat sport biplane
- National origin: United States
- Manufacturer: Flight Level Six_Zero (F L S Z)
- Number built: at least 7

History
- First flight: 19 September 1978

The Der Kricket DK-1 is a single seat, single engine biplane designed and built in the United States in the 1970s with an emphasis on simplicity. Several were built, as intended, by amateurs from plans in addition to some constructed by the four man design consortium.

== Design and development ==
John W. Dooley, Donald D. Miller, Cyril B. Smith and Roy E. Wheeler founded Flight Level Six_Zero (F L S Z) to design, construct and sell plans of a simple biplane. Work on the Der Kricket DK-1 began in 1971; though the first flight was not made until 19 September 1978, a second aircraft flew just five days later. The principal aim of the design was simplicity, making it easy to build and fly, straightforward to maintain and bringing good economy.

The Kricket is a clean, equal span biplane with a single I-form streamlined interplane strut on each side and N-form cabane struts bracing the upper wing over the fuselage but with no flying wires. The lower wing is mounted at the fuselage bottom. Both wings have the same span and chord and they have significant stagger but neither dihedral nor sweep. The wings have two spars and are light alloy throughout including a pop-riveted skin, though the wing tips are glass fibre covered foam. Plain ailerons are fitted only on the lower wings; there are no trim tabs on them nor inboard flaps. The rear surfaces are both single piece, all-moving alloy cantilever structures with glass-fibre tips like the wings. The tailplane is mounted on the bottom of the fuselage and the fin is tall and upright. Both have anti-servo tabs.

The fuselage is built from alloy angle, bolted and riveted together and skinned with light alloy. The plans allow for either flat or rounded sides, the latter requiring just one extra angle piece per side. The Kricket is powered by a 50-65 hp (37-48 kW) flat-four Volkswagen air-cooled engine, installed with its cylinder heads and exhausts exposed outside the engine cowling, which drives a two blade propeller. The single seat places the pilot behind the trailing edge of the upper wing, giving him reasonable upward vision. Behind him the ventral decking slopes down to the tail. There is a fixed, conventional undercarriage with main wheels fitted with mechanical brakes, enclosed in speed fairings and mounted on wire braced, faired, light-alloy legs. The tail wheel is mounted on a long, shallowly inclined leg which reaches back to the elevator trailing edge.

== Operational history ==
Three Krickets were completed by F L S Z and registered in a consecutive block in the names of Dooley, Miller and Smith. The FAA register records four other examples, some at least of which were home-built by individuals from plans.

== Aircraft on display ==
- Der Kricket DK-1 N603DM (ex-Donald Miller) is on display at the Wings Over the Rockies Air and Space Museum, Denver.
- Der Kricket DK-1 N601CS is on display at the Mid-America Air Museum, Liberal, Kansas.

== Specifications ==
Data from Jane's All the World's Aircraft 1981-82 All performance at maximum take-off weight.

General characteristics

- Crew: One
- Length: 16 ft 0 in (4.88 m)
- Wingspan: 16 ft 0 in (4.88 m) both upper and lower
- Height: 5 ft 6 in (1.68 m)
- Wing area: 96.0 sq ft (8.92 m^{2})
- Aspect ratio: 5.33
- Airfoil: NACA 4412
- Empty weight: 549 lb (249 kg)
- Max takeoff weight: 780 lb (354 kg)
- Fuel capacity: 8 US gal (6.7 Imp gal; 30.3 L)
- Powerplant: 1 × Volkswagen air-cooled flat-four, 60 hp (45 kW) approximate power
- Propellers: 2-bladed Cassidy, 4 ft 6 in (1.37 m) diameter wooden, fixed pitch

Performance

- Maximum speed: 115 mph (185 km/h, 100 kn)
- Cruise speed: 95 mph (153 km/h, 83 kn) economical
- Stall speed: 52 mph (84 km/h, 45 kn) power off
- Never exceed speed: 138 mph (222 km/h, 120 kn)
- Range: 200 mi (322 km, 174 nmi) maximum fuel
- Service ceiling: 12,000 ft (3,700 m) service
- Rate of climb: 830 ft/min (4.2 m/s) at sea level
- Take-off run: 700 ft (213 m)
- Take-off to 50 ft (15 m): 1,100 ft (335 m)
- Landing from 50 ft (15 m): 950 ft (290 m)
- Landing run: 650 ft (198 m)
