= Meyers OTW =

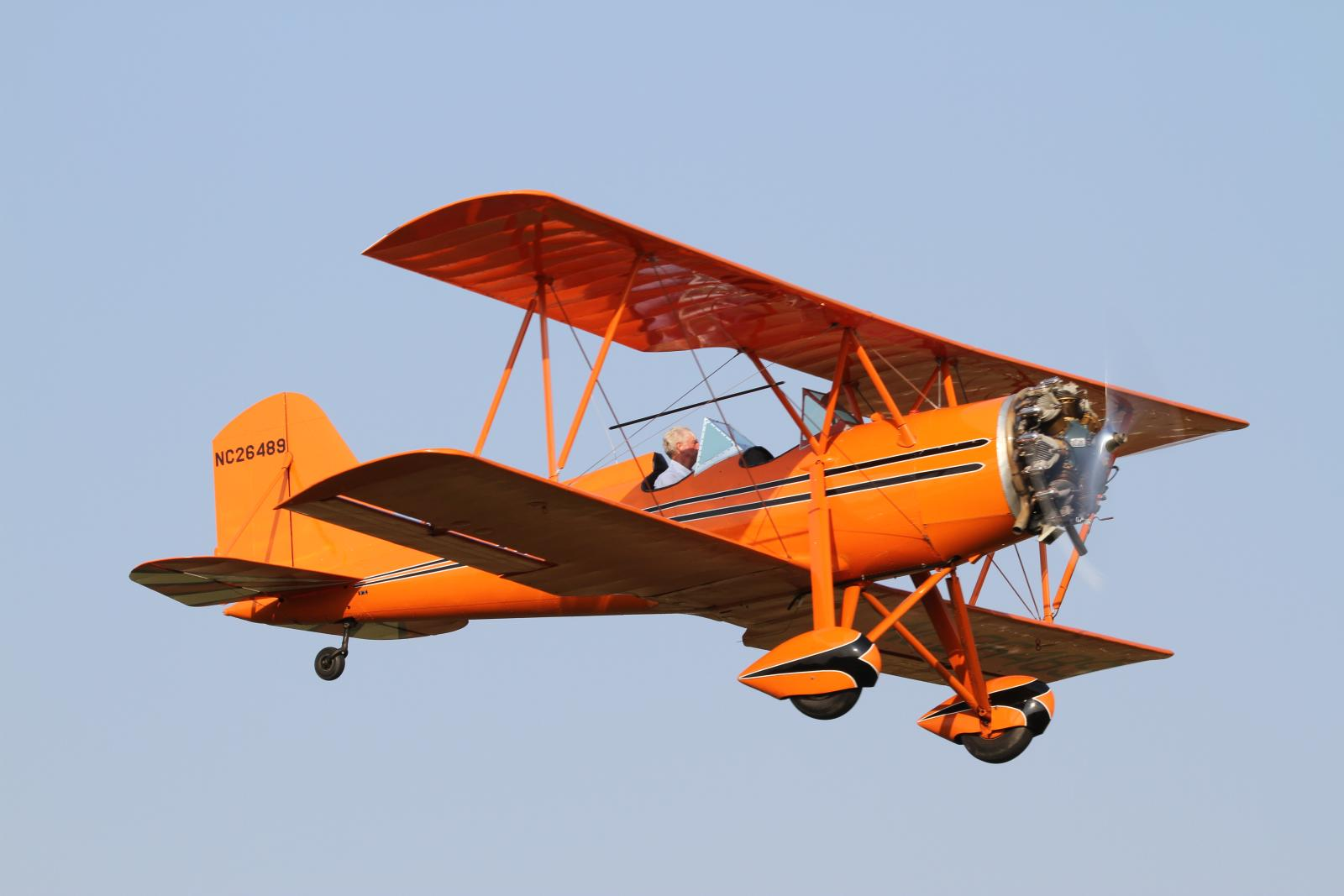
- Meyers OTW

General information
- Type: Training biplane
- Manufacturer: Meyers Aircraft Company
- Designer: Allen Meyers
- Number built: 102

History
- Manufactured: 1936-1944
- First flight: 1936

The Meyers OTW (Out To Win) was a 1930s United States training biplane designed by Allen Meyers and built by his Meyers Aircraft Company from 1936 to 1944.

== Development ==
In anticipation for a demand for training aircraft caused by the introduction of a civilian war training scheme (in which civil flying schools would provide primary training for the military), Allen Meyers designed the OTW and formed the Meyers Aircraft Company to build it. The OTW was a conventional biplane with tandem seating for two in open cockpits and a fixed tailwheel landing gear. The prototype was powered by a 125 hp (93 kW) Warner Scarab engine and it first flew on 10 May 1936. The aircraft was produced in two main variants; the OTW-145 powered by a 145 hp (108 kW) Warner Super Scarab, and the OTW-160 powered by a 160 hp (119 kW) Kinner R-5 engine.

== Variants ==
OTW-125
Production variant with 125hp (93kW) Warner Scarab engine.
OTW-145
Production variant with 145hp (108kW) Warner Super Scarab engine.
OTW-160
Final production variant with 160hp (119kW) Kinner R-5 engine.
OTW-KR
One aircraft was re-engined with a 120hp (89kW) Ken-Royce 7G engine.

== Surviving aircraft ==
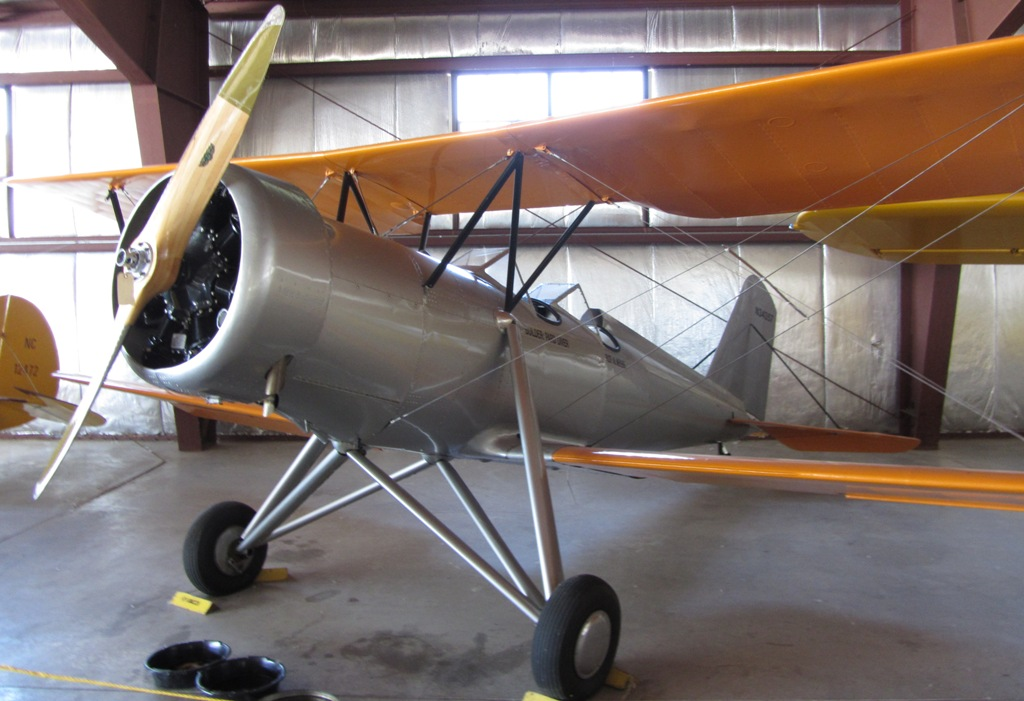
A Meyers OTW on display in the EAA AirVenture Museum

- 1 – On static display at the Combat Air Museum in Topeka, Kansas. It was acquired by the museum in late 1986.
- 2 – Airworthy with Russell W. Kilmer of Yuba City, California.
- 45 – Airworthy with James Kieran Padden in Longhirst, Northumberland.
- 53 – Airworthy at the Pioneer Flight Museum in Kingsbury, Texas.
- 57 – Airworthy with Theodore K. Heckman in Allegan, Michigan.
- 61 -- Airworthy at the National Warplane Museum Geneseo, New York
- 70 – Airworthy with Jack Belletete in Jaffrey, New Hampshire.
- 75 – Airworthy with Cecil D. Bradford of Huntersville, North Carolina.
- 77 -- Airworthy with Tyson B. Hunt in Hagaman, New York
- 102 – On static display at the EAA Aviation Museum in Oshkosh, Wisconsin. It was the last OTW built and was assembled from parts to be the personal aircraft of Allen Meyers.

== Specifications (OTW-160) ==
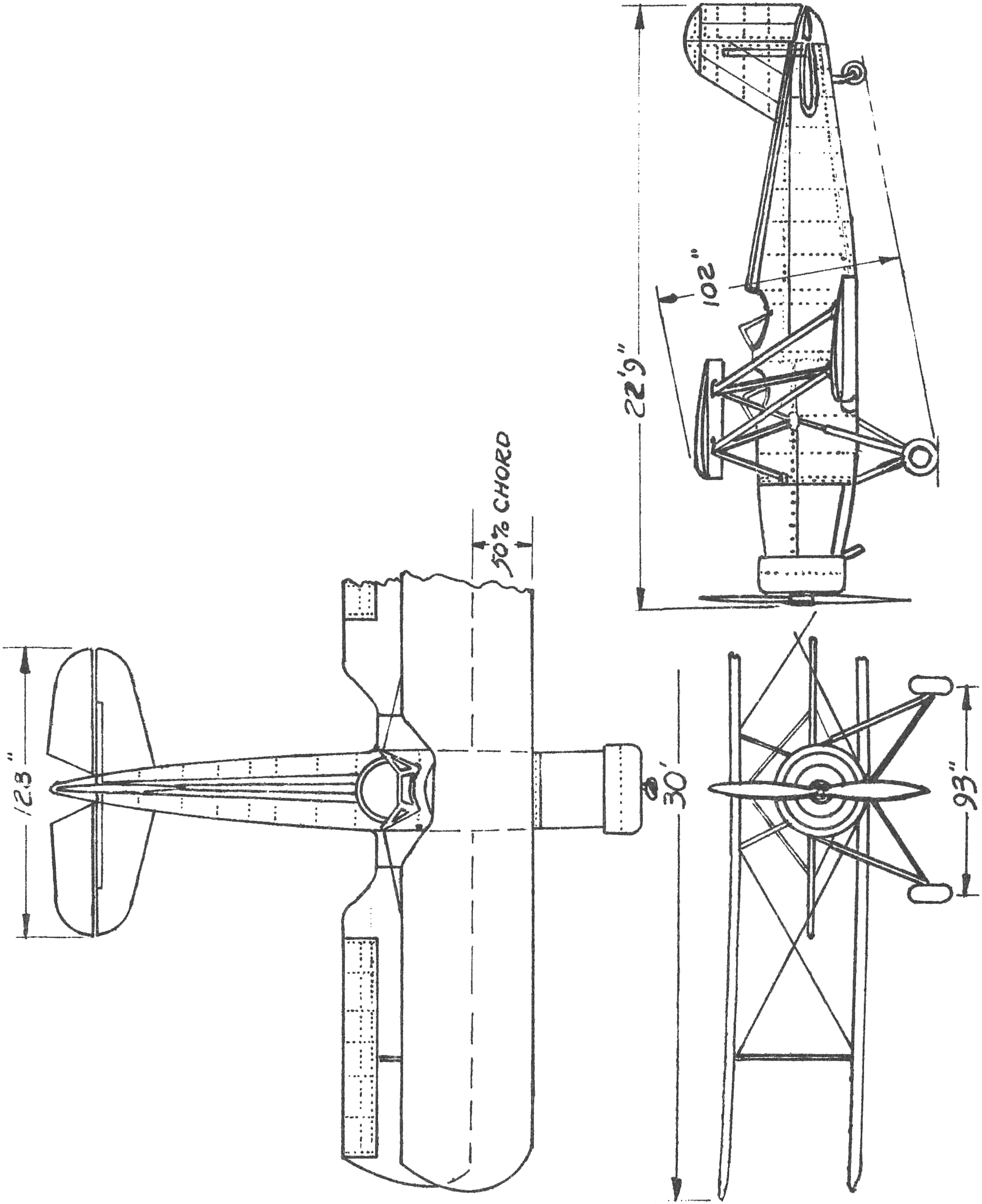
3-view line drawing of the Meyers OTW

Data from Jane's all the World's Aircraft 1947.

General characteristics

- Crew: 2
- Length: 25 ft 11 in (7.91 m)
- Wingspan: 30 ft 0 in (9.14 m)
- Height: 8 ft 6 in (2.59 m)
- Wing area: 262 sq ft (24.3 m^{2})
- Empty weight: 1,340 lb (608 kg)
- Gross weight: 1,910 lb (866 kg)
- Fuel capacity: 26 US gal (22 imp gal; 98 L)
- Powerplant: 1 × Kinner R-56 5-cyl. air-cooled radial piston engine, 160 hp (120 kW)
- Propellers: 2-bladed fixed pitch propeller

Performance

- Maximum speed: 120 mph (190 km/h, 100 kn)
- Cruise speed: 105 mph (169 km/h, 91 kn)
- Range: 400 mi (640 km, 350 nmi)
- Service ceiling: 17,500 ft (5,300 m)
- Rate of climb: 1,200 ft/min (6.1 m/s)
- Wing loading: 7.25 lb/sq ft (35.4 kg/m^{2})
- Power/mass: 11.81 lb/hp (7.17 kg/kW)
- Landing speed: 40 mph (35 kn; 64 km/h)

== See also ==
- Civilian Pilot Training Program

Related development

- Meyers Me-165W
