= Mid-America Air Museum =

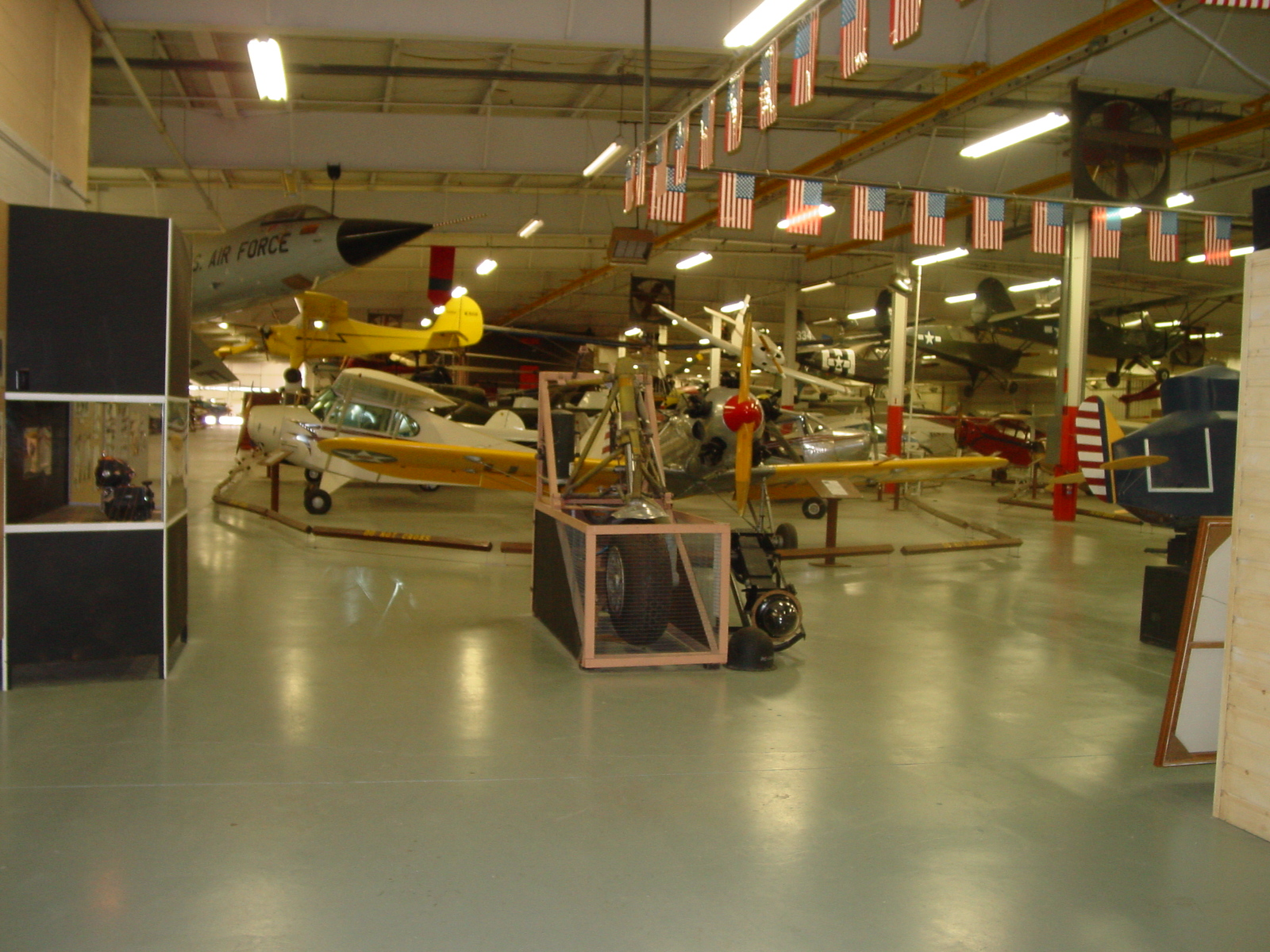

- Location within Kansas Location within the United States
- Established: 1988; 38 years ago
- Location: 2000 W 2nd Street; Liberal, KS; United States
- Coordinates: 37°02′21″N 100°57′04″W
- Type: Aviation museum
- Visitors: 12,000 / year
- Founder: Tom A. Thomas Jr.
- Director: Bob Immell
- Website: Mid-America-Air-Museum

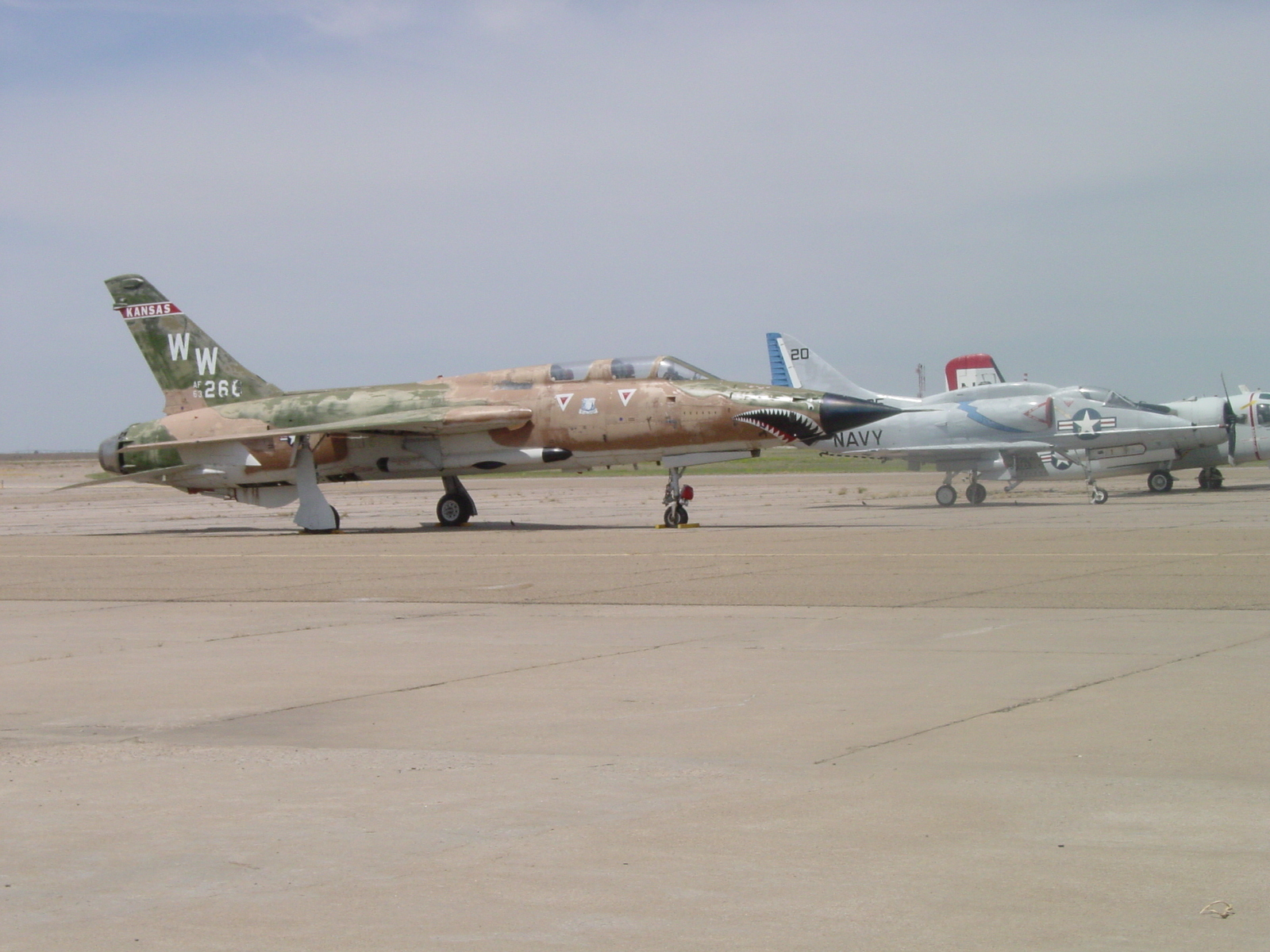
An external picture of the Mid-America Air Museum

The Mid-America Air Museum is an aerospace and aircraft museum located at the Liberal Mid-America Regional Airport in Liberal, Kansas, United States.

The Mid-America Air Museum is the largest aircraft museum in Kansas. It has on display over 100 aircraft (both within the museum's primary building and on the adjacent tarmac), a gift store, and several displays of photographs and ephemera relating to the history of aviation in the region.

== History ==
The museum is on Liberal Mid-America Regional Airport, originally known as Liberal Army Air Field that served as a B-24 Liberator training base during the Second World War.

The museum is located within a hangar that formerly belonged to Beech Aircraft, where Beech produced Beech Musketeer, Beechcraft Baron, and Beechcraft Duchess light airplanes, in the 1960s and 1970s.

The museum started with the donation, by the late Colonel Tom Thomas, Jr., of his personal collection: over 50 aircraft (valued at over $3 million) to the City of Liberal.

It originally opened as the Mid America Air Group Flying Museum in 1984 in Ada, Oklahoma with 38 planes.

The museum reached an agreement with the Kansas Aviation Museum regarding used of that name in July 1991.

== Collection ==
The Mid-America Air Museum's collection includes:

- Aero Commander 520 N711YY / 520-76
- Aero Commander CallAir A-9B N671W
- Aero Designs Pulsar 582-N N62817
- Aeronca 7AC Champion N2735E
- Aeronca 65C Chief N23547
- Aeronca K Scout N19339
- Aeronca L-3B Grasshopper N48433
- Air & Space 18C Flymobil N6128S
- Armstrong Aeronaut N77VA
- Avid Flyer N31BL
- Avro 504K (replica)
- Beechcraft F17D Staggerwing N139KP
- Beechcraft 2000A Starship N1556S
- Beechcraft 35 Bonanza N80441
- Beechcraft AT-7C Navigator N65314
- Beechcraft B19 Musketeer Sport N1978W
- Beechcraft T-34B Mentor
- Beechcraft Travel Air N833B
- Bell AH-1G Cobra 71-21038
- Bell AH-1W SuperCobra 160817
- Bell OH-13H Sioux 55-4619
- Bell UH-1D Iroquois 66-1204
- Bellanca 14-13-2 Cruisair Senior N74456
- Breezy RLU-1 N1380E
- Bushby Mustang II N32DC
- Cessna 120 N72948
- Cessna 140 N76483
- Cessna 175 N7205M
- Cessna 195A N9864A
- Cessna C-145 Airmaster NC19462
- Cessna C-165 Airmaster NC32450
- Cessna 337A Super Skymaster N6274F
- Cessna UC-78 Bobcat N711UU
- Cessna XT-37 54-0718
- Culver Model V N3116K
- Curtis Wright CW-1 Junior N10973
- Douglas A-4C Skyhawk 149635
- ERCO 415-G Ercoupe N94886
- Fairchild PT-19A Cornell N49942 and N91095
- Fairchild PT-23A Cornell N63739
- Flight Level Six Zero Der Kricket DK-1 N601CS
- Fly Baby 1A
- Funk B-75-L N24174
- General Motors TBM-3E Avenger N6831C
- Globe GC-1B Swift N78159
- Grumman F-14A Tomcat 160903
- Grumman S2F-1 Tracker N5470C / 133179
- HAL Gnat E1222
- Hughes OH-6A Cayuse 66-7865
- Interstate L-6 Cadet N37214
- Lakeland Flyers Inc 2/3 Scale P-51 Mustang N951JH
- Lockheed F-80C Shooting Star 49-0710
- Lockheed F-104C Starfighter 56-0933
- LTV A-7D Corsair II 73-1009
- Luscombe 8A Silvaire N1172B
- Luscombe T8F Observer N1580B
- MacFam Cavalier SA102.5 N12RG
- McCulloch J-2 N4374G
- McDonnell Douglas F-4D Phantom II 66-7746
- Miller S-1 Fly Rod N22RM
- Monnett Moni N124KB
- Mooney M-18C Mite N4140
- North American F-86H Sabre 53-1501
- North American TB-25N Mitchell N9462Z / 44-30535
- North American YOV-10A Bronco 152880
- Northrop Q-19 Target Drone
- Northrop T-38A Talon 60-0583
- Pereira X-28A Osprey 158786
- Phoenix 6C Hang Glider
- Piasecki HUP-3 Retriever 147628
- Pietenpol B4-A Air Camper N2NK
- Piper J3C-65 Cub NC26815
- Piper J-4F Cub Coupe NC30426
- Piper PA-22-135 Tri-Pacer N1129C
- Piper PA-23 Apache N1015P
- Piper PA-23-250 Aztec N4581P
- Piper PA-24-250 Comanche N110LF
- Pober Pixie N8509Z
- Porterfield CP-65 Collegiate N32431
- Rand Robinson KR-1 N982GS and N31SB
- Rearwin 175 Skyranger N32402
- Rearwin 7000 Sportster NC18768
- Rearwin 8135T Cloudstar N37753
- Republic F-105G Thunderchief 63-8266
- Riley D-16 Twin Navion N3797G
- Rotec Rally 3 Big Lifter
- RotorWay Scorpion 133
- Royal Aircraft Factory S.E.5a replica N3922D
- Rutan Quickie N1176L
- Rutan VariEze N859
- Ryan ST-3KR N46741
- Shober Willie II N113BT
- Staib LB-5
- Steen Skybolt N120VL
- Stinson 10A Voyager N34690
- Stinson L-5 Sentinel N66334 / 76-2942
- Stinson V77 Reliant N9362H
- Taylorcraft L-2M Grasshopper N49174
- Thorp T-18 N35GW
- Viking Dragonfly N202RG
- Vought F-8H Crusader 148693
- Vought F4U-5N Corsair N100CV / 124447
- Vultee SNV-2 Valiant N67316

== See also ==
- Liberal Army Air Field
- Liberal Mid-America Regional Airport
- Cosmosphere in Hutchinson
- Combat Air Museum in Topeka
- Kansas Aviation Museum in Wichita
- Kansas World War II army airfields
- List of aerospace museums
- List of museums in Kansas
