= Liberal Army Air Field =

World War II heavy bomber training base

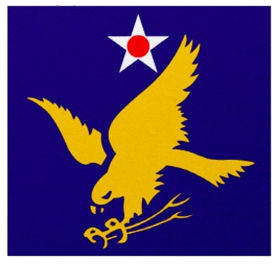
Liberal Army Airfield
- Part of Second Air Force
- Located near Liberal, Kansas
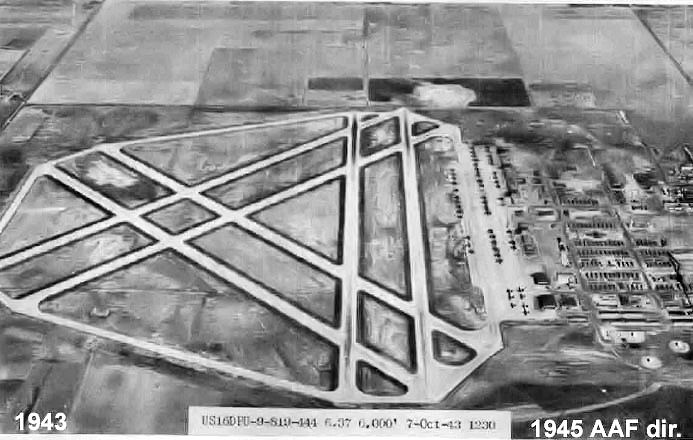
- Liberal Army Airfield 7 Oct 1943

Site information
- Type: Training Airfield

Location
- Coordinates: 37°02′39″N 100°57′36″W

Site history
- Built: 1943
- In use: 1943-1945

Liberal Army Airfield was a World War II Consolidated B-24 Liberator heavy bomber training base of the United States Army Air Forces' Second Air Force. It is currently the city-owned Liberal Mid-America Regional Airport.

== History ==
The first tangible move to implement the decision to locate an Army Air Corps four-engine pilot school on a site selected one mile west of Liberal in western Kansas, was the grant of a contract to Murray A. Wilson and Company, engineers, to make a complete survey and layout for an airfield. The new airfield was situated in Sections 1, 6, 25, 30, 31, and 36, Townships 34 and 35 South, and Ranges 33 and 34 West, with a dimension of two miles north and south and two miles east and west. The field formed part of a flat, low plateau.

By 16 January 1943 the survey had been completed. But even before the survey had been officially finished, contracts were let on 9 January, with Peter Kiewit Sons named as prime contractor. The entire field, some 1,946.7 acres, was purchased by the government. In addition, 3.3 acres on the north extremity of the north-south runway were leased to provide zone clearance space. Just nine days later construction began on the site.

Facilities on Liberal Army Airfield were to cost approximately $8,000,000. Initially three concrete runways were built, each 7,000 feet in length and 150 feet wide, with a gross load capacity of 37,000 pounds. Portable B-2 type runway lights were installed. In addition, a concrete parking apron of some 276,318 square yards was constructed, along with three concrete taxiways 100 feet in width. In 1943, a second set of three runways, identical and parallel to the first three were built. An enclosing loop taxiway was also constructed. This doubled the capacity of the airfield for landings and takeoffs.

Training facilities included three school buildings and four buildings housing Link Trainers. Five hangars were built, two of steel and three of wood. Three large warehouses and storage facilities for 591,000 gallons of gasoline were built. Construction coming under the general category of recreation and welfare included a gymnasium, officers' club, service club, theater, chapel, and three post exchanges. A spur line of the Rock Island Railroad was run onto the field from the main line. Housing facilities for 4,934 officers and men and a hospital with a normal bed capacity of 142 were constructed. All buildings were of mobilization type construction.

In addition to the main installation, Gage Auxiliary Field, 36°17′43″N 099°46′35″W a former municipal airport, was acquired by lease. This field, some 81 miles from Liberal Army Air Field, comprised 780 acres providing two hard surfaced runways, each of which was 5,500 feet in length and 150 feet wide.

=== B-24 Liberator Basic Training School ===
In April 1943, before completion of construction, the initial group of officers and men of the original cadre reported. Liberal AAF was officially opened on 13 May 1943. It was under the jurisdiction of the Army Air Forces Pilot School (Specialized 4-Engines), II Bomber Command, Second Air Force. The mission of the base was to train Consolidated B-24 Liberator heavy bomber pilots, who were predominantly newly commissioned officers graduated from Training Command advanced twin-engine flying schools.

Additional personnel arrived during subsequent weeks. In the midst of construction, personnel acquisition moved into an intensified phase during April and May, so that the base was actively manned by the time the first B-24s to be used in training set down on the brand new runways on 20 June. That scheduling was extremely close during those hectic days can be seen in that only ten days later, on 1 July, the members of the first class were introduced to the Liberators. This is the official date of the inauguration of training at Liberal, barely six months after construction began. Initially and for a considerable time the commanding officer of the field was in charge of the several squadrons and detachments which performed the various functions requisite to the functioning of the school.

The training cycle was nine weeks in length. Halfway through the cycle of the first class, another class began the course, so that, afterward, a class graduated every four and a half weeks. By 8 December 1943 Col. R. C. Rockwood, operations and training officer, was able to tell a group of civilian employees that "we are now training approximately one-fourth of the Liberator bomber commanders trained in the continental United States". The pace of training is well illustrated in that it was not until 7 October 1943 that time was found for a formal dedication.

George McGovern, later a senator and candidate for President of the United States, trained as a B-24 pilot at Liberal.

On 1 May 1944 all the separate units on the field were disbanded except for the 744th AAF Band, the Airways Communications Squadron, and the Base Weather Section. In place of the disbanded organizations the several sections of the 2525th Base Unit were created, distinguished by the nature of the service performed:

Unit Headquarters.

- Section "A" administration and services.
- Section "B" training and operations.
- Section "C" supply and maintenance.
- Section "E" medical.
- Section "F" Black personnel.
- Section "H" officer students.

In February 1945 these sections were redesignated squadrons, which remained in existence until inactivation of the field. After victory in Europe the training program of Liberal Army Airfield became somewhat erratic because of the frequent changes of policy in the Training Command. However, with the surrender of the Japanese in August, the mission of the school was definitely over.

=== Inactivation ===
On 7 September 1945 the commanding officer received official orders for inactivation of the field on or before 30 September. B-24 Liberators were obsolete as the postwar Air Force would retain the Boeing B-29 Superfortress as its long-range strategic bomber. Liberal field was placed at that time on a standby status, which meant maintaining it in such condition as would make possible reactivation within thirty days. Consequently, the field's activities for the greater part of September were largely concerned with the process of inactivation. On 19 September the officer students were slated to complete training at Hondo Army Air Field where the 2523d Army Air Forces Base Unit would complete the four-engine training on B-24s transferred from Liberal.

All remaining personnel, except officers and enlisted men scheduled to form the standby cadre, were put on movement orders on 29 September. Although the majority of departments were still functioning on 1 October, they were prepared to close down within a few days. Four days later, Liberal Army Airfield was turned over to the Army's District Engineer, Seventh Service Command at Omaha, Nebraska who assumed jurisdiction over the field, pending disposition. Excess buildings and demilitarized equipment were sold or transferred to other bases. Some were torn down and sales were held for scrap lumber of torn down buildings, fence posts, barbed wire and other surplus items.

During its 27 months of actual training, Liberal Army Air Field graduated 4,468 four-engine airplane commanders. In addition, 1,025 pilots were graduated from the pre-transition course conducted for a period in the middle of 1944.

== Current status ==
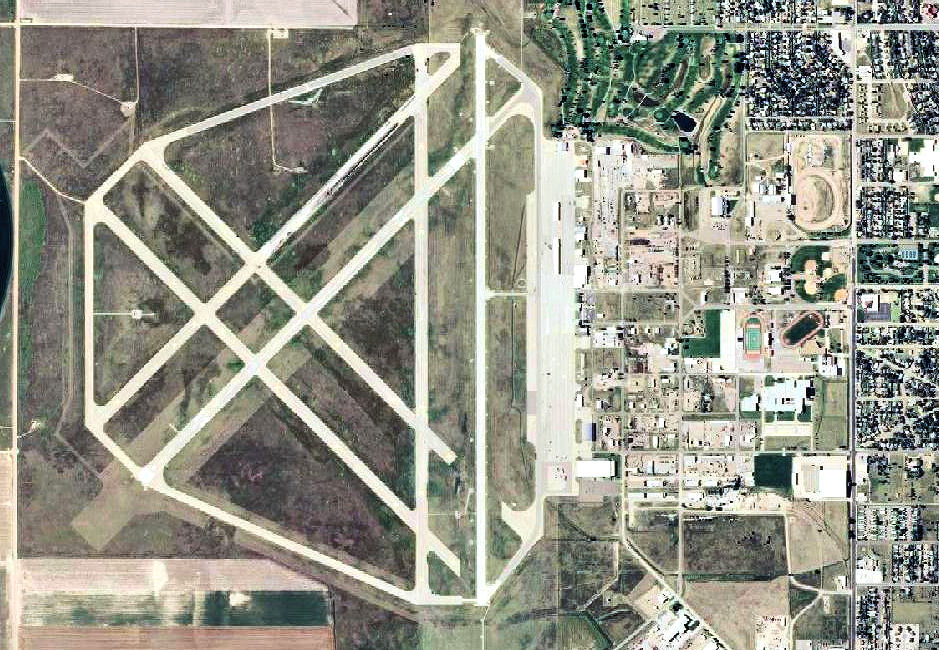
2006 USGS airphoto of the former Liberal Army Airfield

Since the end of World War II, the installation has been operated by the city of Liberal as its municipal airport. One of the runways is maintained for use primarily by general aviation, although limited commercial airline service is offered. The large airfield remains intact, with a few sections of concrete removed to limit access. The large parking apron remains, part of it used by the Mid-America Air Museum. The base station has been totally redeveloped into a light industrial park, university campus and recreation fields. Many streets remain along with the outline of the base parade ground and headquarters.

== See also ==
- Kansas World War II Army Airfields
- 34th Flying Training Wing (World War II)
