= Combat Air Museum =

Aviation museum in Kansas, United States

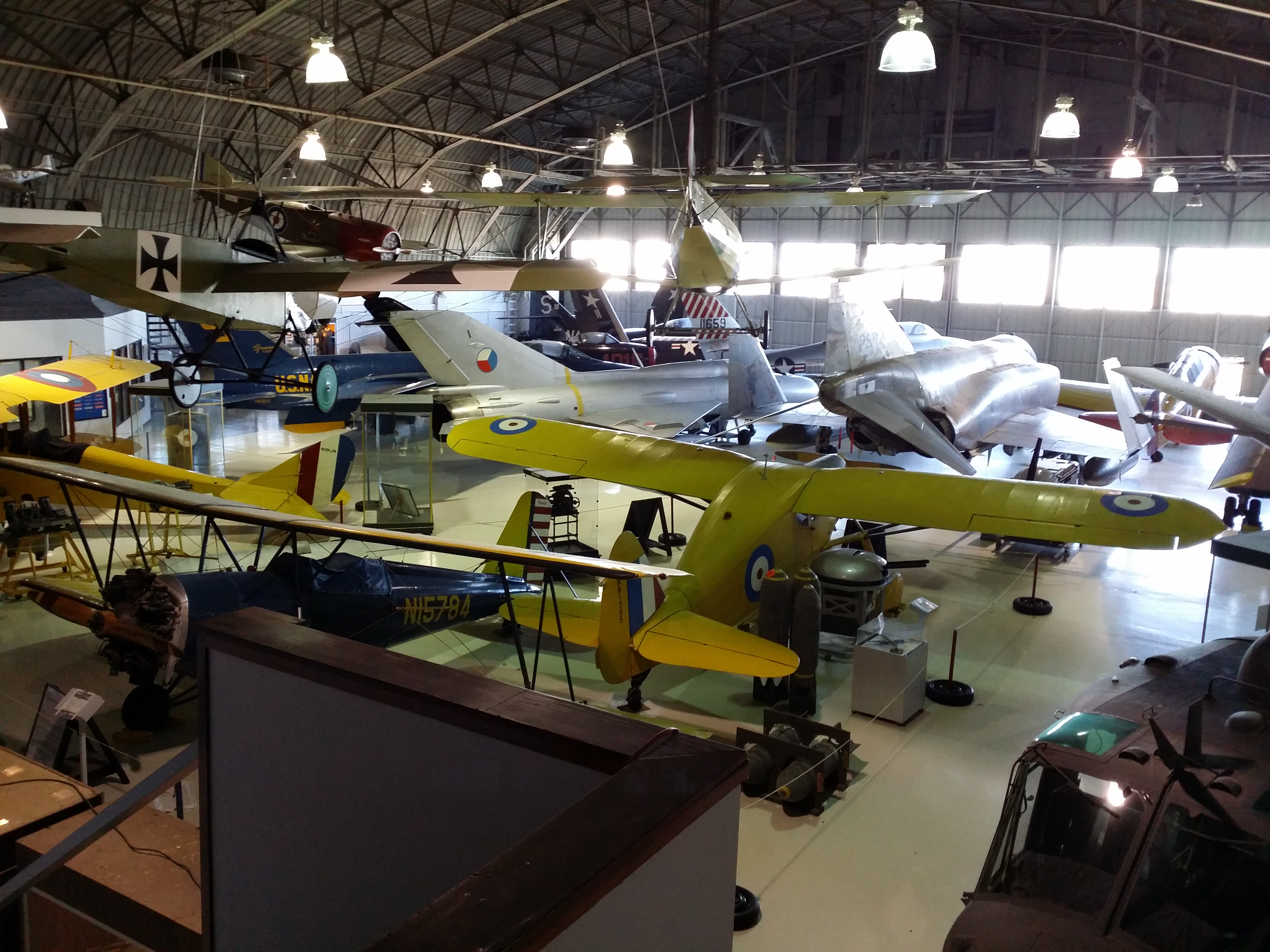
- Overview of Hangar 602

- Location within Kansas
- Established: 1976
- Location: Topeka, Kansas
- Coordinates: 38°56′28″N 95°40′40″W
- Type: Aviation museum
- Website: www.combatairmuseum.org

The Combat Air Museum is a non-profit aviation museum at Topeka Regional Airport in Topeka, Kansas, United States. The museum preserves and displays U.S. military aviation history through a collection of more than 40 historic aircraft, including World War I replicas, World War II trainers, Cold War jets, and helicopters. In addition to its aircraft, the museum features aviation artifacts, educational programs, and exhibits on regional and national military aviation heritage.

== History ==
The Combat Air Museum was established in the fall of 1976 as the Kansas Wing of David Tallichet's Yesterday's Air Force (YAF), a private collection dedicated to preserving military aviation history. (Note: The organization had selected the site about ten years prior due to the amount of space available.) The organization's first aircraft was a B-24 named Delectable Doris. It moved to Hangar 626 and opened in July 1977. By 1979, the group reorganized as the Combat Air Museum and relocated to Hangar 602 at Forbes Field in Topeka, Kansas.

The museum explored the possibility of establishing a wing in Wichita in early 1981. Later that year, it partnered with the AirCraft Enthusiasts Society (ACES) to propose an aviation museum in the city.

The museum's "Detachment 1" operated at the Augusta Municipal Airport in 1991.

The museum attempted to acquire an RB-47 named City of Salina from the Salina Airport in 1991 after the airport sought a new home for it. (Note: The aircraft eventually went on display at the National Museum of the United States Air Force.)

A 60 ft (18 m) tower that had been built as a memorial to World War II veterans was re-erected at the museum in 1993. (Note: It had been located on the Kansas Free Fair grounds, but was torn down in the late 1970s and the parts sold.)

The board of directors decided to no longer fly the museum's aircraft in April 1996 due to a lack of insurance.

An O-47 that was on loan to the museum was sold by its owner in 2014.

The museum added three bays to display additional artifacts in 2025. A temporary exhibition of art featuring the Red Baron was announced in July 2025.

== Collection ==
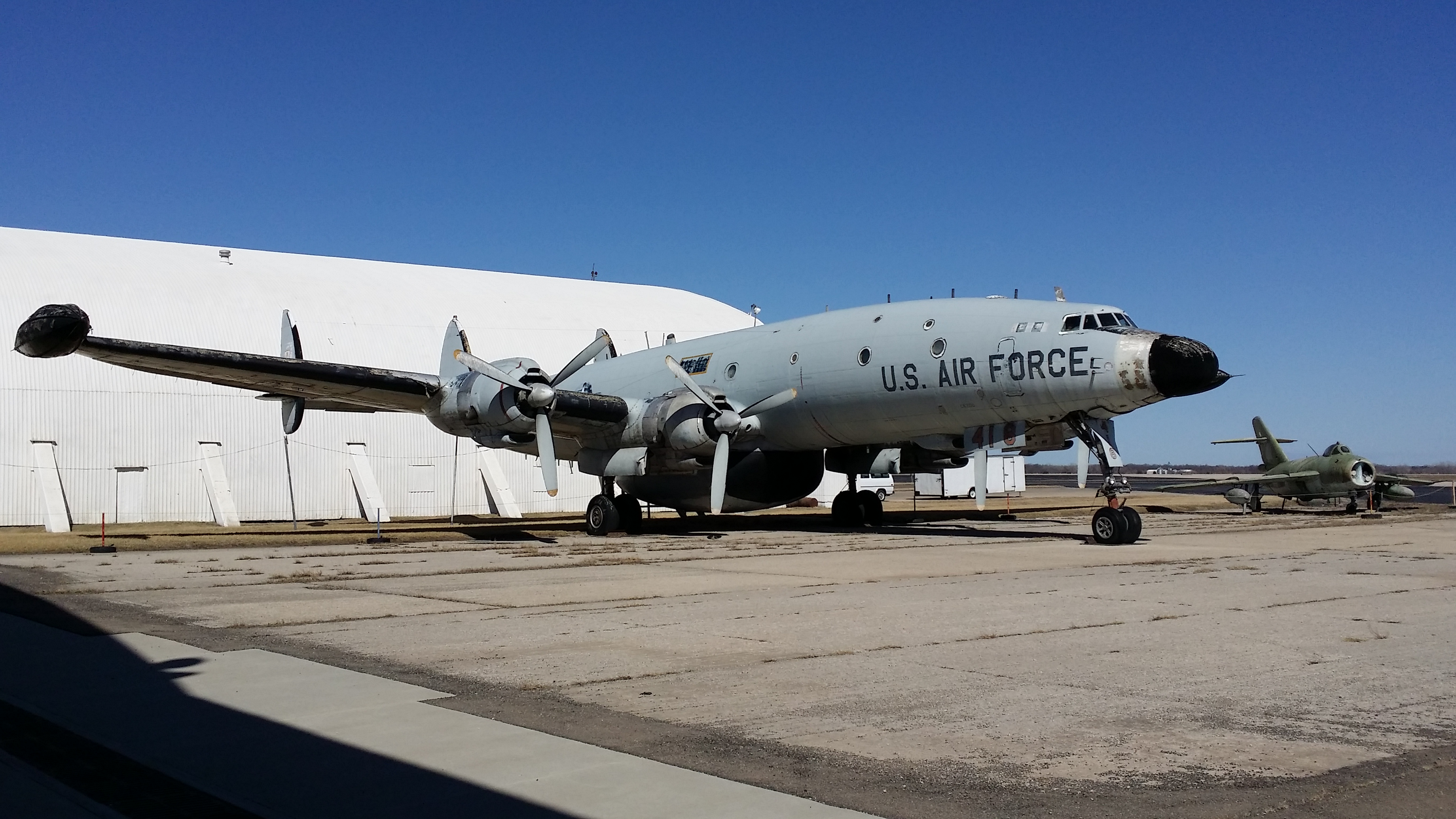
EC-121T in March 2014

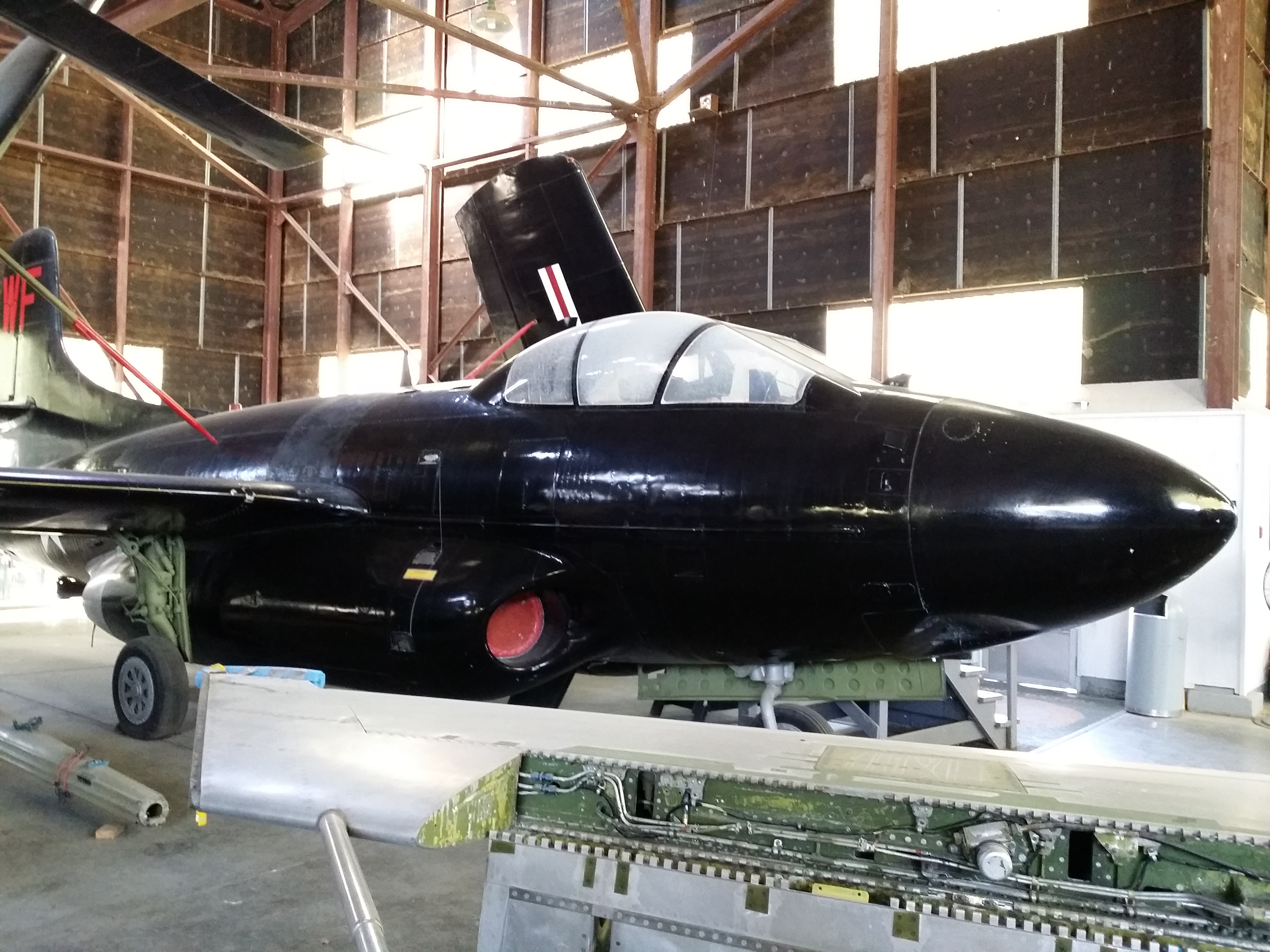
F3D-2 in March 2014

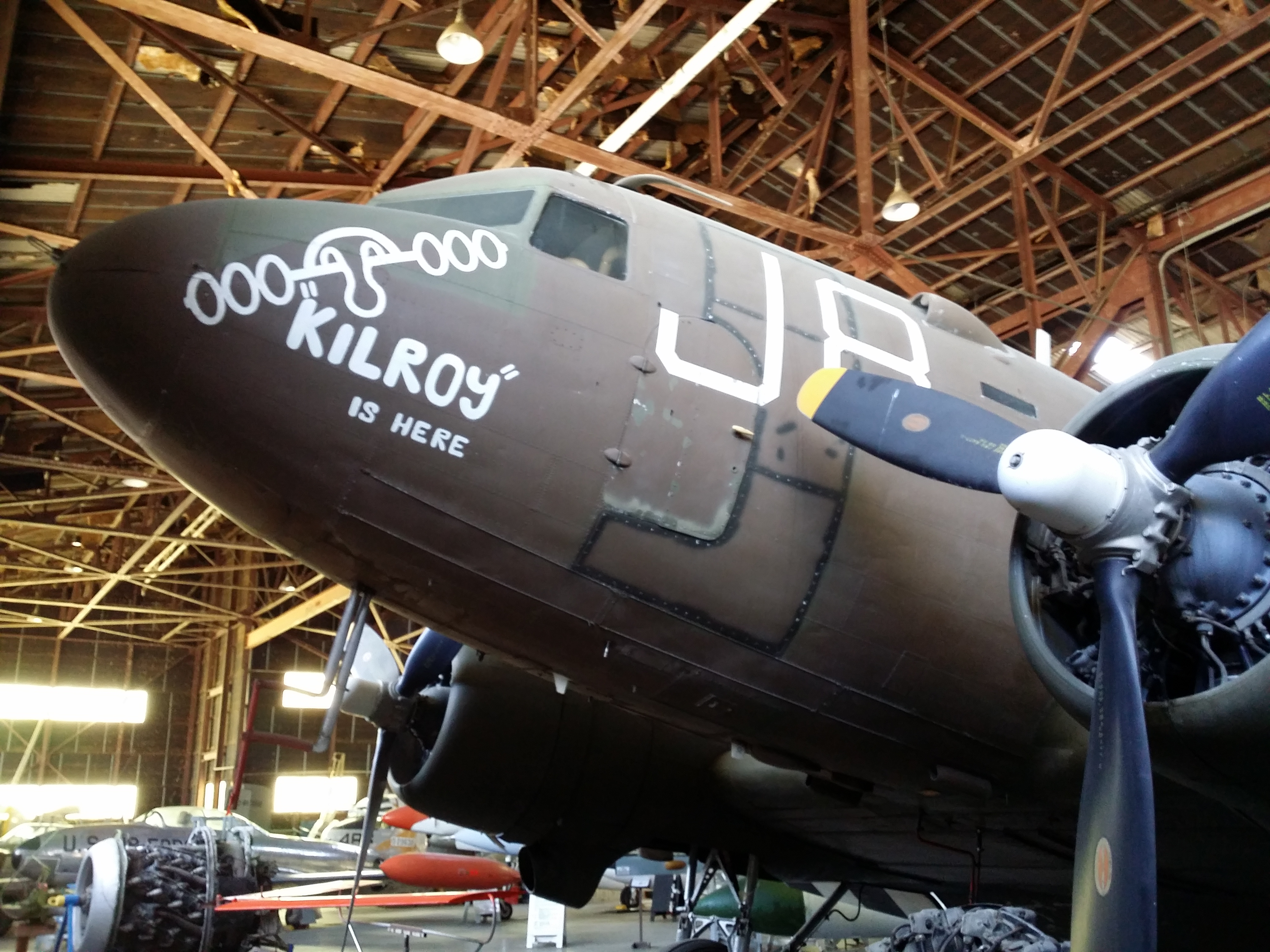
C-47D in March 2014

The museums collection includes more than 40 aircraft ranging from World War I replicas to Cold War-era jets and helicopters, illustrating the evolution of U.S. military aviation.

The collection includes:

=== Aircraft ===
- Airco DH-2 – replica
- Beech RU-8D Seminole
- Beech SNB-5
- Bell UH-1H Iroquois
- Bell UH-1M Iroquois
- Boeing CH-47 Chinook
- Cessna AT-17 Bobcat
- Curtiss JN-4D – replica
- Douglas C-47D Skytrain "Kilroy"
- Douglas F3D-2 Skyknight
- Douglas TA-4J Skyhawk
- Etrich Taube – scale replica
- Fairchild UC-61K Forwarder
- Fokker Dr.I – replica
- Fokker E.IV – replica
- Grumman F9F-5 Panther
- Grumman F11F-1 Tiger
- Grumman F-14A Tomcat
- Grumman US-2A Tracker
- Hiller OH-23A Raven – under reconstruction
- Lockheed EC-121T Warning Star
- Lockheed T-33A Shooting Star
- McDonnell F-101B Voodoo
- McDonnell F-4D Phantom II
- McDonnell Douglas F-15 Eagle
- Messerschmitt Bf 109 G-10 – scale mockup
- Meyers OTW Serial #1
- Mikoyan-Gurevich MiG-21PF
- Nieuport 27 – flying replica
- North American F-86H Sabre
- North American Harvard IV
- Pfalz E.I – scale replica
- PZL-Mielec Lim-2
- PZL-Mielec Lim-6R
- Republic F-84F Thunderstreak
- Republic F-105D Thunderchief
- Royal Aircraft Factory S.E.5 – replica
- Sikorsky CH-53A Sea Stallion
- Sikorsky CH-54B Tarhe
- Sopwith Scout – full-scale replica
- Vultee BT-13 Valiant

=== Other ===
- MMIST CQ-10 Snowgoose
- Ryan BQM-34 Firebee

== Events ==
The museum held an annual airshow called Superbatics from 1976 to at least 1995.

The museum holds an annual 5k run/walk fundraiser.

== See also ==
- Cosmosphere in Hutchinson
- Kansas Aviation Museum in Wichita
- Mid-America Air Museum in Liberal
- Kansas World War II army airfields
- List of aerospace museums
- List of museums in Kansas
