= Liberal Mid-America Regional Airport =

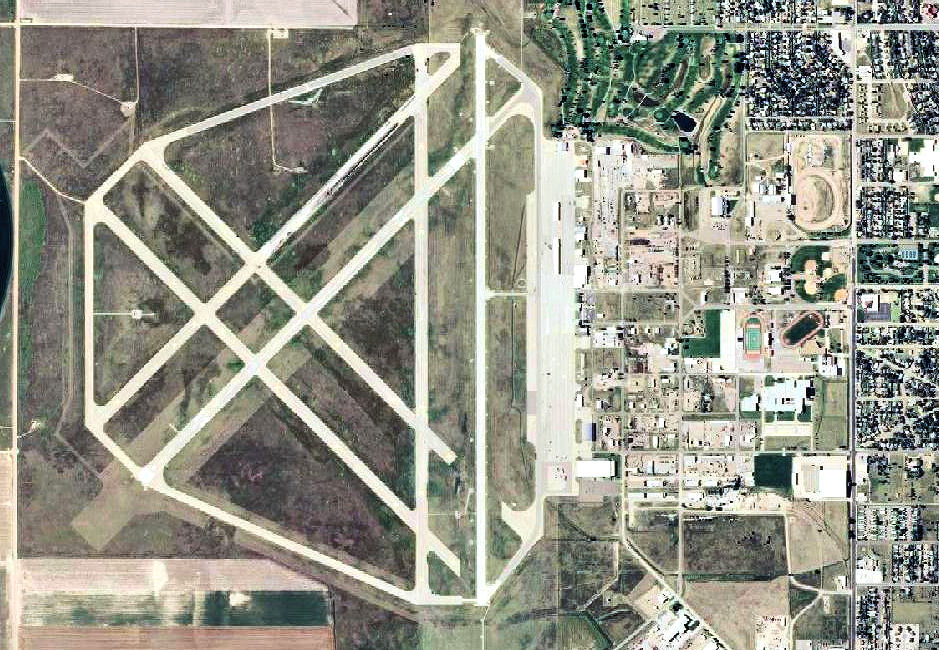
- USGS 2006 orthophoto
- IATA: LBL; ICAO: KLBL; FAA LID: LBL

Summary
- Airport type: Public
- Owner: City of Liberal
- Serves: Liberal, Kansas
- Elevation AMSL: 2,885 ft (879 m)
- Coordinates: 37°02′39″N 100°57′36″W
- Website: Airport website

Map
- Location of airport in Kansas / United States LBL (the United States)

Runways
Direction	Length		Surface
Direction	ft	m	Surface
4/22	5,000	1,524	Concrete
17/35	7,105	2,166	Concrete

Statistics (2022)
- Aircraft operations: 42,640
- Based aircraft: 45
- Source: Federal Aviation Administration

Liberal Mid-America Regional Airport (IATA: LBL, ICAO: KLBL, FAA LID: LBL) is two miles west of Liberal, in Seward County, Kansas. It is used for general aviation and is subsidized by the Essential Air Service program. Formerly Liberal Municipal Airport, it hosts the Mid-America Air Museum.

The Federal Aviation Administration says this airport had 7,911 passenger boardings (enplanements) in calendar year 2008, 6,255 in 2009 and 7,156 in 2010. The National Plan of Integrated Airport Systems for 2011–2015 categorized it as a non-primary commercial service airport.

== History ==
During World War II, the facility was Liberal Army Airfield and was used for United States Army Air Forces Second Air Force B-24 Liberator training from 1943 to 1945. New multi-engine graduates were shipped to Liberal to transition to the Liberator, then sent to 1st Phase bases to join a crew for combat training.

Before April 1944, Liberal was home to a Twin Engine Flying Training Group with four squadrons (60, 63, 1029, 1030), the 527th Base Hq & Air Base Sq, 324th Sub Depot, 444th (later 744th) AAF Band, and 396th Aviation Sq.

These units later merged into the 2425th AAF Base Unit (Pilot School, Specialized, Four Engine).

Airline flights (on Central Airlines DC-3s) began in 1956; successor Frontier Airlines left in 1981.

== Facilities ==
The airport covers 2,005 acres (811 ha) at an elevation of 2,885 feet (879 m). It has two concrete runways: 4/22 is 5,000 by 75 feet (1,524 x 23 m) and 17/35 is 7,105 by 100 feet (2,166 x 30 m).

In 2022, the airport had 42,640 aircraft operations, an average of 117 per day: 94% general aviation, 3% airline, 3% air taxi, and <1% military. 45 aircraft were then based at this airport: 28 single-engine, 12 multi-engine, 4 jet and 1 glider.

The Mid-America Air Museum is located on the airport.

== Airline and destinations ==
United Express connects Liberal Airport to Denver International Airport and Dodge City Regional Airport.

Destinations map
Destinations from Liberal Mid-America Regional Airport

=== Statistics ===
Carrier shares (April 2021 - March 2022)
Carrier	Passengers (arriving and departing)
Skywest Airlines	14,300(100%)

Top domestic destinations (April 2021 - March 2022)
Rank	Airport	Passengers	Airline
1	Denver International (DEN)	7,170	United

== See also ==
- List of airports in Kansas

== Other sources ==
- Essential Air Service documents (Docket DOT-OST-1998-3498) from the U.S. Department of Transportation:
  - Order 2009-9-5 (September 11, 2009): re-selecting Great Lakes Aviation, Ltd., to provide essential air service (EAS) at Dodge City, Garden City, Great Bend, Hays, and Liberal for the two-year period from October 1, 2009, through September 30, 2011, at combined annual subsidy rates of $8,897,565. Liberal, Kansas: Docket OST-1998-3498. Effective Period: October 1, 2009, through September 30, 2011. Scheduled Service: 18 nonstop round trips per week to Denver. Aircraft: Beech 1900, 19 seats.
  - Order 2011-10-24 (October 31, 2011): re-selecting Great Lakes Aviation, Ltd., to provide essential air service (EAS) at Liberal for $2,555,150 annual subsidy. Effective Period: Two year period beginning when American Eagle begins full EAS (at Garden City) through the 24th month thereafter. Liberal: 18 nonstop round trips per week to Denver with Beech 1900 aircraft.
  - Order 2014-3-9 (March 14, 2014): re-selects Great Lakes Airlines at Dodge City and Liberal, Kansas. Liberal, Kansas: Docket 1998-3498; Effective Period: May 1, 2014, through July 31, 2016; Service: Eighteen (18) nonstop round trips per week to Denver (DEN); Aircraft Type: Beech 1900; Annual Subsidy: $2,236,180.
