= Meyers Aircraft Company =

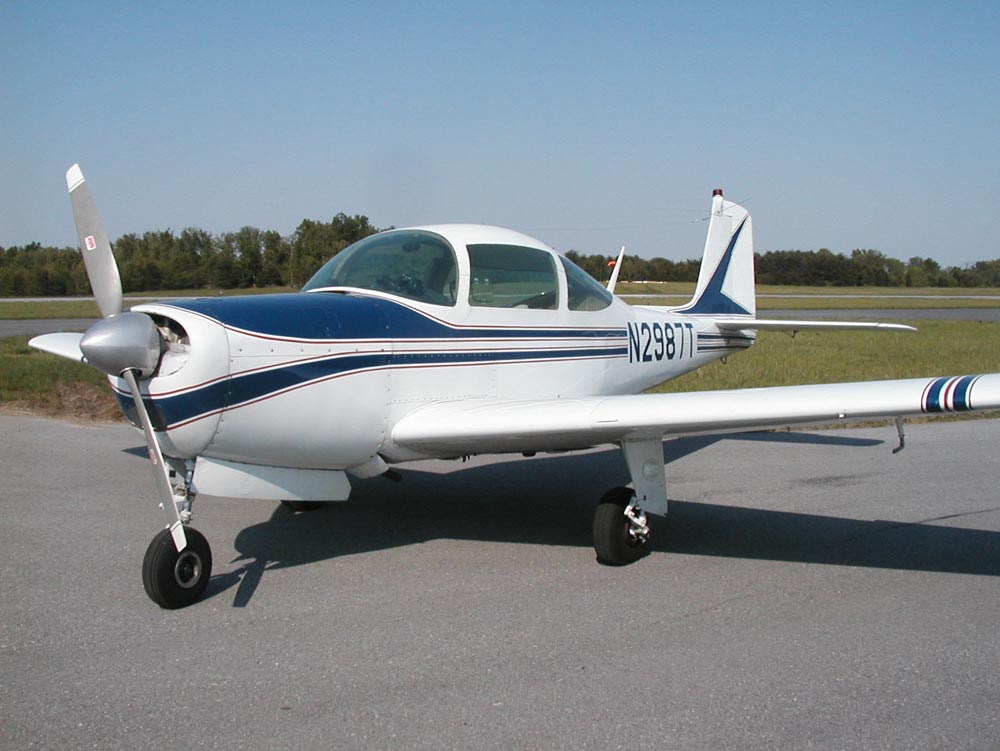
- A Meyers 200D
- Industry: Aerospace
- Founded: 1936
- Founders: Allen H. Meyers
- Defunct: 1965
- Fate: Acquired by Aero Commander

The Meyers Aircraft Company was a US aircraft manufacturer established by Al Meyers in Tecumseh, Michigan, in 1936 at what is now Meyers–Diver's Airport.

== History ==
Originally, the company produced a biplane trainer, the Meyers OTW, but after World War II developed a range of light utility aircraft, culminating in the Meyers 200. In 1965, the company and the rights to two of its aircraft, the 145 and 200 were purchased by the Aero Commander Division of Rockwell-Standard.

=== Post-acquisition ===
In 1977, a company in Denver bought the tooling and rights to the Meyers 200 and attempted to put it back into production. By 1994, the type certificate for the MAC-145 was owned by a company in Fayetteville, North Carolina. By 1996, a company called the New Meyers Aircraft Company had started construction on a new factory in Fort Pierce, Florida. The company planned to build a development of the MAC-145 called the SP20.

== Aircraft ==
Model name	First flight	Number built	Type
Meyers OTW	1936	104	Training biplane
Meyers Me-165W	1942	1	CPTP Trainer
Meyers MAC-145	1947	22	Sports aircraft
Meyers 200	1955	129	Light cabin aircraft
