= Interceptor Corporation =

Interceptor Corporation was a US firm founded in Norman, Oklahoma to develop and market a turboprop-powered version of the Meyers 200, known as the Interceptor 400. It acquired the rights to the Meyers 200 after the North American Rockwell merger in 1967. In the early 1970s, the market was not yet ready for a turboprop-powered single-engine aircraft; the company failed after experiencing liquidity issues. Rights to all aircraft were eventually acquired by Prop-Jets Inc in 1982.
