= Civilian Pilot Training Program =

American government flight training program

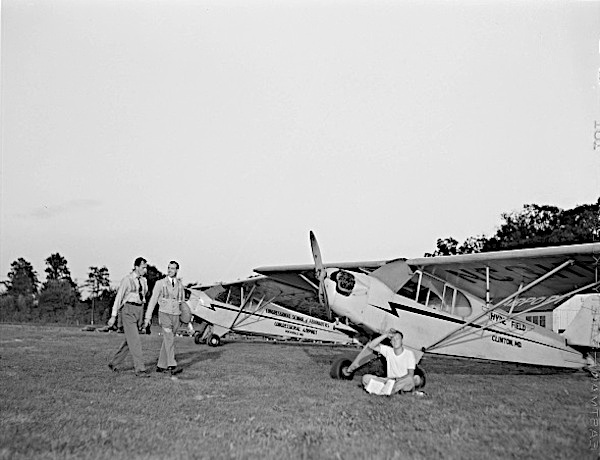
Student fliers with Piper J-3s under the Civilian Pilot Training Program. Congressional Airport. Rockville, Maryland

The Civilian Pilot Training Program (CPTP) was a flight training program (1938–1944) sponsored by the United States government with the stated purpose of increasing the number of civilian pilots, though having a clear impact on military preparedness.

== Establishment ==
In the years immediately preceding World War II, several European countries, particularly Italy and Nazi Germany, began training thousands of young people to become pilots. Purportedly civilian in nature, these European government-sponsored programs were, in fact, nothing more than clandestine military flight training academies.

In October 1938, General Henry H. "Hap" Arnold brought in the top three aviation school representatives to request they establish an unfunded startup of CPTP schools at their own risk. These were Oliver Parks of Parks Air College, C. C. Moseley of the Curtiss-Wright Technical Institute, and Theophilus Lee Jr. of the Boeing School of Aeronautics; all agreed to start work. The Civil Aeronautics Authority Act of 1938 formed the Civil Aeronautics Authority headed by Robert H. Hinckley. The act contained language authorizing and funding a trial program for what would evolve into the Civilian Pilot Training Program (CPTP), as run by the CAA. President Franklin D. Roosevelt unveiled the program on December 27, 1938, announcing at a White House press conference that he had signed off on a proposal to provide a needed boost to general aviation by providing pilot training to 20,000 college students a year.

Following the precedent established in Europe, the CPTP was established as a civilian program, but its potential for national defense was undisguised. The program started in 1939 with two laws passed by Congress in April and June, with the government paying for a 72-hour ground school course followed by 35 to 50 hours of flight instruction at facilities located near eleven colleges and universities. It was an unqualified success and provided a grand vision for its supporters – to greatly expand the nation's civilian pilot population by training thousands of college students to fly.

A joint publication released in 1970 by the Department of Transportation and the Federal Aviation Administration recounts the historical success of the CPTP, stating the program "was planned originally as an experiment in vocational training." The intent was to boost industry and aviation manufacturing, with the "added benefit to the Armed Services building a reserve of knowledgeable pilots." It began in 1939 with 13 colleges and 330 students, and by the summer of 1944 had grown to incorporate 1,132 educational institutions and 435,165 qualified trainees – including several hundred women, all of whom had been qualified by 1,460 contractors. Members of the CPTP became an impetus of innovation which transformed United States history, long after World War II. Their efforts proved the necessity for a radical departure from conventional thinking, when required, to preserve failing sectors of industry and become a vital adjunct to national defense.

== Controversy ==
External image
- Map of CPTP Schools in 1940

The military establishment was initially unenthusiastic about the CPTP concept, quite unimpressed by any program initiated and administered by civilians. Congress, too, was split along mostly party lines as to the value of the CPTP. Isolationists branded the program as provocative saber-rattling that threatened the nation's neutrality; others slammed it as a pork barrel waste of tax dollars, while supporters touted the positive impacts on the aviation industry and the defense value of a vastly enlarged base of trained pilots.

After the Nazi invasion of Poland on September 1, 1939, triggered World War II, the military value of the CPTP became obvious, even to the program's detractors. The United States started to evaluate its ability to fight an air war and the results were appalling. Pilots, instructors, and training aircraft were all in short supply. Acknowledging the shortage of trained pilots, both the Army Air Corps and Navy reluctantly waived certain “elimination” courses for CPTP graduates and allowed them to proceed directly into pilot training.

The Army Air Corps deemed the situation to be so grave it proposed that private aviation be suspended and all pilot training (most notably the CPTP) be brought under the control of the military. The December 13, 1940, issue of American Aviation Daily carried this account of the Army's intentions:

Preliminary plans are understood to be already drafted by the Army to ground all private flying in the United States for the duration of the national emergency...The Army will take over all training (including CPTP).

The Army's proposal met with stiff resistance. Just two weeks after the American Aviation Daily article appeared, 83 companies with a vested interest in general aviation organized the National Aviation Training Association (NATA). NATA members recognized that, if left unchallenged, the Army plan would, for all practical purposes, ban private aircraft from U.S. skies. The NATA and other aviation interests blunted the Army's bid with an effective lobbying campaign in Congress. Their actions not only saved the CPTP, they may have saved the entire general aviation industry in the United States.

== Buildup ==
The result was a revitalized CPTP and an expansion of its curriculum to a larger segment of the nation's colleges and universities. In May 1939 the first nine schools were selected, nine more were added in August 1940 (as the Battle of Britain was raging), 11 more in March 1941, and 15 more by October 1941 – four months after the formation of the USAAF – and just two months before the United States' entry into World War II. By the program's peak, 1,132 educational institutions and 1,460 flight schools were participating in the CPTP. Institutions such as the University of Michigan; University of Virginia; University of Washington; Georgia Institute of Technology; Pomona College; San Jose State Teachers College; and the Tuskegee Institute, all included the CPTP in their curricula. (See References below to access complete list of educational institutions participating in the CPTP.)

The inclusion of Tuskegee University in the ranks of CPTP participants, along with Hampton University, Virginia State University, Delaware State University, and Howard University, helped open the doors for the first African-American military pilots. The onset of World War II and political pressure combined to compel the U.S. Army Air Corps – as it was known before June 20, 1941 – to employ African-Americans as officers and pilots, with the majority of its personnel being graduates of the CPTP.

The decision to train civilian pilots also produced an unexpected, but welcome, side effect on the general aviation industry. As it turned out, the United States faced just as large a shortage of training aircraft as it did civilian pilots. The federal Civil Aeronautics Authority (predecessor of the Federal Aviation Administration) regulations required a CPTP-participating flight school to own one aircraft for every ten students enrolled in the program.

Furthermore, the requirements specified for these aircraft narrowed down the field to only several models in production at that time, with most flight schools preferring the tandem-seat configuration of the Piper Cub. Seizing the opportunity unexpectedly thrust upon them, several light aircraft manufacturers quickly filled the market void with CPTP-compatible aircraft of their own, such as the WACO UPF-7 and the Meyers OTW biplane. Aeronca and Taylorcraft also produced tandem versions of their existing side-by-side seating high-winged monoplanes, each of which would lead to their own military equivalents.

== War Training Service ==
After the attack on Pearl Harbor and the U.S. entrance into World War II, the CPTP changed forever, including the name. The Civilian Pilot Training Program became the War Training Service (WTS), or Civil Aeronautics Authority (CAA) War Training Service and, from 1942 to 1944, served primarily as the screening program for potential pilot candidates. Students still attended classes at colleges and universities and flight training was still conducted by private flight schools, but all WTS graduates were required to sign a contract agreeing to enter the military following graduation. There is a list of colleges and universities participating in the CPTP in '43–'44 in the appendix of "They Flew Proud".

The CPTP/WTS program was largely phased out in the summer of 1944, but not before 435,165 people, including hundreds of women and African-Americans, had been taught to fly. Notable legends trained under the CPTP include: Astronaut/Senator John Glenn, top Navy ace Alexander Vraciu, Douglas test pilot Robert Rahn, top World War II ace Major Richard Bong, triple ace Bud Anderson, future Senator and presidential candidate George McGovern, WASP Dora Dougherty Strother and Tuskegee airman Major Robert W. Deiz. The CPTP admirably achieved its primary mission, best expressed by the title of aviation historian Dominick Pisano's book, To Fill the Skies with Pilots.

Two of the largest CPT/WTS schools were Piedmont Aviation, operated by Tom Davis, and Southern Airways, operated by Frank W. Hulse. Piedmont's school was based in Winston-Salem, North Carolina, while Southern had schools in Charlotte, North Carolina, Greenville and Camden, South Carolina, and in Birmingham and Decatur, Alabama. Both companies trained over 60,000 war pilots including young men from Brazil (Piedmont) and a large number of Royal Air Force pilots from England (Southern). By 1947 Davis had turned his school into Piedmont Airlines with scheduled passenger flights between North Carolina and Ohio. In 1949, Hulse had Southern Airways flying commercial service between Jacksonville, Florida and Memphis, Tennessee, and between Atlanta and Charlotte. Both airlines began operations with war surplus Douglas DC-3 aircraft that were modified for commercial service in their former CPT/WTS maintenance hangars.

One of the few women instructors in the CPTP later wrote about her experiences. With the threat of war rising on the horizon, Opal Kunz renewed her pilot's license after taking a refresher course at Hagerstown, Maryland, and began teaching aviation students at the Arkansas State College (now Arkansas State University). She later moved to Rhode Island, and at the start of World War II became an instructor at the Rhode Island State Airport Terminal for Navy cadets and the government sponsored “Civilian Pilot Training Program (CPTP)” during the war, teaching over 400 young men how to fly for the Air Corps. This was her old dream of the Betsy Ross Air Corps come true, as she helped train the men who would fly fighter aircraft in combat. An account from the time shows the work she was doing by saying: “Mrs. Kunz has been in Providence since January [1942] as a member of the staff of E.W. Wiggins Airways. She has a mother’s confidence in her ‘boys’ and they reciprocate with respect and enthusiasm. Nothing gives her greater joy than to see them solo, to know she has taken them one step nearer to Uncle Sam's aerial defense line.” Later, at her home in California, she would recall her experiences with fondness. “I trained about 400 boys and it was easily the highlight of my career. I really became a sort of foster mother to them. You would be surprised how many of my boys brought their wives and children to see me after the war.” She also indicated in a letter that she had trained combat pilots. "...I was a flight instructor all during the war. Had over three hundred students who served as combat pilots in the war.”

Several CPTP graduates, including Betty Tackaberry Blake, Florence Shutsy-Reynolds and Betty Jane Williams, went on to serve as a Women Airforce Service Pilot (WASP).

== See also ==
- Aviation Cadet Training Program (USAAF)
- British Commonwealth Air Training Plan
- German Air Sports Association (started 1933)
- V-5 Naval Aviation Cadet Program

== Bibliography ==
- Birch, Jane Gardner. "Events and Book Excerpt". They Flew Proud. The excerpt page has a complete list (by state) of the educational institutions that participated in the Civilian Pilot training Program.
- Craft, Stephen G. (2010). Embry-Riddle at War: Aviation Training during World War II. University Press of Florida. ISBN 978-0-8130-3503-1.
- Guillemette, Roger. "Civilian Pilot Training Program (CPTP)". U.S. Centennial of Flight Commission.
- Harlan, John C. (February 1965). Early Aeronautics Program at West Virginia State College (PDF) (Report). Institute, West Virginia: West Virginia State College.
- Pisano, Dominick A. (1993). To Fill the Skies with Pilots: the Civilian Pilot Training Program, 1939–46. Urbana: University of Illinois Press. ISBN 0252019946.
- Strickland, Patricia. The Putt-Putt Air Force: The Story of the Civilian Pilot Training Program and the War Training Service (1939–1944). Department of Transportation.
- Weatherford, David Lenton (1993), Route of the Aristocrats: The History of Southern Airways, Center for the Study of Southern Culture (University of Mississippi) This is a master's thesis.
- Wiener, Willard (1945). Two Hundred Thousand Flyers: The Story of the Civilian-AAF Pilot Training Program. Washington: The Infantry Journal.
- Williams, Edwin L. (November 1956). History of the Air Force Civilian Training Program, 1941–1951 (PDF) (Report). USAF Historical Studies. Maxwell Air Force Base: USAF Historical Division.
