= Meyers MAC-145 =

MAC-125 and MAC-145
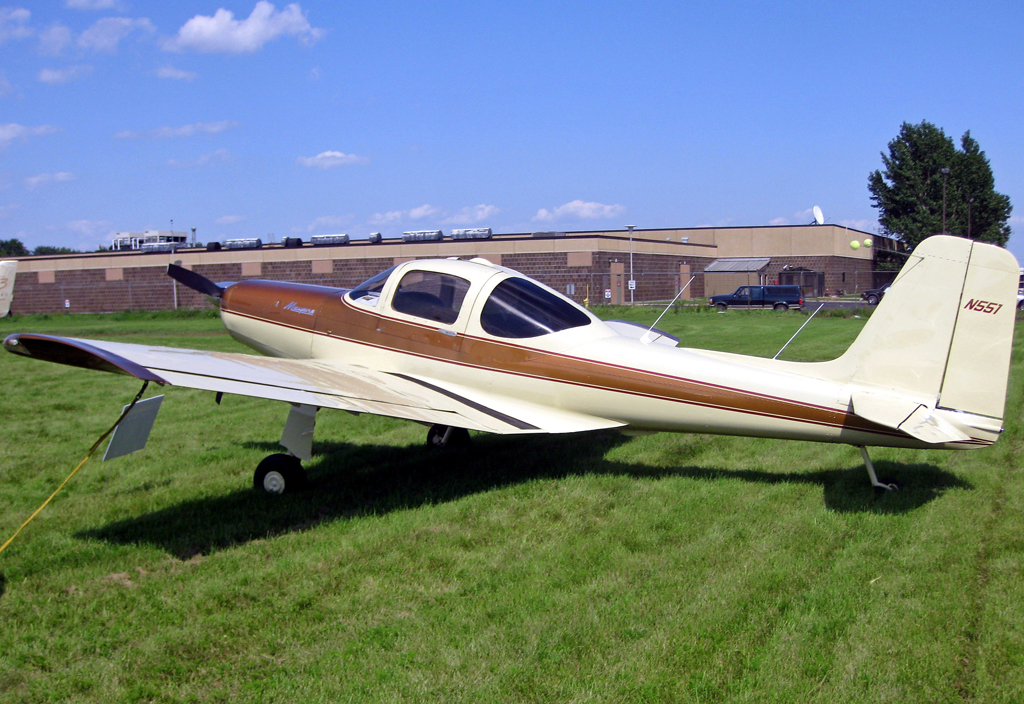
- 1954-built Meyers 145 at the 2010 EAA fly-in at Oshkosh, Wisconsin

General information
- Type: Sport aircraft
- National origin: United States
- Manufacturer: Meyers
- Designer: Al Meyers
- Number built: 22

History
- First flight: 1947

The Meyers MAC-125 is a light sport aircraft developed in the United States in 1947, produced in a small series as the MAC-145.

== Design and development ==
The basic design, common to both models, was that of a low-wing cantilever monoplane of all-metal construction with side-by-side seating for two in a fully enclosed cabin. The main gear wheels of the undercarriage were retractable, and the tailwheel was steerable. The aircraft structure incorporated a framework built up of welded steel tube which extended lengthwise from the engine firewall to the rear of the cabin, and spanwise from one undercarriage well to the other. Around this framework was a conventional, monocoque fuselage. The MAC-125 was powered by a single 125-hp engine while the MAC-145 production model had a 145-hp engine instead and a larger tail fin.

The first prototype was lost during spin testing for certification while being flown by Al Meyers. Meyers parachuted to safety, sustaining a broken ankle, and although the aircraft was destroyed, its steel inner structure was salvaged and used to build the second prototype. Certification was subsequently successfully achieved with this aircraft.

== Production and operations ==
Only twenty MAC-145s were built, each to a specific customer order, a business strategy that insulated the Meyers company from the poor market conditions that bankrupted many small American aircraft manufacturers in the late 1940s. Production continued until 1955 when the larger, 4-seat Meyers 200 was certified and began production. The Meyers Aircraft Company was acquired by the Aero Commander division of Rockwell International in 1965. The type was never produced by Rockwell, and the design again changed hands as part of the Meyers package when sold to Interceptor Corporation in 1968 and subsequently to Prop-Jets Inc in 1982.

The MAC-145 type certificate was subsequently acquired by the Seminole Tribe of Florida, who flew a highly modified version of the design in 1997 as the Micco SP20. The SP20 is powered by a 200 hp (150 kW) Textron Lycoming IO-360 engine, with other major changes including a new sliding bubble cockpit canopy, a modified tail and wing centre-section, and a retractable tailwheel. The SP26 is a more powerful aerobatic version powered by a 260 hp (190 kW) Textron Lycoming IO-540 engine. The SP20 was certified on January 15, 2000, with certification of the SP26 following on October 19, 2000. Micco claimed orders for over 50 aircraft by the end of 2000, but a slowdown in demand resulted in production being suspended late in 2002, with the Micco business being sold to Lanshe Aerospace of Fort Pierce, Florida in February 2003. Financial problems caused production to be stopped in April 2004. By this time, eight SP20s and 11 SP26s had been built by Micco and Lanshe.

Examples of Meyers-built MAC-145s are still active in 2011.

== Variants ==
- MAC-125 - prototypes with Continental C125 engine (2 built)
- MAC-145 - production version with Continental C145 engine (20 built)

== Specifications (MAC-145) ==
Data from Jane's All The World's Aircraft 1951–52

General characteristics

- Crew: 1
- Capacity: 1 passenger
- Length: 21 ft 4 in (6.50 m)
- Wingspan: 30 ft 0 in (9.14 m)
- Height: 8 ft 6 in (2.59 m)
- Wing area: 149 sq ft (13.8 m^{2})
- Empty weight: 1,135 lb (515 kg)
- Gross weight: 1,735 lb (787 kg)
- Fuel capacity: 30 US gal (25 imp gal; 110 L)
- Powerplant: 1 × Continental C-145-2 6-cylinder air-cooled horizontally-opposed piston engine, 145 hp (108 kW)

Performance

- Maximum speed: 166 mph (267 km/h, 144 kn)
- Cruise speed: 145 mph (233 km/h, 126 kn)
- Range: 600 mi (970 km, 520 nmi) with max fuel
- Service ceiling: 18,000 ft (5,500 m)
- Rate of climb: 960 ft/min (4.9 m/s)

== See also ==
Related development

- Meyers 200
