= Meyers 200 =

Single-engined retractable-gear light aircraft

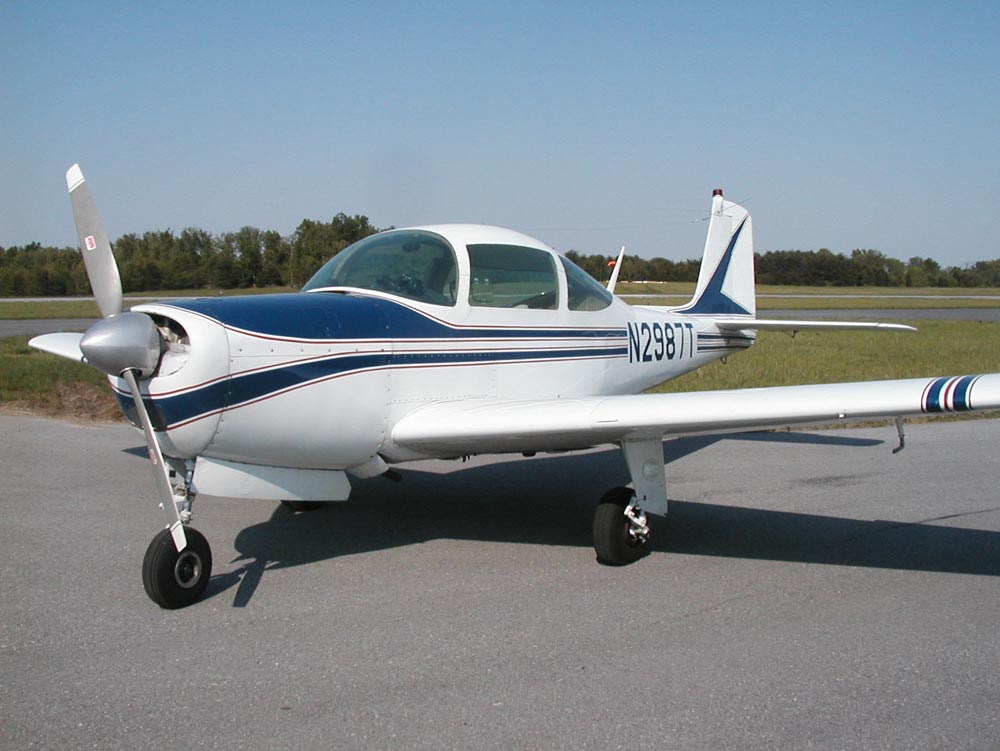
- A 1966-built Aero Commander 200D

General information
- National origin: United States of America
- Manufacturer: Meyers Aircraft Company

History
- Introduction date: 1955

The Meyers 200 is a single-engined light aircraft produced in the United States in the 1950s and 1960s.

== Design ==
It was the brainchild of Al Meyers and was a development of his Meyers MAC-145 design. The holder of a number of speed records in its class, the Meyers 200 is widely admired for its clean lines, and is also known for its exceptionally sturdy airframe. This strength is derived from a tubular 4130 chrome-moly steel truss structure with aluminum skin that protects occupants.

=== Acquisition by Aero Commander ===
In 1966, the Aero Commander division of North American Rockwell purchased the rights to the Meyers 145 and 200, as part of a strategy to capture a share of the light aircraft market in the United States. Known briefly as the Aero Commander 200, it soon emerged that the firm could not produce the design economically. Meyers' firm had been virtually hand-building each aircraft and no jigs or tooling for the kind of mass production envisaged by Aero Commander even existed at the time the rights were bought. Having spent US$4 million to produce just US$3 million worth of product, Aero Commander ceased production in 1968 and sold the rights to the Interceptor Corporation, which developed a turboprop-powered version as the Interceptor 400. Ownership of the rights eventually passed to Prop-Jets, Inc., later known as Interceptor Aircraft Corporation. In 2014 the Global Parts Group, via a separately formed affiliate company called Interceptor Aviation Inc, purchased the rights along with all associated assets and intellectual property related to the Meyers 200 and Interceptor 400 model aircraft.

== Operational service ==
The Meyers 200D has never had an in-flight structural failure and has never had a Federal Aviation Administration mandated Airworthiness Directive (AD) issued against the airframe. The 4130 chrome-moly steel tubular roll cage and understructure act like a race car protective cage during a crash. Several Meyers aircraft have been forced down in the trees and off airport runways with documented instances of the occupants walking away with only minor injuries or a broken bone.

== Variants ==
=== Meyers ===
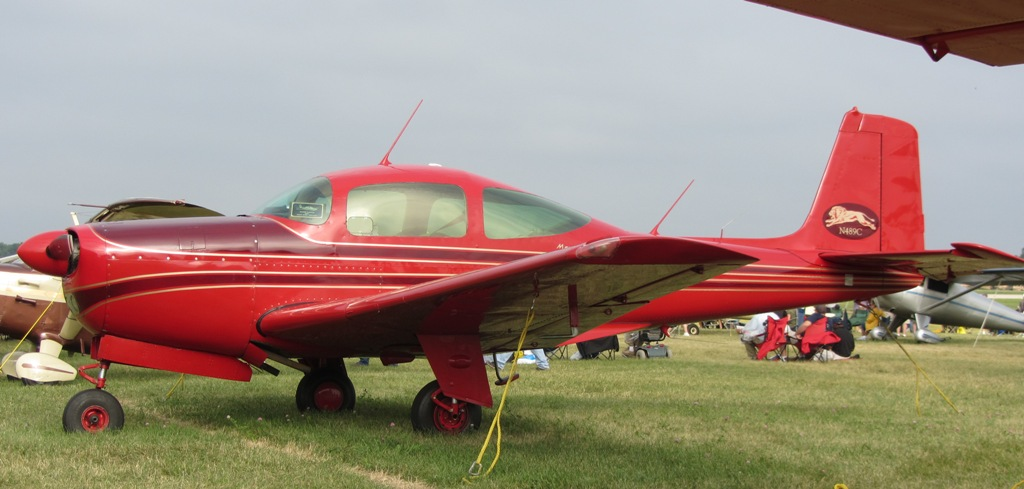
Meyers 200A

- 200 — single prototype powered by Continental O-470
- 200A — production version powered by Continental IO-470 (11 built)
- 200B — (17 built)
- 200C — raised roof-line and larger windshield (9 built)
- 200D — engine replaced with Continental IO-520-A and flush riveted wings (8 built)

=== Aero Commander ===
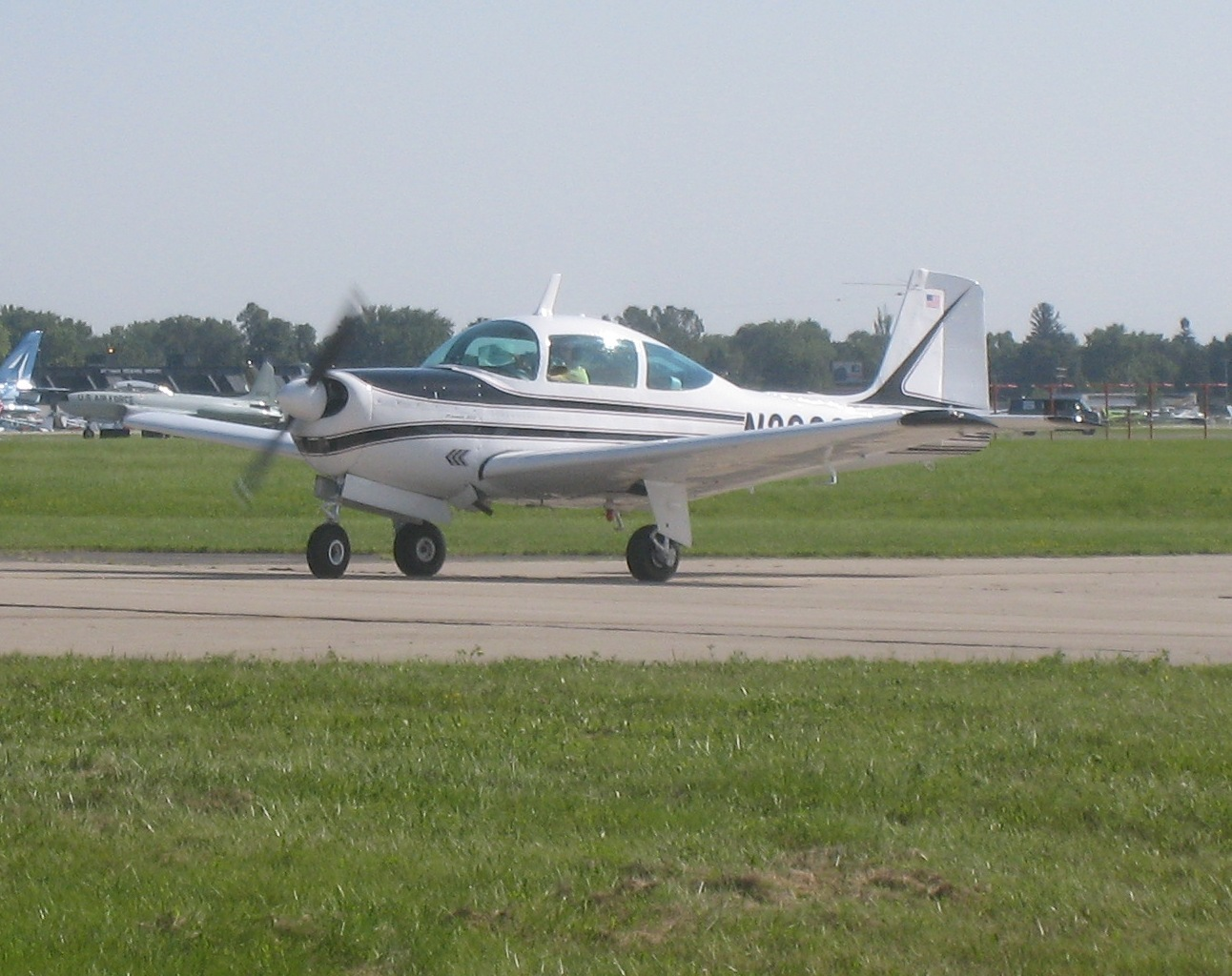
An Aero Commander 200D Taxiing

- 200 — Aero Commander version of the 200D (77 built)
- 200 — Aero Commander version of the 200E (1 prototype built)
- T200E — experimental twin-engine conversion - never built

=== Interceptor ===
- 400 — pressurised turboprop version based on the 200, fitted with a Garrett TPE331-1 engine rated at 400 shaft horsepower (298 kW).

== Specifications (Meyers 200D) ==
Data from Jane's All the World's Aircraft 1967–68

General characteristics

- Crew: 1
- Capacity: 3 passengers
- Length: 24 ft 4 in (7.42 m)
- Wingspan: 30 ft 6 in (9.30 m)
- Height: 7 ft 4 in (2.24 m)
- Wing area: 161.5 sq ft (15.00 m^{2})
- Airfoil: root: NACA 23015; tip: NACA 4412
- Empty weight: 1,940 lb (880 kg)
- Max takeoff weight: 3,000 lb (1,361 kg)
- Fuel capacity: 40 US gal (33 imp gal; 150 L) normal, 74 US gal (62 imp gal; 280 L) usable with auxiliary tanks in wing
- Powerplant: 1 × Continental IO-520-A air-cooled six-cylinder horizontally-opposed, 285 hp (213 kW)

Performance

- Maximum speed: 215 mph (346 km/h, 187 kn)
- Cruise speed: 210 mph (333 km/h, 180 kn) (max cruise)
- Stall speed: 54 mph (87 km/h, 47 kn) (wheels and flaps down)
- Range: 900 mi (1,400 km, 780 nmi) (normal fuel, 45 minutes reserve)
- Service ceiling: 18,500 ft (5,600 m)
- Rate of climb: 1,400 ft/min (7.1 m/s)
- Take-off run to 50 ft (15 m): 1,200 ft (370 m)
- Landing run from 50 ft (15 m): 1,150 ft (350 m)

== See also ==
Related development:

- Interceptor 400
- Meyers MAC-145

Comparable aircraft:

- Beechcraft Bonanza
- Bellanca Viking
- Johnson Rocket 185
- Ryan Navion
