= Al Meyers =

American pioneer aviator

Allen H. Meyers (September 4, 1908 – March 15, 1976) was an American pioneer aviator.

== Biography ==
He was a 20th-century aircraft designer. He was born in Allenhurst, New Jersey on September 4, 1908. After graduating from college as a mechanical engineer he worked for Chance Vought, Glenn Martin and Stinson Aircraft Company. He then moved to Michigan and started his own aircraft company. His first design was called the Meyers OTW which stood for Out To Win. It was a biplane with a metal fuselage and a metal, wood and fabric wing. It was designed specifically as a primary trainer, and first flew in 1936. It was certified by the CAA in 1939, and was produced for the Civilian Pilot Training Program during the 1930s to 1940s.

After World War II he designed the two-seat mono-wing Meyers MAC-145, an all-metal, retractable geared aircraft. In the late 1950s he designed and built the Meyers 200 which was a four-seat, all-metal aircraft. Both these aircraft had a steel structure and then covered in aluminum. Meyers built the model 200 until 1965 when he sold the company to Aero Commander. He then retired from aircraft building. In 1974, Meyers was elected to the Pioneer Aviation Hall of Fame.

Meyers died on March 15, 1976.
