= Mexican Expeditionary Air Force =

Military aviation unit in World War II

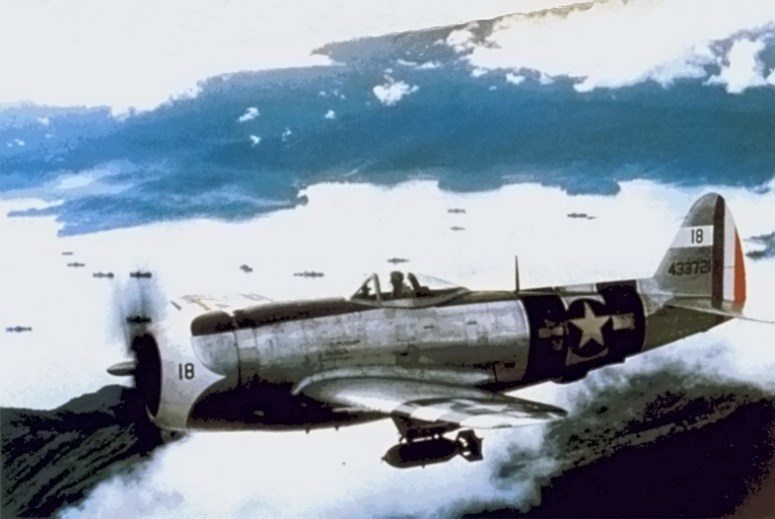
An American P-47D Thunderbolt being flown by a member of the Mexican Expeditionary Air Force over the Philippines (1945) The rondel is an American marking.

The Mexican Expeditionary Air Force (Spanish: Fuerza Aérea Expedicionaria Mexicana, FAEM) was a military aviation unit which represented Mexico on the Allied side during World War II. It is notable as the only Mexican military unit ever to fight outside Mexico itself.

== History ==
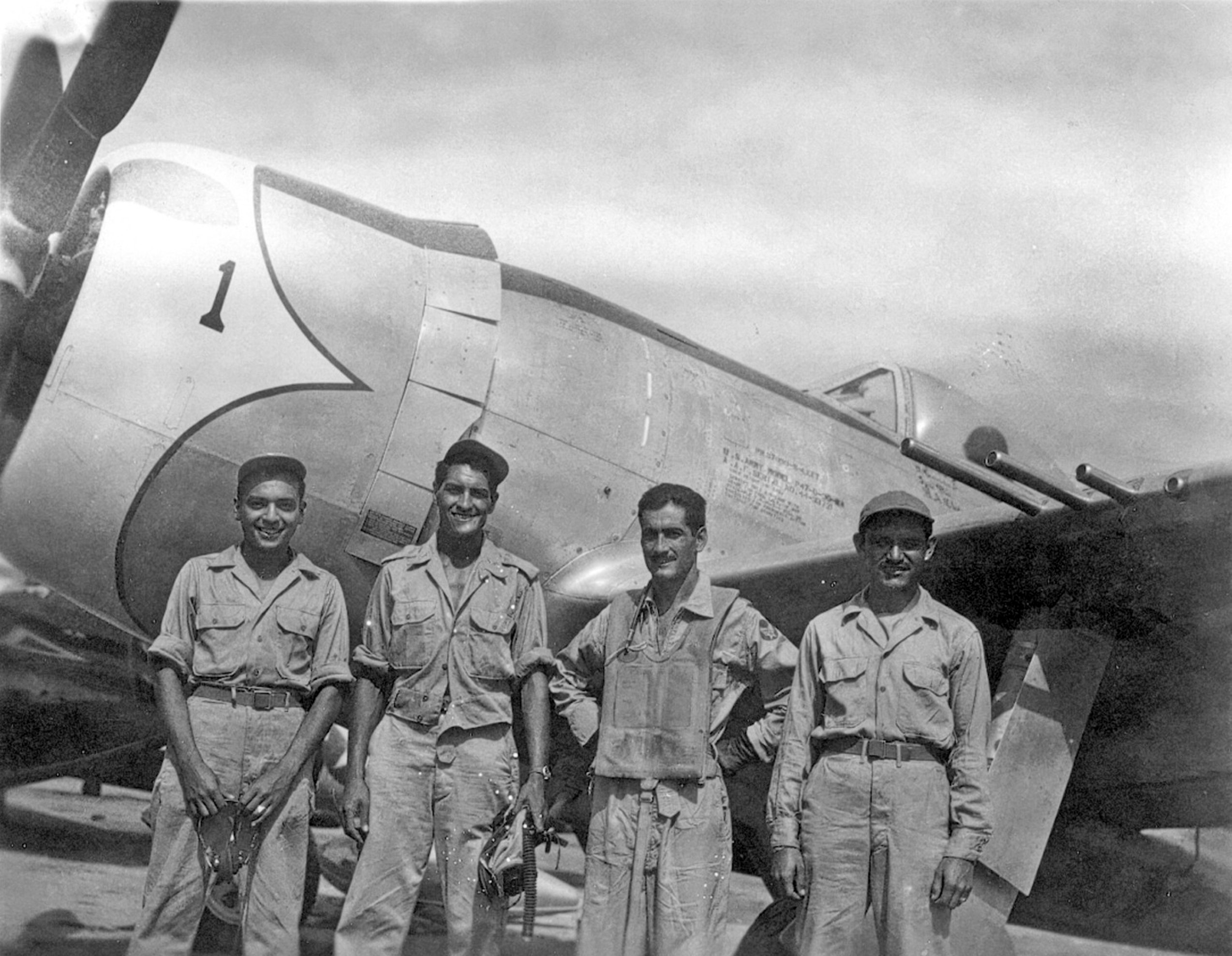
Capt. Radamés Gaxiola stands in front of his P-47D with his maintenance team after he returned from a combat mission

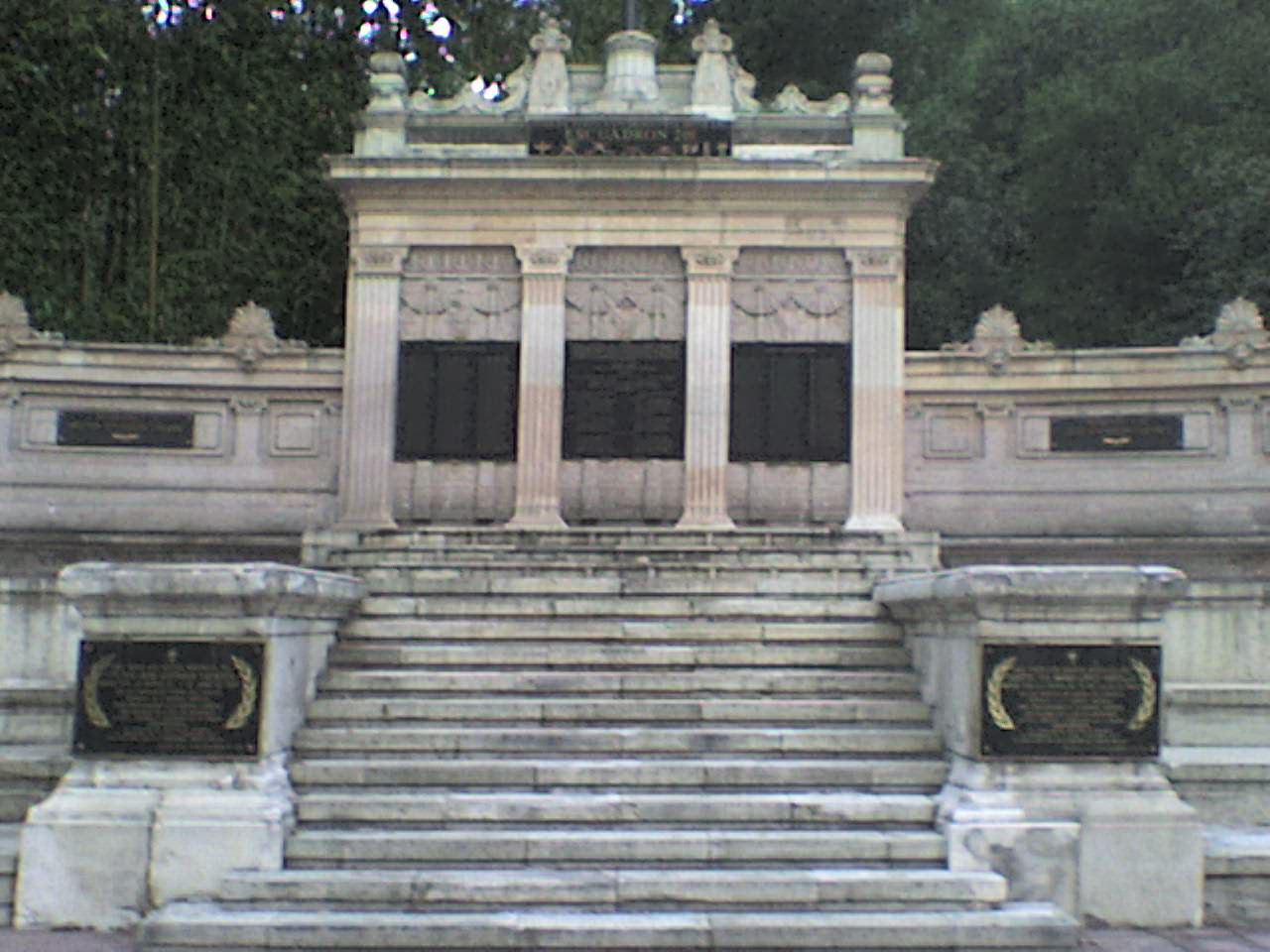
Monument to the 201 Squadron and the Mexican Expeditionary Air Force that took part in the liberation of the Philippines in 1945

Mexico declared war on the Axis Powers in support of the Allies on May 22, 1942, following losses of oil ships in the Gulf. The 201 Squadron name—also known as Aztec Eagles—applied to all pilots, mechanics, armorers and other personnel who were trained in the United States from July 1944 onward to take part in the conflict. The unit was previously known as the Grupo de Perfeccionamiento de Aeronáutica ("Aeronautical Training Group").

On 29 December 1944, Mexico's Senate authorized these troops to be sent into combat Founded by order 8606 of the Dirección de Aeronáutica of the Secretariat of National Defense, the unit was officially made part of the Mexican Army on 1 January 1945. Its structure was organised as Command (Mando), Command Group (Grupo de Comando), Escuadrón 201 and Reinforcement Group (Grupo de Reemplazos), to be consistent with the structure of a U.S. fighter squadron, though the unit flew with its own markings and remained under Mexican command—Colonel P.A. Antonio Cárdenas Rodríguez (1905–1969) was appointed its commander.

Trained on various bases in the U.S., at the end of their training they were reviewed by the Under Secretary of National Defense, general Francisco L. Urquizo on 23 February 1945 at Major's Field Airbase in Greenville, Texas. Due to their knowledge of Spanish and the victories in Europe the U.S. War department assigned these Mexican troops to the Pacific theater. They sailed out of San Francisco in the U.S. Navy transport Fairisle on 27 March, to aid other Allied forces in the liberation of the Japanese-occupied Philippines. On arrival in Manila on 30 April, Colonel Cárdenas was welcomed by General Douglas MacArthur, supreme Allied commander in the southwest Pacific. The FAEM was then given a base at camp Porac, Pampanga, in the Clark Field complex on the island of Luzon, forming part of 58th Fighter Group, V Fighter Command, U.S. Fifth Air Force.

FAEM's operational element—Escuadrón 201, commanded by 1° P.A. Radamés Gaxiola Andrade (1915–1966)—led 59 combat missions over Luzón and Formosa, of which 50 were deemed successful, making an efficiency of 85%, dropping 252 bombs totaling 1,000 lb (450 kg) and firing 138,652 .5 in (12.7 mm) machine gun rounds, with only five of its pilots killed in action. This implies a high efficiency since it was in action only from June–August 1945. At the end of the war, the FAEM returned to Mexico, where it paraded on Plaza de la Constitución in Mexico City on 18 November 1945.

== See also ==
- Brazilian Expeditionary Force
- Military history of Mexico
