= Antonio Cárdenas =

Antonio Cárdenas could refer to:

- Antonio Cárdenas Guillén (1962–2010), Mexican drug lord
- Antonio Cárdenas Rodríguez (1903–1969), Mexican Air Force officer
- Antonio Cárdenas Soto (fl. 1920s), Chilean politician
- Tony Cárdenas (born 1963), American politician
