= Strother Army Airfield =

WWII era US military installation

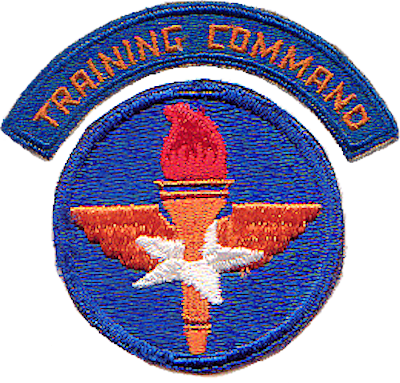
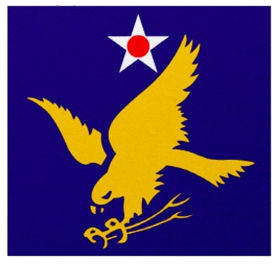
Strother Army Airfield Strother Air Force Base
- Part of Army Air Forces Flying Training Command; Second Air Force
- Located near Winfield and Arkansas City, Kansas
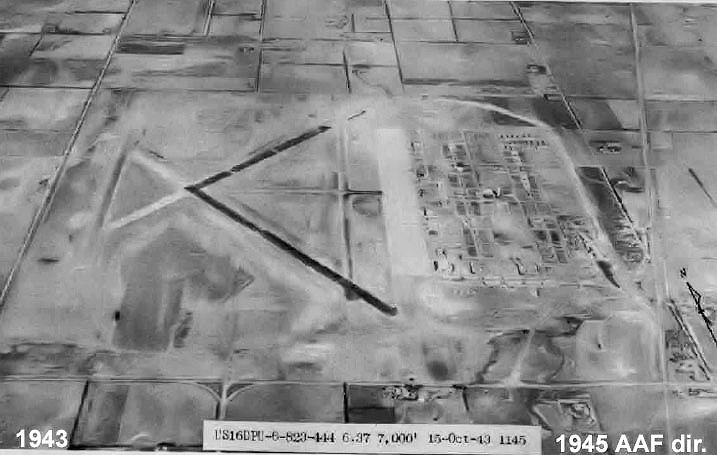
- Strother Army Air Field, 15 October 1943

Site information
- Type: Training Airfield

Location
- Coordinates: 37°10′07″N 97°02′15″W

Site history
- Built: 1942
- In use: 1942–1953

Strother Army Airfield was a World War II training base of the United States Army Air Forces Central Flying Training Command (CFTC), and later II Fighter Command. It is currently the city-owned Strother Field.

== History ==
Strother Army Air Field was a joint enterprise of the proximate cities of Winfield and Arkansas City to build a municipal airport which evolved, by the force of events, into construction of an Army airfield dedicated to basic flying training.

At a joint meeting on 6 February 1941 the two city commissions approved construction of an airport comprising some 240 acres with a 100 x 100-foot hangar. Authority to issue bonds had already been granted by the Kansas legislature. During the course of 1941 the Federal government's interest in this site for the establishment of an Army flying school became known. A site selection board of officers met at Arkansas City, 11 April 1942, and inspected the proposed airport site. In its report three days later, the board approved the proposed site. On the same day of the board meeting, 11 April, the two cities passed a resolution committing the municipalities to obtain approximately 1,400 acres of land to be leased to the Federal government at the rate of one dollar per year, and renewable yearly for 25 years.

=== Construction ===
The airfield is located midway between Arkansas City and Winfield, in Cowley county on U. S. Highway 77. The entire field comprised some 1,386 acres. Construction of the airfield began on 16 May 1942. Four asphalt runways, 5,500, 4,000, and two of 5,840 feet in length and all 150 feet wide, were built. Permanent type run- way lights were installed. Connecting these were four taxiways, three of asphalt and one of concrete, two of which were 700 feet in length, another 3,500 feet, and the fourth 1,600 feet. Three were 50 feet wide, one 100 feet.

In addition, there were four auxiliary fields, which building operations began at the same time.

- Winfield Army Auxiliary Airfield #1 37°08′01″N 96°55′42″W

Also known as "East Field". Airfield totaled 481 acres, was acquired from seven owners, partly by straight purchase and partly by Decision of Taking of the Federal District Court. Cost of the land was $48,941.

- Oxford Army Auxiliary Airfield #2 37°16′00″N 97°05′13″W

Also known as "North Field". Airfield contained 643 acres. It also was acquired from seven owners, partly by straight purchase and partly by Decision of Taking. Total cost was $70,409

- Winfield Army Auxiliary Airfield #3 37°11′42″N 97°11′08″W

Also known as "West Field". Airfield contained 631& acres which were acquired from eight owners. Only three acres were purchased; the remainder was acquired on annual lease.

- Arkansas City Army Auxiliary Airfield #5 37°02′55″N 97°09′28″W

Also known as "South Field". Airfield totaled 656.40 acres, was acquired from eight owners at a total cost of $46,169. A portion was obtained from straight purchase, while a Decision of Taking was necessary to acquire title to the remainder.

Storage facilities included three AAF and four Quartermaster buildings. All were of wood frame construction, with cement floors. Two instructional buildings, totaling 15,550 square feet with a total student capacity of 550, were erected. In addition, six Link Trainer buildings were provided, with a total capacity of 34. Under the general category of recreational and welfare facilities, day rooms, an officers' club and a service club, theater, chapel, post exchange, bowling alley, gymnasium, swimming pool, and a library were built. Housing was built to accommodate a total of 4,404 officers and men, while the hospital was designed for a normal bed capacity of 141. Although fuel was readily available locally, a gasoline capacity of 210,216 gallons was provided, and an oil storage capacity of 36,000 gallons.

=== Basic Flying School ===
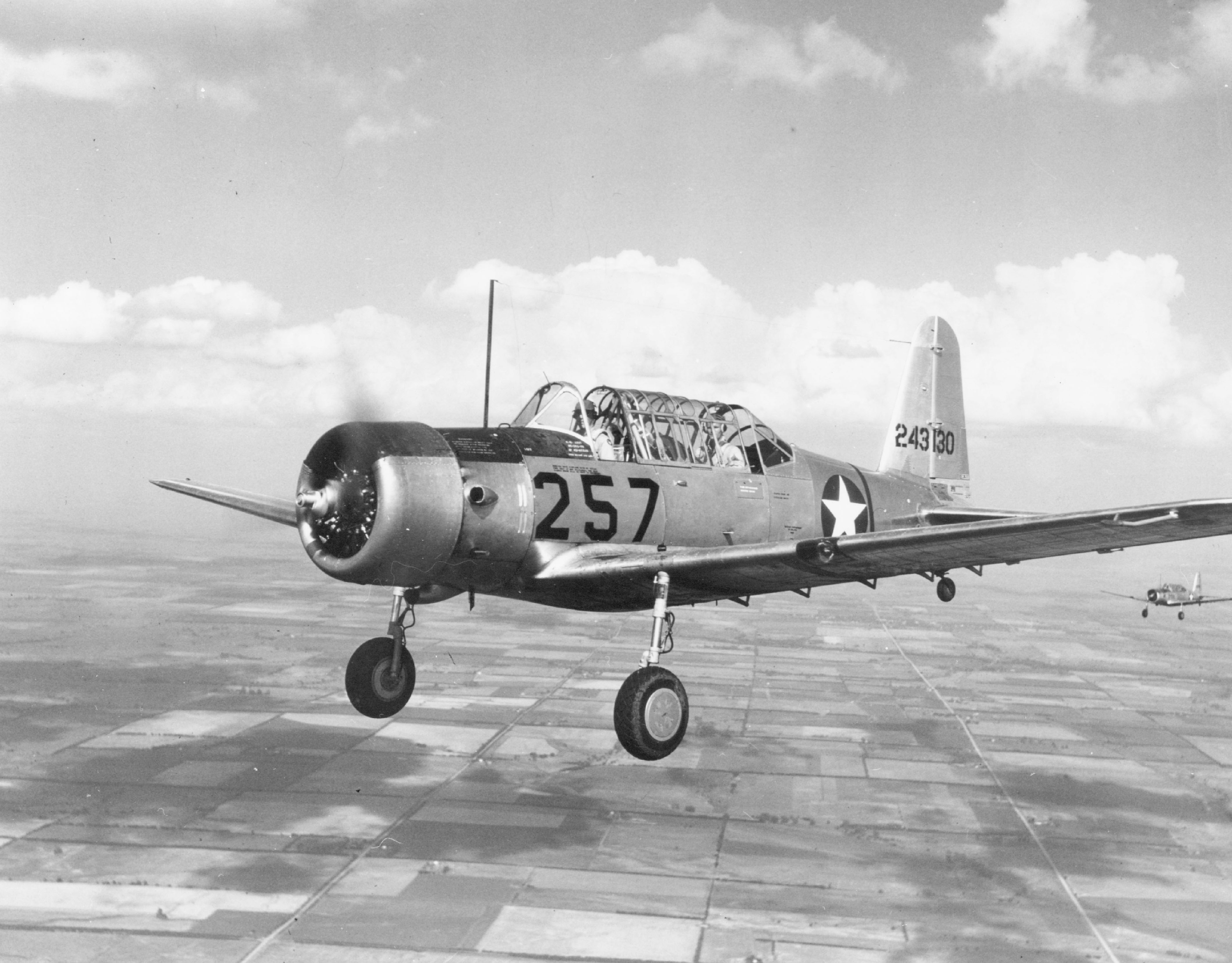
Vultee BT-13 Valiant basic flight trainer

The airfield was named Strother Field, named after Captain Donald Root Strother, who was killed over Java on 13 February 1942 while serving with the 7th Bombardment Group in the Dutch East Indies Campaign commanding a squadron of B-17 Flying Fortresses. He was the first Army Air Force pilot from Cowley County to be killed in World War II. Strother was born 26 October 1911, in Winfield. He attended the Winfield schools and Southwestern College, and in 1934 became a cadet in the Army Air Corps. Later he served two years as a civilian air line pilot. In 1938 Strother re-entered the Air Corps. The field was dedicated January 1943 by Kansas Governor Andrew Schoeppel, local officials and the Strother Field commander. During the ceremony which included a military and aerial review, The Distinguished Service Cross and Purple Heart were presented to Captain Strother's three-year-old son, Colbert.

The Basic Flying School at Strother Field was officially activated on 14 November 1942 under the jurisdiction of the 32d Flying Training Wing (Basic), Perrin Army Airfield, Texas as part of Central Flying Training Command (CFTC). Units activated at the airfield were the 108th Guard Squadron; 448th Base Headquarters and Air Base Squadron; 332d Aviation Squadron; 1082d, 1083d, and 1084th Basic Training Flying Squadrons.

The voracious demand for fighter pilots necessitated a very early inauguration of training on 14 or 15 December 1942 with the arrival of the first class of cadets from Fort Sumner Army Airfield, New Mexico and Majors Army Airfield, Texas. At that time, the runways had not been completed and planes were forced to operate from the parking ramp only, which was a very hazardous situation. Training consisted principally of 70 hours pilot training. Like most new training bases in this period, the greatest initial problem was a scarcity of training aircraft. Training was inaugurated with a ratio of one plane to six students. The Vultee BT-13 Valiant was the principal aircraft used for basic flight training. The 14 months between 1 January 1943 and 1 March 1944 were to bring to Strother Field, including those who arrived in the middle of December 1942 and those who remained after 1 March 1944, 14 classes of students. With the graduation of Class 44-G on 23 May, Strother Field had accomplished its mission as a basic pilot school of the Central Flying Training Command. This was the 16th class to take basic training at Strother.

=== Tactical Fighter Training ===
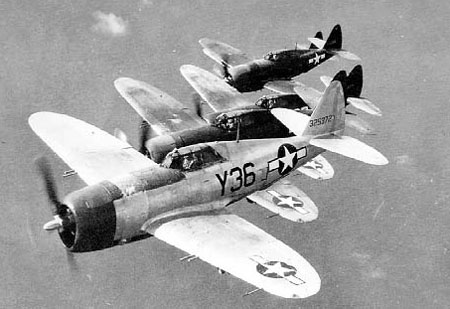
P-47D Thunderbolt trainers

On 1 June 1944 the basic flying training function at Strother ceased, and the field was taken over by the II Fighter Command, Second Air Force. Most of the permanent personnel of the old basic flying school were transferred within the Training Command, and the Second Air Force brought in its own personnel to man the base. Ground personnel were assigned to the 269th Army Air Forces Base Unit (Fighter Pilot Training Station). The chief problem facing the new command was transition from a basic flying training station to a tactical training station. For a full year Strother Field functioned as a fighter pilot combat crew training school flying principally P-47 Thunderbolt single-engine fighters. At the peak of operation there were approximately 3,400 Air Force personnel and 400 civilian employees at the field.

=== Inactivation ===
With the end of the war in sight, official orders were received on 27 July 1945 providing for the inactivation of the base by 15 August. Consequently, on 30 July a total reduction of force, both military and civilian, was begun. One by one the various units of operation were closed during the first 15 days of August. Flying training ended officially on 8 August, although in fact it had ceased four days before. By 15 August orders had been complied with in full, save for such minor modifications as were authorized by higher headquarters to meet existing needs.

Strother Field was placed on a standby status and assigned to Pratt Army Airfield as an auxiliary field. It served as a satellite for only a few months, for Pratt itself was inactivated in December 1945, and Strother was placed in an unmanned, inactive, standby status.

=== Strother Air Force Base ===
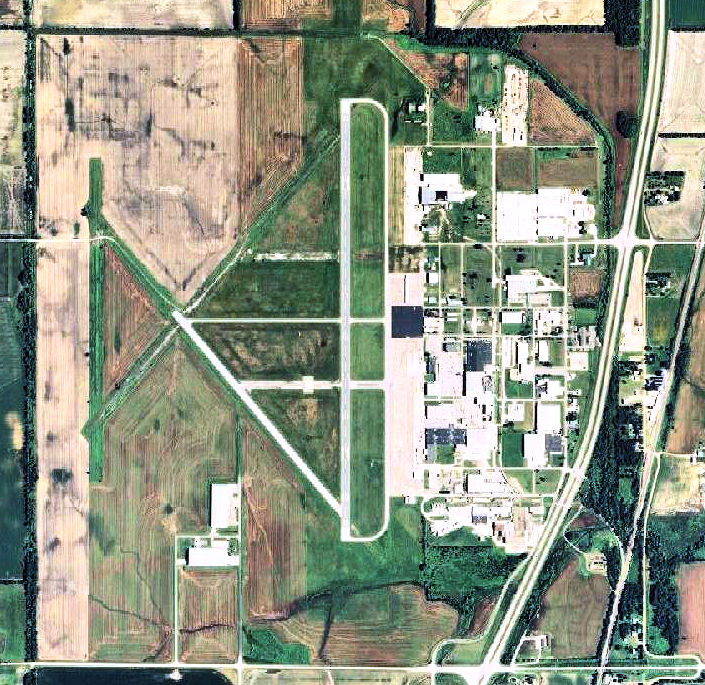
2006 airphoto of the former Strother Air Force Base

With the establishment of the United States Air Force in September 1947, the name of Strother was changed on 13 January 1948 to Strother Air Force Base. However, no further activity took place at Strother until about July 1948. At that time it assumed a housing function for a reserve composite squadron, Tenth Air Force, Continental Air Command. Sometime during 1949 or the first half of 1950 it ceased to perform even this function. By March 1952 it was housing the 9721st Volunteer Air Reserve Training Squadron. But between November 1953 and September 1954 this activity was removed, and up to March 1958 Strother Field was not used in any Air Force capacity.

A transfer agreement was drawn up between representatives of Oklahoma City Air Materiel Area, the District Engineer, Seventh Service Command at Omaha, Nebraska who assumed jurisdiction over the base, pending disposition. Excess buildings and demilitarized equipment were sold or transferred to other bases.

== Current status ==
The General Services Administration eventually turned the air base over to local government officials. Since then the installation has been operated jointly by the cities of Arkansas City and Winfield, Kansas as their municipal airport.

The N/S runway remains in use for the civil airport, the other two either being removed or inactive along with the supporting taxiways. About half of the parking apron remains, some of it being used by the Strother Field Airport, the remainder in an abandoned and deteriorated state; much of it having vegetation growing in the concrete expansion joints. Two, possibly three wartime hangars remain in use, albeit for non-aviation purposes.

The station has been redeveloped into "Strother Field Industrial Park", It has many light industrial and commercial businesses and uses the wartime street grid.

== See also ==
- Kansas World War II Army Airfields
- 32d Flying Training Wing (World War II)
