= James Connally Air Force Base =

Former USAF base, now TSTC Waco Airport

James Connally Air Force Base Waco Army Airfield
- Part of Tactical Air Command
- Waco, Texas
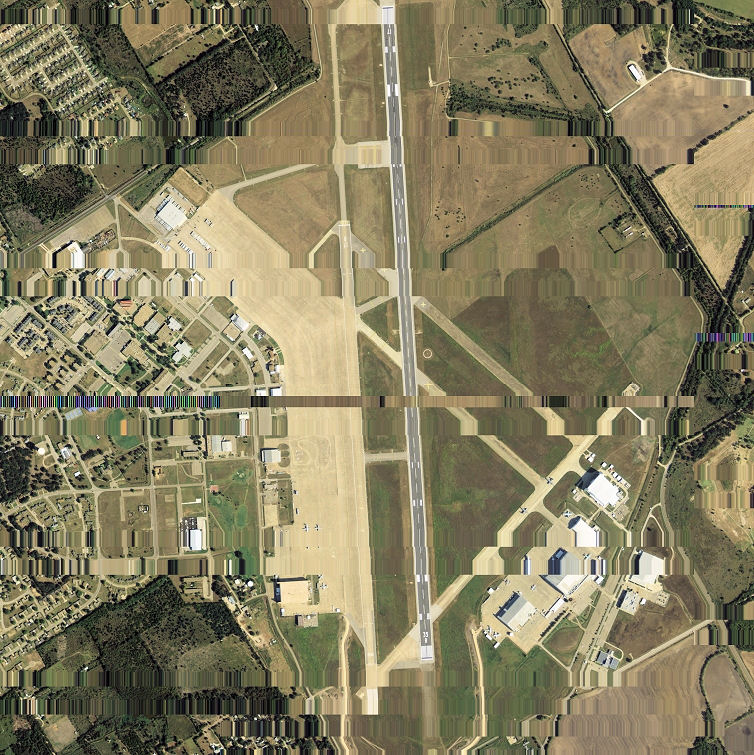
- Aerial photo of Connally Air Force Base, 2006

Site information
- Type: Air Base
- Controlled by: United States Air Force

Location
- Location of James Connally Air Force Base, Texas
- Coordinates: 31°38′16″N 97°04′45″W

Site history
- Built: 1941
- In use: 1941-1966

Garrison information
- Garrison: Tactical Air Command

Waco Army Air Field 1944 Classbook

James Connally Air Force Base was a United States Air Force base located north of Waco, Texas. After its closure in 1968, the airport reopened as TSTC Waco Airport.

== History ==
=== World War II ===
The airport opened May 5, 1942 as Waco Army Air Field and was the headquarters of the Army Air Force Central Instructors' School during World War II. It was deactivated after the war in 1945 but was reactivated in 1948 as a pilot training base under the Air Training Command.

=== Air Training Command ===
Waco Field was renamed for Colonel James T. Connally who had been killed in Japan in 1945. The airport was initially called Connally Air Force Base but the name evolved to also include his first name.

In 1951, pilot training was discontinued and replaced with academic and flight training for navigators, radar operators, and bombardiers, with particular emphasis for those officers slated for eventual assignment to Strategic Air Command's B-36 Peacemaker and its ever-increasing fleet of B-47 Stratojets.

Pilot training returned in 1953 and an advanced jet pilot training organization with T-33 Shooting Stars was established in addition to navigator training in TB-25 Mitchells.

In January 1958, the base became a support facility when the USAF located headquarters of Twelfth Air Force (12 AF) in nearby Waco TX. The Headquarters complex was located near 25th Street and Windsor Ave. No remains of the buildings are present today.

In 1965, the Air Force began sharing the base with the State of Texas, the latter having established the James Connally Technical Institute (JCTI) of Texas A&M University. which would eventually become the main campus and headquarters of Texas State Technical Institute (TSTI).

=== Tactical Air Command ===
In 1966, Convair / General Dynamics also established a modification center at the base to modify B-58 Hustler bombers.

The 602d Tactical Control Group was established at the base on 1 March 1966, but moved within two months to Bergstrom Air Force Base, Texas.

=== Base Closure ===
In 1968, as part of a nationwide reduction in air force bases and naval air stations to stay within congressional funding limits while continuing to prosecute the war in Vietnam, James Connally AFB was closed. All navigator training consolidated at Mather Air Force Base, California, and 12th Air Force relocated to Bergstrom Air Force Base in Austin, Texas. At this point, the facility was conveyed to the State of Texas by the General Services Administration (GSA). The airport and the base facilities were used as a technical school while General Dynamics remained as a tenant performing modification work on various military aircraft. The General Dynamics facility later ceased operation.

From January 2001 through January 2009, the former airfield of James Connally AFB was used by Air Force One when US President George W. Bush visited his Prairie Chapel Ranch, also known as the Western White House, in Crawford, Texas.

=== Civilian Operations ===
In 1984, ElectroSpace Systems Inc. (ESI) constructed a new hangar at the airport for aircraft modification that opened in 1985. In 1987, Chrysler bought ESI and the facility was later named Chrysler Technologies Airborne Systems or CTAS. Chrysler subsequently sold the operation to Raytheon in 1996 which renamed the facility Raytheon Aircraft Integration Systems. In 2002, Raytheon sold the facility to L-3 Communications and it is currently known as L-3 Communications Platform Integration Division (PID).

In 1991, TSTI was renamed Texas State Technical College (TSTC).

== See also ==
- Texas World War II Army Airfields
- 32d Flying Training Wing (World War II)
