= Fausto Vega Santander =

- Born: November 19, 1923; Tuxpan, Veracruz, Mexico
- Died: June 1, 1945 (aged 21); Luzon, Philippines
- Military career
- Allegiance: Mexico
- Branch: Mexican Air Force
- Service years: 1940–1945
- Rank: Sub-lieutenant
- Nicknames: Cacho, Cachito
- Unit: Escuadrón 201
- Conflicts: World War II; South Pacific Theatre; Battle of Luzon

Fausto Vega Santander (born November 19, 1923 – June 1, 1945) was a Mexican aviator who died in a crash while fighting during World War II.

Fausto Vega Santander was born in Tuxpan, Veracruz; his parents were Albino Vega and María Santander. He received his primary education at Enrique C. Rebsamen School in his hometown.

== Military career ==
In 1940, after graduating from high school, Vega Santander joined the Mexican Air Force. He graduated from the Military Aviation School as a Sub-lieutenant and then served as a special instructor in the aviation school in Guadalajara, Jalisco, in 1944.

After Mexico declared war against the Axis powers (Germany, Italy and the Empire of Japan) in May 1942, in March 1945 Mexico sent Sub-lieutenant Fausto Vega Santander's unit, the 201st Fighter Squadron, to the South Pacific Theatre. The squadron was attached to the 58th Fighter Group of the United States Army Air Forces (USAAF) during the liberation of the main Philippines island of Luzon in the spring of 1945.

On 1 June 1945, Santander crashed during dive bombing practice near Tabones Island, a small islet off Luzon, near Nagsasa Bay on the Redondo Peninsula. His aircraft, a Republic P-47D Thunderbolt, crashed into the sea at high speed and exploded. The USAAF search and rescue team was not able to locate his body.

== Legacy ==
Fausto Vega Santander is commemorated on the 201st Fighter Squadron's memorial marker in Mexico City's Chapultepec Park, near the Niños Héroes monument.

The Mexican poet Germán Muriel Azarria, wrote of the young aviator in limericks in the poem entitled "Eaglet fallen."
