= Curtis Field =

Airport in McCulloch County, Texas

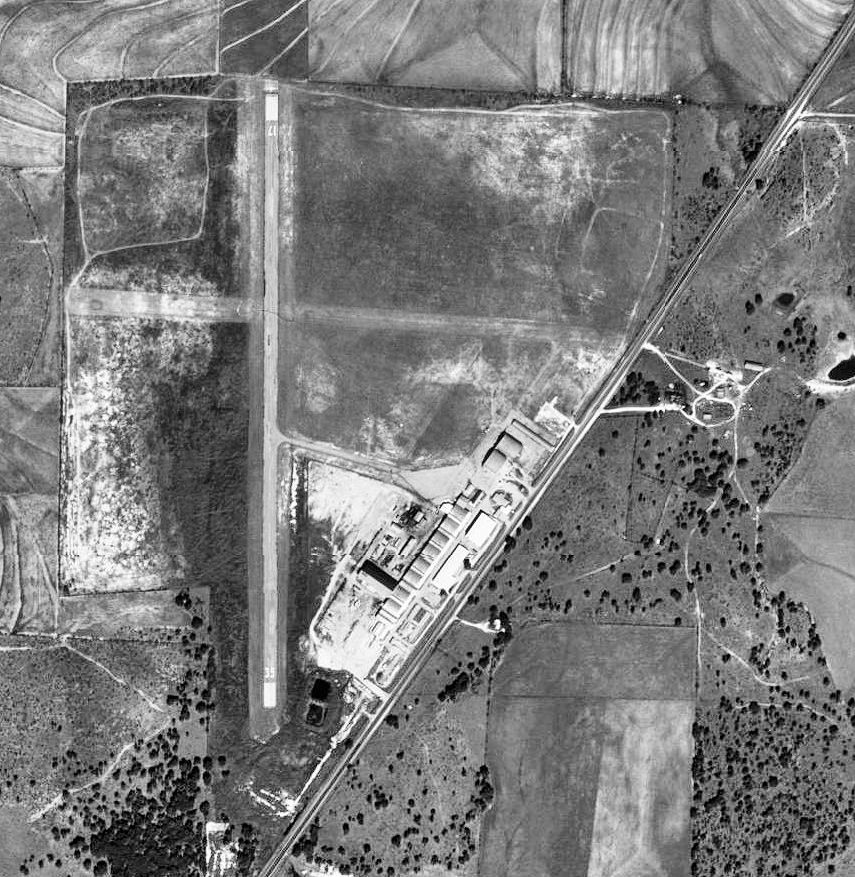
- USGS aerial image (13 January 1995)
- IATA: BBD; ICAO: KBBD; FAA LID: BBD

Summary
- Airport type: Public
- Owner: City of Brady
- Serves: Brady, Texas
- Elevation AMSL: 1,827 ft (557 m)
- Coordinates: 31°10′45″N 99°19′26″W

Map
- Location within Texas

Runways
| Direction | Length | | Surface |
| Direction | ft | m | Surface |
|---|---|---|---|
| 17/35 | 4,605 | 1,404 | Asphalt |
- Source: Federal Aviation Administration

Curtis Field (IATA: BBD, ICAO: KBBD, FAA LID: BBD) is a city-owned airport three miles northeast of Brady, in McCulloch County, Texas. The airport is named for Mayor Harry L. Curtis of Brady, who proposed the site as an auxiliary field for the United States Army Air Forces (USAAF). The FAA's National Plan of Integrated Airport Systems for 2009–2013 calls it a general aviation facility.

== History ==
Curtis Field 1941 Classbook

Construction of the airport began in November 1940. The Works Progress Administration provided labor for the project with the city and county providing equipment for leveling and grading. The airport opened in August 1941. On January 1, 1942, the facility was taken over by the United States Army Air Forces and was used during World War II as a primary (stage 1) pilot training airfield. Facilities at the 354-acre field included a headquarters building and annex, a ground school, an infirmary, mess hall, three barracks, and four hangars.

Known as Curtis Field, the facility was operated as a contract pilot school, operated initially by the Brady Aviation School for the USAAF Gulf Coast Training Center (later Central Flying Training Command). Later, the contract was taken over by the Dallas Aviation School and Air College.

Several local axillary landing airfields were associated with Curtis Field, the Curtis Ranch; Moore Field; Sneed Field and White Field for emergency and overflow landings.

It is notable that enlisted sergeant pilots received their primary flight training at Curtis Field in early 1942. This program was ended later in the year. The last pilot training class ended in February 1945 and military control of the airport ended.

Airline flights (Trans-Texas DC-3s) ended in 1958–59.

== See also ==
- Texas World War II Army Airfields
- 32d Flying Training Wing (World War II)
- List of airports in Texas
