= Francisco Luis Urquizo =

Mexican politician

Francisco L. Urquizo
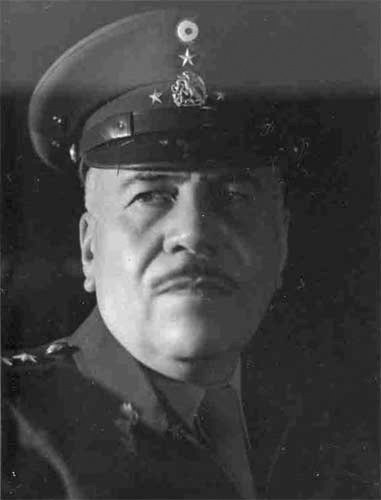
- General Francisco L. Urquizo Benavides

Secretary of National Defense
- In office 1 September 1945 – 30 November 1946
- President: Manuel Ávila Camacho
- Preceded by: Lázaro Cárdenas
- Succeeded by: Gilberto R. Limón

Secretary of War and Navy
- In office 17 September 1919 – 20 May 1920
- President: Venustiano Carranza
- Preceded by: Juan José Ríos
- Succeeded by: Plutarco Elías Calles

Personal details
- Born: June 21, 1891 San Pedro de las Colonias, Coahuila, Mexico
- Died: April 6, 1969 (aged 77) Mexico City, Mexico
- Awards: Belisario Domínguez Medal of Honour; Mexican Legion of Honour

Military service
- Allegiance: Mexico (antireeleccionista revolutionary forces)
- Branch/service: Liberation Army of the South 1911, Federal Army 1912-1913, Constitutional Army 1913-1920, Mexican Army 1920, 1934-1969
- Years of service: 1911-1920, 1934-1969
- Rank: General
- Commands: Secretariat of National Defence
- Battles/wars: Mexican Revolution: Attack on San Pedro de las Colonias; Ten Tragic Days; Battle of Candela; Battle of Torreon; Taking of Monterrey; Fights of Apizaco, Rinconada and Aljibes; Tlaxcalantongo

Francisco Luis Urquizo Benavides (21 June 1891 – 6 April 1969) was a Mexican soldier, writer and historian who fought in the Mexican Revolution, rose to the rank of major general, and served as Secretary of National Defense from September 1945 to November 1946. He was also one of the most significant authors in the genre of historical fiction known as the "novela revolucionaria," a term used to describe works set during the Mexican Revolution. Tropa vieja, which is considered his major narrative work, earned him the sobriquet "novelist of the soldier."

His son, Juan Manuel Urquizo Pérez de Tejada, has described Urquizo as "at once a key protagonist of and witness of the Revolution, who left an invaluable testimony in writing, rising to the category of chronicler of the act of revolution."

== Mexican Revolution ==
In 1911, in his native Coahuila, Urquizo became a soldier in the Mexican Revolution, serving under Emilio Madero. He later joined the Presidential Guard of Francisco I. Madero, fighting alongside him during the Ten Tragic Days. Upon the death of President Madero, he escaped from Mexico City and resisted Huerta's usurpation as part of the Constitutionalist Army commanded by Venustiano Carranza. After organizing a battalion of volunteers with whom he attacked the federal garrison under José Alessio Robles, he participated in the taking of Torreón and in the attack on Monterrey as part of the Division of the North.

Promoted to the rank of brigadier general, in 1916, he served, in turn, as commander of the Escort of the First Chief of the Constitutionalist Army, military commander of the Port of Veracruz and of Mexico City, and Chief of Military Operations in the State of Veracruz; he organized and had at his command the Supreme Powers Division and founded the Academy of the General Staff, the forerunner of today's Heroic Military College.

Urquizo was always loyal to Carranza, more than to Francisco Villa and the First Convention, and gave his fealty also to Álvaro Obregón when Obregón revolted against the government. Named Secretary of War and Navy in 1920, Urquizo fought in the battles of Apizaco, Rinconada and Aljibes against the insurgents who threatened the trains in which the government withdrew from Mexico City to Veracruz. After the defeat in Aljibes and the subsequent assassination of President Carranza in Tlaxcalantongo, Puebla, on May 21, 1920, Urquizo was incarcerated along with generals Francisco Murguía, Francisco de Paula Mariel, and Juan Barragán in the military prison of Santiago Tlatelolco.

== Exile ==
When he was released, he chose to go into exile in Europe. Although he had published works of journalism as early as 1913, some sources say that it was not until his period of exile that he began to produce literary works. According to his youngest son, Juan Manuel Urquizo Pérez de Tejada, however, Urquizo began writing long before his exile. "At the same time that he was making his military career," wrote the younger Urquizo, "he was making his writing career, engaging in hand-to-hand combat and then writing literary works in which he recounts the events, describes characters and places, and takes us by the hand through the horror of war and the privations of the troops, but also through the hope and joy of triumph."

== Post-revolutionary service ==
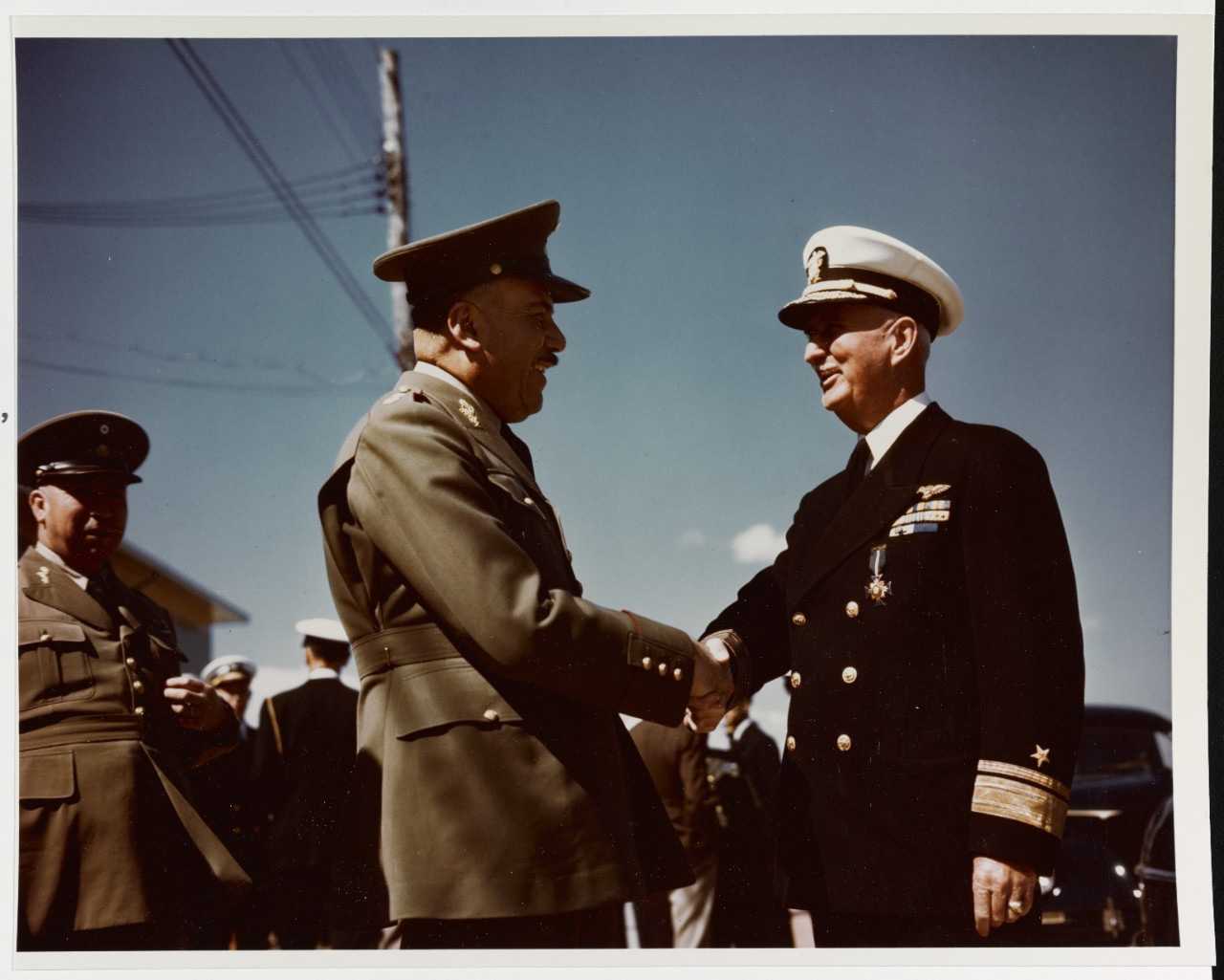
General Urquizo as under secretary of National Defense, congratulates Rear admiral Charles P. Mason, Chief of the Naval Air Intermediate Training Command, after presenting him with the Mexican Military Merit Order, 1st Class in ceremonies at N.A.S. Corpus Christi, Texas, February 1945.

Returning to Mexico, he was invited by the then president, Lázaro Cárdenas del Río, to rejoin the Army. He was promoted to major general by President Manuel Ávila Camacho. In 1942, he became Undersecretary of Defense and began to promote the modernization of the Army, instituted the National Military Service, and formed the Motorized Brigade and Parachute Corps. He conceived the creation of the 201st Squadron of the Mexican Expeditionary Air Force, which fought alongside the Allies in the Pacific during the Second World War, and of which he formally took leave in Greenville, Texas, on February 23, 1945. He served as Secretary of National Defense from 1 September 1945 to 30 November 1946 under President Manuel Ávila Camacho, and was commandant of the Mexican Legion of Honor from 1951 to 1953.

== Writings ==
In addition to his novels of the revolution, he wrote historical works and travel books as well as plays and film scripts. From his early years, he was a columnist for the newspapers El Nacional and El Universal, and for the magazines Mañana, El Legionario, El Universal Ilustrado, and Tópicos.

== Memberships ==
He was a commander of the Mexican Legion of Honor, a member of the Mexican Society of Geography and Statistics, and a founder of the Institute of Historical Studies of the Mexican Revolution.

== Honors and awards ==
In 1967 he received the Belisario Dominguez Medal of the Senate of the Republic, the highest decoration awarded by the Mexican Senate. He was also decorated by the governments of Argentina, Cuba, Ecuador, the United States, Guatemala, Haiti, Poland, and Venezuela.

== Principal Published Works ==
- Memorias de campaña
- Tropa Vieja
- ¡Viva Madero!
- Páginas de la Revolución
- La ciudadela quedó atrás
- Fui soldado de levita de esos de caballería
- México - Tlaxcalantongo
- Morelos, genio militar de la Independencia
- Europa Central en 1922
- A un Joven Militar Mexicano
- Madrid de los Años Veinte
- Recuerdo Que...
- Tres de Diana
- Charlas de Sobremesa
- El Capitán Arnaud
- Lo Incognoscible
