= 32nd Flying Training Wing (World War II) =

32d Flying Training Wing
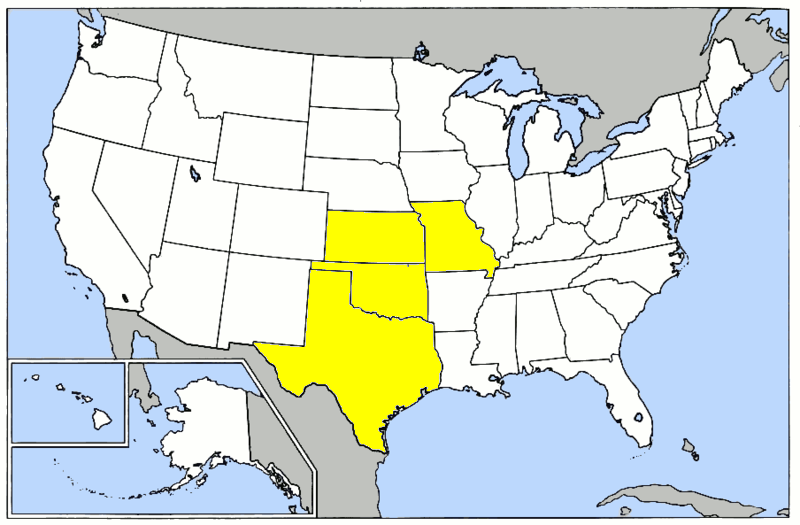
- Locations of airfields controlled by the 32d Flying Training Wing
- Active: 1942-1946
- Country: United States
- Branch: United States Army Air Forces
- Type: Command and Control
- Role: Training
- Part of: Army Air Forces Training Command
- Engagements: World War II: World War II American Theater

The 32d Flying Training Wing is an inactive United States Air Force unit. It was last assigned to the Central Flying Training Command, and was disbanded on 13 October 1946 at the Randolph Field, Texas.

There is no lineage between the United States Air Force 32d Composite Wing, established on 22 November 1940 as the 32d Pursuit Group (Fighter) at Rio Hato Army Airbase, Panama, and this organization.

== History ==
The wing was a World War II Command and Control organization which supported Training Command Basic Flight Schools. At the schools, Phase II Basic Pilot Training taught the cadets to fly in formation, fly by instruments or by aerial navigation, fly at night, and fly for long distances. Cadets got about 70 flight hours in trainers before being promoted to Advanced Training.

=== Lineage ===
- Established as 32d Flying Training Wing on 17 December 1942.

Activated on 16 January 1943
Disbanded on 13 October 1946

=== Assignments ===
- Army Air Forces Gulf Coast Training Center, 16 January 1943

Re-designated: Central Flying Training Command, 31 July 1943-13 October 1946.

=== Training aircraft ===
The primary aircraft used was the Vultee BT-13 Valiant twin-seat, single engine trainer. Mid-1930s era North American BT-9s were flown at Randolph until 1943. The North American BT-14 and the Vultee BT-15 were also used, the BT-15 being a higher-horsepower version of the BT-13.

Beginning in late 1944 the USAAF (as well as the USN) began replacing the Vultee BT-13 / BT-15 Valiant from the Basic phase of flight training with the North American AT-6 Texan

=== Assigned Pilot Schools ===
Curtis Field, Brady, Texas
AAF Contract Pilot School (Basic)
Opened: May 1941, Closed: August 1945 (PT-17, PT-19, BT-13, BT-15)
Operated by: Brady Aviation School, Dallas Aviation School and Air College; three auxiliary airfields; the school, originally for primary flight training, was used for basic training twice in its history but had reverted to primary training when it was closed.

Coffeyville Army Airfield, Coffeyville, Kansas
AAF Pilot School (Basic)
47th Basic Flying Training Group
Opened: October 1942, Closed: May 1944 (BT-13)
Basic flying school closed May 1944; became Third Air Force photo-reconnaissance pilot training school (F-5E Mustang), Closed October 1945

Enid Army Airfield, Enid, Oklahoma
AAF Pilot School (Basic)
48th Basic Flying Training Group
Opened: December 1941, Closed: January 1945 (BT-13, BT-15)
Basic flying school closed January 1945; became advanced twin-engine school (B-25) February 1945. Remained open as a permanent training airfield after war ended, now Vance Air Force Base

Garden City Army Airfield, Garden City, Kansas
AAF Pilot School (Basic)
49th Basic Flying Training Group
Opened: December 1942, Closed: December 1944 (BT-13)

Goodfellow Field, San Angelo, Texas
AAF Pilot School (Basic)
53d Basic Flying Training Group
Opened: May 1941, Closed: December 1944 (BT-13, BT-14)
Added advanced single-engine school (AT-6) January 1945; Remained open as a permanent training airfield after war ended, now Goodfellow Air Force Base

Independence Army Airfield, Independence, Kansas
AAF Pilot School (Basic)
Opened: January 1942, Closed: January 1945 (BT-14, BT-15)
Aircraft Fuselage Code: "S"

Malden Army Airfield, Malden, Missouri
AAF Pilot School (Basic)
Opened: March 1943, Closed: May 1945 (BT-13)
Aircraft Fuselage Code: "ML"; Basic flying school closed January 1945; became glider training school under I Troop Carrier Command, closed September 1945.

Majors Army Airfield, Greenville, Texas
AAF Pilot School (Basic)
50th Basic Flying Training Group
Opened: August 1942, Closed: November 1944 (BT-13)
Basic flying school closed November 1944; reassigned to II Fighter Command and became P-47 Replacement Training Unit; Airfield closed July 1945

Perrin Field, Sherman, Texas
AAF Pilot School (Basic)
53d Basic Flying Training Group
Opened: January 1942, Closed: January 1944 (BT-13)
Aircraft Fuselage Code: "N"; Basic flying school closed March 1945; became advanced single-engine school (AT-6); Remained open as a permanent training airfield after war ended as Perrin Air Force Base, Closed 1971.

Randolph Field, San Antonio, Texas
AAF Pilot School (Basic)
Airfield opened 1931 as primary Air Corps Basic Flying training school. Wartime Basic school operated BT-9 and BT-14s, closed April 1944, became Advanced school with AT-6s
Basic aircraft Fuselage Code: "C"; Remained open as a permanent training airfield after war ended; now Randolph Air Force Base

Strother Army Airfield, Winfield, Kansas
AAF Pilot School (Basic)
Opened: November 1942, Closed: May 1944 (BT-13)
Aircraft Fuselage Code: "K" (Used as a suffix); Basic flying school closed May 1944; reassigned to II Fighter Command and became P-47 Replacement Training Unit; Airfield closed August 1945

Waco Army Airfield, Waco, Texas
AAF Pilot School (Basic)
54th Basic Flying Training Group
Opened: April 1942, Closed: September 1944 (BT-13)
Basic flying school closed September 1944; Became advanced single-engine (AT-6), also twin-engine (UC-78) school, airfield closed September 1945; later reopened 1948 as Connally Air Force Base, closed 1969

=== Stations ===
- Perrin Field, Texas, 16 January 1943
- Randolph Field, Texas

Temporary assignment 31 Oct 1945, became permanent station on 5 August-13 October 1946

== See also ==
- Army Air Forces Training Command
- Other Training Command Basic Flight Training Wings:

27th Flying Training Wing (World War II) Eastern Flying Training Command
35th Flying Training Wing (World War II) Western Flying Training Command

- Other Central Flying Training Command Flight Training Wings:

31st Flying Training Wing (World War II) Primary Flight Training
33d Flying Training Wing (World War II) Advanced Flight Training
33d Flying Training Wing (World War II) Advanced Flight Training, Two Engine
34th Flying Training Wing (World War II) Bombardier and Specialized Two/Four-Engine Training
77th Flying Training Wing (World War II) Advanced Flight Training, Single Engine
80th Flying Training Wing (World War II) Navigation and Glider
