= Miguel Moreno Arreola =

Mexican military pilot

- Born: January 5, 1921; Ignacio Ramírez, Durango, Mexico
- Died: December 1, 2005 (aged 84); Mexico City, Mexico
- Military career
- Allegiance: Mexico
- Branch: Mexican Air Force
- Service years: 1940–1945
- Rank: Sub-lieutenant
- Unit: Escuadrón 201
- Conflicts: World War II; South Pacific Theatre; Battle of Luzon
- Other work: Commercial pilot

Miguel Moreno Arreola (1921–2005) was a Mexican military pilot. He was born in Durango, Mexico on January 5, 1921, and died in Mexico City on December 1, 2005, following a motor-vehicle accident. He distinguished himself during World War II, flying combat missions with the 201 Squadron based in the Philippines taking missions to Japan.
