= Garden City Army Airfield =

Former US Army airfield in Kansas

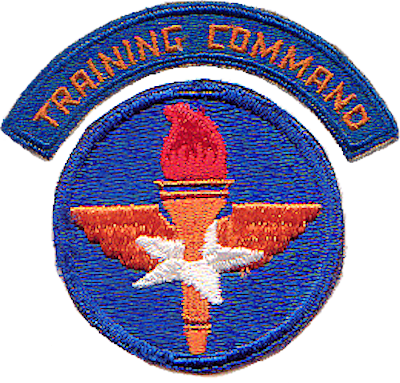
Garden City Army Airfield
- Part of Army Air Forces Flying Training Command
- Located near Garden City, Kansas
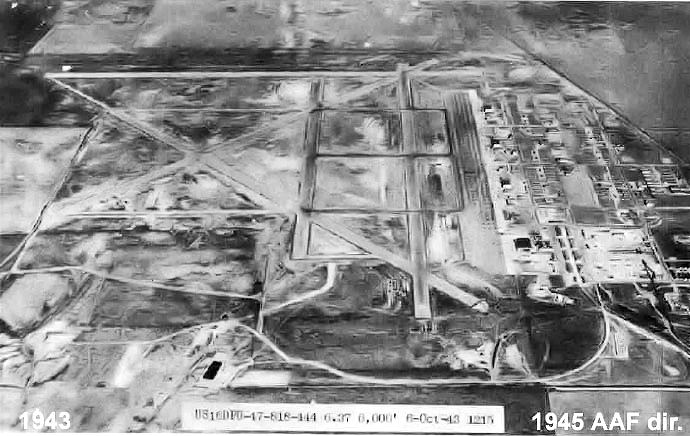
- Garden City Army Airfield 6 Oct 1943

Site information
- Type: Training Airfield

Location
- Location within Kansas
- Coordinates: 37°55′39″N 100°43′28″W

Site history
- Built: 1942
- In use: 1942–1947

Garden City Army Airfield was a World War II training base of the United States Army Air Forces Central Flying Training Command (CFTC). It is currently the city-owned Garden City Regional Airport.

== History ==
The Garden City, Kansas, Chamber of Commerce did most of the effective work in getting an airfield established in their area. At first, all of its energies were concentrated on acquiring one of the RAF training fields which were to be established in the United States during 1941–1942. In June 1941, the Chamber of Commerce sent representatives with an elaborate booklet to the War Department, setting forth the advantages of locating a flying school in Finney County, Kansas, buttressed by photographs of the area, and containing information on water and natural gas resources, and weather conditions.

Perhaps the major obstacle to locating a training base in Kansas was the decision of the AAF Gulf Coast Training Center not to locate primary or basic training bases north of the Kansas–Oklahoma border because of poor flying weather compared to Oklahoma and Texas. To combat this decision, the Kansas delegation prepared detailed weather statistics which showed that the south portion of Kansas has as many clear and partly cloudy days as San Antonio, Texas. Over a period of 18 months a great amount of data was filed with the War Department. The cumulative effect of this information, plus the later government surveys which were largely in agreement, was in large part responsible for a reversal by the War Department of the decision of the Gulf Coast Training Command.

The first knowledge of a firm intention to construct a base in the Garden City area came to the local civic leaders on 8 April 1942, with a telegram from Washington announcing the imminent arrival of a board of officers to choose a site for the base. Three days later, the board of officers arrived and, under the guidance of the aviation committee of the Garden City Chamber of Commerce, a site was chosen 12 miles east of Garden City on US Highway 50 South. On 16 June 1942, surveying crews began work at the site outlining runways and staking buildings. When the crews arrived, the area of the projected base was a ripe wheat field. Consequently, the first days were a sort of combined operation, which began with the farmers threshing a strip down the proposed runways to enable surveyors to start. Farming and surveying proceeded simultaneously.

The construction program at Garden City was cut off before it really got under way by the orders of Headquarters, Army Air Forces, in June 1942, stopping work on nine of the 14 proposed British Operational Training Units. This change wiped out the entire western Kansas project of British bases, including Garden City, Dodge City, Pratt, and Liberal. From the middle of June until the latter part of July 1942, the Garden City officials did not know what kind of installation would be located in their community, if any. But, by 27 July, it was definitely understood that Garden City was to have a basic flying training school. By the middle of July, the Division Engineers had received a set of plans for the construction of the new type of base. The engineers were forced to remove every stake that had been driven for the former project and start anew. Contracts were let for construction before all the new stakes had been set out.

=== Construction ===
The main base of the Garden City Army Airfield consisted of 1,584.66 acres, approximately 489 acres of which was re- served for the building area. The base was located on an irregular plot of high ground adjacent to the Arkansas River. The field extended one and one-half miles north and south and one and eight-tenths miles east and west along U.S. Route 50 South in Finney county, about 11 miles southeast of Garden City and 42 miles west northwest of Dodge City. The land was acquired by judgments of Declaration of Taking in the United States District Court for the District of Kansas, Second Division.

Some 66 barracks, with a total capacity of 2,224 persons, were built for enlisted personnel, while 520 cadets could be accommodated in 26 barracks. Officers' quarters consisted of 17 buildings, with a total capacity of 272. Two buildings were provided for nurses' living quarters and mess hall. Total housing capacity for all personnel was 3,219. The base hospital was constructed with five wards, with 151 beds.

Five runways were built, four with a dimension of 150 x 6500 feet, and one 150 x 4,960 feet, with a gross load capacity of 74,000 pounds, wheel load of 37,000 pounds. Runways and apron (500 x 4,750 feet) were constructed with a ten-inch gravel base placed in layers on a six-inch compacted earth subbase, and surfaced with one and one-half-inch asphalt cement; the service strip (80 feet wide) was a six-inch concrete slab, thickened to nine inches at the expansion and construction joints. Five taxiways, 50 feet wide, completed the runway system. Fronting on the field, three squadron hangars, 120 by 80 feet, were built.

Four auxiliary fields were planned, but only three were constructed. They were located as follows:

- Ingalls Army Auxiliary Airfield #1 37°54′29″N 100°31′41″W
- Pierceville Army Auxiliary Airfield #2 37°59′52″N 100°37′52″W
- Garden City Army Auxiliary Airfield #3 38°00′28″N 100°46′10″W
- Garden City Municipal Airport 37°57′53″N 100°49′08″W

Runways on Auxiliary Field No. 1 were of concrete, while those of Nos. 2 and 3 were of the bituminous mat type. The runway area was the same on all three auxiliary fields 4,950 square feet. None of the auxiliary fields were completed when training began, and, as a result, the Garden City Municipal Airport served as an auxiliary field in the interim.

Construction was officially completed on 25 May 1943 when the Project Completion Report was signed by the Area Engineer. Up to 23 March 1943, funds apportioned for construction reached a total of $9,224,432.16.

=== Basic Flying School ===
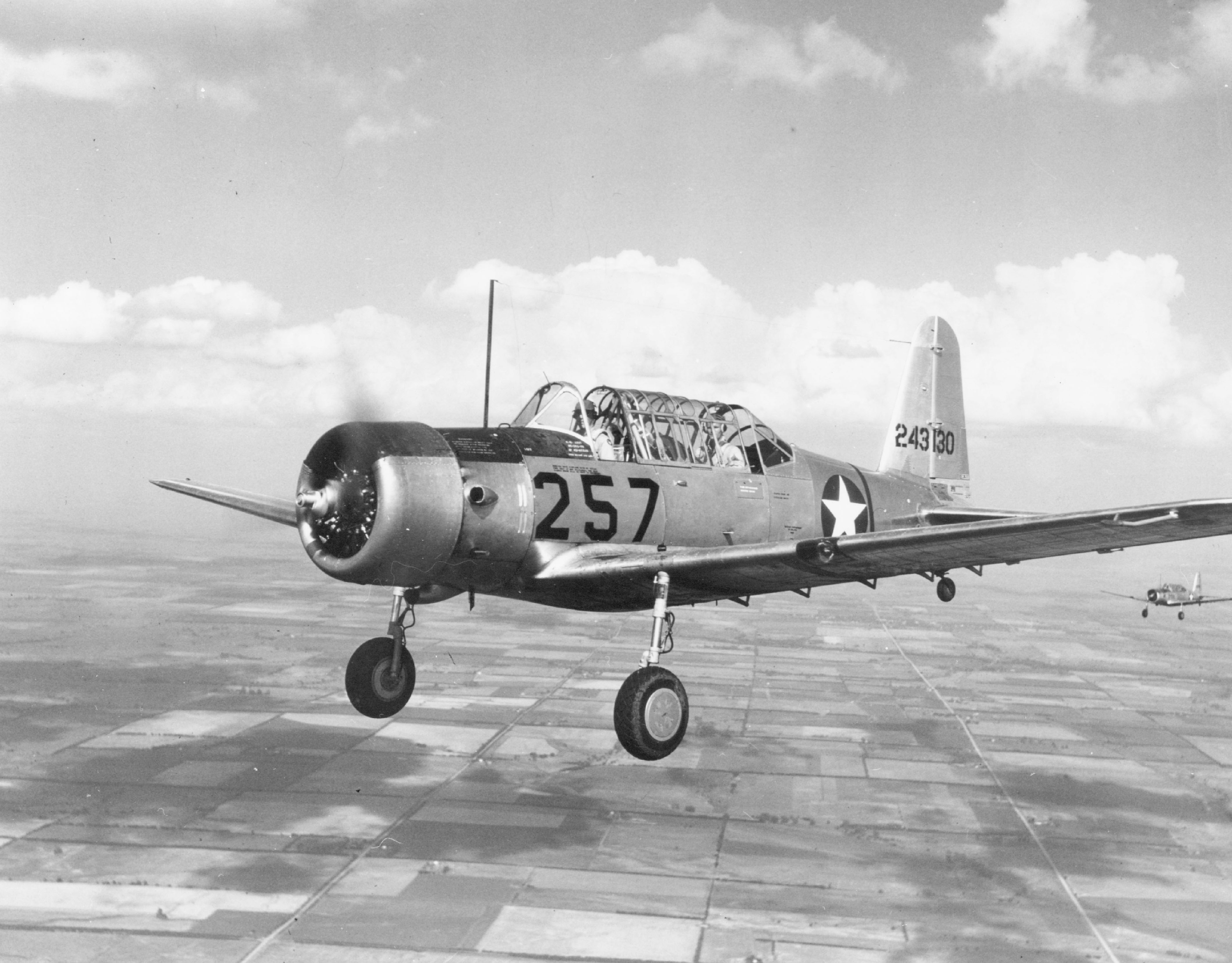
Vultee BT-13 Valiant

Long before the actual completion of construction the base was in operation. The field was officially activated on 21 December 1942. Official designation of the school at the time of activation was Army Air Forces Basic Flying School, Garden City Army Airfield. The school was controlled by the 32d Flying Training Wing (Basic), Perrin Army Airfield, Texas, Central Flying Training Command (CFTC). The 1050th and 1051st Basic Flying Squadrons were moved from Perrin AAF on 21 December 1942 as the flying training units, flying the Vultee BT-13A Valiant single-engine trainer. They were joined by the 502d Basic Flying Training Squadron, being moved from Lubbock Army Airfield, Texas on 4 February 1943 when Lubbock became a Twin-Engine school.

The assigned mission of Garden City AAF was pilot training for basic students. As originally planned, the first class was to arrive on 15 March 1943, but this schedule was moved up to 15 January 1943. The class began training on 16 January. From then on the base was the scene of feverish and effective training activity. In September 1943, twin-engine training was introduced flying Cessna UC-78 Bobcat advanced trainers (AT-17).

For a time during 1944, a few Women's Air Force Service Pilots (WASPs) were stationed at the field, serving as engineering test flight pilots. On 30 April 1944, this school organization was replaced, without transfer of personnel, by the 2521st AAF Base Unit (Pilot School, Basic). The three flying training squadrons were reorganized as squadrons "A", "B" and "C".

The need for basic flying training schools having considerably lessened by the latter part of 1944, the basic flying school at Garden City Army Air Field was discontinued by Headquarters, Central Flying Training Command, effective 23 November 1944. Since training was somewhat ahead of schedule, 18 November became the final training date.

Immediately thereafter, both instructors and students were transferred. The upper class of cadets was transferred to advanced training, while students of the lower class were dispersed among other schools in order to complete the basic course. Garden City AAF was transferred to the jurisdiction of the Oklahoma City Air Technical Service Command on 15 December 1944 and placed on a standby status.

=== Aircraft storage facility ===
On 27 February 1945, authority was granted to place the base on an active status as a storage depot for strategic aircraft of Class I, from which aircraft were kept in a short-term ready state and could be flown out within 72 hours.

The 4132d AAF Base Unit (Air Base) was organized on 16 December 1944 to man what was now an aircraft storage depot. The peak of the storage mission was reached by July 1945, when 1,456 aircraft were stored on the base. After July 1945, the primary mission was reversed, that is, the major activity became the preparation of aircraft to be flown away from the base. By autumn of 1946 this phase of the mission was completed.

=== Inactivation ===
On 29 October 1946, in anticipation of deactivation of Garden City Army Airfield, the base was placed in an inactive status by the Army Air Forces, and on 15 March 1947, the 4132d AAF Base Unit was discontinued. On 18 May 1947, ATSC transferred Garden City AAF to the Army's District Engineer, Seventh Service Command at Omaha, Nebraska, who assumed jurisdiction over the field, pending disposition. The War Assets Administration eventually turned the air base over to the City of Garden City.

== Current status ==
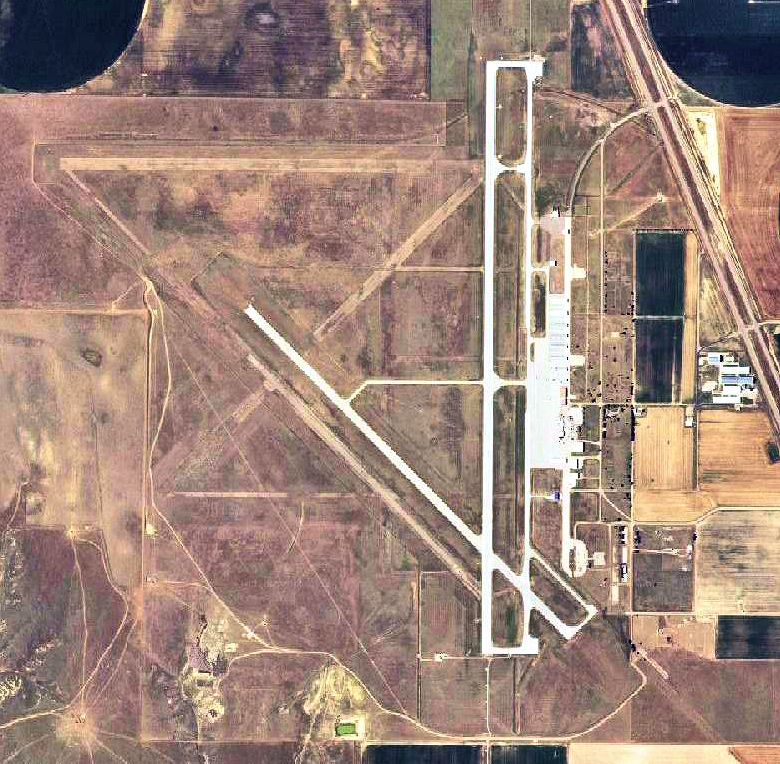
2006 USGS airphoto of the former Garden City Army Airfield

Excess buildings and demilitarized equipment were sold or transferred to other bases. Some were torn down and sales were held for scrap lumber of torn down buildings, fence posts, barbed wire and other items which no longer had a useful need.

The renamed new Garden City Municipal Airport served as a mid-continent stop for one of the country's first coast-to-coast air mail services. Two runways of the World War II Army airfield remain in use, the east-west runway being closed and the concrete being removed from the runway as well as many of the taxiways. The large parking apron has also been reduced in size. One of the wartime hangars remains in use, the other two being torn down, although the concrete foundations remain. Concrete foundations of some station buildings and a maintenance area are evident on the south side of the station area; outlines of other structures removed from the site are visible in aerial photography in otherwise grassy areas. Many streets remain along with the outline of the base parade ground and headquarters.

The former wartime airfield can be reached travelling east on U.S. Route 50/400 from Garden City.

== See also ==
- Kansas World War II Army Airfields
- 32d Flying Training Wing (World War II)
