= 201st Fighter Squadron =

- Escuadrón 201
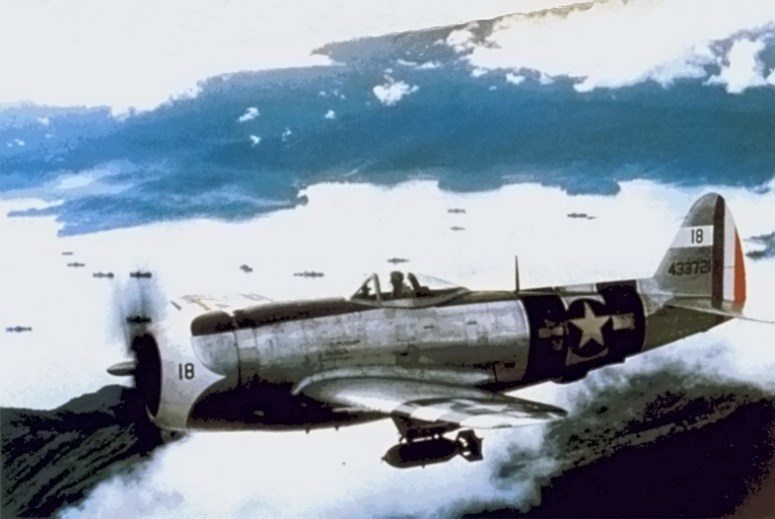
- P-47D Thunderbolt using both USAAF and FAM insignia (right wing and tail)
- Active: July 24, 1944 – present
- Country: Mexico
- Branch: Mexican Air Force
- Type: Fighter-bomber squadron
- Role: Air combat
- Size: 25 P-47D aircraft, 30 pilots, 300 personnel
- Part of: U.S. Fifth Air Force; 58th Fighter Group
- Garrison/HQ: Cozumel, Quintana Roo
- Nickname: Aztec Eagles
- Colors: Purple, yellow
- Mascot: Pancho Pistolas
- Engagements: World War II; Philippines campaign; Battle of Luzon; Chiapas conflict

The 201st Fighter Squadron "Aztec Eagles" (Spanish: Escuadrón Aéreo de Pelea 201) is a fighter squadron of the Mexican Air Force, and was a part of the Mexican Expeditionary Air Force (FAEM) that aided the Allied war effort during World War II. The squadron was known by the nickname Águilas Aztecas or "Aztec Eagles", apparently coined by members of the squadron during training.

The squadron was attached to the 58th Fighter Group of the United States Army Air Forces (USAAF) during the liberation of the main Philippine island of Luzon in the summer of 1945. The pilots flew Republic P-47D-30-RA Thunderbolt single-seat fighter aircraft carrying out tactical air support missions.

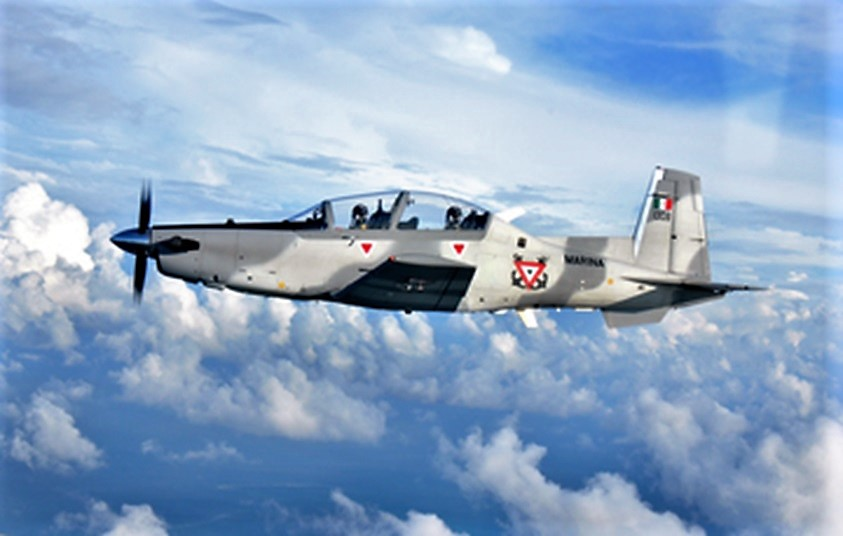
Escuadrón 201 flies T-6C Texan II aircraft similar to this one.

A neighborhood of Mexico City and its corresponding Mexico City Metro Line 8 station Metro Escuadrón 201 are both named after the squadron. Escuela Escuadron 201 in Tepoztlan is also named for the unit. It was also the subject of the Mexican film Escuadrón 201, directed by Jaime Salvador and released in 1945. On November 22, 2004, the squadron was awarded the Philippine Legion of Honor, with a rank of Legionnaire, by then president Gloria Macapagal Arroyo. The unit, now called Escuadrón 201 is still active in Cozumel, Mexico, it flew the Pilatus PC-7 from the 1990s through the early 2000s, but in 2012 upgraded to the T-6C Texan II trainer.

== Formation and training ==
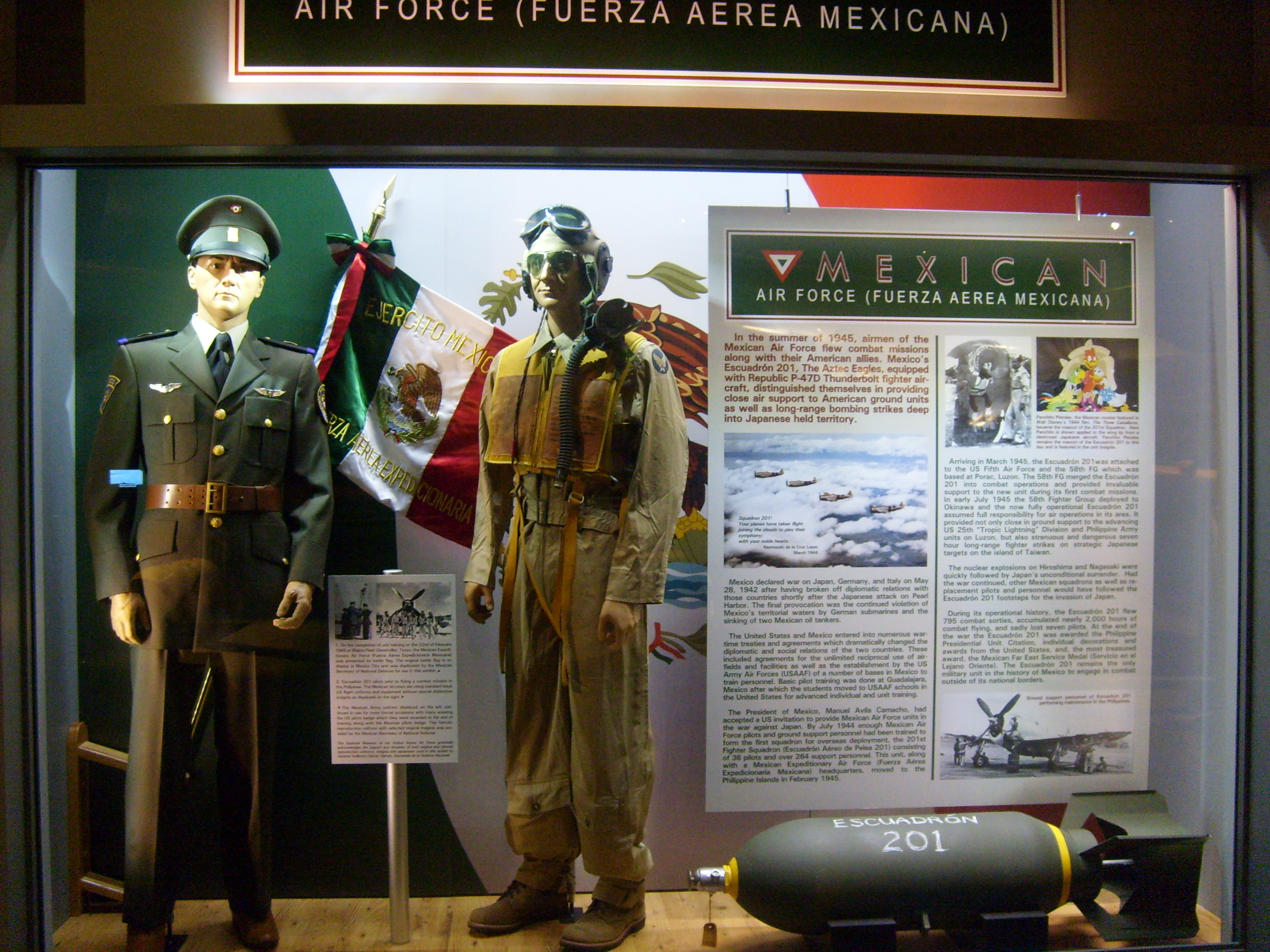
Escuadrón 201 display at the National Museum of the United States Air Force

The Escuadrón Aéreo de Pelea 201 (201st Air Fighter Squadron) was composed of more than 300 volunteers; 36 pilots and 264 ground crew. The ground crewmen were electricians, mechanics, and radiomen. Its formation was prompted by the attack by German submarines against Mexican oil tankers Potrero del Llano and Faja de Oro, that were transporting crude oil to the United States. These attacks prompted President Manuel Ávila Camacho to declare war on the Axis powers on May 22, 1942, and to join Brazil as the only two Latin American countries to actually send military forces overseas.

The squadron left Mexico for training in the United States on July 24, 1944, arrived at Laredo, Texas, on July 25, and moved on to Randolph Field in San Antonio, where the personnel received medical examinations and admission tests in weapons and flight proficiency. The FAEM pilots received three months of training at Randolph, Foster Army Air Field in Victoria, Texas; while the ground crew was trained at Pocatello Army Air Base in Idaho. In October, the pilots joined the ground crew in Idaho and received extensive training in armament, communications and tactics. The pilots also were given important instruction in English by Women's Army Corps (WACs) so that the airmen could communicate with control towers and other pilots in the United States.

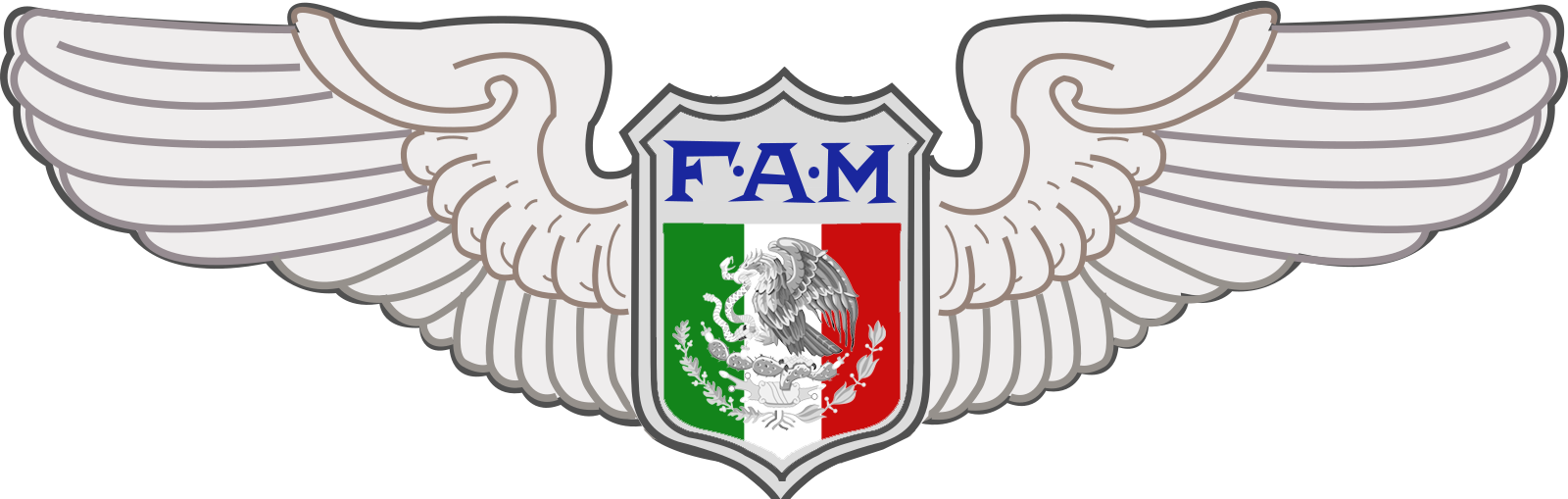

The squadron moved to Majors Field in Greenville, Texas, on November 30, 1944 due to the extreme cold weather in Idaho. Here, the pilots received advanced training in combat air tactics, ground attack, instrument flying, navigation and high altitude flight. The airmen graduated on February 20, 1945, and the squadron was presented with its battle flag. This marked the first time Mexican troops were trained for overseas combat. In charge of the group was Colonel Antonio Cárdenas Rodríguez, and Captain First Class Radamés Gaxiola Andrade was named squadron commander.

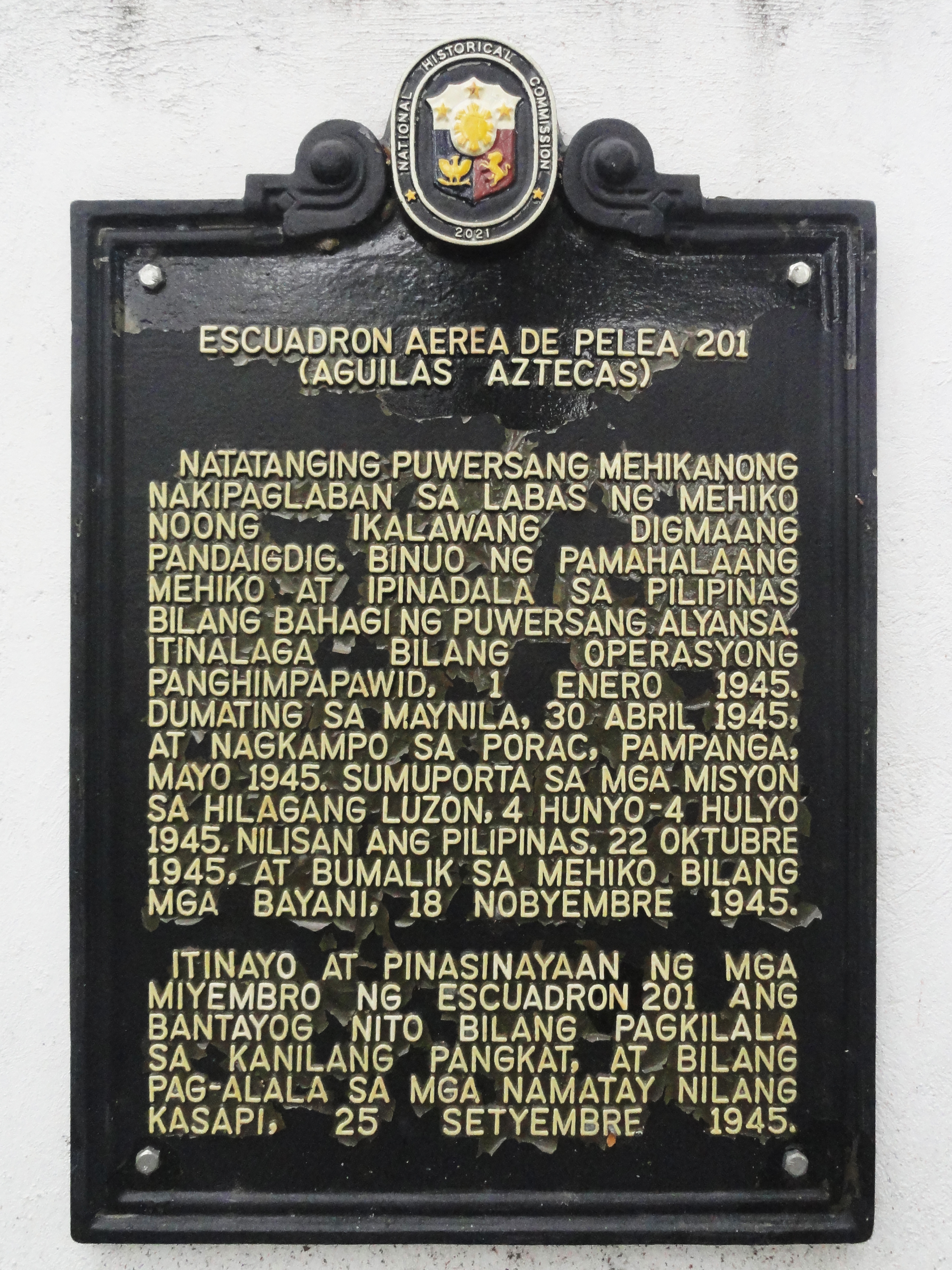
Historical marker installed in Manila, Philippines, to commemorate the squadron's assistance to the country during World War II

Before leaving for the Philippines, the men received further instructions and physical examinations in Camp Stoneman in Pittsburg, California, in March 1945. The men left for the Philippines on the troop ship S.S. Fairisle on March 27, 1945. The squadron arrived in Manila on April 30, 1945, and was assigned as part of the Fifth Air Force, attached to the U.S. 58th Fighter Group, based at Porac, Pampanga, in the Clark Field complex on the island of Luzon.

== Combat operations ==
Escuadrón 201
Combat missions	96
Offensive sorties	785
Defensive sorties	6
Flying hours in combat	1,966:15
Flying hours in combat zone	591:00
Pre-combat flying hours	281:00
Flying hours per pilot	82
Total flying hours	2,842:00
Bombs dropped	1,000 lb.: 957; 500 lb.: 500
Ammunition used (cal. 0.50")	166,922 rounds
Aircraft lost in combat	1
Aircraft damaged in combat	5
Pilots lost in combat	3
Pilots lost in accidents	Crash-landing 1 Fuel exhaustion 2

Beginning in June 1945, the squadron initially flew missions with the 310th Fighter Squadron, often twice a day, using borrowed U.S. aircraft. It received 25 new P-47D-30-RA aircraft in July, marked with the insignia of both the USAAF and Mexican Air Force, which the Aztec airmen called Peh-Cuas. The squadron flew more than 90 combat missions, totaling more than 1,900 hours of flight time. It participated in the Allied effort to bomb Luzon and Formosa to push the Japanese out of those islands. During its fighting in the Philippines, five squadron pilots died (one was shot down, one crashed, and three ran out of fuel and died at sea) and three others died in accidents during training.

Among the missions flown by the squadron were 53 ground support missions flown in support of the U.S. 25th Infantry Division together with the Philippine Commonwealth troops and recognized guerrilla units in the break-out into the Cagayan Valley on Luzon between 4 June and 4 July 1945; 37 training missions flown 14–21 July 1945 (including missions to ferry new aircraft from Biak Island, New Guinea); four fighter sweeps over Formosa on 6–9 July 1945; and a dive bombing mission against the port of Karenko, Formosa, on 8 August.

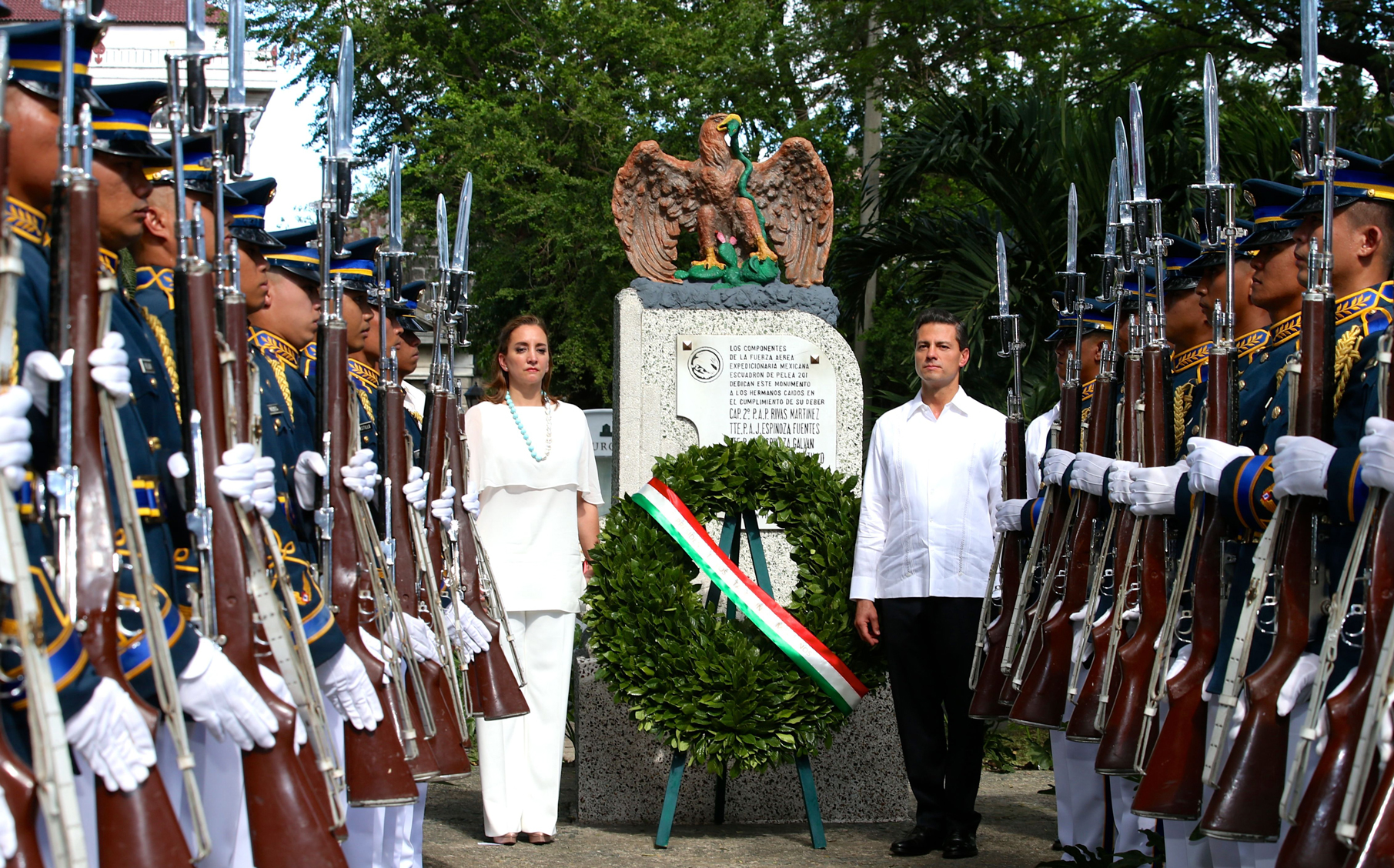
President Enrique Peña Nieto and Secretary of Foreign Affairs Claudia Ruiz Massieu visit the monument to the 201st Fighter Squadron in Manila, November 2015.

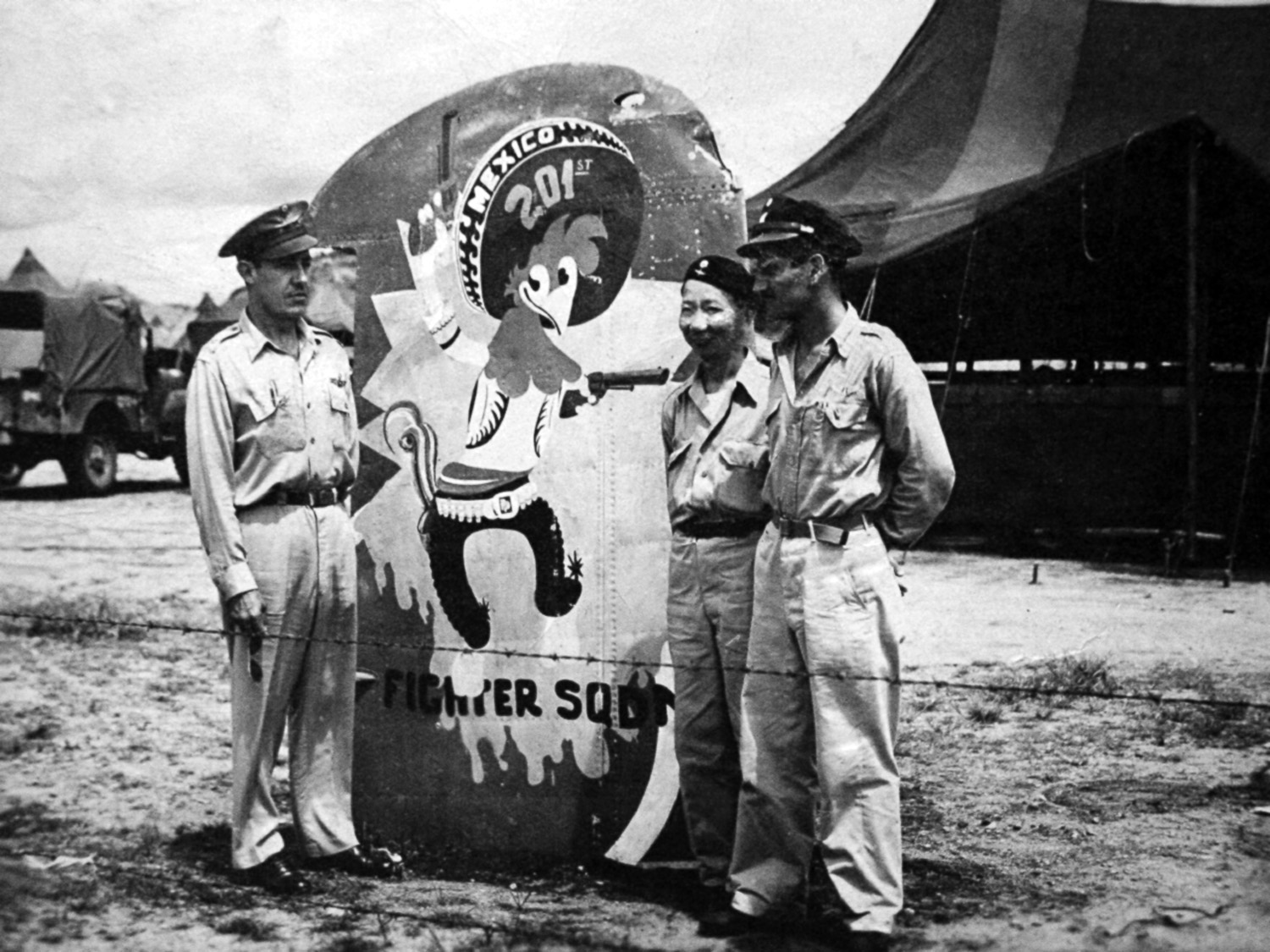
US Army Air Force, Philippine army and Mexican air force members stand near a representation of Panchito Pistoles, the mascot of the Escuadrón 201, painted on a wing fragment of a Japanese aircraft. Panchito Pistoles starred in the Disney film The Three Caballeros and was adopted by the unit.

When the 201st deployed, no provision for replacement pilots had been made and the pilot losses incurred in the Philippines hampered its effectiveness. Mexican replacement pilots were rushed through familiarization training in the United States, and two more pilots died in flight accidents in Florida. When the 58th Fighter Group left the Philippines for Okinawa on July 10, the Mexicans stayed behind. They flew their last combat mission as a full squadron on August 26, escorting a convoy north of the Philippines. Not only did the pilots get into combat, but also the ground personnel encountered Japanese troops, having some fire-fights and capturing a number of enemy troops as well. The 201st Mexican Squadron was given credit for putting out of action about 30,000 Japanese troops and the destruction of enemy held-buildings, vehicles, tanks, anti-aircraft guns, machine guns emplacements and ammunition depots.

The work of the 201st was recognized by General Douglas MacArthur, Supreme Commander of Allied Forces in the Southwest Pacific Area.

The 201st returned to Mexico City on 18 November 1945. In a military parade in the Zócalo the Fighter Squadron delivered the Mexican flag to President Manuel Ávila Camacho. The FAEM was disbanded after returning from the Philippines. The unit was awarded the Mexican Far East Service Medal (Servicio en el Lejano Oriente) and is the only unit of the Mexican military to fight in combat outside the country's borders.

The squadron's battle flag is among other historical items in the Museo Nacional de Historia in Mexico City.

The Escuadrón Aéreo de Pelea 201 is still an active duty squadron, formerly flying the Pilatus PC-7 and currently the T-6C Texan II from Cozumel, Quintana Roo, and saw extensive counter-insurgency service during the 1994 uprising in Chiapas.

== Squadron pilots ==
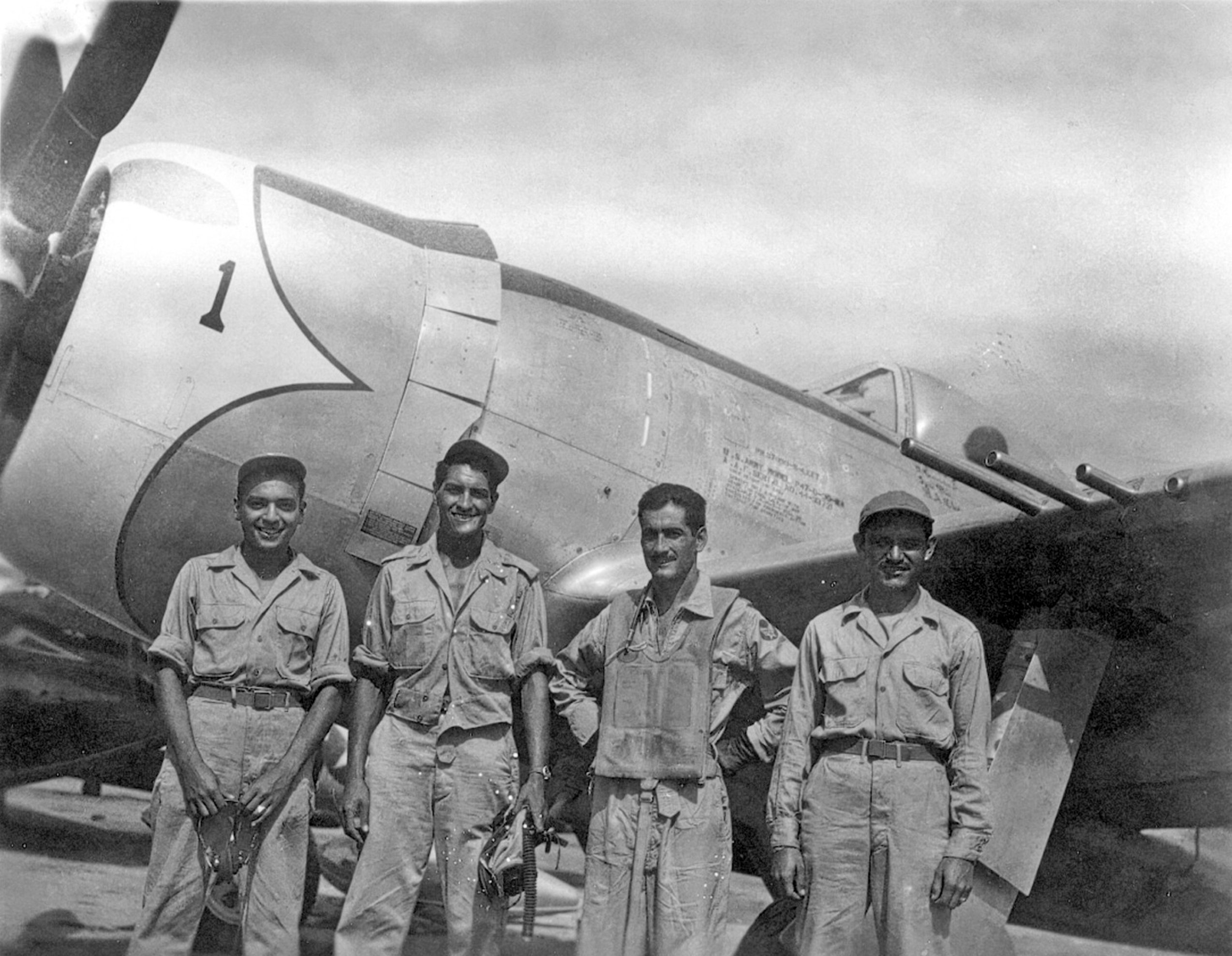
Capt. Radamés Gaxiola stands in front of his P-47D with his maintenance team after he returned from a combat mission

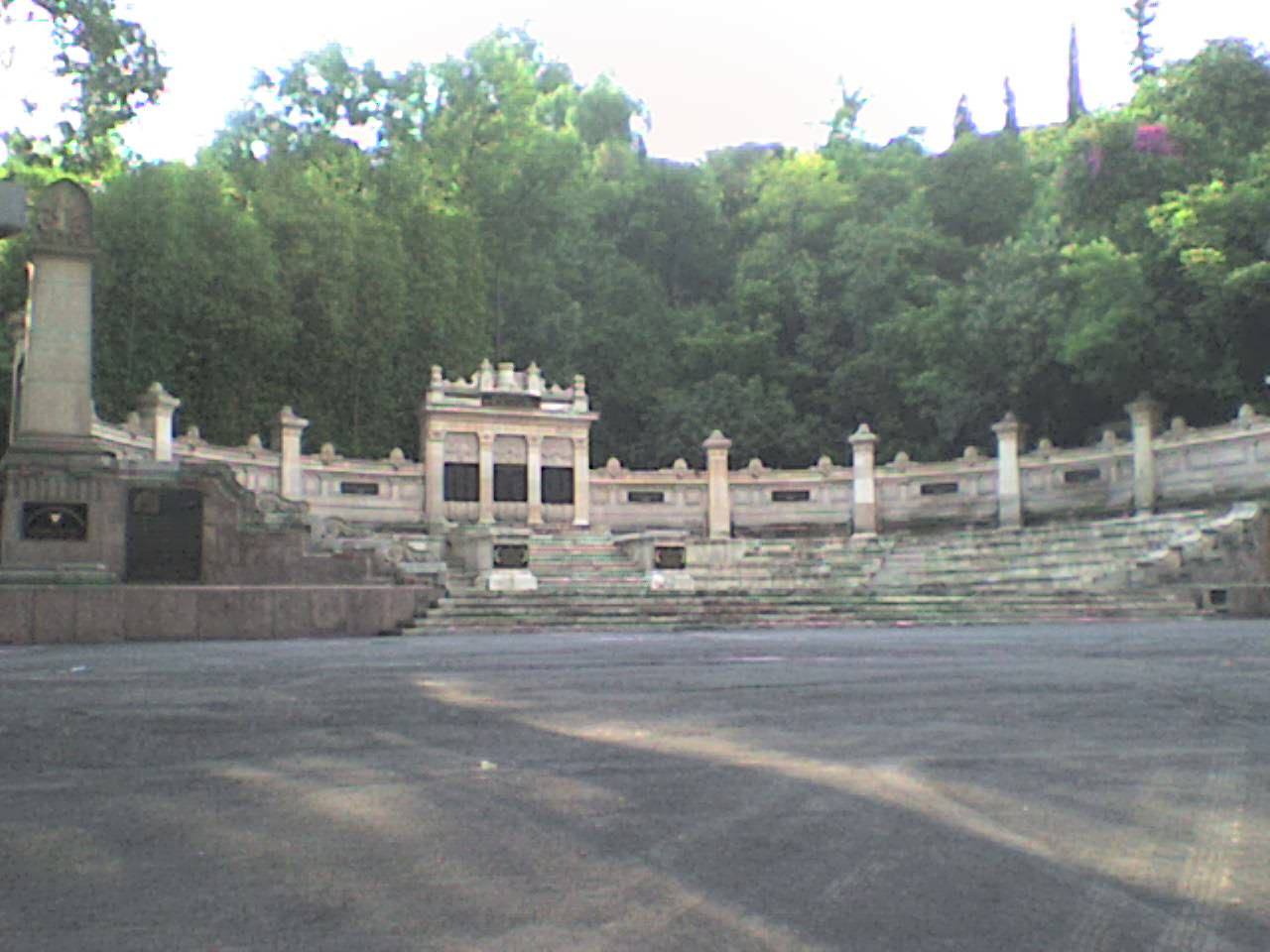
Monument in Chapultepec, in honor of the 201st Squadron.

Name list on the Chapultepec memorial plaque:

Carlos Garduño Núñez	Radamés Gaxiola Andrade	Julio Cal y Mayor Sauz
Graco Ramírez Garrido	Amador Sámano Piña	David Cerón Bedolla	Jesús Tapia Estrada
Fernando Hernández Vega	José Luis Pratt Ramos	Audberto Gutierrez Ramires
Carlos Varela Landini	Joaquín Ramírez Vilchis	Justino Reyes Retana
Ángel Sánchez Rebollo	Carlos Rodríguez Corona	Manuel Farías Rodríguez
Miguel Moreno Arreola	Roberto Legorreta Sicilia	Reynaldo Pérez Gallardo
Praxedis López Ramos	Jacobo Estrada Luna	José Barbosa Cerda
Raúl García Mercado	Pedro Martinez Pérez	Roberto Urías Aveleyra	Guillermo García Ramos
Miguel Uriarte Aguilar	Jaime Zenizo Rojas	Crisóforo Salido Grijalva**
Héctor Espinoza Galván*	José Espinoza Fuentes*	Fausto Vega Santander*
Mario López Portillo*	Mamerto Albarrán Nágera*	Javier Martínez Valle***	José Gutiérrez Gallegos	Florentino Mejía Gómez	Carlos José Cárdenas

Pilots marked with an asterisk (*) were killed during flying operations in the Philippines. Pilot marked by two asterisks (**) died in January 1945 during training exercises at the Army Air Base at Abilene, Texas. Pilot marked by three asterisks (***) was killed in a low altitude gunnery training exercise in March 1945 near Harlingen AAF in Texas.

== Current location of aircraft ==
One of the P-47 Thunderbolt is on display at the Mexican Air Force Museum. (Spanish: Museo Militar de Aviación "Teniente Piloto Aviador José Espinoza Fuentes")

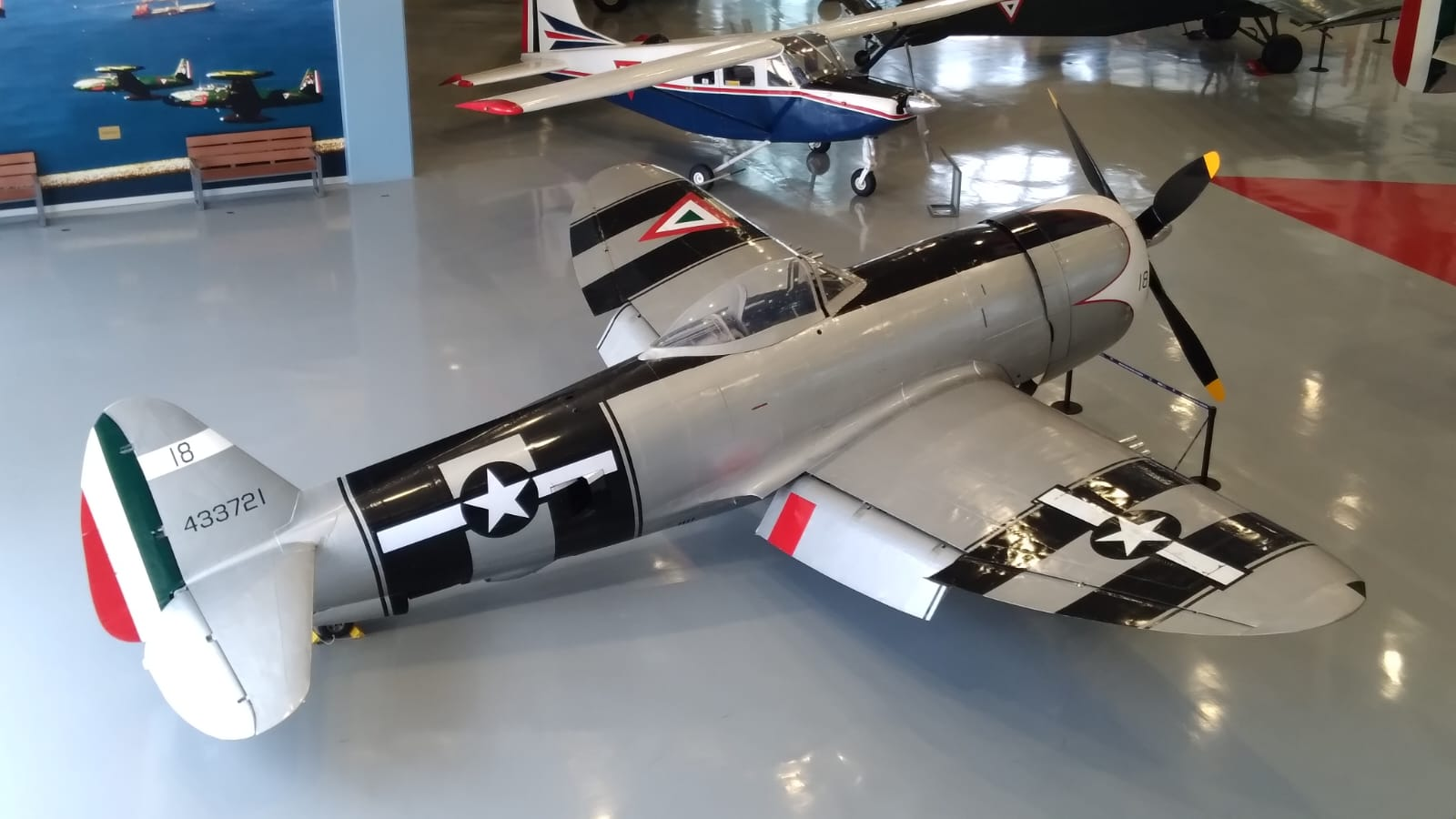
P-47 Thunderbolt from the 201st Squadron, on display at the Mexican Air Force Museum
