= Antonio Cárdenas Rodríguez =

Mexican military aviator (1903–1969)

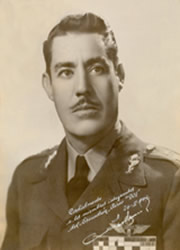
- Born: September 20, 1903; General Cepeda, Coahuila, Mexico
- Died: July 4, 1969 (aged 65); Mexico
- Military career
- Allegiance: Mexico
- Branch: Mexican Air Force
- Service years: 1925–1963
- Rank: Colonel
- Nickname: El Charro
- Unit: Escuadrón 201
- Commands: Fuerza Aérea Expedicionaria Mexicana
- Conflicts: World War II; South Pacific Theatre; Battle of Luzon
- Awards: Legion of Merit

General de División Antonio Cárdenas Rodríguez (6 October 1903 – 4 July 1969) was a military aviator and head of the Mexican Air Force. As a Colonel he made a goodwill flight of several countries in Latin America. He traveled almost 35,000 km in 118 hours of flight time aboard a Lockheed 12, named "President Carranza" returning to Mexico City on September 13, 1940. He commanded the Fuerza Aérea Expedicionaria Mexicana (FAEM), who participated in World War II at the Battle of Luzon in the Philippines. The FAEM is notable as the only Mexican military unit ever to fight outside Mexico itself. Ixtepec No. 2 Air Base in Ixtepec, Oaxaca is named in honour of General Cárdenas Rodríguez.

Rodríguez Cárdenas retired from the Mexican Air Force with the rank of Divisional General.
