= Majors Airport =

Airport in Hunt County, Texas

Majors Airport Majors Army Airfield
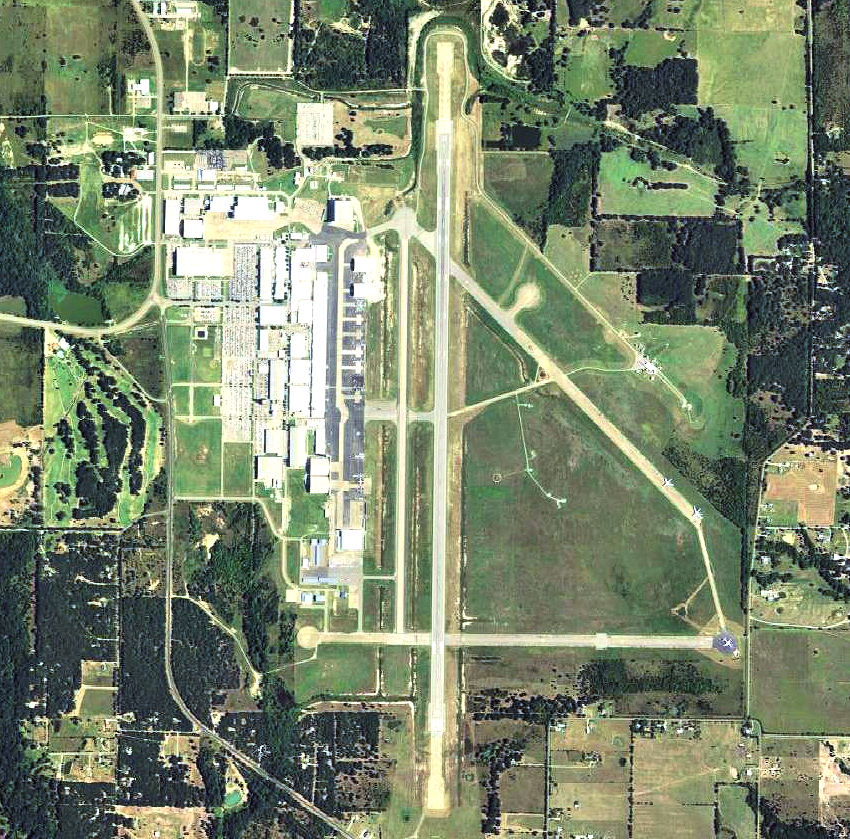
- 2008 USGS airphoto
- IATA: GVT; ICAO: KGVT; FAA LID: GVT

Summary
- Airport type: Public
- Owner: City of Greenville
- Serves: Greenville, Texas
- Elevation AMSL: 535 ft / 163 m
- Coordinates: 33°04′04″N 96°03′55″W

Map
- Location

Runways
Direction	Length		Surface
Direction	ft	m	Surface
17/35	8,030	2,448	Asphalt

Statistics (2007)
- Aircraft operations: 35,640
- Based aircraft: 39
- Source: Federal Aviation Administration

Majors Airport (IATA: GVT, ICAO: KGVT, FAA LID: GVT) is a city-owned airport 4 nautical miles (7.4 km) southeast of the central business district of Greenville, in Hunt County, Texas.

Originally named Majors Field, it is home to L3Harris Mission Integration Division (MID), which performs aircraft modification.

== History ==
Majors Airport, named for Lieutenant Truett Majors, the first Hunt County native to perish in World War II, began operations on June 26, 1942, as a training center for the United States Army Air Forces (USAAF). Lt Majors was killed in the 1942 Battle of the Philippines in January 1942. Greenville was chosen as a site for the USAAF basic flight-training center due to the efforts of the influential politician Sam Rayburn. The base was dedicated and named on 5 January 1943.

Majors Army Airfield (AAF) was assigned initially to the Gulf Coast Training Center (later Central Flying Command). The airport was at one point the home to approximately 5,000 pilots, support personnel, and civilian employees. Majors also was a major training base for Women Airforce Service Pilots (WASP)s. Flying training was performed with Fairchild PT-19s as the primary trainer. Also several PT-17 Stearmans and a few P-40 Warhawks were assigned to the field.

Majors Army Air Field 1944 Classbook

In addition to training USAAF pilots, the airfield was the training site for Escuadrón 201 of the Mexican Air Force. The training center was reassigned to Second Air Force on 30 November 1944 as a group training center, primary for the assignment of replacement personnel to combat squadrons in overseas theaters.

Majors AAF was inactivated on 18 July 1945 after the defeat of Germany; the city of Greenville then took ownership, then leased the site to TEMCO (which, after a series of acquisitions, became L3Harris' Mission Integration Division, the city's largest employer by a wide margin).

The airport had airline flights (Central DC-3s) for a year or two around 1952.

== Facilities ==
Majors Airport covers 1,525 acres (617 ha) at an elevation of 535 feet (163 m). Its one runway, 17/35, is 8,030 by 150 feet (2,448 x 46 m) asphalt.

In the year ending 23 June 2016, the airport had 19,135 aircraft operations, averaging 52 per day: 99% general aviation and 1% military. 42 aircraft were then based at the airport: 86% single-engine, 5% multi-engine, 7% jets, and 2% helicopters.

== Accidents and incidents ==
- 14 July 1994: A Cessna 310Q, registration number N310AE, crashed after an uncontrolled left-hand descent during a practice single-engine go-around, destroying the aircraft and killing the student pilot and certified flight instructor (CFI) aboard. The landing gear was found to have been extended on impact, contrary to the manufacturer's recommended procedure to retract the gear during a go-around. The accident was attributed to "the CFI's failure to maintain minimum airspeed above V_{MC}, resulting in a loss of control during the single engine go-around. Factors were not attaining runway alignment and the CFI's failure to retract the landing gear for the go-around procedure."
- On 5 March 2014, a regional American Eagle jet heading from Dallas/Fort Worth International Airport made an emergency landing after the pilot reported smoke in the cockpit. Flight 3400 was bound for Moline, Il., when it was diverted about 9 p.m. to Majors Airport in Greenville. Jim Hogan, a passenger from Iowa City, Iowa, seated in the exit row, opened the door and led the way for the other passengers to disembark.

== See also ==
- Texas World War II Army Airfields
- 32d Flying Training Wing (World War II)
- List of airports in Texas

== Other sources ==
- This article incorporates public domain material from the Air Force Historical Research Agency
- Manning, Thomas A. (2005), History of Air Education and Training Command, 1942–2002. Office of History and Research, Headquarters, AETC, Randolph AFB, Texas OCLC 71006954, 29991467
- Shaw, Frederick J. (2004), Locating Air Force Base Sites, History’s Legacy, Air Force History and Museums Program, United States Air Force, Washington DC. OCLC 57007862, 1050653629
- Thole, Lou (1999), Forgotten Fields of America : World War II Bases and Training, Then and Now – Vol. 2. Publisher: Pictorial Histories Pub, ISBN 1-57510-051-7
